= Luke Meade =

Irish hurler

Personal information
- Native name: Lúcás Miach (Irish)
- Born: 29 October 1996 (age 30) Newcestown, County Cork, Ireland
- Occupation: Primary school teacher
- Height: 1.83 m (6 ft 0 in)

Sport
- Sport: Hurling
- Position: Midfield
Club*
Years	Club	Apps (scores)
2013–present	Newcestown	11 (1–33)
Club titles
- Cork titles: 0
College
- Years: College
- 2015–2019: Mary Immaculate College
College titles
- Fitzgibbon titles: 1
Inter-county**
Years	County	Apps (scores)
2015–2025	Cork	37 (1–19)
Inter-county titles
- Munster titles: 3
- All-Irelands: 0
- NHL: 1
- All Stars: 0
- * club appearances and scores correct as of 11:02, 5 August 2019. **Inter County team apps and scores correct as of 21:52, 7 July 2024.

Luke Meade (born 29 October 1996) is an Irish hurler. At club level he plays with Newcestown and at inter-county level with the Cork senior hurling team. He usually lines out as a midfielder.

== Early life ==
Born and raised in Newcestown, County Cork, Meade played hurling with the school team at Hamilton High School in Bandon. He progressed through the various age grades and was part of the school's senior team that beat Midleton CBS to win the Dr O'Callaghan Cup title in 2014. He also played numerous games for the school in the Harty Cup.

Meade later studied at Mary Immaculate College in Limerick and was added to their Fitzgibbon Cup panel in 2016. His debut season ended with a winners' medal after a 3–24 to 1–19 defeat of the Institute of Technology, Carlow in the final. Meade was also part of the Mary I team beaten by University College Cork in the 2019 final.

== Club career ==
Meade began his club career at juvenile and underage levels with the Newcestown club. He was part of the club's under-21 team that claimed three successive West Cork U21AHC titles between 2013 and 2015.

By that stage Meade had already joined Newcestown's top adult team. He had his first success in October 2015 when Newcestown beat Valley Rovers by 1–23 to 0–08 to claim the Cork PIHC title. He was also part of the Newcestown team beaten by Wolfe Tones na Sionna in the subsequent Munster final.

In October 2023, Meade won a Cork SAHC title after a 3–17 to 0–24 defeat of Blarney in the final replay.

== Inter-county career ==
Meade first played for Cork as a member of the minor team and scored 2–04 in his debut against Kerry in April 2014. He later spent three seasons with the under-21 team but ended his underage career with a two-point defeat by Limerick in the 2017 Munster U21 final after an injury-ravaged season.

Meade had just turned 18 and was still in secondary school when he was approached to join the Cork senior hurling team in January 2015. He was selected at left corner-forward in a challenge game against Limerick and scored a hat-trick of goals in a 6–13 to 2–18 victory. Later that year he was added to Cork's intermediate team and won a Munster IHC medal following a 0–20 to 0–18 defeat of Limerick in the final. Cork lost the 2015 All-Ireland IHC final to Galway, with Meade being introduced as a second-half substitute in the 0–23 to 0–14 defeat.

After making several appearances during the 2016 Munster League, Meade was a member of the extended training panel for the subsequent National League and All-Ireland SHC campaigns. He became a regular member of the starting fifteen during Cork's 2017 National League campaign and made his Munster SHC debut in May 2017 in a 2–27 to 1–26 quarter-final defeat of Tipperary. Meade subsequently claimed a provincial winners' medal following Cork's 1–25 to 1–20 defeat of Clare in the 2017 Munster final.

Meade collected a second consecutive provincial winners' medal in July 2018 after scoring 1–01 from play in a 2–24 to 3–19 defeat of Clare in the 2018 Munster final. In August 2021, he lined out at midfield when Cork suffered a 3–32 to 1–22 defeat by Limerick in the 2021 All-Ireland final.

== Career statistics ==
=== Club ===
As of 7 September 2025.

Team	Year	Cork PIHC		Munster		All-Ireland		Total	
Team	Year	Apps	Score	Apps	Score	Apps	Score	Apps	Score
Newcestown	2013	2	0-01	—		—		2	0-01
Newcestown	2014	5	0-08	—		—		5	0-08
Newcestown	2015	5	2–14	2	0-01	—		7	2–15
Newcestown	Total	12	2–23	2	0-01	—		14	2–24
Newcestown	Year	Cork SHC		Munster		All-Ireland		Total	
Newcestown	Year	Apps	Score	Apps	Score	Apps	Score	Apps	Score
Newcestown	2016	2	0-05	—		—		2	0-05
Newcestown	2017	4	1–13	—		—		4	1–13
Newcestown	2018	3	0-08	—		—		3	0-08
Newcestown	2019	2	0-07	—		—		2	0-07
Newcestown	Total	11	1–33	—		—		11	1–33
Newcestown	Year	Cork SAHC		Munster		All-Ireland		Total	
Newcestown	Year	Apps	Score	Apps	Score	Apps	Score	Apps	Score
Newcestown	2020	5	0-05	—		—		5	0-05
Newcestown	2021	5	1-08	—		—		5	1-08
Newcestown	2022	3	0-07	—		—		3	0-07
Newcestown	2023	7	0-01	—		—		7	0-01
Newcestown	Total	20	1–21	—		—		20	1–21
Newcestown	Year	Cork PSHC		Munster		All-Ireland		Total	
Newcestown	Year	Apps	Score	Apps	Score	Apps	Score	Apps	Score
Newcestown	2024	3	0-04	—		—		3	0-04
Newcestown	2025	3	0-04	—		—		3	0-04
Newcestown	Total	6	0–08	—		—		6	0–08
Career total		49	4–85	2	0-01	—		51	4–86

=== Inter-county ===
As of 7 July 2024.

Team	Year	National League			Munster		All-Ireland		Total	
Team	Year	Division	Apps	Score	Apps	Score	Apps	Score	Apps	Score
Cork	2015	Division 1A	0	0-00	0	0-00	0	0-00	0	0-00
Cork	2016	Division 1A	0	0-00	0	0-00	0	0-00	0	0-00
Cork	2017	Division 1A	6	2-07	3	0-04	1	0-00	10	2–11
Cork	2018	Division 1A	6	0-04	5	1-02	1	0-01	12	1-07
Cork	2019	Division 1A	5	0-03	4	0-03	1	0-00	10	0-06
Cork	2020	Division 1A	4	0-02	1	0-00	2	0-01	7	0-03
Cork	2021	Division 1A	5	1-03	1	0-00	4	0-02	10	1-05
Cork	2022	Division 1A	4	1-02	3	0-01	2	0-01	9	1-04
Cork	2023	Division 1A	4	0-01	4	0-02	—		8	0-03
Cork	2024	Division 1A	5	0-03	3	0-01	2	0-01	10	0-05
Career total			39	4–25	24	1–13	13	0-06	76	5–44

== Honours ==
Hamilton High School

- Dr O'Callaghan Cup: 2014

Mary Immaculate College

- Fitzgibbon Cup: 2017

Newcestown

- Cork Senior A Hurling Championship: 2023
- Cork Premier Intermediate Hurling Championship: 2015
- West Cork Under-21 A Hurling Championship: 2013, 2014, 2015

Cork

- Munster Senior Hurling Championship: 2017, 2018, 2025
- National Hurling League: 2025
- Munster Senior Hurling League: 2017
- Munster Intermediate Hurling Championship: 2015
