= Shane Barrett =

Irish hurler (born 2001)

Personal information
- Native name: Seán de Bairéid (Irish)
- Nickname: The Blarney bullet
- Born: 31 January 2001 (age 25) Blarney, County Cork, Ireland
- Occupation: Accountant
- Height: 6 ft 1 in (185 cm)

Sport
- Sport: Hurling
- Position: Centre-forward
Clubs*
Years	Club	Apps (scores)
2019-present 2020	Blarney → UCC	29 (6-171); 3 (0-07)
Club titles
- Cork titles: 0
College
Years	College	Apps (scores)
2019-2024	UCC	11 (4-33)
College titles
- Fitzgibbon titles: 0
Inter-county**
Years	County	Apps (scores)
2020-present	Cork	34 (7-58)
Inter-county titles
- Munster titles: 1
- All-Irelands: 0
- NHL: 1
- All Stars: 1
- * club appearances and scores correct as of 21:01, 31 January 2026. **Inter County team apps and scores correct as of 20:42, 5 July 2026.

Shane Barrett (born 31 January 2001) is an Irish hurler. At club level he plays with Blarney and at inter-county level with the Cork senior hurling team. He usually lines out as a centre-forward.

== Early life ==
Born and raised in Rathpeacon, County Cork, Barrett first played hurling to a high standard as a student at Christian Brothers College, Cork. He progressed through the various age grades before joining the school's senior team in 2017. Barret's final year with the college ended with defeat by Midleton CBS in the 2019 Harty Cup final, before losing to St Kieran's College in the All-Ireland semi-final. He later studied at University College Cork and immediately joined their freshers' hurling team before later joining UCC's Fitzgibbon Cup panel.

== Club career ==
Barrett began his club career at juvenile and underage levels with the Blarney club. He had his first major success when Blarney beat Carrigaline by 1–11 to 0–12 to claim the Cork Premier 2 MHC title in 2016. He was still eligible for the minor grade two years later when Midleton beat Blarney by 1–22 to 1–10 to win the Cork Premier 1 MHC title.

Barrett immediately progressed to adult level and made his championship debut in April 2019 in a 0–24 to 2–12 defeat of Ballinhassig. He won a Cork PIHC medal in October 2020 after scoring two points from play in Blarney's 1–20 to 0–15 defeat of Castlelyons in the final. Barrett was the team's top scorer with 1–69 in 2023, when Blarney ended their Cork SAHC campaign with a defeat by Bride Rovers in a final replay.

== Inter-county career ==
Barrett first played for Cork as a member of the under-17 team during the holding of a one-off special championship in 2017. He won a Munster U17HC medal in this grade after a defeat of Waterford, before coming on as a substitute for Blake Murphy in Cork's subsequent 1–19 to 1–17 defeat of Dublin in the All-Ireland final. Barrett progressed to the minor team proper as captain the following year. After a year with no inter-county activity, he joined Cork's under-20 team in 2020. Success in this grade was immediate with Barrett claiming Munster and All-Ireland U20HC medals in 2020 after respective defeats of Tipperary and Dublin.

Barrett had one more year of under-20 hurling, however, his inclusion on the senior team in 2021 made him ineligible for the grade. Debuts in the National Hurling League and Munster SHC followed later that season. Barret came on as a substitute for Darragh Fitzgibbon when Cork suffered a 3–32 to 1–22 defeat by Limerick in the 2021 All-Ireland final. He was at centre-forward when Cork lost the 2022 National League final to Waterford.

Barrett lined out at centre-forward for Cork's 3–29 to 1–34 extra-time defeat by Clare in the 2024 All-Ireland final. He was presented with an All-Star award at the end of the 2024 season. Barrett claimed his first senior silverware in April 2025 when Cork won the National Hurling League title following a 3–24 to 0–23 win over Tipperary in the final. This was later followed by a Munster SHC medal after Cork's penalty shootout defeat of Limerick in the 2025 Munster final.

== Career statistics ==
=== Club ===
As of 3 October 2026

Team	Year	Cork PIHC	
Team	Year	Apps	Score
Blarney	2019	3	2-12
Blarney	2020	6	2-22
Blarney	Total	9	4-34
Blarney	Year	Cork SAHC	
Blarney	Year	Apps	Score
Blarney	2021	4	0-07
Blarney	2022	3	0-05
Blarney	2023	7	1-69
Blarney	2024	6	1-44
Blarney	2025	5	0-12
Blarney	2026	4	0-38
Blarney	Total	29	2-175
Career total		38	6-209

=== Inter-county ===
As of 4 July 2026

Team	Year	National League			Munster		All-Ireland		Total	
Team	Year	Division	Apps	Score	Apps	Score	Apps	Score	Apps	Score
Cork	2021	Division 1A	4	1-05	1	0-02	4	1-04	9	2-11
Cork	2022	Division 1A	6	0-09	4	0-02	0	0-00	10	0-11
Cork	2023	Division 1A	5	1-12	4	0-01	—		9	1-13
Cork	2024	Division 1A	5	0-06	4	1-07	4	1-11	13	2-24
Cork	2025	Division 1A	6	2-11	4	1-09	2	1-04	12	4-24
Cork	2026	Division 1A	6	0-15	5	1-12	2	1-06	13	2-33
Career total			32	4-58	22	3-33	12	4-25	66	11-116

== Honours ==
Christian Brothers College

- Dr O'Callaghan Cup: 2019

Blarney

- Cork Premier Intermediate Hurling Championship: 2020
- Cork Premier 2 Minor Hurling Championship: 2016

Cork

- Munster Senior Hurling Championship: 2025 (vc)
- National Hurling League: 2025 (vc)
- All-Ireland Under-20 Hurling Championship: 2020
- Munster Under-20 Hurling Championship: 2020
- All-Ireland Under-17 Hurling Championship: 2017
- Munster Under-17 Hurling Championship: 2017

Awards

- The Sunday Game Team of the Year: 2024
- All Star (1): 2024

Sporting positions
Preceded by Seán O'Leary-Hayes	Cork minor hurling team captain 2018	Succeeded by Daniel Hogan; Brian O'Sullivan
