= Mark Coleman (hurler) =

Irish hurler (born 1997)

Personal information
- Native name: Marc Ó Colmáin (Irish)
- Born: 23 December 1997 (age 28) Cork, Ireland
- Occupation: Compliance officer
- Height: 5 ft 10 in (178 cm)

Sport
- Sport: Hurling
- Position: Midfield
Clubs
- Years: Club
- 2014-present 2016 2017-2020: Blarney → Muskerry → University College Cork
Club titles
- Cork titles: 0
College
- Years: College
- 2016-2020: University College Cork
College titles
- Fitzgibbon titles: 2
Inter-county*
Years	County	Apps (scores)
2016-present	Cork	51 (2-35)
Inter-county titles
- Munster titles: 3
- All-Irelands: 0
- NHL: 1
- All Stars: 1
- *Inter County team apps and scores correct as of 19:30, 21 June 2026.

Mark Coleman (born 23 December 1997) is an Irish hurler who plays as a midfielder for club side Blarney, divisional side Muskerry and at inter-county level with the Cork senior hurling team.

== Playing career ==
=== Scoil Mhuire gan Smál ===
Coleman first came to prominence as a hurler with Scoil Mhuire Gan Smál in Blarney. Having played hurling in every grade during his time at the school, he usually lined out at midfield on the senior team. On 16 March 2016, he scored nine points as Scoil Mhuire Gan Smál defeated Roscommon CBS by 0–17 to 2–09 to take the All-Ireland title in the third tier Cusack Cup.

=== University College Cork ===
After lining out for the University College Cork freshers' team in his first year at university, Coleman was added to the senior team in advance of the 2020 Fitzgibbon Cup. On 23 February 2019, he won a Fitzgibbon Cup medal after lining out at midfield in UCC's 2–21 to 0–13 defeat of Mary Immaculate College in the final.

Coleman played in a second successive Fitzgibbon Cup final on 12 February 2020. Lining out at right wing-back, he ended the game with a second successive winners' medal after the 0–18 to 2–11 defeat of the Institute of Technology, Carlow.

=== Blarney ===
Coleman joined the Blarney club at a young age and played in all grades at juvenile and underage levels. On 24 May 2015, he made his championship debut and scored three points from frees in a 2–13 to 0–15 defeat of Kilworth. On 3 October 2020, Coleman scored 0-14 and was named man of the match when Blarney secured the Premier Intermnediate Championship title after defeating Castlelyons by 1–20 to 0–15 in the final. He was also the championship's top scorer with 1-50.

=== Cork ===
==== Minor and under-21 ====
Coleman first played for Cork at minor level in 2015, however, his sole season in the grade ended without success with a defeat by Limerick. On 23 June 2016, Coleman made his first appearance for the Cork under-21 hurling team, scoring 1–2 in Cork's seven-point defeat by Limerick. He also played in Cork's unsuccessful championship campaign in 2017. On 4 July 2018, Coleman won a Munster medal after scoring three points in Cork's 2–23 to 1–13 defeat of Tipperary in the final. On 26 August 2018, he was at centre-back in Cork's 3–13 to 1-16 All-Ireland final defeat by Tipperary in what was his last game in the grade. Coleman was later nominated for Player of the Year.

==== Senior ====
Coleman made his senior debut for Cork on 9 July 2016, replacing Stephen McDonnell for the final two minutes of an All-Ireland Qualifier against Wexford at Páirc Uí Rinn. He made his first start in a National League defeat of Clare on 11 February 2017, before making his first championship start later that season in a Munster Championship quarter-final against Tipperary. Coleman was a regular starter for Cork's subsequent championship games, with his performance against Waterford in the semi-final earning him the GAA/GPA Player of the Month award. On 9 July 2017, he won his first Munster medal following a 1–25 to 1–20 defeat of Clare in the final. Coleman ended the season with an All-Star award.

On 1 July 2018, Coleman won a second successive Munster medal following a 2–24 to 3–19 defeat of Clare in the final. He ended the season by being nominated for a second consecutive All-Star Award as well as Young Hurler of the Year.

== Career statistics ==
=== University ===
As of match played 23 February 2019.

Team	Year	Fitzgibbon Cup	
Team	Year	Apps	Score
University College Cork	2018	1	0-02
University College Cork	2019	6	0-08
Career total		7	0-10

=== Club ===
As of 3 October 2026

Team	Year	Cork PIHC	
Team	Year	Apps	Score
Blarney	2014	1	0-00
Blarney	2015	2	0-10
Blarney	2016	3	1-14
Blarney	2017	2	1-10
Blarney	2018	3	0-06
Blarney	2019	3	1-22
Blarney	2020	6	1-50
Blarney	Total	20	4-112
Blarney	Year	Cork SAHC	
Blarney	Year	Apps	Score
Blarney	2021	4	1-38
Blarney	2022	3	0-28
Blarney	2023	5	1-12
Blarney	2023	6	0-10
Blarney	2025	5	2-37
Blarney	2026	4	1-11
Blarney	Total	27	5-136
Career total		47	9-248

=== Division ===
As of match played 30 September 2018.

Team	Year	Cork PSHC	
Team	Year	Apps	Score
Muskerry	2016	2	0-05
Muskerry	Total	2	0-05
University College Cork	2017	3	0-05
University College Cork	2018	4	1-08
University College Cork	2019	2	0-03
University College Cork	2020	4	0-05
University College Cork	Total	13	1-21
Career total		15	1-26

=== Inter-county ===
As of 21 June 2026

Team	Year	National League			Munster		All-Ireland		Total	
Team	Year	Division	Apps	Score	Apps	Score	Apps	Score	Apps	Score
Cork	2016	Division 1A	0	0-00	0	0-00	1	0-00	1	0-00
Cork	2017	Division 1A	6	0-05	3	0-03	1	0-00	10	0-08
Cork	2018	Division 1A	3	0-00	5	0-06	1	0-02	9	0-08
Cork	2019	Division 1A	3	0-02	4	0-02	2	0-01	9	0-05
Cork	2020	Division 1A	4	0-03	1	0-02	2	0-00	7	0-05
Cork	2021	Division 1A	4	0-03	1	0-00	4	0-02	9	0-05
Cork	2022	Division 1A	6	0-13	4	0-05	2	0-04	12	0-22
Cork	2023	Division 1A	0	0-00	0	0-00	0	0-00	0	0-00
Cork	2024	Division 1A	2	0-00	4	0-01	4	0-04	10	0-05
Cork	2025	Division 1A	3	0-00	4	0-02	2	0-00	9	0-02
Cork	2026	Division 1A	4	0-06	5	2-02	1	0-01	10	2-09
Career total			35	0-32	31	2-21	20	0-14	86	2-67

== Honours ==
=== Team ===
Scoil Mhuire Gan Smál

- All-Ireland PPS Senior C Hurling Championship: 2016

University College Cork

- Fitzgibbon Cup: 2019, 2020

Blarney

- Cork Premier Intermediate Hurling Championship: 2020

Cork

- Munster Senior Hurling Championship: 2017, 2018, 2025
- National Hurling League: 2025
- Munster Senior Hurling League: 2017
- Munster Under-21 Hurling Championship: 2018

=== Individual ===
Awards

- GAA-GPA All-Star Award (1): 2017
- GAA/GPA Player of the Month (1): June 2017

Sporting positions
Preceded by Patrick Horgan	Cork senior hurling team captain 2022	Succeeded by Seán O'Donoghue
