= 2021 All-Ireland Senior Hurling Championship final =

- Event: 2021 All-Ireland Senior Hurling Championship
| Limerick | Cork |
| 3–32 | 1–22 |
- Date: 22 August 2021
- Venue: Croke Park, Dublin
- Man of the Match: Cian Lynch
- Referee: Fergal Horgan (Tipperary)
- Attendance: 82,000
- Weather: Dry with sunny spells 20 °C (68 °F)

The 2021 All-Ireland Senior Hurling Championship final was a hurling match played at Croke Park in Dublin on 22 August 2021 between Cork and Limerick, the culmination of the 2021 All-Ireland Senior Hurling Championship. It was the 134th final of that sport's primary competition, the All-Ireland Senior Hurling Championship.

Limerick won the game by 3–32 to 1–22 to claim their third All-Ireland title in four years. This final marked the highest winning score ever achieved in an All-Ireland Senior Hurling final, surpassing Kilkenny's previous record set in the 2008 final. The match was also the highest scoring final in the 134-year history of the fixture.

Due to COVID-19 restrictions, attendance was at 50% (40,000 people).

The match was televised live on RTÉ2 as part of The Sunday Game, presented by Joanne Cantwell from the outside studio at Croke Park with analysis by Anthony Daly, Donal Óg Cusack and Henry Shefflin. Commentary on the game was provided by Marty Morrissey alongside Michael Duignan. The match was also live on Sky Sports, with analysis from Jamesie O'Connor and Ollie Canning.

== Background ==
The two finalists share a Munster rivalry, with the sides having faced one another more than 100 times in the league and championship since their inaugural match in November 1893. The game was the 66th championship meeting between the sides and was their first time meeting in an All-Ireland final.

Limerick made their 19th All-Ireland final appearance and their third in the last four championship seasons, having missed out in 2019. However, they were undefeated in those recent finals appearances, beating Galway in 2018 and Waterford in 2020. Limerick's seven previous All-Ireland titles were secured at various intervals between 1897 and 1973. They were seeking their 10th All-Ireland title overall and their first ever consecutive titles.

Cork made their 50th All-Ireland final appearance overall and their first since defeat by Clare in 2013. They last won the title against Galway in 2005, meaning that the 16-year title drought equals their previous record of no titles between 1903 and 1919. Cork currently lie second only to Kilkenny on the all-time roll of honour and were seeking their 31st All-Ireland title, having won all their previous titles at various intervals between 1890 and 2005. For the first time since 1999, not one single member of the Cork team was a holder of an All-Ireland winners' medal.

This final was the fourth all-Munster final in the history of the championship, after 1997 between Clare and Tipperary, 2013 between Clare and Cork and 2020 between Limerick and Waterford. It was the eighth time when teams from the same province met.

This final marked the third meeting between the teams in the All-Ireland Championship proper. The series currently stood at one apiece, with Cork winning the 2006 All-Ireland quarter-final and Limerick winning the 2018 All-Ireland semi-final. Both sides had already played each other in the 2021 championship, with Limerick beating Cork by 2-22 to 1-17 in the Munster semi-final.

== Paths to the final ==
=== Limerick ===
| 3 July 2021 Munster Semi-final | Limerick | 2–22 (28) – (20) 1–17 | Cork | Thurles |
| 19:00 IST (UTC+1) | | | | Venue: Semple Stadium |
| | Gls: K Hayes 1, D O'Donovan 1. Pts: A Gillane 6 (6f), D Byrnes 3 (1f), C Lynch 3, P Casey 3, S Flanagan 2, G Hegarty 2, W O’Donoghue 1, G Mulcahy 1, D Reidy 1. | Report | Gls: S Kingston 1. Pts: P Horgan 5 (5f), J O’Connor 3, D Fitzgibbon 3, S Barrett 2, T O'Mahony 1, S Harnedy 1, R O'Flynn 1, S Kingston 1. | Referee: P O'Dwyer (Carlow); TV: Sky Sports |

| 18 July 2021 Munster Final | Limerick | 2–29 (35) – (30) 3–21 | Tipperary | Cork |
| 16:15 IST (UTC+1) | | (HT: 0–12 – 2–16) | | Venue: Páirc Uí Chaoimh |
| | Gls: S Flanagan 1, K Hayes 1. Pts: A Gillane 6 (4f), T Morrissey 6 (1f), P Casey 5, D Byrnes 4 (2f, 1 65), S Flanagan 3, G Hegarty 3, C Lynch 1, D Reidy 1. | Report | Gls: J Morris 1, J O'Dwyer 1, M Kehoe 1. Pts: J Forde 11 (3f, 1 65), J Morris 2, J O’Dwyer 2, R Maher 1, D McCormack 1, S Callanan 1, S Kennedy 1, W Connors 1, M Breen 1. | Referee: P O'Dwyer (Carlow); Attendance: 7,000; TV: RTÉ 2 |

| 7 August 2021 All-Ireland Semi-final | Limerick | 1–25 (28) – (17) 0–17 | Waterford | Dublin |
| 17:00 IST (UTC+1) | | (HT: 0-15 – 0-07) | | Venue: Croke Park |
| | | Report | | Referee: John Keenan (Wicklow); TV: RTÉ2; Sky Sports |

=== Cork ===
| 3 July 2021 Munster Semi-final | Limerick | 2–22 (28) – (20) 1–17 | Cork | Thurles |
| 19:00 IST (UTC+1) | | | | Venue: Semple Stadium |
| | Gls: K Hayes 1, D O'Donovan 1. Pts: A Gillane 6 (6f), D Byrnes 3 (1f), C Lynch 3, P Casey 3, S Flanagan 2, G Hegarty 2, W O’Donoghue 1, G Mulcahy 1, D Reidy 1. | Report | Gls: S Kingston 1. Pts: P Horgan 5 (5f), J O’Connor 3, D Fitzgibbon 3, S Barrett 2, T O'Mahony 1, S Harnedy 1, R O'Flynn 1, S Kingston 1. | Referee: P O'Dwyer (Carlow); TV: Sky Sports |

| 24 July 2021 Qualifier Round 2 | Cork | 3–19 (28) – (26) 1–23 | Clare | Limerick |
| 16:30 IST (UTC+1) | | | | Venue: Gaelic Grounds |
| | Gls: S Barrett 1, S Kingston 1, J O'Connor 1. Pts: P Horgan 10 (4fs, 3 65s); D Fitzgibbon 2, S Harnedy 2; L Meade 1, R O’Flynn 1, S Barrett 1, S Kingston 1; A Connolly 1. | Report | Gls: T Kelly 1. Pts: T Kelly 11 (1-0 pen, 8fs); C Malone 3; A McCarthy 2; R Hayes 1, D Ryan 1, D McInerney 1, C Galvin 1, I Galvin 1, R Taylor 1, S Golden 1. | Referee: J Keenan (Wicklow); TV: Sky Sports |

| 31 July 2021 All-Ireland Quarter-final | Dublin | 0–24 (24) – (32) 2–26 | Cork | Thurles |
| 19:00 IST (UTC+1) | | | | Venue: Semple Stadium |
| | Pts: D Burke 13 (7f, 1 65), C O'Sullivan 3, C Burke 2, D Sutcliffe 2, L Rushe 1, R McBride 1, C Boland 1, J Malone 1. | Report | Gls: T O'Mahony 1, S Kingston 1. Pts: P Horgan 12 (8fs, 1 65), S Harnedy 4, J O'Connor 3, R O'Flynn 2, C Cahalane 1, S Barrett 1, N O'Leary 1, T O'Mahony 1, A Connolly 1. | Referee: J Owens (Wexford); TV: Sky Sports |

| 8 August 2021 All-Ireland Semi-final | Kilkenny | 1–32 (35) – (40) 1–37 (a.e.t.) | Cork | Dublin |
| 15:30 IST (UTC+1) | | | | Venue: Croke Park |
| | | | | TV: RTÉ2; Sky Sports |

== Pre-match ==
=== Officials ===
On 10 August 2021, the GAA named Tipperary's Fergal Horgan as the referee for the final. Horgan has been an inter-county referee since joining the Munster panel of referees in 2011, before joining the national panel in 2012. He officiated three prior matches in the 2021 championship; the Leinster semi-final between Kilkenny and Wexford, the round 1 qualifier between Wexford and Clare and the All-Ireland semi-final between Cork and Kilkenny. Horgan also served as referee for the All-Ireland finals in 2017 and 2020. His umpire team was John Ryan (Cashel King Cormacs), Alan Horgan, Mick Butler, and Sean Bradshaw (all Knockavilla-Donaskeigh Kickhams). Wexford's James Owens was named as the standby referee. The other linesman were Seán Stack (Dublin) and the sideline official, Liam Gordon (Galway).

=== Pageantry ===
A number of traditional All-Ireland final elements returned for the first time since the 2019 All-Ireland final, however, a number of these were scaled back due to COVID-19 protocols. President Michael D. Higgins’ arrival was announced to the crowd but the custom of him meeting the players along with the GAA President did not take place. The pre-match parade featuring the Artane Band made a return.

1996 All-Ireland Championship winners Wexford were not honoured in the traditional fashion as this year's silver jubilee team. Instead, captain Martin Storey represented the team when he brought out the Liam MacCarthy Cup to the plinth on the pitch before the game.

== Match ==
=== Summary ===
Cian Lynch opened the scoring with a point for Limerick in the first minute. Gearóid Hegarty got the opening goal of the game after two minutes with a low shot after cutting in from the left to make it 1-1 to 0-1. Two minutes later Cork replied with a goal from Shane Kingston when he cut in from the left and shot high to the net. In the fifteenth minute, Aaron Gillane scored a second goal for Limerick with a low shot to the right corner of the net after a pass from Seamus Flanagan to make it 2-5 to 1-5. Limerick were ahead by 2-8 to 1-6 at the first water break. In the thirty-fifth minute, Gearóid Hegarty got a third goal for Limerick and his second when he ran in on goal and shot low to the left corner of the net. Limerick were ahead by thirteen points at half-time on a 3-18 to 1-11 scoreline. They kept Cork at bay in the second half and scored another fourteen points to eleven for Cork to win the game 3-32 to 1-22 and retain the title.

=== Details ===
RTÉ, Sky Sports

22 August 2021
15:30
All-Ireland Final

Report

| Limerick | 3-32 (41) – (25) 1-22 | Cork |
|---|---|---|
(HT: 3-18 (27) - (14) 1-11)
| Gls: G Hegarty 2, A Gillane 1. Pts: A Gillane 6 (3f), C Lynch 6, P Casey 5, T Morrissey 3, G Hegarty 2, D Byrnes 2 (1f), D Hannon 2, B Nash 1, D O'Donovan 1, S Flanagan 1, G Mulcahy 1, D Reidy 1, P Ryan 1. | | Gls: S Kingston 1. Pts: P Horgan 12 (10f), S Harnedy 4, N O'Leary 1, M Coleman 1 (f), L Meade 1, J O'Connor 1, S Barrett 1, A Cadogan 1. |

Croke Park, Dublin
Referee: Fergal Horgan (Tipperary)
Attendance: 40,000

Limerick
Cork

| GK | 1 | Nickie Quaid |
| B | 2 | Seán Finn |
| B | 3 | Dan Morrissey |
| B | 4 | Barry Nash |
| HB | 5 | Diarmaid Byrnes |
| HB | 6 | Declan Hannon (c) | (substituted off) 65' |
| HB | 7 | Kyle Hayes |
| MF | 8 | William O'Donoghue |
| MF | 9 | Darragh O'Donovan |
| FW | 10 | Gearóid Hegarty | (substituted off) 61' |
| FW | 11 | Cian Lynch |
| FW | 12 | Tom Morrissey | (substituted off) 69' |
| FW | 13 | Aaron Gillane |
| FW | 14 | Séamus Flanagan |
| FW | 15 | Peter Casey | (substituted off) 36' |
Substitutes:
| HB | 19 | Colin Coughlan | (substituted on) 65' |
| FW | 22 | Graeme Mulcahy | (substituted on) 36' (substituted off) 68' |
| FW | 23 | Barry Murphy | (substituted on) 68' |
| FW | 25 | David Reidy | (substituted on) 61' |
| FW | 26 | Pat Ryan | (substituted on) 69' |
Manager:
John Kiely

| GK | 1 | Patrick Collins |
| B | 2 | Niall O'Leary | (substituted off) 47' (c) |
| B | 3 | Robert Downey |
| B | 4 | Seán O'Donoghue | (substituted off) 52' |
| HB | 5 | Tim O'Mahony |
| HB | 6 | Mark Coleman |
| HB | 7 | Eoin Cadogan |
| MF | 8 | Darragh Fitzgibbon | (substituted off) 47' (b) |
| MF | 9 | Luke Meade |
| FW | 10 | Conor Cahalane | (substituted off) 35' |
| FW | 11 | Seamus Harnedy |
| FW | 12 | Robbie O'Flynn | (substituted off) 69' |
| FW | 13 | Jack O'Connor | (substituted off) 47' (a) |
| FW | 14 | Patrick Horgan |
| FW | 15 | Shane Kingston |
Substitutes:
| B | 17 | Seán O'Leary-Hayes | (substituted on) 47' (c) |
| HB | 19 | Damien Cahalane | (substituted on) 35' |
| B | 20 | Niall Cashman | (substituted on) 52' |
| FW | 22 | Alan Cadogan | (substituted on) 47' (a) |
| FW | 23 | Shane Barrett | (substituted on) 47' (b) |
| FW | 25 | Declan Dalton | (substituted on) 69' |
Manager:
Kieran Kingston
