= 2020 Cork Premier Intermediate Hurling Championship =

- Dates: 1 August 2020 – 3 October 2020
- Teams: 12
- Sponsor: Co-Op Superstores
- Champions: Blarney (2nd title); Peter Philpott (captain); Seán Crowley (captain); Paul O'Leary (manager)
- Runners-up: Castlelyons; Anthony Spillane (captain); Ciarán McGann (manager)
- Relegated: Blackrock

Tournament statistics
- Matches played: 24
- Goals scored: 59 (2.46 per match)
- Points scored: 829 (34.54 per match)
- Top scorer(s): Mark Coleman (1-50)

The 2020 Cork Premier Intermediate Hurling Championship was the 17th staging of the Cork Premier Intermediate Hurling Championship since its establishment by the Cork County Board in 2004. The draw for the group stage placings took place on 19 November 2019. The championship was scheduled to begin in April 2020, however, it was postponed indefinitely due to the coronavirus pandemic in Ireland. The championship began on 1 August 2020 and ended on 3 October 2020.

On 3 October 2020, Blarney won the championship after a 1-20 to 0-15 win over Castlelyons in the final at Páirc Uí Chaoimh. This was their second championship title overall and their first title since 2008.

Blarney's Mark Coleman was the championship's top scorer with 1-50.

== Format change ==
On 26 March 2019, three championship proposals were circulated to Cork club delegates. A core element running through all three proposals, put together by the Cork GAA games workgroup, was that there be a group stage of 12 teams and straight relegation and promotion. On 2 April 2019, a majority of 136 club delegates voted for Option A which would see one round of games played in April and two more in August – all with county players available.

== Team changes ==
=== To Championship ===
Promoted from the Cork Intermediate Hurling Championship

- Blackrock

=== From Championship ===
Promoted to the Cork Senior A Hurling Championship

- Cloyne
- Fermoy
- Fr. O'Neill's
- Kilworth
- Mallow

== Participating teams ==
The club rankings were based on a championship performance 'points' system over the previous four seasons.

Team	Location	Colours	Seeding	Ranking
Inniscarra	Inniscarra	Blue and white	A	1
Courcey Rovers	Ballinspittle	Red and white	A	2
Valley Rovers	Innishannon	Green and white	A	3
Ballinhassig	Ballinhassig	Blue and white	B	4
Carrigaline	Carrigaline	Blue and yellow	B	5
Blarney	Blarney	Red and white	B	6
Castlelyons	Castlelyons	Green and yellow	C	7
Watergrasshill	Watergrasshill	Red and white	C	8
Aghada	Aghada	Green and white	C	9
Ballincollig	Ballincollig	Green and white	D	10
Youghal	Youghal	Maroon and yellow	D	11
Blackrock	Blackrock	Green and yellow	D	12

== Fixtures/results ==
=== Group 1 ===
==== Table ====
Advance to knockout stage

Team	Matches				Score			Pts
Team	Pld	W	D	L	For	Against	Diff	Pts
Carrigaline	3	3	0	0	7-65	3-52	25	6
Courcey Rovers	3	1	0	2	5-56	3-55	7	2
Youghal	3	1	0	2	5-47	8-54	-16	2
Aghada	3	1	0	2	3-47	6-54	-16	2

==== Results ====
1 August 2020 Round 1	Courcey Rovers	1-17 - 0-26	Carrigaline	Jack Barrett Park
	R Nyhan 1-1, R Sweetnam 0-9 (8f), S Nyhan 0-3 (3f), A O'Donovan 0-2, M Collins, J McCarthy 0-1 each.	Report	B Kelleher 0-11 (6f, 65), D Drake 0-5, W O'Brien 0-3, T Murphy, R O'Shea 0-2 each, C Vaughan, R Kelleher, E Desmond 0-1 each.	Referee: B Coniry (Crosshaven)

2 August 2020 Round 1	Aghada	1-19 - 2-11	Youghal	Killeagh Sportsfield
	W Leahy 0-12 (0-9 f), J Looney 1-3, C Fleming, A Berry, J O’Hanlon, A Stafford 0-1 each.	Report	B Moloney 1-5 (0-4 f), B Cooper 1-2, P Kirk 0-2, O Dempsey, N Roche 0-1 each.	Referee: P O'Driscoll (Bride Rovers)

8 August 2020 Round 2	Carrigaline	2-21 - 2-15	Aghada	Páirc Uí Chonaill
	B Kelleher 0-9 (8 frees), R O’Shea 1-2, D McBarron 1-0, S O’Brien and D Drake 0-3 each, E Desmond 0-2, K Kavanagh and D Griffin 0-1 each.	Report	W Leahy 1-8 (1-0 pen, 0-5 frees), C Fleming 1-0, J Looney 0-3, P O’Neill 0-2, M McCarthy and A Stafford 0-1 each.	Referee: P Lyons (Bishopstown)

8 August 2020 Round 2	Youghal	3-16 - 2-17	Courcey Rovers	Caherlag Sportsfield
	B Cooper 1-3, A Joyce 1-0, R McMahon 1-0, J O’Mahony 0-3, P Kirk 0-3, B Moloney 0-3 (0-2 f), O Dempsey, C O’Mahony 0-2 each.	Report	R Sweetnam 1-9 (0-8 f), T O’Sullivan 1-2, S Nyhan 0-1 f, A O’Donovan 0-1 sl, J O’Neill, M Collins, M O’Donovan, J McCarthy 0-1 each.	Referee: J Larkin (Ballinora)

28 August 2020 Round 3	Carrigaline	5-18 - 0-20	Youghal	Páirc Séamus de Barra
	D Drake 2-3, D McBarron 3-0, B Kelleher 0-8 (0-6 f), R Kelleher 0-3, E Desmond 0-4.	Report	B Moloney 0-12 (0-8 f), B Cooper 0-5, J O’Mahony, A Joyce, N Roche 0-1 each.	Referee: C Egan (Glen Rovers)

28 August 2020 Round 3	Courcey Rovers	2-22 - 0-13	Aghada	Pairc Ui Rinn
	R Sweetnam 1-9 (0-6 frees, 0-1 65), A O’Donovan 1-2, T O’Sullivan 0-4, O Crowley, B Ryan and R Nyhan 0-2 each, J O’Neill 0-1.	Report	W Leahy 0-8 (0-7 frees), J Looney 0-2, C Fleming, T Hartnett and A Berry 0-1 each.	Referee: D Kirwan (Éire Óg)

=== Group 2 ===
==== Table ====
Advance to knockout stage Advance to relegation play-offs

Team	Matches				Score			Pts
Team	Pld	W	D	L	For	Against	Diff	Pts
Watergrasshill	3	3	0	0	3-57	2-49	11	6
Ballincollig	3	1	1	1	3-47	1-50	3	3
Ballinhassig	3	1	1	1	2-43	2-47	-4	3
Valley Rovers	3	0	0	3	0-49	3-50	-10	0

==== Results ====
2 August 2020 Round 1	Valley Rovers	0-17 - 1-16	Ballinhassig	Riverstick Sportsfield
	C Butler (0-7, 0-4 frees), C O’Leary (0-4, 0-3 frees, 0-1 65), J Cottrell and A Kenneally (0-2 each), E O’Reilly and C Desmond (0-1 each).	Report	F O’Leary (1-1), R Lombard and M Collins (0-3 each), G Collins (frees), C Reynolds, and C Tyers (0-2 each), D O’Donovan (65), S O’Neill and C Desmond (0-1 each).	Referee: M Maher (St. Finbarr's)

2 August 2020 Round 1	Watergrasshill	1-22 - 1-18	Ballincollig	Blarney Sportsfield
	S O'Regan (0-7, 6f), S Desmond (1-3), D O'Leary (0-4), P O'Leary, K O'Neill, S Óg O'Regan (0-2 each), P Cronin, A Cronin (0-1 each).	Report	C Dorgan (1-8, 4f), S Walsh, F Denny (0-3 each), R Bourke, C O'Leary (0-2 each).

8 August 2020 Round 2	Ballincollig	2-16 - 0-15	Valley Rovers	Cloughduv Sportsfield
	C Dorgan 0-8 (0-6 f, 0-1 65), G O'Donoghue 1-1, D Bowen 1-0, S Walsh 0-3, F Denny 0-2, R Bourke, C O’Leary 0-1 each.	Report	C O'Leary 0-5 (0-4 f, 0-1 65), J Cottrell 0-2, C Butler 0-2 (0-1 f), C Kilduff, J Lynch, K Canty, T O'Brien, C Desmond, A Kenneally 0-1 each.	Referee: N O'Neill (Midleton)

8 August 2020 Round 2	Ballinhassig	1-14 - 2-17	Watergrasshill	Inniscarra
	G Collins 1-1, F O’Leary 0-6 (0-4 f), M Collins, P Collins 0-2 each, E Cullinane, D O’Donovan 0-1 each.	Report	S O'Regan 0-10 (0-9 f), S Desmond 1-4, S Óg O'Regan 1-2, D Dennehy 0-1.	Referee: C Dineen (Douglas)

28 August 2020 Round 3	Ballinhassig	0-13 - 0-13	Ballincollig	Cloughduv
	F O’Leary (0-7, 0-5 frees), C Tyers (0-2), C Reynolds, R Lombard, C Grainger and M Collins (0-1 each).	Report	C Dorgan (0-8, 0-6 frees, 0-1 65), S Walsh (0-4), R Doherty (0-1).	Referee: P O'Driscoll (Bride Rovers)

28 August 2020 Round 3	Valley Rovers	0-17 - 0-18	Watergrasshill	Ovens
	C O’Leary (0-11, 8 frees), K Canty (0-4), J Cottrell and A Kenneally (0-1 each).	Report	S O’Regan (0-5, 4 frees), D O’Leary (0-4), S Óg O’Regan (0-3), A Cronin (0-2), B Fenton, K O’Neill, G Kelly Lynch and A Foley (0-1 each).

=== Group 3 ===
==== Table ====
Advance to knockout stage Advance to relegation play-offs

Team	Matches				Score			Pts
Team	Pld	W	D	L	For	Against	Diff	Pts
Castlelyons	3	3	0	0	7-58	2-49	24	6
Blarney	3	2	0	1	4-60	2-45	21	4
Inniscarra	3	1	0	2	3-47	5-57	-16	2
Blackrock	3	0	0	3	2-43	7-57	-29	0

==== Results ====
1 August 2020 Round 1	Inniscarra	0-12 - 1-23	Blarney	Coachford Sportsfield
	F O'Leary, S O'Donoghue (0-1 f) 0-3 each, S O'Mahony 0-2, D O'Keeffe 0-2 f, C Lombard, O McCarthy 0-1 each	Report	S Barrett 1-7, M Coleman 0-5 (0-3 f), P Power 0-3 (0-1 f), B Ahern, D Hanlon 0-2 each, C Murphy, K Costello, P Crowley, J Jordan 0-1 each.	Referee: P Lyons (Bishopstown)

2 August 2020 Round 1	Castlelyons	3-20 - 0-14	Blackrock	Páirc Lios gCúl
	C Spillane 1-7, A Spillane 1-1, D Morrisson 1-0, M Spillane 0-5 (0-4 f), B Murphy 0-2, E Maye, K O'Leary, A Fenton, L Doocey, N O'Leary 0-1 each.	Report	E O'Farrell 0-10 (0-6 f), P Lenighan 0-2, C McCarthy, L O'Sullivan 0-1 each.	Referee: J Murphy (Castletownroche)

8 August 2020 Round 2	Blarney	1-14 - 1-20	Castlelyons	Páirc Shéamuis de Barra
	P Power and M Coleman 0-4 each, S Barrett 0-3, K Costello 1-0, D Hanlon 0-2, P Crowley 0-1.	Report	C Spillane 1-5, M Spillane, K O’Leary 0-4 each, A Spillane 0-2, N O’Leary, C O’Neill, A Fenton, L Ducey and J Kearney 0-1 each.	Referee: A O'Connor (Ballygarvan)

9 August 2020 Round 2	Blackrock	1-16 - 2-14	Inniscarra	Ballinora Sportsfield
	E O’Farrell (1-12, 1-7 frees, 1 65), C O’Leary, I O’Keeffe, C McCarthy, N Cashman (0-1 each).	Report	O McCarthy (1-2), F O’Leary (0-5), S O’Donoghue (0-3, 2 frees), C Casey (1-0), D O’Keeffe (0-2), E O’Connor, C Bennett (0-1 each).

28 August 2020 Round 3	Blarney	2-23 - 1-13	Blackrock	Riverstown
	M Coleman 0-13 (0-8f, 0-2 sl), S Barrett 1-2 D Hannon 1-1, P Crowley 0-3, P Power, B Ahern, O Hegarty, M O’Leary (0-1 each).	Report	E O’Farrell 0-7 (0-6f), J Logue 1-0, O Kelleher 0-4 (0-3f), C O’Leary 0-2.

28 August 2020 Round 3	Inniscarra	1-21 - 3-18	Castlelyons	Pairc Ui Chaoimh
	D O’Keeffe 0-10 (0-8f, 0-1 65), S O’Donoghue 1-3, O McCarthy 0-3, S O’Mahony, F O’Leary 0-2 each, E O’Connor 0-1.	Report	A Spillane 1-6, D Morrison 2-0, A Fenton 0-4 (0-3f), E Maye 0-3, B Murphy 0-2, M Spillane, C Spillane, J Kearney 0-1 each.

=== Knock-out stage ===
==== Bracket ====
Quarter-Finals
1B	Watergrasshill	1-15
2A	Courcey Rovers	1-21
2C	Blarney	3-14
2B	Ballincollig	1-19

Semi-Finals
1C	Castlelyons	1-23
2A	Courcey Rovers	1-17
1A	Carrigaline	1-12
2C	Blarney	4-20

Final
1C	Castlelyons	0-15
2C	Blarney	1-20

==== Relegation playoff ====
11 September 2020 Playoff	Valley Rovers	0-20 - 1-14	Blackrock	Páirc Uí Rinn
	C O’Leary 0-15 (0-12 frees), J Walsh 0-2, C Kilduff, S O’Regan, K Canty 0-1 each.	Report	E O’Farrell 0-6 (0-4 frees, 0-1 65), D Cashman 1-0, O Kelleher 0-2, R Coleman, A O’Callaghan, C O’Brien, C O’Leary, L O’Sullivan, G Regan 0-1 each.

==== Quarter-finals ====
12 September 2020 Quarter-final	Watergrasshill	1-15 - 1-21	Courcey Rovers	Ballyanley Sportsfield
	S O’Regan (0-8, 0-7 frees), S Óg O Regan (1-5, 0-1 free), D O’Leary (0-2).	Report	R Sweetnam (0-11, 0-6 frees), R Nyhan (0-4), A O’Donovan (1-0), T O’Sullivan (0-3), J O’Neill (0-2), B Ryan (0-1).

12 September 2020 Quarter-final	Blarney	3-14 - 1-19	Ballincollig	Páirc Uí Rinn
	M Coleman (0-7, 6 frees), D Hanlon (2-0), P Crowley (1-1), A McEvoy (0-3), M O’Leary, S Barrett, and P Power (0-1 each).	Report	C Dorgan (0-7, 4 frees), F Denny (1-1), S Walsh (0-4), R Bourke (0-3), C O’Leary (0-2), C Sexton and D Bowen (0-1 each).

==== Semi-finals ====
19 September 2020 Semi-final	Castlelyons	1-23 - 1-17	Courcey Rovers	Páirc Uí Rinn
	A Spillane (1-6), M Spillane (0-5, 2 frees, 1 ’65), C Spillane and A Fenton (2 frees) (0-3 each), K O’Leary and B Murphy (0-2 each), T Carroll and J Kearney (0-1 each).	Report	R Sweetnam (0-6, 4 frees), S Twomey (1-0), A O’Donovan, J O’Neill and T O’Sullivan (0-2 each), S Nyhan (free), R Nyhan, O Crowley, M O’Donovan and L Jeffries (0-1 each).

19 September 2020 Semi-final	Carrigaline	1-12 - 4-20	Blarney	Páirc Uí Rinn
	B Kelleher (0-7, 0-6 frees); R O’Shea (1-0); E Desmond (0-2); D Drake, R Kelleher, K O’Reilly (0-1 each).	Report	P Power (3-2); M Coleman (1-7, 0-6 frees); S Barrett (0-7); D Hanlon, K Costello (0-2 each).

==== Final ====
3 October 2020 Final	Castlelyons	0-15 - 1-20	Blarney	Páirc Uí Chaoimh
	M Spillane (0-10, 0-7 frees, 0-1 65), A Spillane and A Fenton (0-2 each) N O’Leary (0-1).	Report	M Coleman (0-14, 0-8 frees, 0-1 65), P Power (1-2), S Barrett (0-2), P Crowley and M O’Leary (0-1 each).	Referee: C O'Regan (Ballyhea)

== Championship statistics ==
=== Top scorers ===
Overall

Rank	Player	Club	Tally	Total	Matches	Average
1	Mark Coleman	Blarney	1-50	53	6	8.83
2	Richie Sweetnam	Courcey Rovers	2-44	50	5	10.00
3	Eoin O'Farrell	Blackrock	1-35	38	4	9.50
4	Brian Kelleher	Carrigaline	0-35	35	4	8.75
4	Chris O'Leary	Valley Rovers	0-35	35	4	8.75
6	Cian Dorgan	Ballincollig	1-31	34	4	8.50
7	William Leahy	Aghada	1-28	31	3	10.
8	Shane O'Regan	Watergrasshill	0-30	30	4	7.50
9	Shane Barrett	Blarney	2-22	28	6	4.66
10	Anthony Spillane	Castlelyons	3-17	26	5	5.20

In a single game

Rank	Player	Club	Tally	Total	Opposition
1	Eoin O'Farrell	Blackrock	1-12	15	Inniscarra
1	Chris O'Leary	Valley Rovers	0-15	15	Blackrock
3	Mark Coleman	Blarney	0-14	14	Castlelyons
4	Mark Coleman	Blarney	0-13	13	Blackrock
5	Richie Sweetnam	Courcey Rovers	1-09	12	Youghal
5	Richie Sweetnam	Courcey Rovers	1-09	12	Aghada
5	Brett Moloney	Youghal	0-12	12	Carrigaline
5	William Leahy	Aghada	0-12	12	Youghal
9	Pádraig Power	Blarney	3-02	11	Carrigaline
9	Cian Dorgan	Ballincollig	1-08	11	Watergrasshill
9	William Leahy	Aghada	1-08	11	Carrigaline
9	Brian Kelleher	Carrigaline	0-11	11	Courcey Rovers
9	Chris O'Leary	Valley Rovers	0-11	11	Watergrasshill
9	Richie Sweetnam	Courcey Rovers	0-11	11	Watergrasshill

=== Match records ===
- Widest winning margin: 17 points
  - Blarney 4-20 - 1-12 Carrigaline (Semi-final)
- Most goals in a match: 5
  - Youghal 3-16 - 2-17 Courcey Rovers (Group Stage Round 2)
  - Carrigaline 5-18 - 0-20 Youghal (Group Stage Round 3)
  - Blarney 4-20 - 1-12 Carrigaline (Semi-final)
- Most points in a match: 43
  - Carrigaline 0-26 - 1-17 Courcey Rovers (Group Stage Round 1)
- Most goals by one team in a match: 5
  - Carrigaline 5-18 - 0-20 Youghal (Group Stage Round 3)
- Most goals scored by a losing team: 2
  - Youghal 2-11 - 1-19 Aghada (Group Stage Round 1)
  - Aghada 2-15 - 2-21 Carrigaline (Group Stage Round 2)
  - Courcey Rovers 2-17 - 3-16 Youghal (Group Stage Round 2)
- Most points scored by a losing team: 21
  - Inniscarra 1-21 - 3-18 Castlelyons (Group Stage Round 3)
