= Eoghan Keniry =

Irish hurler

Personal information
- Native name: Eoghan Mac Innéirí (Irish)
- Born: 1996 (age 29–30) Killeagh, County Cork, Ireland
- Occupation: CTRM Consultant

Sport
- Sport: Hurling
- Position: Centre-forward
Club
Years	Club	Apps (scores)
2013-present	Killeagh	21 (7-78)
Club titles
- Cork titles: 0
College
- Years: College
- 2015-2019: University College Cork
College titles
- Fitzgibbon titles: 0
Inter-county
Years	County	Apps (scores)
2018	Cork	0 (0-00)
Inter-county titles
- Munster titles: 0
- All-Irelands: 0
- NHL: 0
- All Stars: 0

Eoghan Keniry (born 1996) is an Irish hurler who plays for club side Killeagh. He is a former member of the Cork senior hurling team. Keniry usually lines out as a forward.

== Career ==
Keniry first came to hurling prominence at juvenile and underage levels with the Killeagh-St Ita's amalgamation. He simultaneously lined out at colleges' level with Midleton CBS Secondary School before joining the Killeagh senior team. Keniry first appeared on the inter-county scene as a member of the Cork minor hurling team and scored 2–04 in his debut against Kerry in 2014. He spent one season with the Cork under-21 side. Keniry was a member of the extended panel for the Cork senior hurling team at the start of the 2018 season and lined out in the pre-season Munster League.

== Career statistics ==
=== Club ===
As of match played 16 September 2023.

Team	Year	Cork SHC	
Team	Year	Apps	Score
Killeagh	2013	4	1-07
Killeagh	2014	2	1-03
Killeagh	2015	4	1-11
Killeagh	2016	1	1-06
Killeagh	2017	4	3-24
Killeagh	2018	4	0-23
Killeagh	2019	2	0-04
Killeagh	Total	21	7-78
Killeagh	Year	Cork SAHC	
Killeagh	Year	Apps	Score
Killeagh	2020	4	1-20
Killeagh	2021	3	1-28
Killeagh	2022	4	2-42
Killeagh	2023	4	0-06
Total		15	4-96
Career total		36	11-174

== Honours ==
Midleton CBS

- Dr. O'Callaghan Cup: 2012

Killeagh-St. Ita's

- Cork Under-21 B Hurling Championship: 2014
