= 2026 Cork Senior A Hurling Championship =

Annual hurling competition season

- Dates: 1 August – 1 November 2026
- Teams: 12
- Sponsor: Co-Op Superstores
- Champions: Erin's Own (1st title); Cormac Dooley (captain); Brendan O'Riordan (manager)
- Runners-up: Carrigtwohill; Aaron Walsh-Barry (captain); Denis Walsh (manager)
- Relegated: Fermoy

Tournament statistics
- Matches played: 24
- Goals scored: 48 (2 per match)
- Points scored: 953 (39.71 per match)
- Top scorer: Conor Lenihan (2–37)

The 2026 Cork Senior A Hurling Championship was the seventh staging of the Cork Senior A Hurling Championship since its establishment by the Cork County Board in 2020. The draw for the group stage placings took place on 9 December 2025. The championship ran from 1 August to 1 November 2026.

The final was played on 1 November 2026 at SuperValu Páirc Uí Chaoimh in Cork, between Erin's Own and Carrigtwohill, in what was their first ever meeting in the final. Erin's Own won the match by 1–17 to 0–15 to claim their first ever championship title in the grade.

Conor Lenihan was the championship's top scorer with 2–37.

== Team changes ==
=== To Championship ===
Relegated from the Cork Premier Senior Hurling Championship

- Erin's Own

Promoted from the Cork Premier Intermediate Hurling Championship

- Ballinhassig

=== From Championship ===
Promoted to the Cork Premier Senior Hurling Championship

- Bride Rovers

Relegated to the Cork Premier Intermediate Hurling Championship

- Bishopstown

== Group 1 ==
=== Group 1 table ===
Semi-finalist Quarter-finalist Relegation playoff

Team	Matches				Score			Pts
Team	Pld	W	D	L	For	Against	Diff	Pts
Blarney	3	3	0	0	80	60	20	6
Watergrasshill	3	2	0	1	68	64	4	4
Castlelyons	3	1	0	2	77	69	8	2
Ballyhea	3	0	0	3	60	92	-32	0

=== Group 1 results ===
1 August 2026 Round 1	Blarney	1-21 - 1-20	Castlelyons	Riverstown Sportsfield
	S Barrett (0-9, 0-8 frees), M Coleman (1-2, 1-1 frees), C Hegarty (0-3), C Barrett (0-3), P Crowley (0-2), P Power and O Hegarty (0-1 each).	Report	A Fenton (0-10, 0-8 frees, 0-1 65), L Doocey (1-2), A Spillane (0-3), C Spillane, N O’Leary, J Kearney, K O’Leary and O Hallihan (0-1 each).

1 August 2026 Round 1	Watergrasshill	1-23 - 1-17	Ballyhea	Kildorrery Grounds
	S O'Regan 0-8 (0-5 f), A Murphy 0-6, S Desmond 1-2, C O’Leary 0-2, D O’Leary, B Lehane, A Foley (f), P Cronin, K O’Neill 0-1 each.	Report	P Daly 0-8 (0-6 f, 0-1 65), T Hanley 0-5, C Crowley 1-0, P O’Callaghan (f), D Copps, K Morrissey, E O’Leary 0-1 each.

23 August 2026 Round 2	Castlelyons	3-13 - 2-19	Watergrasshill	Páirc na Bríde
	L Doocey (2-1); A Fenton (1-4, 1-2 frees); K O’Leary (0-2); C Spillane, D Morrisson, A Spillane, S Cotter, O Lenehan, B Murphy (0-1 each).	Report	A Murphy (2-4); S O’Regan (0-4, 0-2 frees, 0-2 65s); S Desmond (0-3); D O’Leary, B Lehane (0-2 each); A Foley (free), D Roche, A Cronin, L Foley (0-1 each).

23 August 2026 Round 2	Ballyhea	0-20 - 2-28	Blarney	O'Connell Park
	P O’Callaghan (0-6, 0-4 frees, 0-1 65), E O’Leary (0-4), J Hickey (0-3, 0-2 frees), W Carroll and J Morrissey (0-2 each), Tiernan Hanley, M O’Sullivan and Tom Hanley (0-1 each).	Report	S Barrett (0-10, 0-7 frees), P Power (1-2), C Hegarty (1-1), C Barrett and D Hanlon (0-3 each), O Hegarty, A McEvoy, D McSweeney and E Kirby (0-2 each), M Coleman (0-1).

5 September 2026 Round 3	Blarney	0-22 - 1-14	Watergrasshill	Grenagh Grounds
	S Barrett 0-11 (0-8 f, 0-1 65), M Coleman 0-4 (0-2 65, 0-1 f), C Hegarty, E Kirby 0-2 each, S Mullane, D McSweeney, D Hanlon 0-1 each.	Report	S O’Regan 0-6 (0-4 f, 0-1 65), S Desmond 1-2, A Murphy 0-3, D Roche, D O’Leary, B Lehane 0-1 each.

5 September 2026 Round 3	Castlelyons	3-23 - 0-20	Ballyhea	Mallow GAA Complex
	A Fenton (1-8, 1-3 frees), A Spillane (1-2), O Lenehan (1-1), K O’Leary (0-3), J Kearney, O Hallihan and C Spillane (0-2 each), E Maye, J O’Leary and D Morrisson (0-1 each).	Report	P Daly (0-15, 0-13 frees, 0-2 65s), Tiernan Hanley (0-3), E O’Leary (0-2).

== Group 2 ==
=== Group 2 table ===
Semi-finalist Quarter-finalist Relegation playoff

Team	Matches				Score			Pts
Team	Pld	W	D	L	For	Against	Diff	Pts
Erin's Own	3	3	0	0	68	49	19	6
Na Piarsaigh	3	2	0	1	77	64	13	4
Killeagh	3	1	0	3	57	70	-13	2
Fermoy	3	0	0	3	60	79	-19	0

=== Group 2 results ===
1 August 2026 Round 1	Na Piarsaigh	0-15 - 1-19	Erin's Own	Páirc Uí Rinn
	D Connery 0-8 (0-5f), P Rourke 0-2, K Moynihan 0-2, O Galvin, P Guest, L Sheehan (0-1 each).	Report	C Lenihan 1-5 (0-3f), R O’Flynn 0-5, M O’Riordan 0-3, P O’Shea 0-2, C Dunphy -0-2, O O’Regan (f), S Irwin (0-1 each).

1 August 2026 Round 1	Killeagh	1-19 - 1-16	Fermoy	Páirc Lios gCúl
	Barry Walsh 1-4, D McCarthy 0-5 (0-4 f), E Lane, E Keniry 0-3 each, R McCarthy 0-2, R Sinclair, Ben Walsh 0-1 each.	Report	F Lardner 1-7 (1-6 f), B Twomey 0-3, S Aherne 0-2, D O'Callaghan, A Aherne, B Daly, J O'Keeffe (f) 0-1 each.

22 August 2026 Round 2	Fermoy	3-13 - 0-32	Na Piarsaigh	Castlelyons Grounds
	F Lardner 1-7 (0-4 f), D Lardner 1-1, B Twomey 1-0, S Aherne 0-2, C Roche, D Daly, J O’Keeffe 0-1 each.	Report	R O’Sullivan 0-11 (0-2 f), D Connery 0-7 (0-4 f), P Guest, K Moynihan, D Scanlon, C Hogan 0-3 each, P Rourke, C Buckley 0-1 each.

23 August 2026 Round 2	Erin's Own	2-15 - 0-15	Killeagh	Castlemartyr Grounds
	C Lenihan 1-8 (0-4 f), F O’Brien 1-0, B Óg Murphy 0-2, P O’Shea, R O’Flynn, O O’Regan 0-1 each.	Report	Barry Walsh 0-7 (0-5 f), R McCarthy 0-2, J Fogarty, S Smiddy, A Walsh, E Lane, E Keniry 0-1 each.

5 September 2026 Round 3	Fermoy	0-19 - 3-16	Erin's Own	Páirc na Bríde
	F Lardner 0-10 (0-9 f), C Fitapatrick 0-2, D Daly, S Aherne, D Lardner, C Roche, K Morrison, P De Roiste, J O’Keeffe 0-1 each.	Report	C Lenihan 0-9 (0-5 f, 0-2 65), R O’Flynn, F O’Brien 1-2 each, O O’Regan 1-1 (0-1 f), C Dooley, M O’Riordan 0-1 each.

5 September 2026 Round 3	Killeagh	1-17 - 1-27	Na Piarsaigh	Clonmult Memorial Park
	Barry Walsh (1-6, 1-0 pen, 0-3 f), R McCarthy (0-4), E Lane (0-2), Ben Walsh, R Sinclair, D Walsh, E Keniry, D Buckley (0-1 each).	Report	D Connery (0-9, 0-5 f, 0-1 65), K Moynihan (0-7), G Healy (1-1), R O’Sullivan (0-4, 0-2 f), P Rourke (0-3), C Hogan, L Sheehan, P Guest (0-1 each).

== Group 3 ==
=== Group 3 table ===
Quarter-finalist

Team	Matches				Score			Pts
Team	Pld	W	D	L	For	Against	Diff	Pts
Ballinhassig	3	1	2	0	65	62	3	4
Carrigtwohill	3	1	1	1	69	63	6	3
Courcey Rovers	3	1	1	1	70	73	-3	3
Inniscarra	3	1	0	2	60	66	-6	2

=== Group 3 results ===
1 August 2026 Round 1	Ballinhassig	0-23 - 0-23	Courcey Rovers	Kilbrittain Grounds
	G Collins 0-7 (0-5 f), S O’Neill 0-4, P Collins 0-3 f, J Grainger, E Cullinane 0-2 each, C Grainger, M Collins, S Lombard, T Madden, D O’Sullivan 0-1 each.	Report	R Sweetnam 0-11 (0-9 f, 0-1 65), S Nyhan (0-2 f), D O’Donovan 0-3 each, J O’Neill 0-2, R O’Callaghan, D Cosgrave, M O’Donovan, T O’Sullivan 0-1 each.

1 August 2026 Round 1	Carrigtwohill	0-18 - 0-22	Inniscarra	Blarney Grounds
	J Mulcahy 0-5 (0-2 f), J Oke, C O’Riordan, P Walsh 0-3 each, M Barrett 0-2 (0-1 65), P Hogan, S Brennan 0-1 each.	Report	J Enright 0-7 (0-4f ), B Daly, S O’Donoghue, P Holland, D Murphy, D O’Brien, C Geoghegan 0-2 each, A McCarthy, D Enright, A O’Connell 0-1 each.

21 August 2026 Round 2	Courcey Rovers	1-18 - 2-25	Carrigtwohill	Páirc Uí Rinn
	D O’Donovan (1-2, 0-1 sl), R Sweetnam (0-5, 0-4 frees), T O’Sullivan (0-3, 0-1 free), S Twomey (0-2), S Nyhan (free), DJ Twomey, D Cosgrave, J O’Neill, D Lordan and M O’Donovan (0-1 each).	Report	J Mulcahy (0-9, 0-1 free), M Barrett (1-4, 1-3 frees, 0-1 65), P Walsh (0-5), C O’Riordan (0-4), D Nolan (1-0), J Oke, L O’Sullivan and S Rohan (0-1 each).

23 August 2026 Round 2	Inniscarra	1-16 - 1-19	Ballinhassig	Éire Óg Grounds
	J Enright 0-9 (0-8 f), D O’Keeffe 1-1, A O’Connell 0-3, A McCarthy, D Murphy, C Geoghegan 0-1.	Report	G Collins 0-9 (0-7 f), C Desmond 0-3, M Collins 1-0, S O’Neill, E Cullinane 0-2 each, P Collins, Darragh O’Sullivan, S McCarthy 0-1 each.

5 September 2026 Round 3	Carrigtwohill	1-17 - 1-17	Ballinhassig	Páirc Uí Rinn
	M Barrett 1-2 (0-1f, 0-1 65), C O'Riordan, J Mulcahy (0-1f) 0-4 each, P Walsh 0-2, B Twomey, J Horgan, L O'Sullivan, T Hogan, S Rohan 0-1 each.	Report	B Lynch 1-2, E Cullinane 0-4, G Colins 0-3 (0-2f, 0-1 65), Darragh O'Sullivan 0-2, P Collins (0-1f), J Grainger, P O'Regan, A O'Sullivan (0-1f), R Lombard, Diarmuid O'Sullivan 0-1 each.

5 September 2026 Round 3	Inniscarra	1-16 - 1-23	Courcey Rovers	Carrigaline Grounds
	J Enright 0-5 (0-4 f), J O’Mahony 1-1, D O’Brien 0-4, A O’Connell 0-2, S O’Donoghue, P Holland, C Dineen, D Murphy 0-1 each.	Report	R Sweetnam 0-11 (0-9 f, 0-1 65), D O’Donovan 1-3, T O’Sullivan, J O’Neill 0-3 each, B Ryan, S Twomey, D Lordan 0-1 each.

== Relegation stage ==
=== Relegation final ===
19 September 2026 Playoff	Ballyhea	1-17 - 0-15	Fermoy	Kildorrery Grounds
	P Daly (0-7, 0-5 f, 0-1 65), T Hanley (0-4, 0-1 sdl), E O’Leary (1-0), M O’Sullivan, J Morrissey (0-2 each), C Cox, K Morrissey (0-1 each).	Report	F Lardner (0-9 f), K Morrisson (0-3), S Aherne, D Lardner, P De Róiste (0-1 each).

== Knockout stage ==
=== Quarter-finals ===
18 September 2026 Quarter-final	Na Piarsaigh	3-21 - 2-24; Penalties: 2-3	Carrigtwohill	Páirc Uí Rinn
	K Moynihan 2-0, R O’Sullivan 0-5 (0-3f), D Connery (0-2f) P Guest (0-1f) 0-4 each, D Gunning 1-0, L Sheehan, O Galvin 0-2 each, P Murphy, D Scanlon, P O’Rourke, C Hogan 0-1 each.	Report	J Mulcahy (0-4f), M Barrett (0-3f) 0-5 each, P Walsh 0-4, J Oke 0-3, D Murnane 1-1, D Nolan 1-0, C O’Riordan, J Horgan 0-2 each, P Hogan, T Hogan 0-1 each.

20 September 2026 Quarter-final	Watergrashill	2-31 - 1-29 (aet)	Ballinhassig	Éire Óg Grounds
	S O’Regan 0-11 (0-8 f), S Desmond 1-4, A Murphy 0-6 (0-3 f), B Lehane 1-3, L Foley 0-3, R Loftus, A Spriggs, A Foley, A Cremin 0-1 each.	Report	G Collins 1-16 (0-14 f), S O’Neill 0-3, A O’Sullivan, B Lynch 0-2 each, B Lehane, C Grainger, P O’Regan, R Lombard, S Lombard, M Collins 0-1 each.

=== Semi-finals ===
3 October 2026 Semi-final	Blarney	0-21 - 0-25	Carrigtwohill	SuperValu Páirc Uí Chaoimh
	S Barrett (0-8, 0-6 frees); M Coleman (0-4, 0-2 65s, 0-1 sc); E Kirby, C Hegarty, D McSweeney (0-2 each); C Power, D Hanlon, S Mulcahy (0-1 each).	Report	J Mulcahy (0-7, 0-6 frees); P Walsh (0-6); C O’Riordan (0-5); M Barrett (free), D Nolan (0-3 each); D Murnane (0-1).

3 October 2026 Semi-final	Erin's Own	1-22 - 0-16	Watergrashill	SuperValu Páirc Uí Chaoimh
	C Lenihan 0-7 (0-3f), R O’Flynn 0-4, S Irwin 1-1, F O’Brien 0-3, C Dunphy, C McDonnell 0-2 each, C Dooley, P O’Shea, A O’Sullivan 0-1 each.	Report	S O’Regan 0-7 (0-4f), B Lehane, S Desmond 0-2 each, A Murphy, K O’Neill, D O’Leary, A Foley (0-1f), A Cronin 0-1 each.

=== Final ===
1 November 2026 Final	Carrigtwohill	0-15 - 1-17	Erin's Own	SuperValu Páirc Uí Chaoimh
	J Mulcahy 0-6 (0-4 f), M Barrett 0-5 (0-4 f), J Oke 0-2, J Horgan, C O’Riordan 0-1 each.	Report	Conor Lenihan 0-8 (0-6 f), M O’Riordan 0-5, M O’Carroll 1-0, C Dunphy, O O’Regan (f), P O’Shea, R O’Flynn 0-1 each.	Referee: S Scanlon (Newcestown)

== Championship statistics ==
=== Top scorers ===
Rank	Player	Club	Tally	Total	Matches	Average
1	Conor Lenihan	Erin's Own	2-37	43	5	8.60
2	Fionn Lardner	Fermoy	2-33	39	4	9.75
3	Shane Barrett	Blarney	0-38	38	4	9.50
4	Shane O'Regan	Watergrasshill	0-36	36	5	7.20
4	James Mulcahy	Carrigtwohill	0-36	36	6	6.00
6	Ger Collins	Ballinhassig	1-32	35	4	8.75
7	Patrick Daly	Ballyhea	0-30	30	4	7.50
8	Alan Fenton	Castlelyons	2-22	28	3	9.33
8	Daire Connery	Na Piarsaigh	0-28	28	4	7.00
10	Matthew Barrett	Carrigtwohill	2-21	27	6	4.50
10	Richard Sweetnam	Courcey Rovers	0-27	27	3	9.00
