= 2022 Cork Senior A Hurling Championship =

Annual hurling competition season

- Dates: 30 July - 9 October 2022
- Teams: 12
- Sponsor: Co-Op Superstores
- Champions: Fr. O'Neill's (1st title); Kevin O'Sullivan (captain); Robert Cullinane (captain); Bryan Sweeney (manager); Dave Colbert (manager)
- Runners-up: Courcey Rovers; Tadhg O'Sullivan (captain); Seán Guiheen (manager)
- Relegated: Ballymartle

Tournament statistics
- Matches played: 24
- Goals scored: 64 (2.67 per match)
- Points scored: 880 (36.67 per match)
- Top scorer(s): Declan Dalton (1-50)

The 2022 Cork Senior A Hurling Championship was the third staging of the Cork Senior A Hurling Championship since its establishment by the Cork County Board in 2020. The draw for the group stage placings took place on 8 February 2022. The championship ran from 30 July to 9 October 2022.

The final was played on 9 October 2022 at Páirc Uí Chaoimh in Cork, between Courcey Rovers and Fr. O'Neill's, in what was their first ever meeting in the final. Fr. O'Neill's won the match by 0–20 to 2–12 to claim their first ever championship title in the grade.

Declan Dalton was the championship's top scorer with 1-50.

== Team changes ==
=== To Championship ===
Relegated from the Cork Premier Senior Hurling Championship

- Carrigtwohill

Promoted from the Cork Premier Intermediate Hurling Championship

- Courcey Rovers

=== From Championship ===
Promoted to the Cork Premier Senior Hurling Championship

- Kanturk

Relegated to the Cork Premier Intermediate Hurling Championship

- Bandon

== Participating clubs ==
Team	Location	Colours	Manager(s)	Captain
Ballyhea	Ballyhea	Black and white	John Mortell	Pa O'Callaghan
Ballymartle	Riverstick	Green and yellow		
Blarney	Blarney	Red and white	Mick Barrett	
Bride Rovers	Rathcormac	Green, white and gold	Liam Barry	Patrick O'Flynn
Courcey Rovers	Ballinspittle	Red and white	Seán Guineen	Tadhg O'Sullivan
Carrigtwohill	Carrigtwohill	Blue and yellow		
Cloyne	Cloyne	Red and black	Eoin O'Lomasney	
Fermoy	Fermoy	Black and yellow	Trevor Grumbridge	
Fr. O'Neill's	Ballymacoda	Red and green	Dave Colbert; Bryan Sweeney	Kevin O'Sullivan; Robert Cullinane
Killeagh	Killeagh	Green and white	Brian Barry	
Mallow	Mallow	Red and yellow	Joe Buckley	
Newcestown	Newcestown	Red and yellow	Charlie Wilson	

== Group A ==
=== Group A table ===
Advance to knockout stage Advance to relegation play-off

Team	Matches				Score			Pts
Team	Pld	W	D	L	For	Against	Diff	Pts
Fermoy	3	3	0	0	69	57	12	6
Cloyne	3	1	0	2	71	68	3	2
Mallow	3	1	0	2	69	72	-3	2
Newcestown	3	1	0	2	62	75	-13	2

=== Group A results ===
30 July 2022 Round 1	Cloyne	2-19 - 3-17	Fermoy	Jamesy Kelleher Memorial Park
	B O’Shea 0-10 (0-6 f), B Walsh 0-5, P O’Sullivan 0-2, M Cahill, C Mullins 0-1 each.	Report	B Twomey 1-2, L Coleman 0-5 f, D Lardner 0-4 (0-2 f), P De Roiste 1-1, J Molloy 1-0, A Creed 0-2, S Ahern, D Daly, E Clancy 0-1 each.	Referee: D Daly (Brian Dillons)

30 July 2022 Round 1	Newcestown	1-24 - 3-16	Mallow	Coachford Sportsfield
	E Kenneally 0-11 (0-10 f, (0-1 65), L Meade, D Buckley 0-4 each, J Meade 1-2, S O’Donovan 0-2, N Kelly 0-1.	Report	M Tobin 0-11 (0-8 f), D Sheehan 2-0, F Heffernan 1-1, D Moynihan, P Lyons, P Herlihy, R Mills 0-1 each.	Referee: B Coniry (Crosshaven)

5 August 2022 Round 2	Mallow	3-16 - 2-17	Cloyne	Páirc Mac Gearailt
	D Sheehan 2-1; P Lyons 0-5; D Hayes 1-1; M Tobin 0-4 (0-3 f); P Herlihy 0-2, S Copps, N O’Riordan, P Healy 0-1 each.	Report	B O’Shea 0-11 (0-10 f, 0-1 65), B Walsh 2-1; C Cahill, C Mullins 0-2 each; P O’Sullivan 0-1.	Referee: C Lane (Banteer)

7 August 2022 Round 2	Newcestown	1-16 - 3-12	Fermoy	Ballingcollig Grounds
	E Kenneally 1-10 (0-6 f), L Meade 0-2, J Meade (f), E Collins, C O’Neill, P Collins 0-1 each.	Report	L Coleman 0-8 (0-6 f), S Aherne, T Clancy, G O’Callaghan 1-0 each, J Carr 0-2 (0-1 f), D Daly, and D Lardner 0-1 each.	Referee: B Murphy (Carrigtwohill)

27 August 2022 Round 3	Mallow	1-16 - 0-22	Fermoy	Castletownroche Grounds
	M Tobin 1-5 (0-3 f), P Herlihy 0-5, P Healy, F O’Neill 0-2 each, P Lyons and S Hayes 0-1 each.	Report	L Coleman (f), J Carr 0-4 each, S Aherne, D Daly 0-3 each, P De Róiste (0-2), A Creed, P Murphy, M Brennan, T Clancy, G O’Callaghan and A Aherne (0-1 each).	Referee: M Maher (St. Finbarr's)

27 August 2022 Round 3	Newcestown	0-16 - 1-26	Cloyne	Church Road
	C Dineen 0-4, E Kenneally 0-3 (0-2f), J Meade 0-3, L Meade, J Kelleher, E Collins, R O’Sullivan, S O’Donovan, T Twomey (0-1 each).	Report	B O’Shea 0-15 (0-10 f, 0-1 sl), M Cahill 1-3, C Mullins 0-3, B Walsh 0-2, P O’Sullivan, E Motherway, D Byrne 0-1 each.	Referee: C Lyons (Nemo Rangers)

== Group B ==
=== Group B table ===
Advance to knockout stage Advance to relegation play-off

Team	Matches				Score			Pts
Team	Pld	W	D	L	For	Against	Diff	Pts
Fr. O'Neill's	3	3	0	0	81	55	26	6
Courcey Rovers	3	2	0	1	64	64	0	4
Blarney	3	1	0	2	54	73	-19	2
Killeagh	3	0	0	3	57	64	-7	0

=== Group B results ===
31 July 2022 Round 1	Fr. O'Neill's	3-23 - 0-17	Blarney	Erin's Own Grounds
	D Dalton 1-10 (0-8 f), B Dunne 2-4, K O’Sullivan 0-4, M O’Keeffe 0-2, G Millerick, R Cullinane, J Hankard 0-1 each.	Report	M Coleman 0-5 (0-4 f), P Power 0-3, D McSweeney 0-2, A McEvoy, C Power, P Philpott, P Crowley, S Barrett, C Barrett 0-1 each.	Referee: S Scanlon (Newcestown)

31 July 2022 Round 1	Killeagh	3-11 - 0-22	Courcey Rovers	Ovens Grounds
	E Keniry 2-7 (0-2 f), A Walsh 1-1, A Leahy, S Long, G Leahy 0-1 each.	Report	T O’Sullivan 0-7 (0-4 f, 0-1 65), J O’Neill 0-4, O Crowley 0-3, R Sweetman 0-2, R Nyhan 0-2, S Twomey, M Collins, S Nyhan (f), D J Twomey 0-1 each.	Referee: D Kirwan (Éire Óg)

6 August 2022 Round 2	Killeagh	0-18 - 0-19	Blarney	Erin's Own Grounds
	E Keniry 0-13 f, A Leahy 0-2, S Walsh, D Walsh and R McCarthy 0-1 each.	Report	M Coleman 0-14 (0-11 f, 0-2 65), S Crowley 0-2, M O’Leary, P Power, S Barrett 0-1 each.	Referee: B Coniry (Crosshaven)

7 August 2022 Round 2	Fr. O'Neill's	2-20 - 0-19	Courcey Rovers	Éire Óg Grounds
	D Dalton 0-10 (0-4 f, 0-1 sl, 0-1 65), B Dunne 1-4, P Hassett 1-0, John Millerick 0-2, P McMahon, M O’Keeffe, E Motherway, L O’Driscoll 0-1 each.	Report	T O’Sullivan 0-14 (0-10 f), R Nyhan, L Collins, D J Twomey, R Sweetman, S Twomey 0-1 each.	Referee: D Kirwan (Éire Óg)

27 August 2022 Round 3	Fr. O'Neill's	2-17 - 2-13	Killeagh	Youghal Grounds
	D Dalton 0-12 (0-7 f), B Dunne, J Hankard 1-0 each, M O'Keeffe, P McMahon R Cullinane, T Millerick, E Conway 0-1 each.	Report	E Keniry 0-8 (0-5 f), R McCarthy 1-1 (1-0 pen), C Fitzgibbon 1-0, B Barry, A Leahy, A Walsh, G Leahy, 0-1 each.	Referee: E Coleman (Youghal)

27 August 2022 Round 3	Blarney	0-18 - 2-17	Courcey Rovers	Páirc Uí Rinn
	M Coleman 0-9 f, P Power, S Barrett 0-3 each, D McSweeney 0-2, E Kirby 0-1.	Report	R Sweetnam 0-7 (0-4 f), S Twomey 2-0, S Nyhan 0-4 f, J O’Neill, B Ryan, O Crowley, F Lordan, DJ Twomey, T O’Sullivan (f) 0-1 each.	Referee: P Lyons (Bishopstown)

== Group C ==
=== Group C table ===
Advance to knockout stage Advance to relegation play-off

Team	Matches				Score			Pts
Team	Pld	W	D	L	For	Against	Diff	Pts
Bride Rovers	3	2	1	0	80	56	24	5
Ballyhea	3	1	2	0	63	50	13	4
Carrigtwohill	3	1	1	1	57	69	-12	3
Ballymartle	3	0	0	3	40	65	-25	0

=== Group C results ===
30 July 2022 Round 1	Ballyhea	1-22 - 0-12	Ballymartle	Grenagh Grounds
	P O’Callaghan 1-11 (0-8 f, 0-1 65), E O’Leary 0-7, Jack Morrissey 0-2, John Morrissey, M O’Sullivan 0-1 each.	Report	D McCarthy 0-4 f, B Corry, S Dorney, M Higgins 0-2 each, E Healy (f), E O’Leary 0-1 each.	Referee: P Lyons (Bishopstown)

31 July 2022 Round 1	Carrigtwohill	0-20 - 5-24	Bride Rovers	Clonmult Memorial Park
	S Walsh 0-8, L Gosnell 0-5 (0-4 f), T Hogan 0-3, P O’Sullivan, P Hogan, J McCarthy, J Mulcahy 0-1 each.	Report	B Roche 2-3, C Tobin 2-3 (0-1 f), A Walsh 1-3, P O’Flynn, C O’Connor, D Dooley 0-2 each, C Barry 0-2 f, J Mannix, S O’Connor, W Finnegan, R O’Connell, K Kearney, M Collins, J Ahern 0-1 each.

6 August 2022 Round 2	Carrigtwohill	1-16 - 0-12	Ballymartle	Páirc Uí Rinn
	S Rohan 1-3, L Gosnell 0-6 (0-4 f), S Walsh 0-4, J McCarthy 0-2, J Oke 0-1.	Report	D McCarthy (0-1 f), E Healy (f) 0-3 each, D Desmond, B Corry, L Corry, P Dorney, S Corry, S Cummins 0-1 each.	Referee: M Maher (St. Finbarr's)

7 August 2022 Round 2	Bride Rovers	1-17 - 2-14	Ballyhea	Kildorrery Grounds
	A Walsh 0-7 (0-4 f), C Tobin 1-2, W Finnegan 0-5 f, C O’Connor, K Kearney, P O’Flynn 0-1 each.	Report	P O’Callaghan 2-10 (0-9 f), M O’Sullivan 0-2, D Curtin, J Morrissey 0-1 each.	Referee: N Wall (Carrigaline)

27 August 2022 Round 3	Bride Rovers	0-21 - 1-13	Ballymartle	Riverstown Sportsfield
	A Walsh 0-7 (0-6 f), B Roche 0-6, R O’Connell, C Tobin 0-2 each, P O’Flynn 0-2 f, M Collins 0-1.	Report	D McCarthy 0-8 (0-5 f, 0-1 65, 0-1 sl), K Fitzpatrick 1-1, K O’Callaghan 0-2, B Corry and L O’Callaghan 0-1 each.	Referee: I McCarthy (Bandon)

27 August 2022 Round 3	Carrigtwohill	0-18 - 0-18	Ballyhea	Ballyanley Grounds
	S Walsh 0-6 (0-1 65), L Gosnell 0-4 f, P Hogan 0-3, S Devlin (f), S Rohan 0-2 each, J Mulcahy 0-1.	Report	P O’Callaghan 0-9 (0-6 f), Jack Morrissey, M O’Sullivan 0-2 each, Tiernan Hanley, John Morrissey, D Curtin, E O’Leary, C Hanley 0-1 each.	Referee: A O'Connor (Ballygarvan)

== Knockout stage ==
=== Bracket ===
Quarter-Finals
Bride Rovers (Imokilly)	4-24
Cloyne (Imokilly)	2-11
Ballyhea (Avondhu)	0-16
Courcey Rovers (Carrigdhoun)	0-17

Semi-Finals
Fr. O'Neill's (Imokilly)	1-24
Bride Rovers (Imokilly)	0-16
Fermoy (Avondhu)	0-14
Courcey Rovers (Carrigdhoun)	5-14

Final
Fr. O'Neill's (Imokilly)	0-20
Courcey Rovers (Carrigdhoun)	2-12

=== Relegation playoff ===
10 September 2022 Playoff	Ballymartle	0-13 - 1-16	Killeagh	Church Road
	D McCarthy 0-7 f, P Dorney, K Fitzpatrick, S Dorney, B Corry, J Dwyer, D Desmond 0-1 each.	Report	E Keniry 0-14 (0-8 f, 0-2 65), R McCarthy 1-0, A Walsh, D Kelleher 0-1 each.	Referee: D Copps (Ballyhea)

=== Quarter-finals ===
10 September 2022 Quarter-final	Bride Rovers	4-24 - 2-11	Cloyne	Páirc Uí Chaoimh
	A Walsh 1-5, 5f, B Roche 2-1, C Tobin 1-2, C Ryan 0-4, 1 sideline, W Finnegan and K Kearney 0-3 each, P O’Flynn and R O’Connell 0-2 each, S O’Connor and C Barry 0-1 each.	Report	B O’Shea 0-7, 5f, M Cahill 2-0, B Walsh 0-2, B Minihane and K Dennehy 0-1 each.	Referee: S Scanlon (Newcestown)

10 September 2022 Quarter-final	Ballyhea	0-16 - 0-17	Courcey Rovers	Páirc Uí Chaoimh
	P O’Callaghan 0-8 (0-6 f, 0-1 sl, 0-1 65), M O’Sullivan 0-2, D Curtin, Tom Hanley, D Copps, G Morrissey, E O’Leary, John Morrissey 0-1 each.	Report	R Sweetnam 0-12 (0-11 f, 0-1 65), S Nyhan 0-2 f, B Ryan, S Twomey, O Crowley, 0-1 each.	Referee: I McCarthy (Bandon)

=== Semi-finals ===
23 September 2022 Semi-final	Fermoy	0-14 - 5-14	Courcey Rovers	Páirc Uí Chaoimh
	L Coleman 0-9 (0-7 f, 0-2 65), S Aherne 0-2, J Carr, B Twomey, M Brennan 0-1 each.	Report	S Twomey 4-0, R Nyhan 1-1, R Sweetnam 0-7 (0-3 f), S Nyhan 0-2 f, O Crowley, J O’Neill, T O’Sullivan, B Ryan 0-1 each.	Referee: N Wall (Ballincollig)

24 September 2022 Semi-final	Fr. O'Neill's	1-24 - 0-16	Bride Rovers	Páirc Uí Chaoimh
	D Dalton 0-11 (0-10 f); B Dunne 1-2; T Millerick 0-3; J Hankard 0-2; P McMahon, D Harrington, K O’Sullivan, John Millerick, Joe Millerick E Conway 0-1 each.	Report	W Finnegan 0-4 (0-1 f); P O’Flynn, A Walsh (0-1 65, 0-1 f), S O’Connor 0-2 each; E Roche, K Kearney, D Dooley, R O’Connell, B Roche, C Ryan 0-1 each.	Referee: M Maher (St. Finbarr's)

=== Final ===
9 October 2022 Final	Courcey Rovers	2-12 - 0-20	Fr. O'Neill's	Páirc Uí Chaoimh
	R Sweetnam 0-5 (0-3 f), R Nyhan, S Nyhan (f) 1-1 each, DJ Twomey, O Crowley 0-2 each, C Roche 0-1.	Report	D Dalton 0-7 (0-3 f, 0-1 65), B Dunne 0-4, Joe Millerick, John Millerick 0-3 each, T Millerick 0-2, K O’Sullivan 0-1.	Referee: C O'Regan (Ballyhea)

== Championship statistics ==
=== Top scorers ===
Overall

Rank	Player	Club	Tally	Total	Matches	Average
1	Declan Dalton	Fr. O'Neill's	1-50	53	5	10.60
2	Eoghan Keniry	Killeagh	2-42	48	4	12.00
3	Pa O'Callaghan	Ballyhea	3-38	47	4	11.75
4	Brian O'Shea	Cloyne	0-43	43	4	10.75
5	Richard Sweetnam	Courcey Rovers	0-34	34	6	5.66
6	Adam Walsh	Bride Rovers	2-24	30	5	6.00
7	Billy Dunne	Fr. O'Neill's	5-14	29	5	5.80
8	Mark Coleman	Blarney	0-28	28	3	9.33
9	Edmund Kenneally	Newcestown	1-24	27	3	9.00
10	Brian Roche	Bride Rovers	4-11	23	5	4.60
10	Mark Tobin	Mallow	1-20	23	3	7.66
10	Tadhg O'Sullivan	Courcey Rovers	0-23	23	6	3.83

In a single game

Rank	Player	Club	Tally	Total	Opposition
1	Pa O'Callaghan	Ballyhea	2-10	16	Bride Rovers
2	Brian O'Shea	Cloyne	0-15	15	Newcestown
3	Pa O'Callaghan	Ballyhea	1-11	14	Ballymartle
3	Tadhg O'Sullivan	Courcey Rovers	0-14	14	Fr. O'Neill's
3	Mark Coleman	Blarney	0-14	14	Killeagh
3	Eoghan Keniry	Killeagh	0-14	14	Ballymartle
7	Eoghan Keniry	Killeagh	2-07	13	Courcey Rovers
7	Edmund Kenneally	Newcestown	1-10	13	Fermoy
7	Declan Dalton	Fr. O'Neill's	1-10	13	Blarney
7	Eoghan Keniry	Killeagh	0-13	13	Blarney

=== Miscellaneous ===
- Fr. O'Neill's win their first Senior A title, having lost previous two finals.
