= Cork Senior A Hurling Championship =

- Current season or competition: 2026 Cork Senior A Hurling Championship
- Irish: Craobh Iomána Sinsearach A Chorcaí
- Code: Hurling
- Founded: 2020; 6 years ago
- Region: Cork (GAA)
- Trophy: Jim Forbes Cup
- No. of teams: 12
- Title holders: Erin's Own (1st title)
- Most titles: Multiple teams (1 titles)
- Sponsors: Co-Op Superstores
- Official website: Cork GAA

The Cork Senior A Hurling Championship (known for sponsorship reasons as the Co-Op Superstores Cork Senior A Hurling Championship and abbreviated to the Cork SAHC) is an annual hurling competition organised by the Cork County Board of the Gaelic Athletic Association from 2020 for the lower-ranking senior hurling teams in the county of Cork in Ireland. It is the second tier overall in the entire Cork hurling championship system.

In its current format, the Cork Senior A Championship begins in early autumn. The 12 participating club teams are drawn into three groups of four teams and play each other in a round-robin system. The three group winners and the three runners-up proceed to the knockout phase that culminates with the final match at Páirc Uí Chaoimh. The winning team is presented with the Jim Forbes Cup.

Erin's Own are the reigning champions, having beaten Carrigtwohill by 1–17 to 0–15 in the 2026 final.

== History ==
=== Development ===
On 26 March 2019, three championship proposals were circulated to Cork club delegates after an expensive review process of the entire Cork championship system. A core element running through all three proposals, put together by the Cork GAA games workgroup, was that there be a group stage of 12 teams, as well as straight relegation and promotion. On 2 April 2019, a majority of 136 club delegates voted for Option A which provided for one round of games played in April and two more in August – all with inter-county players available. The decision meant that, for the first time since 1887, the top tier of Cork football was going to be split in two into the Cork Premier Senior Championship and the Cork Senior A Championship.

=== Beginnings ===
The inaugural championship was scheduled to begin in April 2020, however, it was postponed indefinitely due to the coronavirus pandemic in Ireland. When the championship resumed, time constraints led to a revision of the format, with the play-offs for the second best and third best third placed teams being abolished. The knockout stage was further reduced, with the two best-ranking teams from the group stage receiving byes to the semi-finals and the other four qualifying teams contesting two lone quarter-finals. The very first match eventually took place on 31 July 2020, with Fr. O'Neill's claiming a 3–16 to 0–18 victory over Kilworth. Declan Dalton scored the very first championship point before Billy Dunne scored the championship's first ever goal. Kilworth became the first team to be relegated when they lost the 2020 relegation playoff to Killeagh.

== Regular format ==
=== Group stage ===
The 12 teams are divided into three groups of four. Over the course of the group stage, which features one game in April and two games in August, each team plays once against the others in the group, resulting in each team being guaranteed at least three games. Two points are awarded for a win, one for a draw and zero for a loss. The teams are ranked in the group stage table by points gained, then scoring difference and then their head-to-head record. The top two teams in each group qualify for the knock-out stage.

=== Knockout stage ===
Following the completion of the group stage, the top two teams from each group are ranked (1-6) in terms of points accumulated and scoring difference. The two top-ranking teams receive byes to separate semi-finals.

- Quarter-finals: Teams designated 3-6 contest this round. The two winners from these two games advance to the semi-finals.
- Semi-finals: The two quarter-final winners and teams designated 1-2 contest this round. The two winners from these two games advance to the final.
- Final: The two semi-final winners contest the final. The winning team are declared champions.

=== Promotion and relegation ===
At the end of the championship, the winning team is automatically promoted to the Cork Premier Senior Championship for the following season. The three bottom-placed teams from the group stage take part in a series of play-offs, with the losing team being relegated to the Cork Premier Intermediate Championship.

== Teams ==
=== 2027 Teams ===
The 12 teams due to compete in the 2027 Cork Senior A Hurling Championship were:

Team	Location	Division	Colours	Position in 2026	In championship since	Championship titles (PSHC)	Last championship title (PSHC)
Ballincollig	Ballincollig	Muskerry	Green and white	Premier Intermediate champions	2027	0	—
Ballinhassig	Ballinhassig	Carrigdhoun	Blue and white	Quarter-finals	2026	0	—
Ballyhea	Ballyhea	Avondhu	Black and white	Relegation playoff winners	2021	1	1896
Blarney	Blarney	Muskerry	Red and white	Semi-finals	2021	0	—
Carrigtwohill	Carrigtwohill	Imokilly	Blue and gold	Runners-up	2022	2	2011
Castlelyons	Castlelyons	Imokilly	Green and gold	Group stage	2024	0	—
Courcey Rovers	Ballinspittle, Ballinadee	Carrigdhoun	Red and white	Group stage	2022	0	—
Douglas	Douglas	Seandún	Green, black and white	Premier Senior relegated	2027	0	—
Inniscarra	Inniscarra	Muskerry	Blue and white	Group stage	2023	0	—
Killeagh	Killeagh	Imokilly	Green and white	Group stage	2020	0	—
Na Piarsaigh	Fair Hill	Seandún	Black and amber	Quarter-finals	2023	3	2004
Watergrasshill	Watergrasshill	Imokilly	Red and white	Semi-finals	2025	0	—

== Sponsorship ==
Co-Op Superstores were unveiled as the title sponsor for all of Cork GAA's hurling championships in July 2020.

== Venues ==
=== Group stage ===
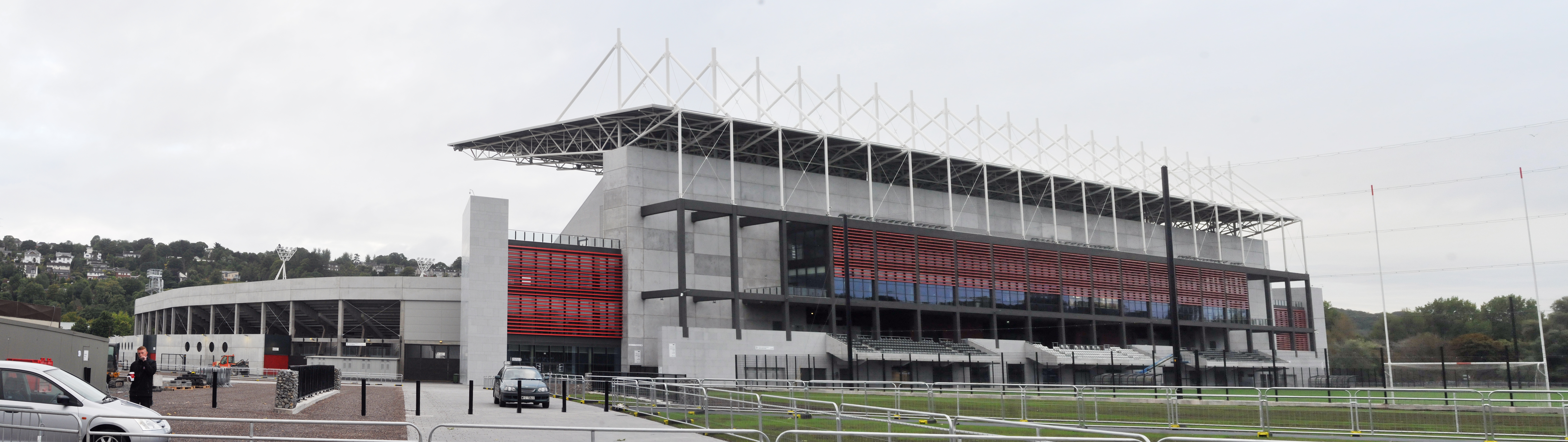
The inaugural final was played at Páirc Uí Chaoimh in 2020.

Fixtures in the group stage of the championship are usually played at a neutral venue that is deemed halfway between the participating teams. Some of the more common venues include Mallow GAA Complex, Páirc Uí Chonaill, Ballincollig Sportsfield and Coachford Pitch.

=== Final ===
The inaugural final in 2020 was played at Páirc Uí Chaoimh.

== Managers ==
Managers in the Cork Senior A Championship are involved in the day-to-day running of the team, including the training, team selection, and sourcing of players. Their influence varies from club-to-club and is related to the individual club committees. The manager is assisted by a team of two or three selectors and a backroom team consisting of various coaches.

Winning managers
Manager(s)	Team	Wins	Winning years
Claude Gough	Charleville	1	2020
Tom Walsh	Kanturk	1	2021
Dave Colbert; Bryan Sweeney	Fr O'Neill's	1	2022
Charlie Wilson	Newcestown	1	2023
Tomás Mulcahy	Glen Rovers	1	2024
Brian Murphy	Bride Rovers	1	2025

== Trophy and medals ==
The Jim Forbes Cup is the current prize for winning the championship. It was commissioned to honour Jim Forbes who served in a number of administrative roles with the Cork County Board, including as chairman from 2003 to 2005. The cup was presented to the County Board by the Carrigdhoun division shortly before the 2020 final.

In accordance with GAA rules, the County Board awards a set of gold medals to the championship winners. The medals depict a stylised version of the Cork GAA crest.

== List of Finals ==
=== List of Cork SAHC finals ===
Year	Winners		Runners-up		Winning Captain(s)	Venue	#
Year	Club	Score	Club	Score	Winning Captain(s)	Venue	#
2026	Erin's Own	1-17	Carrigtwohill	0-15	Cormac Dooley	SuperValu Páirc Uí Chaoimh	
2025	Bride Rovers	2-15	Castlelyons	2-14	Conlaith Ryan & Cian Hogan	SuperValu Páirc Uí Chaoimh	
2024	Glen Rovers	3–17	Blarney	1–16	Dean Brosnan	SuperValu Páirc Uí Chaoimh	
2023	Newcestown	3–17	Blarney	0–24	Eoghan Collins	Páirc Uí Chaoimh	
2022	Fr. O'Neill's	0–20	Courcey Rovers	2–12	Kevin O'Sullivan; Robert Cullinane	Páirc Uí Chaoimh	
2021	Kanturk	3–17	Fr. O'Neill's	2–13	Darren Browne	Páirc Uí Chaoimh	
2020	Charleville	1–23	Fr. O'Neill's	4–13	Alan Dennehy	Páirc Uí Chaoimh	

=== Notes ===
- 2023: The first match ended in a draw: Newcestown 0–19 — 1–16 Blarney.
- 2025: The first match ended in a draw: Bride Rovers 0–14 — 0–14 Castlelyons.

== Roll of honour ==
=== By club ===
#	Club	Titles	Runners-up	Winning years	Losing years
1	Fr. O'Neill's	1	2	2022	2020, 2021
1	Charleville	1	0	2020	—
1	Kanturk	1	0	2021	—
1	Newcestown	1	0	2023	—
1	Glen Rovers	1	0	2024	—
1	Bride Rovers	1	0	2025	—
1	Erin's Own	1	0	2026	—
8	Blarney	0	2	—	2023, 2024
8	Courcey Rovers	0	1	—	2022
8	Castlelyons	0	1	—	2025
8	Carrigtwohill	0	1	—	2026

=== By division ===
Division	Titles	Runners-up	Total
Imokilly	3	4	7
Avondhu	1	0	1
Carbery	1	0	1
Duhallow	1	0	1
Seandun	1	0	1
Muskerry	0	2	2
Carrigdhoun	0	1	1

== Records and statistics ==
=== Seasons in championship ===
The number of years that each club has played in the Senior A Championship between 2020 and 2026. A total of 24 clubs have competed in at least one season of the championship. 2 clubs have participated in the most seasons. The clubs in bold will participate in the 2026 Cork Senior A Hurling Championship.

Years	Clubs
7	**Fermoy**, **Killeagh**
6	**Ballyhea**, **Blarney**, Bride Rovers
5	**Carrigtwohill**, Cloyne, **Courcey Rovers**
4	**Inniscarra**, Mallow, **Na Piarsaigh**, Newcestown
3	Ballymartle, **Castlelyons**, Fr. O'Neill's
2	Bandon, Kanturk, **Watergrasshill**,
1	**Ballinhassig**, Bishopstown, Charleville, **Erins Own**, Glen Rovers, Kilworth

=== Top scorers ===
==== All time ====
As of match played 1 November 2026

#	Player	Club	Score	Total
1	Shane Barrett	Blarney	2-175	181
2	Richard Sweetnam	Courcey Rovers	0-152	152
3	Mark Coleman	Blarney	5-136	151
4	Declan Dalton	Fr O'Neill's	11-115	148
5	Pa O'Callaghan	Ballyhea	6-122	140
6	Adam Walsh	Bride Rovers	4-116	128
7	Alan Fenton	Castlelyons	6-106	124
8	Seán Walsh	Carrigtwohill	9-96	123
9	Eoghan Keniry	Killeagh	4-101	113
10	Brian O'Shea	Cloyne	3-93	102

==== By year ====
Year	Top scorer	Team	Score	Total
2020	Darragh Fitzgibbon	Charleville	2-51	57
2021	Mark Coleman	Blarney	1-38	41
2022	Declan Dalton	Fr. O'Neill's	1-50	53
2023	Shane Barrett	Blarney	**1-69**	**72**
2024	Alan Fenton	Castlelyons	2-46	52
2025	Adam Walsh	Bride Rovers	2-42	48
2026	Conor Lenihan	Erin's Own	2-37	43

==== In a single game ====
Year	Top scorer	Team	Score	Total
2020	Eoghan Keniry	Killeagh	1-12	15
2021	Declan Dalton	Fr. O'Neill's	1-14	17
2022	Pa O'Callaghan	Ballyhea	2-10	16
2023	Pa O'Callaghan	Ballyhea	1-14	17
2024	Patrick Horgan	Glen Rovers	2-09	15
2025	Anthony Spillane	Castlelyons	4-04	16
2026	Ger Collins	Ballinhassig	**1-16**	**19**

==== In finals ====
Year	Top scorer	Team	Score	Total
2020	Darragh Fitzgibbon	Charleville	1-08	11
2021	Colin Walsh	Kanturk	3-01	10
2022	Declan Dalton	Fr. O'Neill's	0-07	7
2023	Eddie Kenneally	Newcestown	1-06	9
2023	Shane Barrett	Blarney	0-09	9
2024	Patrick Horgan	Glen Rovers	2-06	12
2025	Alan Fenton	Castlelyons	0-08	8
2025	Adam Walsh	Bride Rovers	1-07	10
2026	Conor Lenihan	Erin's Own	0-08	8

== See also ==
- Cork Premier Senior Hurling Championship
