= Darragh Fitzgibbon =

Irish hurler (born 1997)

Personal information
- Native name: Darragh Mac Giobúin (Irish)
- Nickname: Fitzy
- Born: 1 April 1997 (age 29) Charleville, County Cork, Ireland
- Occupation: Primary school teacher
- Height: 6 ft 2 in (188 cm)

Sport
- Sport: Hurling
- Position: Midfield
Clubs*
Years	Club	Apps (scores)
2014-present 2016 2017-2018	Charleville → Avondhu → UCC	43 (8-294); 1 (0-00); 7 (1-25)
Club titles
- Cork titles: 0
College
- Years: College
- University College Cork
College titles
- Fitzgibbon titles: 2
Inter-county**
Years	County	Apps (scores)
2017-present	Cork	52 (4-109)
Inter-county titles
- Munster titles: 3
- All-Irelands: 0
- NHL: 1
- All Stars: 3
- * club appearances and scores correct as of 21:33, 8 June 2025. **Inter County team apps and scores correct as of 23:56, 5 July 2026.

Darragh Fitzgibbon (born 1 April 1997) is an Irish hurler. At club level he plays with Charleville and at inter-county level he is the captain of the Cork senior hurling team. Fitzgibbon usually lines out at midfield.

== Early life ==
Fitzgibbon received his secondary education at Charleville CBS. He played hurling in all different age-groups with the school, including lining out in the Dr Harty Cup. Fitzgibbon later studied at University College Cork (UCC) and earned selection to the university's hurling team. He won a Fitzgibbon Cup medal in 2019, after scoring a point in the 2–21 to 0–13 win over Mary Immaculate College in the final. Fitzgibbon claimed a second successive winners' medal in 2020, after a one-point win over Institute of Technology, Carlow. He ended the campaign by being named on the Team of the Year.

== Club career ==
Fitzgibbon first played hurling, and Gaelic football, at underage levels with the Charleville club. He won consecutive North Cork U21AHC titles and was at midfield when the club's under-21 football team beat Duarigle Gaels to win the Cork U21BFC title in 2018.

By that stage, Fitzgibbon had already made his adult level debut, after lining out in a six-point win over Milford in the Cork IHC in June 2014. Charleville later incurred a one-point defeat by Fermoy in the final. Charleville qualified for a second successive final a year later, with Fitzgibbon claiming a winners' medal after scoring 1–09 in the 5–24 to 1–10 win over Dripsey.

Three years later, Fitzgibbon was Charleville's top scorer overall when the club beat Courcey Rovers in a replay to win the Cork PIHC title. This was followed by a Munster Club IHC title, before defeat for Charleville by Oranmore-Maree in the 2019 All-Ireland Club IHC final.

Fitzgibbon was the championship's top scorer with 2–51, when Charleville won the inaugural Cork SAHC title in 2020, after a 3–12 to 1–14 win over Fr O'Neill's in the final. As a Gaelic footballer, Fitzgibbon won a North Cork JAFC medal after Charleville's 0–18 to 0–13 win over Liscarroll/Churchtown Gaels in 2025.

== Inter-county career ==
Fitzgibbon first played for Cork as a member of the minor team during their unsuccessful Munster MHC campaign in 2015. He immediately made the step up the under-21 team, making his first appearance for the team in a seven-point defeat by Limerick in June 2016. After another unsuccessful campaign the following year, Fitzgibbon won a Munster U21HC medal in July 2018, in spite of leaving the field injured in Cork's 2–23 to 1–13 defeat of Tipperary in the final. Cork were later beaten by Tipperary in the 2018 All-Ireland U21HC final, in what was his last game in the grade. Fitzgibbon was later nominated for the Team of the Year.

After being earlier added to the pre-season training panel, Fitzgibbon made his senior team debut in a National Hurling League defeat of Clare in February 2017. His first Munster SHC start came in a 2–27 to 1–26 win over Tipperary in May 2017. Fitzgibbon subsequently claimed his first provincial medal, after lining ot at midfield in Cork's 1–25 to 1–20 defeat of Clare in the 2017 Munster SHC final. He ended the season by receiving his first All-Star nomination.

Fitzgibbon won a second consecutive Munster SHC medal in July 2018, following a second consecutive 2–24 to 3–19 defeat of Clare in the final. His performances throughout the season earned him his first All-Star award and a Young Hurler of the Year nomination. Fitzgibbon lined out at midfield in Cork's 3–32 to 1–22 defeat by Limerick in the 2021 All-Ireland SHC final. He received further All-Star nominations in 2022 and 2023.

Fitzgibbon lined out at midfield in Cork's 3–28 to 1-34 extra-time defeat by Clare in the 2024 All-Ireland SHC final. He ended the season by winning his second All-Star award, as well as being a GAA/GPA Hurler of the Year nominee. Fitzgibbon claimed his first national silverware in April 2025 when Cork won the National Hurling League title following a 3–24 to 0–23 win over Tipperary in the final. Later that season, he won his third Munster SHC medal after a penalty shootout defeat of Limerick in the 2025 Munster SHC final. Fitzgibbon was again at midfield for the 3–27 to 1–18 defeat by Tipperary in the 2025 All-Ireland SHC final, in what was a second consecutive defeat in the final and a third defeat in five seasons. He ended the season, once again, by claiming a third All-Star award.

Fitzgibbon succeeded Robert Downey as team captain in January 2026.

== Personal life ==
Fitzgibbon's father is former Milford and Cork hurler Mossy Fitzgibbon, and his mother is Ita O’Keeffe, who played camogie with Castletown-Ballyagran, in Limerick. . He is the maternal cousin of Richie English, a four time All Ireland winner with Limerick.

== Career statistics ==
=== Club ===
As of 20 September 2026.

Team	Year	Cork IHC		Munster		All-Ireland		Total	
Team	Year	Apps	Score	Apps	Score	Apps	Score	Apps	Score
Charleville	2014	2	0-03	—		—		2	0-03
Charleville	2015	4	1-24	—		—		4	1-24
Charleville	Total	6	1-27	—		—		6	1-27
Charleville	Year	Cork PIHC		Munster		All-Ireland		Total	
Charleville	Year	Apps	Score	Apps	Score	Apps	Score	Apps	Score
Charleville	2016	3	1-15	—		—		3	1-15
Charleville	2017	4	0-24	—		—		4	0-24
Charleville	2018	6	2-27	2	0-15	2	0-16	10	2-58
Charleville	Total	13	3-66	2	0-15	2	0-16	17	3-97
Charleville	Year	Cork SHC		Munster		All-Ireland		Total	
Charleville	Year	Apps	Score	Apps	Score	Apps	Score	Apps	Score
Charleville	2019	2	0-30	—		—		2	0-30
Charleville	Total	2	0-30	—		—		2	0-30
Charleville	Year	Cork SAHC		Munster		All-Ireland		Total	
Charleville	Year	Apps	Score	Apps	Score	Apps	Score	Apps	Score
Charleville	2020	5	2-51	—		—		5	2-51
Charleville	Total	5	2-51	—		—		5	2-51
Charleville	Year	Cork PSHC		Munster		All-Ireland		Total	
Charleville	Year	Apps	Score	Apps	Score	Apps	Score	Apps	Score
Charleville	2021	4	2-35	—		—		4	2-35
Charleville	2022	4	0-25	—		—		4	0-25
Charleville	2023	1	0-05	—		—		1	0-05
Charleville	2024	4	0-24	—		—		4	0-24
Charleville	2025	4	0-35	—		—		4	0-35
Charleville	2026	3	0-23	—		—		3	0-23
Charleville	Total	20	2-147	—		—		20	2-147
Career total		46	8-321	2	0-15	2	0-16	50	8-352

=== Division ===
As of match played 1 September 2018.

Team	Year	Cork SHC	
Team	Year	Apps	Score
Avondhu	2016	1	0-00
University College Cork	2017	5	0-16
University College Cork	2018	2	1-09
Career total		8	1-25

=== Inter-county ===
As of 4 July 2026

Team	Year	National League			Munster		All-Ireland		Total	
Team	Year	Division	Apps	Score	Apps	Score	Apps	Score	Apps	Score
Cork	2017	Division 1A	4	0-06	3	0-02	1	0-01	8	0-09
Cork	2018	Division 1A	4	0-05	5	0-10	1	0-04	10	0-19
Cork	2019	Division 1A	1	0-00	4	0-06	2	0-04	7	0-10
Cork	2020	Division 1A	4	0-05	0	0-00	1	0-00	5	0-05
Cork	2021	Division 1A	4	0-10	1	0-03	4	0-03	9	0-16
Cork	2022	Division 1A	6	2-13	4	2-03	2	1-06	12	5-22
Cork	2023	Division 1A	0	0-00	4	1-11	—		4	1-11
Cork	2024	Division 1A	2	1-01	4	0-14	4	0-10	10	1-25
Cork	2025	Division 1A	7	2-31	5	0-11	2	0-05	14	2-47
Cork	2026	Division 1A	7	2-18	3	0-12	2	0-04	12	2-34
Career total			39	7-89	33	3-72	19	1-37	91	11-198

== Honours ==
University College Cork

- Fitzgibbon Cup (2): 2019, 2020

Charleville

- Cork Senior A Hurling Championship (1): 2020
- Munster Intermediate Club Hurling Championship (1): 2018
- Cork Premier Intermediate Hurling Championship (1): 2018
- Cork Intermediate Hurling Championship (1): 2015
- North Cork Junior A Football Championship (1): 2025
- Cork Under-21 B Football Championship (1) 2018
- North Cork Under-21 Hurling Championship (2) 2016, 2017

Cork

- Munster Senior Hurling Championship (3): 2017, 2018, 2025
- National Hurling League (1): 2025
- Munster Under-21 Hurling Championship (1): 2018

Awards

- GAA GPA All Stars Awards (3): 2018, 2024, 2025
- The Sunday Game Team of the Year (3): 2018, 2024, 2025

Sporting positions
Preceded by Robert Downey	Cork senior hurling team captain 2026	Succeeded by Incumbent
