= 2023 Cork Senior A Hurling Championship =

Annual hurling competition season

- Dates: 4 August - 28 October 2023
- Teams: 12
- Sponsor: Co-Op Superstores
- Champions: Newcestown (1st title); Eoghan Collins (captain); Charlie Wilson (manager)
- Runners-up: Blarney; Conor Power (captain); Michael Barrett (manager)
- Relegated: Mallow

Tournament statistics
- Matches played: 25
- Goals scored: 68 (2.72 per match)
- Points scored: 813 (32.52 per match)
- Top scorer(s): Shane Barrett (1-69)

The 2023 Cork Senior A Hurling Championship was the fourth staging of the Cork Senior A Hurling Championship since its establishment by the Cork County Board in 2020. The draw for the group stage placings took place on 11 December 2022. The championship ran from 4 August to 28 October 2023.

The final, a replay, was played on 28 October 2023 at Páirc Uí Chaoimh in Cork, between Blarney and Newcestown, in what was their first ever meeting in the final. Newcestown won the match by 3–17 to 0–24 to claim their first ever championship title in the grade.

Blarney's Shane Barrett was the championship's top scorer with 1-69.

== Team changes ==
=== To Championship ===
Relegated from the Cork Premier Senior Hurling Championship

- Na Piarsaigh

Promoted from the Cork Premier Intermediate Hurling Championship

- Inniscarra

=== From Championship ===
Promoted to the Cork Premier Senior Hurling Championship

- Fr. O'Neill's

Relegated to the Cork Premier Intermediate Hurling Championship

- Ballymartle

== Group A ==
=== Group A table ===
Knockout stage Relegation playoff

Team	Matches				Score			Pts
Team	Pld	W	D	L	For	Against	Diff	Pts
Bride Rovers	3	3	0	0	58	43	15	6
Killeagh	3	1	1	1	65	59	6	3
Na Piarsaigh	3	1	1	1	60	56	4	3
Inniscarra	3	0	0	3	49	74	-25	0

=== Group A results ===
4 August 2023 Round 1	Killeagh	4-13 - 1-14	Inniscarra	Caherlag Grounds
	D McCarthy 0-7 (0-5 f), G Leahy 2-1, D Walsh, C Leahy 1-1 each, C Fitzgibbon, S Smiddy, E Keniry 0-1 each.	Report	P Holland 0-7 (0-5 f), S O’Donoghue 1-2, O McCarthy, K Rice (f) 0-2 each, C Casey 0-1.	Referee: P O'Mahony (Kilbrittain)

4 August 2023 Round 1	Na Piarsaigh	0-10 - 1-14	Bride Rovers	Riverstown Sportsfield
	C Hanifin 0-5 f, R O’Sullivan 0-2 (0-1 f), K Buckley, D Connery (f), P Rourke 0-1 each.	Report	W Finnegan 0-7 f, D Dooley 1-1, R O’Connell, B Roche 0-2 each, C Ryan, C Tobin 0-1 each.	Referee: D Copps (Ballyhea)

12 August 2023 Round 2	Bride Rovers	1-17 - 1-15	Killeagh	Clonmult Memorial Park
	A Walsh (0-10, 0-8 frees, 0-1 ’65), C Ryan (1-0), B Roche (0-2), S O’Connor, C Tobin, W Finnegan, D Dooley and L Roche (0-1 each).	Report	D McCarthy (0-10, frees), C Leahy (1-2), E Keniry and S Long (0-1 each).	Referee: W Wallis (Aghada)

12 August 2023 Round 2	Inniscarra	2-11 - 1-25	Na Piarsaigh	Ballincollig Grounds
	P Holland 2-2 (2f); A McCarthy 0-4, S O’Donoghue 0-2; K Rice, S Sheehan, O McCarthy all 0-1.	Report	E Moynihan 0-10 (7f); R O’Sullivan 0-8 (3f), S Forde 1-2, D Connery (1f), G Joyce, P Lehane, C Flynn, P O’Rourke all 0-1.	Referee: I McCarthy (Bandon)

2 September 2023 Round 3	Bride Rovers	1-18 - 1-12	Inniscarra	Riverstown Sportsfield
	A Walsh 0-9 (0-7 f, 0-2 65), J Ahern 1-1, C Ryan (0-1 sl), R O’Connell 0-3 each, B Roche 0-2.	Report	P Holland 1-7 (1-4 f, 0-3 65), O McCarthy (0-1 f), D O’Keeffe 0-2 each, S O’Donoghue 0-1.	Referee: D Daly (Brian Dillons)

2 September 2023 Round 3	Na Piarsaigh	1-19 - 1-19	Killeagh	Páirc Uí Chonaill
	E Moynihan 0-8 (0-7 f), K Moynihan, R O’Sullivan (1 f) 0-3 each, S Forde 1-0, P Rourke (1 f) L Sheehan 0-2 each, E Sheehan 0-1.	Report	D McCarthy 0-10 (0-7 f 0-1 65), E Keniry 0-3, P O’Brien 1-0, G Leahy, S Walsh 0-2 each, C Leahy R McCarthy (sideline) 0-1 each.	Referee: C O'Regan (Ballyhea)

== Group B ==
=== Group B table ===
Knockout stage

Team	Matches				Score			Pts
Team	Pld	W	D	L	For	Against	Diff	Pts
Newcestown	3	2	0	1	69	59	10	4
Blarney	3	2	0	1	74	70	4	4
Ballyhea	3	1	0	2	63	71	-8	2
Courcey Rovers	3	1	0	2	62	68	-6	2

=== Group B results ===
5 August 2023 Round 1	Courcey Rovers	1-15 - 1-20	Ballyhea	Mallow GAA Complex
	R Sweetnam 0-8 (0-7 f, 0-1 65); D O’Donovan 1-0; S Twomey 0-2; R O’Callaghan, S Nyhan (f), F Lordan, L Collins, DJ Twomey 0-1 each.	Report	P O’Callaghan 1-9 (0-5 f); E O’Leary 0-6; J Hickey 0-2; C Cox, J Morrissey, T Hanley 0-1 each.	Referee: W King (Banteer)

5 August 2023 Round 1	Newcestown	2-18 - 0-21	Blarney	Ovens Grounds
	E Kenneally 1-10 (0-4 f), R O’Sullivan 1-4, C Dineen, J Meade, P Collins, D Buckley 0-1 each.	Report	S Barrett 0-11 (0-7 f), D McSweeney, P Power, C Barrett 0-2 each, O Hegarty, C Power, S Mulcahy 0-1 each.	Referee: N O'Neill (Midleton)

12 August 2023 Round 2	Blarney	2-18 - 2-16	Courcey Rovers	Éire Óg Grounds
	S Barrett 0-12 (0-6 f, 0-1 65), P Power 1-3, A McEvoy 1-0 pen, C Barrett 0-2, C Power 0-1.	Report	R Sweetnam 0-9 f, C Roche, D O’Donovan 1-0 each, S Twomey 0-4, J McCarthy, R O’Callaghan, F Lordan 0-1 each.	Referee: C McAllister (Aghada)

12 August 2023 Round 2	Ballyhea	1-13 - 2-18	Newcestown	Mourneabbey Grounds
	P O’Callaghan 0-8 (0-7 frees, 0-1 ‘65), T Hanley 1-1, M O'Sullivan 0-2 (0-1 free), J Morrissey and L Crowley 0-1 each.	Report	R O ‘Sullivan 1-4, E Kenneally 0-6 (0-3 frees), S O’Donovan 1-1, N Kelly and C Dineen 0-2 each, P Collins, J Meade and D Buckley 0-1 each.	Referee: D Daly (Brian Dillons)

2 September 2023 Round 3	Ballyhea	2-18 - 2-23	Blarney	Mourneabbey Grounds
	P O’Callaghan 1-14 (1-0 pen, 0-10 f, 0-1 65); E O’Leary 1-0; J Hickey, G Morrissey, M O’Sullivan, T Hanley 0-1 each.	Report	S Barrett 0-14 (0-11 f), E Kirby 2-0; C Barrett, M Coleman, S Mulcahy, C Hegarty 0-2 each; D McSweeney 0-1.	Referee: W Wallace (Midleton)

2 September 2023 Round 3	Courcey Rovers	1-19 - 2-15	Newcestown	Brinny Sportsfield
	R Sweetnam 0-10 (0-7 f), S Nyhan 0-4 f, O Crowley 1-1, L Collins, C Roche, M O’Donovan, R O’Callaghan 0-1 each.	Report	E Kenneally 1-10 (0-10 f), S O’Donovan 1-1, C Dineen 0-2, R O’Sullivan, J Meade 0-1 each.	Referee: B Barry-Murphy (Aghabullogue)

== Group C ==
=== Group C table ===
Knockout stage Relegation playoff

Team	Matches				Score			Pts
Team	Pld	W	D	L	For	Against	Diff	Pts
Carrigtwohill	3	2	0	1	65	50	15	4
Cloyne	3	2	0	1	60	59	1	4
Fermoy	3	2	0	1	56	57	-1	4
Mallow	3	0	0	3	54	69	-15	0

=== Group C results ===
5 August 2023 Round 1	Fermoy	1-14 - 1-18	Cloyne	Youghal Grounds
	J Carr (0-8, 0-6 frees), S Aherne (1-1), D Lardner, D Daly, B O’Sullivan, S Coughlan (free) and G O’Callaghan (0-1 each).	Report	B O’Shea (0-7, 0-3 frees, 0-2 ’65), N Cahill (0-4), M Cahill (1-0), C Cahill (0-3), D Byrne (0-2), J Hallihan and K Dennehy (0-1 each).	Referee: C Lane (Banteer)

6 August 2023 Round 1	Carrigtwohill	2-20 - 2-09	Mallow	Church Road
	S Walsh 1-9 (0-5f), L Gosnell 1-1, P Hogan 0-3, C O’Riordan, L O’Sullivan 0-2 each, J Mulcahy, D Murnane, C Barry 0-1 each.	Report	S Hayes 2-1 (1-0 penalty, 1-0f), M Tobin 0-7f, R Sheehan 0-1.	Referee: P Lyons (Bishopstown)

12 August 2023 Round 2	Mallow	1-13 - 0-18	Fermoy	Castletownroche Grounds
	S Hayes 0-6 (5f, 1 ’65), D Hayes 1-0, R Sheehan and M Tobin 0-2 each, P Lyons, F O’Neill and R Mills 0-1 each.	Report	B O’Sullivan 0-6 (4f), P De Róiste, M Brennan, D O’Callaghan, S Aherne, and J Carr 0-2 each, D Daly and J Molloy 0-1 each.	Referee: A Hyland (Kilworth)

12 August 2023 Round 2	Cloyne	1-11 - 0-19	Carrigtwohill	Killeagh Grounds
	B O’Shea 1-6 (0-6 f 1-0 pen), N Cahill 0-2, B Walsh, J Hallihan, M Cahill 0-1 each.	Report	S Walsh 0-8 (0-5 f), J Mulcahy 0-4, L Gosnell 0-3 (0-2 f), D Murnane, B Twomey, C O’Riordan, T Hogan 0-1 each.	Referee: N O'Neill (Midleton)

2 September 2023 Round 3	Cloyne	2-19 - 2-17	Mallow	Grenagh Grounds
	B O’Shea (frees) and C Cahill (0-5 each), M Cahill (0-1 free) and K Dennehy (1-1 each), B Walsh, J Hallihan and E Motherway (0-2 each), N Cahill (0-1).	Report	M Tobin (1-9, 0-5 frees), P Lyons and D Sheehan (0-3 each), D Hayes (1-0), D Moynihan and P Healy (0-1 each).	Referee: A O'Connor (Ballygarvan)

2 September 2023 Round 3	Fermoy	1-18 - 2-14	Carrigtwohill	Felix Sarsfield Memorial Park
	B O’Sullivan 0-10 (0-8 f), D O’Callaghan 1-1, D Daly 0-3, S Aherne 0-2, P de Roiste, J Carr 0-1 each.	Report	S Walsh 0-5 (0-2 f), J Mulcahy 1-1, S Devlin 1-0, C O’Riordan 0-3, J Oke, D Murnane, J McCarthy, P Hogan, S De Búrca 0-1 each.	Referee: M Maher (St Finbarr's)

== Knockout stage ==
=== Bracket ===
Quarter-Finals
Blarney	0-24
Cloyne	2-09
Newcestown	1-19
Killeagh	2-10

Semi-Finals
Bride Rovers	1-12
Blarney	3-15
Carrigtwohill	1-14
Newcestown	2-14

Final
Blarney	1-16, 0-24
Newcestown	0-19, 3-17

=== Relegation playoff ===
17 September 2023 Playoff	Mallow	1-13 - 3-16	Inniscarra	Blarney Grounds
	M Tobin 0-9 (0-8 f), R Mills 1-0, S Leneghan 0-2 (0-1 f), Daniel Sheehan, M Kelleher 0-1 each.	Report	P Holland 1-5 (0-3 f), C Casey 1-4, D O’Keeffe 1-1, S O’Donoghue 0-3, C O’Leary, M Nagle, S O’Mahony 0-1 each.	Referee: C Lyons (Nemo Rangers)

=== Quarter-finals ===
15 September 2023 Quarter-final	Blarney	0-24 - 2-09	Cloyne	Páirc Uí Chaoimh
	S Barrett 0-11 (0-10f), M Coleman, E Kirby, S Mulcahy, D McSweeney, C Barrett 0-2 each, C Power, C Hegarty, P Power 0-1 each.	Report	B O’Shea 0-8 (0-6f, 0-1 65), J Hallihan 1-1, B Walsh 1-0.	Referee: S Stokes (Tullylease)

16 September 2023 Quarter-final	Newcestown	1-19 - 2-10	Killeagh	Páirc Uí Chaoimh
	E Kenneally 1-8 (0-6f, 0-1 65), J Meade 0-3, C Dinneen, R O’Sullivan, N Kelly, D Buckley 0-2 each.	Report	D McCarthy 0-7 (0-5f), G Leahy 1-1, S Long 1-0, S Walsh, E Keniry 0-1 each.	Referee: W King (Banteer)

=== Semi-finals ===
30 September 2023 Semi-final	Carrigtwohill	1-14 - 2-14	Newcestown	Páirc Uí Chaoimh
	S Walsh 1-5 (0-2f), J Mulcahy 0-3, J Oke 0-2, A Walsh Barry, P O’Sullivan, B Twomey, S de Búrca 0-1 each.	Report	E Kenneally 1-8 (1-0 penalty, 0-7f), R O’Sullivan 1-1, L Meade, J Kelleher, C Dinneen, N Kelly, D Buckley 0-1 each.	Referee: W King (Banteer)

30 September 2023 Semi-final	Bride Rovers	Declared void	Blarney	Páirc Uí Chaoimh

14 October 2023 Semi-final replay	Bride Rovers	1-12 - 3-15	Blarney	Páirc Uí Chaoimh
	A Walsh (0-9, 0-4 frees, 0-1 65), C Tobin (1-0 free), D Dooley, J Ahern and L Roche (0-1 each).	Report	S Barrett (1-6, 0-2 frees), M Coleman (1-3, 1-0 pen, 0-1 sl), C Barrett (1-0), P Power (0-2), O Hegarty, P Crowley, C Hegarty and J O’Keeffe (0-1 each)	Referee: S Stokes (Tullylease)

=== Final ===
22 October 2023 Final	Newcestown	0-19 - 1-16	Blarney	Páirc Uí Chaoimh
	E Kenneally 0-6 (0-4f, 0-1 65), J Meade 0-4 (0-1 sideline), D Buckley 0-3, S O’Donovan, C Dinneen 0-2 each, T Horgan, R O’Sullivan 0-1 each.	Report	S Barrett 0-6 (0-4 f), P Power 1-2, M Coleman 0-3, C Hegarty, C Barrett, S Mulcahy, C Dunlea, O Hegarty 0-1 each.	Referee: M Maher (St Finbarr's)

28 October 2023 Final replay	Newcestown	3-17 - 0-24	Blarney	Páirc Uí Chaoimh
	E Kenneally (1-6, 0-5 frees); R O’Sullivan (1-4); C Dinneen (1-1); E Collins (0-2); S O’Donovan, J Meade (sideline), D Buckley, C O’Donovan (0-1 each).	Report	S Barrett (0-9, 0-4 frees, 0-1 ‘65); P Power (0-4); J O’Keeffe, M Coleman (sideline), S Mulcahy (0-2 each); C Dunlea, C Hegarty, C Barrett, E Kirby, C McCarthy (0-1 each).	Referee: C McAllister (Aghada)

== Championship statistics ==
=== Top scorers ===
Overall

Rank	Player	County	Tally	Total	Matches	Average
1	Shane Barrett	Blarney	1-69	72	7	10.28
2	Eddie Kenneally	Newcestown	5-54	69	7	9.85
3	Pa O'Callaghan	Ballyhea	2-31	37	3	12.33
4	Dylan McCarthy	Killeagh	0-34	34	4	8.50
5	Pádraig Holland	Inniscarra	4-21	33	4	8.25
5	Seán Walsh	Carrigtwohill	2-27	33	4	8.25
7	Mark Tobin	Mallow	1-27	30	4	7.50
8	Richard O'Sullivan	Newcestown	4-17	29	7	4.14
8	Brian O'Shea	Cloyne	1-26	29	4	7.25
10	Adam Walsh	Bride Rovers	0-28	28	3	9.33

In a single game

Rank	Player	Club	Tally	Total	Opposition
1	Pa O'Callaghan	Ballyhea	1-14	17	Blarney
2	Shane Barrett	Blarney	0-14	14	Ballyhea
3	Eddie Kenneally	Newcestown	1-10	13	Blarney
3	Eddie Kenneally	Newcestown	1-10	13	Courcey Rovers
5	Mark Tobin	Mallow	1-09	12	Cloyne
5	Pa O'Callaghan	Ballyhea	1-09	12	Courcey Rovers
5	Seán Walsh	Carrigtwohill	1-09	12	Mallow
5	Shane Barrett	Blarney	0-12	12	Courcey Rovers
9	Eddie Kenneally	Newcestown	1-08	11	Carrigtwohill
9	Eddie Kenneally	Newcestown	1-08	11	Killeagh
9	Shane Barrett	Blarney	0-11	11	Newcestown
9	Shane Barrett	Blarney	0-11	11	Cloyne

=== Miscellaneous ===
- The semi-final between Bride Rovers and Blarney was declared void and a replay ordered after an objection by Blarney was upheld. Bride Rovers had 16 players on the pitch in the play that led to them winning an equalising free in the void match.
