= 2020 Cork Senior A Hurling Championship =

Annual hurling competition season

- Dates: 31 July - 4 October 2020
- Teams: 12
- Sponsor: Co-Op Superstores
- Champions: Charleville (1st title); Alan Dennehy (captain); Claude Gough (manager)
- Runners-up: Fr. O'Neill's; Mike Millerick (captain); Paudie McMahon (captain); Dave Colbert (manager); Bryan Sweeney (manager)
- Relegated: Kilworth

Tournament statistics
- Matches played: 24
- Goals scored: 69 (2.88 per match)
- Points scored: 807 (33.63 per match)
- Top scorer(s): Darragh Fitzgibbon (2-51)

The 2020 Cork Senior A Hurling Championship was the first staging of the Cork Senior A Hurling Championship since its establishment by the Cork County Board. The draw for the group stage placings took place on 19 November 2019. The championship was scheduled to begin in April 2020, however, it was postponed indefinitely due to the impact of the COVID-19 pandemic on Gaelic games. The championship began on 31 July 2020 and ended on 4 October 2020.

On 4 October 2020, Charleville won the championship after a 3–12 to 1–14 win over Fr. O'Neill's in the final at Páirc Uí Chaoimh. This was their first championship title in the grade.

Charleville's Darragh Fitzgibbon was the championship's top scorer with 2-51.

== Format change ==
On 26 March 2019, three championship proposals were circulated to Cork club delegates. A core element running through all three proposals, put together by the Cork GAA games workgroup, was that there be a group stage of 12 teams and straight relegation and promotion. On 2 April 2019, a majority of 136 club delegates voted for Option A which would see one round of games played in April, with two more following in August – all with county players available.

== Team changes ==
=== To Championship ===
Regraded from the Cork Senior Hurling Championship

- Ballymartle
- Bandon
- Bride Rovers
- Charleville
- Kanturk
- Killeagh
- Newcestown

Promoted from the Cork Premier Intermediate Hurling Championship

- Cloyne
- Fermoy
- Fr. O'Neill's
- Kilworth
- Mallow

== Participating teams ==
Team	Location	Colours
Bandon	Bandon	Yellow and white
Ballymartle	Riverstick	Green and yellow
Bride Rovers	Rathcormac	Green, white and yellow
Charleville	Charleville	Red and white
Cloyne	Cloyne	Red and black
Fermoy	Fermoy	Black and yellow
Fr. O'Neill's	Ballymacoda/Ladysbridge	Green and red
Kanturk	Kanturk	Green and yellow
Killeagh	Killeagh	Green and white
Kilworth	Kilworth	Red and white
Mallow	Mallow	Red and yellow
Newcestown	Newcestown	Red and yellow

== Group A ==
=== Table ===
Advance to knockout stage Advance to relegation play-offs

Team	Matches				Score			Pts
Team	Pld	W	D	L	For	Against	Diff	Pts
Kanturk	3	3	0	0	10-51	3-42	30	6
Newcestown	3	2	0	1	4-59	7-35	15	4
Cloyne	3	1	0	2	4-42	4-60	-18	2
Killeagh	3	0	0	3	2-47	6-62	-27	0

=== Results ===
2 August 2020 Round 1	Kanturk	2-18 - 1-09	Cloyne	Mill Field
	L McLoughlin (1-4, 1 free, 1 ’65), L O’Neill (0-6), Aidan Walsh (1-2), B O’Sullivan (0-3), Alan Walsh (0-2), R Walsh (0-1).	Report	M Cahill (0-8, 6 frees), P O’Sullivan (1-0), B O’Shea (0-1).	Referee: T O'Donovan (Douglas)

2 August 2020 Round 1	Newcestown	1-18 - 1-13	Killeagh	Páirc Uí Rinn
	C Healy 1-9 (1-0 penalty, 0-9f), L Meade, C Dinneen 0-3 each, J Meade 0-2, C Keane 0-1.	Report	E Keniry (0-5f), R McCarthy (0-3f, 0-1 sl, 0-1 65) 0-5 each, G Leahy 1-0, S Long 0-2, K Murphy 0-1.	Referee: D Daly (Brian Dillons)

8 August 2020 Round 2	Kanturk	3-13 - 1-17	Newcestown	Coachford Sportsfield
	L McLoughlin (0-8 frees), R Walsh (2-1), L O’Keeffe (1-0), Alan Walsh, D Browne, B O’Sullivan, and A Nash (free) (0-1 each).	Report	C Healy (0-12, 10 frees), C Keane (1-0), F Keane (0-2), T Twomey, C Dineen, and D Twomey (free) (0-1 each).	Referee: B Sweeeny (Erin's Own)

9 August 2020 Round 2	Cloyne	0-24 - 0-18	Killeagh	Clonmult Memorial Park
	M Cahill 0-8 (0-7 f), A Walsh 0-5 (0-3 f), B Walsh 0-4, C Mullins and N Cahill 0-2 each, P O’Sullivan, K Dennehy and B Minihane 0-1 each.	Report	A Leahy 0-6, R McCarthy 0-5 f, G Leahy and E Keniry 0-2 each, S Long, D Walsh and S Walsh 0-1 each.	Referee: B Murphy (Carrigtwohill)

29 August 2020 Round 3	Killeagh	1-16 - 5-20	Kanturk	Castlelyons
	R McCarthy 0-7 (0-3 f, 0-3 65) S Long 0-4, D Landers 1-1, S Walsh 0-2, A Walsh, E Keniry 0-1 each.	Report	L McLoughlan 1-6 (1-2 f, 0-1 65) L O'Neill 1-3, I Walsh 0-4, J Fitzpatrick 1-1, Aidan Walsh 1-1, L O'Keeffe 1-0, P Walsh, B O'Sullivan 0-2 each, A Nash 0-1 f.	Referee: D Copps (Ballyhea)

29 August 2020 Round 3	Cloyne	3-09 - 2-24	Newcestown	Pairc Ui Rinn
	N Cahill 2-0, P O’Sullivan 0-3 (0-1 f), D O’Sullivan 1-0, B Walsh, M Cahill (f) 0-2 each, K Dennehy, A Walsh (0-1 f) 0-1 each.	Report	C Healy 0-10 (0-7 f), S O’Donovan 0-5, J Meade 0-3 (0-1 sl), T Twomey 1-1, C Keane 1-0, D Buckley 0-2, F Keane, J Kelleher, E Kenneally 0-1 each.	Referee: C O'Regan

== Group B ==
=== Table ===
Advance to knockout stage

Team	Matches				Score			Pts
Team	Pld	W	D	L	For	Against	Diff	Pts
Charleville	3	3	0	0	6-64	1-48	31	6
Bandon	3	1	1	1	1-56	4-59	-12	3
Fermoy	3	1	0	2	0-46	3-51	-14	2
Mallow	3	0	1	2	2-51	1-59	-5	1

=== Results ===
1 August 2020 Round 1	Bandon	0-17 - 3-21	Charleville	Mourne Abbey
	R Crowley (0-5, 0-4 frees, 0-1 65), D Crowley (0-1 free), M Sugrue and A Murphy (0-3 each), C Long (0-2), C O’Mahony (0-1).	Report	D Fitzgibbon (0-10, 0-7 frees, 0-1 65), J Doyle (2-3), M Kavanagh (0-4, 0-2 frees), D Casey (1-0), G Kelleher (0-2), D O’Flynn and T Hawe (0-1 each).	Referee: N O'Neill (Midleton)

2 August 2020 Round 1	Mallow	0-13 - 0-15	Fermoy	Castletownroche Sportsfield
	A Sheehan 0-8 (7 frees, 1 65); C Murphy 0-2; D Moynihan, P Lyons, P Hayes 0-1 each.	Report	D Lardner 0-6 (5 frees, 1 65); B O’Sullivan 0-4; S Aherne 0-3, K Morrisson, J Scannell 0-1 each.	Referee: D Copps (Ballyhea)

8 August 2020 Round 2	Charleville	0-22 - 1-16	Mallow	Fr. Kelleher Park
	D Fitzgibbon (0-11, 0-9 frees), J Doyle and A Cagney (0-3 each), G Kelleher and D O’Flynn (0-2 each), J O’Callaghan (0-1).	Report	A Sheehan (0-5, 0-3 frees, 0-2 65s), C Carroll (1-0), C Murphy (0-3), K Sheehan, D Hayes, and G Sweeney (0-2 each), F O’Neill and P Lyons (0-1 each).	Referee: C Lane (Banteer)

8 August 2020 Round 2	Fermoy	0-16 - 0-17	Bandon	Páirc Uí Rinn
	P de Roiste, J Carr (frees) (0-3 each), D Lardner (frees), T Clancy (frees), M Brennan, A Creed, A Aherne (0-2 each).	Report	R Crowley (0-8), M Sugrue, C Calnan, C Long (0-2 each), D Crowley, A Murphy, M Cahalane (free) (0-1 each).	Referee: D Daly (Brian Dillons)

29 August 2020 Round 3	Bandon	1-22 - 1-22	Mallow	Coachford
	R Crowley 0-7 (0-5f), M Sugrue 1-3, M Cahalane 0-5 (0-4 f), A Murphy 0-3, D Crowley (f), C Calnan, J Hickey, D Lucey 0-1 each.	Report	A Sheehan 0-12 (0-10 f), P Lyons 0-4, S Hayes 1-1, N O’Riordan 0-2, C Murphy, D Moynihan, C Carroll 0-1 each.	Referee: B Murphy

29 August 2020 Round 3	Charleville	3-21 - 0-15	Fermoy	Kildorrery
	D Fitzgibbon (1-11, 0-8 frees), A Cagney (0-5), D Casey and G Kelleher (1-0 each), D O’Flynn, J O’Callaghan, M Kavanagh, J Doyle and J O’Brien (0-1 each).	Report	L Coleman (0-7, 0-5 frees), D Lardner (0-4 frees), B O’Sullivan, M Brennan, A Aherne and D Daly (0-1 each).	Referee: N O'Neill

== Group C ==
=== Table ===
Advance to knockout stage Advance to relegation play-offs

Team	Matches				Score			Pts
Team	Pld	W	D	L	For	Against	Diff	Pts
Fr. O'Neill's	3	3	0	0	10-55	2-45	34	6
Bride Rovers	3	2	0	1	1-49	1-46	3	4
Ballymartle	3	1	0	2	4-40	9-52	-27	2
Kilworth	3	0	0	3	2-48	5-49	-10	0

=== Results ===
31 July 2020 Round 1	Fr. O'Neill's	3-16 - 0-18	Kilworth	St. Catherine's Park
	D Dalton 1-7 (0-3 f), B Dunne 1-4, M O’Keeffe 1-0, P McMahon, R Cullinane 0-2 each, K O’Sullivan 0-1.	Report	N McNamara 0-5 (0-3 f, 0-1 45), E Carey 0-4 (0-1 f), W Condon 0-3, L Whelan, J Sheehan 0-2 each, B Sheehan, M McNamara 0-1 each.

1 August 2020 Round 1	Ballymartle	0-12 - 1-17	Bride Rovers	Ballincollig Sportsfield
	Darren MCarthy 0-8 (0-5f), S O’Mahony (0-1f, 0-1 65), B Corry 0-2 each.	Report	W Finnegan 0-11 (0-7f), D Dooley 0-3, B Roche 1-0, P O’Flynn 0-2 (0-1 sideline), S Walsh 0-1.	Referee: B Sweeney (Erin's Own)

7 August 2020 Round 2	Bride Rovers	0-16 - 1-20	Fr. O'Neill's	Páirc Uí Rinn
	W Finnegan (0-10, 0-8 frees, 0-2 65s), B Roche (0-4), D Dooley (0-2).	Report	D Dalton (1-10, 0-5 frees, 0-1 sl, 0-1 65), M O’Keeffe, K O’Sullivan and J Hankard (0-2 each), R Cullinane, E Motherway, B Dunne and P McMahon (0-1 each).	Referee: C McAllister (Aghada)

8 August 2020 Round 2	Kilworth	2-16 - 2-17	Ballymartle	Grenagh Sports Complex
	J Sheehan (2-1), N McNamara (0-7, 0-6 frees), W Condon (0-4), L Whelan (0-3), K Walsh (0-1 free).	Report	Darren McCarthy (1-5, 0-2 frees, 0-1 65), B Corry (1-3), J McCarthy (0-5, 0-1 free), K McCarthy (0-2), G Webb and S Cummins (0-1 each).	Referee: T O'Donovan (Douglas)

29 August 2020 Round 3	Fr. O'Neill's	6-19 - 2-11	Ballymartle	Páirc Uí Chonaill
	D Dalton 2-8 (0-3 f, 0-2 sl) B Dunne 3-4, L O’Driscoll 1-2, K O’Sullivan 0-2, J Hankard, D Conway, P McMahon 0-1 each.	Report	B Corry 2-2, D McCarthy 0-7 (0-4 f), S O’Mahony 0-2.	Referee: T O'Donovan (Douglas)

29 August 2020 Round 3	Kilworth	0-14 - 0-16	Bride Rovers	Glanworth
	N McNamara 0-10 (0-9 f), K Walsh 0-1f, J Sheehan, B Sheehan, L Whelan 0-1 each.	Report	W Finnegan 0-8 (0-6 f), C O’Connor 0-2, D Dooley, J Mannix, E Roche, R Prendergast, P O’Flynn, B Roche 0-1 each.	Referee: B Coniry (Crosshaven)

== Knockout stage ==
=== Bracket ===
Quarter-Finals
Kanturk (Duhallow)	2-15
Bandon (Carbery)	0-15
Newcestown (Carbery)	1-14
Bride Rovers (Imokilly)	0-11

Semi-Finals
Charleville (Avondhu)	2-26
Kanturk (Duhallow)	3-18
Fr. O'Neill's (Imokilly)	4-13
Newcestown (Carbery)	1-13

Final
Charleville (Avondhu)	1-23
Fr. O'Neill's (Imokilly)	4-13

==== Relegation playoff ====
27 September 2020 Playoff	Kilworth	2-20 - 3-18	Killeagh	St. Catherine's Park
	N McNamara 0-7 (frees), E Carey 0-6, B Sheehan 1-1, J Sheehan 1-0, L Whelan, J McCarthy 0-2 each, J Saich (sideline), K Walsh (free) 0-1 each.	Report	E Keniry 1-12 (0-5 frees, 0-1 65), R McCarthy 2-0 (pens), G Leahy 0-2, K Murphy, K Treacy, P O’Neill, A Walsh 0-1 each.

==== Quarter-finals ====
13 September 2020 Quarter-final	Kanturk	2-15 - 0-15	Bandon	Coachford Sportsfield
	L McLoughlin (0-5 frees), Alan Walsh (1-1); B O’Sullivan (0-3, 1 65); L O’Keeffe (1-0); L O’Neill, Aidan Walsh (0-2 each); A Nash (free), I Walsh (0-1 each).	Report	M Cahalane (0-4 frees); D Crowley, C Long (2 frees) (0-3 each); R Crowley (frees), A Murphy (0-2 each), C O’Mahony (0-1).

13 September 2020 Quarter-final	Newcestown	1-14 - 0-11	Bride Rovers	Blarney Sportsfield
	C Healy (0-6, 4 frees, 1 65), S O’Donovan (1-1), J Meade, D Buckley (0-2 each), C Dinneen, D Twomey, F Keane (0-1 each).	Report	W Finnegan (0-5, 4 frees, 1 65), C O’Connor (frees), C Barry (1 free) 0-2 each, S Walsh, K Kearney (0-1 each).

==== Semi-finals ====
26 September 2020 Semi-final	Charleville	2-26 - 3-18	Kanturk	Mallow GAA Complex
	D Fitzgibbon (0-11, 0-9 frees), A Cagney (2-0), J Doyle and J O’Brien (0-4 each), T Hawe (0-2), M Kavanagh, G Kelleher, F Cagney, D O’Flynn and J O’Callaghan (0-1 each).	Report	I Walsh, Aidan Walsh and A Nash (1-0 pen, 0-1 free) (1-1 each), B O’Sullivan (0-4 frees), L McLoughlin (0-3, 0-2 frees, 0-1 65), R Walsh (0-2), Alan Walsh, L O’Neill, J Fitzpatrick, P Walsh and C Clernon (0-1 each).

27 September 2020 Semi-final	Fr. O'Neill's	4-13 - 1-13	Newcestown	Páirc Uí Rinn
	D Dalton 2-3 (1-2 f), L O’Driscoll 1-3, R Cullinane 1-0, B Dunne 0-3, P McMahon 0-2, K O’Sullivan, Joe Millerick 0-1 each.	Report	C Healy 1-4 (1-0 pen, 0-2 f, 0-1 65), L Meade, J Meade and E Kelly (f) 0-2 each, C O’Neill (65), T Twomey, J Kelleher 0-1 each.

==== Final ====
4 October 2020 Final	Charleville	1-23 - 4-13	Fr. O'Neill's	Páirc Uí Chaoimh
	D Fitzgibbon 1-8, (0-4 frees), D O’Flynn (0-6), A Cagney (0-3), J O’Brien and T Hawe (0-2 each), G Kelleher and M Kavanagh (0-1 each).	Report	D Dalton (1-7, 1-0 pen, 0-2 65, 0-1 free), B Dunne (2-1), J Hankard (1-0), L O’Driscoll (0-3), K O’Sullivan and R Cullinane (0-1 each).	Referee: C Lyons (Nemo Rangers)

== Championship statistics ==
=== Top scorers ===
Overall

Rank	Player	Club	Tally	Total	Matches	Average
1	Darragh Fitzgibbon	Charleville	2-51	57	5	11.40
2	Declan Dalton	Fr. O'Neill's	7-35	56	5	11.20
3	Cian Healy	Newcestown	2-41	47	5	9.40
4	William Finnegan	Bride Rovers	0-34	34	4	8.50
5	Lorcán McLoughlin	Kanturk	2-26	32	5	6.40
6	Billy Dunne	Fr. O'Neill's	6-13	31	5	6.20
7	Noel McNamara	Kilworth	0-29	29	4	7.25
8	Aaron Sheehan	Mallow	0-25	25	3	8.33
9	Darren McCarthy	Ballymartle	1-20	23	3	7.66
9	Eoghan Keniry	Killeagh	1-20	23	4	5.75

In a single game

Rank	Player	Club	Tally	Total	Opposition
1	Eoghan Keniry	Killeagh	1-12	15	Kilworth
2	Declan Dalton	Fr. O'Neill's	2-08	14	Ballymartle
2	Darragh Fitzgibbon	Charleville	1-11	14	Fermoy
3	Billy Dunne	Fr. O'Neill's	3-04	13	Ballymartle
3	Declan Dalton	Fr. O'Neill's	1-10	13	Bride Rovers
4	Cian Healy	Newcestown	1-09	12	Killeagh
4	Cian Healy	Newcestown	0-12	12	Kanturk
4	Aaron Sheehan	Mallow	0-12	12	Bandon
5	William Finnegan	Bride Rovers	0-11	11	Ballymartle
5	Darragh Fitzgibbon	Charleville	0-11	11	Mallow
5	Darragh Fitzgibbon	Charleville	0-11	11	Kanturk

=== Match records ===
- Widest winning margin: 20 points
  - Fr. O'Neill's 6-19 - 2-11 Ballymartle (Group Stage Round 3)
- Most goals in a match: 8
  - Fr. O'Neill's 6-19 - 2-11 Ballymartle (Group Stage Round 3)
- Most points in a match: 44
  - Bandon 1-22 - 1-22 Mallow (Group Stage Round 3)
  - Cahrleville 2-26 - 3-18 Kanturk (semi-final)
- Most goals by one team in a match: 6
  - Fr. O'Neill's 6-19 - 2-11 Ballymartle (Group Stage Round 3)
- Most goals scored by a losing team: 4
  - Glen Rovers 4-18 - 4-26 Blackrock (Final)
- Most points scored by a losing team: 20
  - Kilworth 2-20 - 3-18 Killeagh (Relegation playoff)

=== Miscellaneous ===
- The relegation play-off match between Killeagh and Kilworth was originally scheduled to take place on 13 September but was postponed after one of the Killeagh players tested positive for COVID-19.
