= 2025 Tipperary Senior Hurling Championship =

- Dates: 9 August 2025 - 26 October 2025
- Teams: 16
- Sponsor: FBD Insurance
- Champions: Loughmore–Castleiney (6th title); Liam McGrath (captain); Éamonn Kelly (manager)
- Runners-up: Nenagh Éire Óg; Conor Ryan (captain); Hugh Moloney (manager)
- Relegated: Lorrha–Dorrha

Tournament statistics
- Matches played: 34
- Goals scored: 107 (3.15 per match)
- Points scored: 1383 (40.68 per match)
- Top scorer(s): John McGrath (5-53)

The 2025 Tipperary Senior Hurling Championship is the 134th staging of the Tipperary Senior Hurling Championship since its establishment by the Tipperary County Board in 1887.

The defending champions were Loughmore–Castleiney. They defended their title following a 2-22 to 1-22 win against Nenagh Éire Óg.

== Team changes ==
=== To Championship ===
Promoted from the Tipperary Premier Intermediate Hurling Championship

- Cashel King Cormacs

=== From Championship ===
Relegated to the Tipperary Premier Intermediate Hurling Championship

- Templederry Kenyons

== Divisional championship finals ==
Division	Winner	Score	Runner-up	Score	Ref
Mid	JK Brackens	1-22	Moycarkey–Borris	2-18	
North	Kiladangan	0-20	Borris–Ileigh	0-19	
South	Carrick Swans	1-17	Killenaule	0-15	
West	Clonoulty–Rossmore	2-17	Cashel King Cormacs	1-16	

== Group stage ==
The draw for the group stage took place on 27 March 2025.

Advance to quarter-finals
Advance to preliminary-quarter-finals
Advance to relegation semi-final
Advance to preliminary-quarter-final and relegation semi-final

=== Group 1 ===
Team	Matches				Score			Pts
Team	Pld	W	D	L	For	Against	Diff	Pts
Holycross–Ballycahill	3	2	0	1	8-65	6-65	+6	4
Toomevara	3	2	0	1	2-81	4-54	+21	4
Kiladangan	3	1	0	2	5-51	5-66	-15	2
Clonoulty–Rossmore	3	1	0	2	5-56	5-68	-12	2

==== Results ====
9 August 2025 Round 1	Toomevara	0-28 – 2-25	Holycross–Ballycahill	Borrisoleigh
19:00	Darragh McCarthy 0-16 (15f), Kevin McCarthy, Jack Delaney and Conor O'Meara 0-3 each, Conor O'Farrell, Adam Hall and Mark McCarthy 0-1 each	Report	Darragh Woods 0-11 (7f), David Fogarty 1-1, Mikey Nally 0-4, Joe Caesar 1-0 (p), Robbie Ryan 0-3, Eoin Craddock and James Doyle 0-2 each, Ewan Bourke (f) and Liam Doyle 0-1 each	Referee: Fergal Horgan

10 August 2025 Round 1	Kiladangan	2-20 – 0-21	Clonoulty–Rossmore	Templemore
13:00	Willie Connors 0-6 (3f), Conor Byrne 0-5 (4f, 1 65'), Tadhg Gallagher 1-2, Conor Culhane 1-0, Billy Seymour 0-3, Paul Flynn 0-2, Bryan McLoughney and Dara O'Dwyer 0-1 each	Report	Stephen Ferncombe 0-10 (9f), Enda Heffernan 0-4, Cathal Bourke 0-3, Jack Ryan 0-2, Danny Slattery and Robert Doyle 0-1 each	Referee: Joe Leahy

23 August 2025 Round 2	Holycross–Ballycahill	4-19 – 2-18	Kiladangan	Templemore
18:15	Darragh Woods 1-6 (0-4f), Mikey Nally 2-0, Tiarnan Ryan 1-2, Cathal O'Reilly, David Fogarty and Robbie Ryan 0-2 each, Cathal Barrett, Joe Caesar, Tadhg Gould, Eoin Craddock and Paraic Russell 0-1 each	Report	Conor Byrne 0-7 (5f), Seán Hayes 1-2, Dan O'Meara 1-1, Billy Seymour and Paul Flynn 0-2 each, Willie Connors, Alan Flynn, Joe Gallagher and Tadhg Gallagher 0-1 each	Referee: John McCormack

24 August 2025 Round 2	Clonoulty–Rossmore	1-16 – 1-27	Toomevara	The Ragg
14:30	Stephen Ferncombe 1-8 (1-8f), Michael Ryan Winnie 0-3, Cathal Bourke, Enda Heffernan, Ronan Heffernan, John O'Keeffe and Danny Slattery 0-1 each	Report	Darragh McCarthy 1-8 (0-8f), Adam Hall 0-5, Kevin McCarthy 0-4, Jack Delaney 0-3, Jake Hackett 0-2, Darren Delaney, Austin Duff, Josh McCarthy, Conor O'Farrell and Paul Ryan 0-1 each	Referee: John Dooley

7 September 2025 Round 3	Kiladangan	1-13 – 1-26	Toomevara	Dolla
17:00	Willie Connors 1-5 (0-2f), Tadhg Gallagher, Conor Byrne (2f) and Paul Flynn 0-2 each, Billy Seymour and Seán Hayes 0-1 each	Report	Darragh McCarthy 1-12 (0-10f), Conor O'Farell 0-3, Kevin McCarthy and Adam Hall 0-2 each, Barry O'Connell, Josh McCarthy, Darren Delaney, Conor O'Meara, Jack Delaney, Austin Duff and Jake Hackett 0-1 each	Referee: Michael Kennedy

7 September 2025 Round 3	Clonoulty–Rossmore	4-19 – 2-21	Holycross–Ballycahill	Boherlahan
17:00	Stephen Ferncombe 2-8 (1-7f), Cathal Bourke 1-5, Ciaran Quirke 1-0, Jack Ryan 0-2, Jamie Davern, Stevie Quinn, Nathan Slattery and Michael Ryan Winnie 0-1 each	Report	Darragh Woods 0-11 (10f), Jimmie Lahart 1-2, Joe Caesar 1-0, Eoin Craddock 0-2, Liam Doyle, Paraic Russell, James Doyle, David Fogarty and Robbie Ryan 0-1 each	Referee: Ciaran O'Donovan

=== Group 2 ===
Team	Matches				Score			Pts
Team	Pld	W	D	L	For	Against	Diff	Pts
Nenagh Éire Óg	3	2	0	1	5-63	5-47	+16	4
Cashel King Cormacs	3	2	0	1	3-64	2-62	+5	4
Thurles Sarsfields	3	2	0	1	4-63	4-60	+3	4
Mullinahone	3	0	0	3	4-50	5-71	-24	0

==== Results ====
9 August 2025 Round 1	Thurles Sarsfields	3-15 – 1-26	Nenagh Éire Óg	The Ragg
16:30	Conor Stakelum 0-6 (4f), Darragh Stakelum 2-0, Ronan Maher 1-1, Paddy Creedon 0-3, Liam McCormack 0-2, Robbie Stapleton, Seanie Butler and Cathal Moloney 0-1 each	Report	Mikey Heffernan 0-10 (6f), Sam O'Farrell 0-5, Jake Morris 0-4, James Mackey 1-0, Philip Hickey 0-2, Adam Healy, Ben West, Mason Cawley, Josh Keller and Conor Ryan 0-1 each	Referee: John McCormack

10 August 2025 Round 1	Cashel King Cormacs	2-24 – 0-24	Mullinahone	Littleton
13:00	Eoghan Connolly 1-5 (1-0p, 0-1 65', 0-1 sl), Devon Ryan 1-3 (0-2f), Ronan Connolly 0-4, Ger Browne and Ross Bonnar 0-3 each, Conor O'Dwyer and David McGrath 0-2 each, Cathal Quinn and Oisín O'Donoghue 0-1 each	Report	Seán Curran 0-13 (10f), Enda Keane 0-3, Conor Whelan (1f) and Sam Rowan 0-2 each, Martin Kehoe, Eoin O'Dwyer, Mikey O'Shea and Graham Horan 0-1 each	Referee: Sean Everard

23 August 2025 Round 2	Mullinahone	2-15 – 1-23	Thurles Sarsfields	Cashel
16:15	Seán Curran 0-11 (7f), Martin Kehoe and Eoin O'Dwyer 1-0 each, Mikey O'Shea, Conor Whelan (1f), Enda Keane and Sam Rowan 0-1 each	Report	Darragh Stakelum 1-10 (0-10f), Conor Stakelum (1f) and Liam McCormack 0-3 each, Eoin Purcell and Paddy Creedon 0-2 each, Denis Maher, Stephen Cahill and Billy McCarthy 0-1 each	Referee: Alan Tierney

24 August 2025 Round 2	Cashel King Cormacs	0-21 – 2-13	Nenagh Éire Óg	Borrisoleigh
16:00	Devon Ryan 0-7 (6f, 1 65'), Ger Browne, Ross Bonnar, Oisín O'Donoghue and Eoghan Connolly (2f) 0-3 each, Conor O'Dwyer and Paddy Fahey 0-1 each	Report	Mikey Heffernan 0-8 (7f), Jake Morris 1-1 (1-0p), Adam Carey 1-0, James Mackey, Ben West, Barry Heffernan and Paddy Murphy 0-1 each	Referee: Conor Doyle

6 September 2025 Round 3	Mullinahone	2-11 – 2-24	Nenagh Éire Óg	Templetuohy
16:30	Graham Horan 0-7 (6f), Seán Curran 1-2 (0-1f), Danny Dunne 1-0, Sam Rowan and Enda Keane (1 sl) 0-1 each		Mikey Heffernan 1-11 (0-7f), Sam O'Farrell and Jake Morris 0-4 each, Tommy Heffernan 1-0, Josh Keller 0-3, James Mackey and Ben West 0-1 each	Referee: Joe Leahy

6 September 2025 Round 3	Cashel King Cormacs	1-19 – 0-25	Thurles Sarsfields	Holycross
16:30	Eoghan Connolly 1-4 (1-0p, 0-2f), Devon Ryan 0-5 (4f), Ger Browne 0-3, Cathal Quinn, Ronan Connolly and Ross Bonnar 0-2 each, Oisín O'Donoghue 0-1	Report	Darragh Stakelum 0-9 (7f), Conor Stakelum 0-5 (3f), Eoin Purcell 0-4, Ronan Maher and Billy McCarthy 0-2 each, Liam McCormack, Paddy Creedon and Stephen Cahill 0-1 each	Referee: Shane O'Neill

=== Group 3 ===
Team	Matches				Score			Pts
Team	Pld	W	D	L	For	Against	Diff	Pts
Loughmore–Castleiney	3	3	0	0	7-76	4-57	+28	6
Drom & Inch	3	2	0	1	7-62	6-55	+10	4
JK Brackens	3	1	0	2	5-65	7-68	-9	2
Lorrha–Dorrha	3	0	0	3	6-55	8-78	-29	0

==== Results ====
9 August 2025 Round 1	Drom & Inch	1-20 – 2-18	Loughmore–Castleiney	Templemore
19:00	Séamus Callanan 1-10 (1-8f), Lorcan Campion 0-4, Cormac Fitzpatrick 0-3, John Campion 0-2, Fintan Purcell 0-1	Report	John McGrath 2-9 (0-6f), Ciaran Connolly and Liam McGrath 0-2 each, Noel McGrath, Tommy Maher, Ed Connolly, John Ryan and Aidan McGrath 0-1 each	Referee: Conor Doyle

10 August 2025 Round 1	JK Brackens	2-28 – 2-18	Lorrha–Dorrha	MacDonagh Park
18:00	Shane Doyle 1-7 (1-4f, 0-1 sl), Andrew Ormond 0-7, Jamie Ormond 0-6, Stephen Cahill 1-0, Conor Cadell, Ned Delaney, Eanna McBride and Lyndon Fairbrother 0-2 each		Colm Fogarty 0-7 (6f), Patrick Maher and Alan O'Meara 1-1 each, Niall McIntyre 0-3, Conor Kennedy 0-2, Eoin McIntyre, Donnacha O'Meara, Cian Hogan and Michael Dolan (f) 0-1 each	Referee: Peter Carroll

23 August 2025 Round 2	Drom & Inch	3-24 – 3-20	Lorrha–Dorrha	Cloughjordan
18:30	Séamus Callanan 1-5 (0-4f), Cormac Fitzpatrick 1-4, David Collins 0-6, Cormac Cahill 1-0, Lorcan Campion 0-2, David Butler, John Ryan, Johnny Ryan, Robbie Long, Podge Campion, Tony Cahill and John Campion 0-1 each	Report	Colm Fogarty 0-7 (5f, 1 65'), Cian Hogan 1-4, Donnacha O'Meara and Patrick Maher 1-1 each, Conor Kennedy 0-4, Eoin McIntyre 0-2, Christopher Fogarty 0-1	Referee: Kevin Jordan

24 August 2025 Round 2	JK Brackens	2-20 – 2-32	Loughmore–Castleiney	Templetuohy
14:30	Shane Doyle 0-10 (10f), Andrew Ormond 2-2, Ned Walshe, Jamie Ormond, Lyndon Fairbrother, Paddy Cadell, Eanna McBride, Ciaran O'Shea, Ned Delaney and Michael Cahill 0-1 each	Report	John McGrath 0-12 (10f), Noel McGrath 0-6, Tomas McGrath and Paul McCahey 1-1 each, Brian McGrath, Liam McGrath and Ed Connolly 0-2 each, Ciaran Connolly, John Ryan, Willie Eviston, Ciaran McGrath, Philip O'Connell and Aidan McGrath 0-1 each	Referee: Ciaran O'Donovan
Note: Live on TG4

6 September 2025 Round 3	Lorrha–Dorrha	1-17 – 3-26	Loughmore–Castleiney	Cloughjordan
17:30	Colm Fogarty 0-12 (10f), Cian Hogan 1-1, Patrick Maher 0-2, Michael Dolan (1f) and Christopher Fogarty 0-1 each	Report	John McGrath 1-11 (0-9f, 0-1 65'), Mikey Ryan and Ed Connolly 1-3 each, Noel McGrath 0-4, Liam Treacy, Philip O'Connell, Tomas McGrath, Joey Quinn and Eamonn Connolly 0-1 each	Referee: Conor Doyle

6 September 2025 Round 3	Drom & Inch	3-18 – 1-17	JK Brackens	Borrisoleigh
17:30	Séamus Callanan 0-6 (0-4f, 0-1 65'), Lorcan Campion 1-2, John Ryan and Jack Lillis 1-0 each, Cormac Fitzpatrick 0-3, Robbie Long, Podge Campion, Mark Conroy, David Collins and John Campion 0-1 each		Shane Doyle 1-7 (0-6f, 0-1 65', 1-0p), Jamie Ormond 0-4, Cathal Scully, Sean Walsh, Andrew Ormond, Lyndon Fairbrother and Conor Cadell 0-1 each	Referee: Alan Tierney

=== Group 4 ===
Team	Matches				Score			Pts
Team	Pld	W	D	L	For	Against	Diff	Pts
Moycarkey–Borris	3	2	0	1	7-61	4-65	+5	4
Kilruane MacDonaghs	3	2	0	1	2-71	5-55	+7	4
Borris–Ileigh	3	1	1	1	4-55	4-55	0	3
Roscrea	3	0	1	2	2-54	2-66	-12	1

==== Results ====
9 August 2025 Round 1	Roscrea	1-18 – 1-24	Moycarkey–Borris	Templemore
17:00	Shane Fletcher 0-6 (5f), Kenny Lee 1-0, Darragh Tynan 0-3, Alan Tynan and Evan Fitzpatrick 0-2 each, Michael Campion, Conor Phelan, Jason Gilmartin, Leigh Loughnane and Jack Lee 0-1 each		Kieran Morris 0-9 (7f), Jack Hayes 0-5, Bill Flanagan 1-0, Kieran Cummins and Joe Maher 0-2 each, Jack Fallon, Rory Darmody, Max Hackett, David Costigan, Kyle Shelly (f) and Joe Egan 0-1 each	Referee: Kevin Jordan

10 August 2025 Round 1	Kilruane MacDonaghs	1-22 – 1-15	Borris–Ileigh	Dolla
15:30	Willie Cleary 0-8 (7f), Kian O'Kelly 1-2, Jerome Cahill 0-4, Niall O'Meara and Thomas Cleary 0-2 each, Craig Morgan (f), Michael Cleary, Shane Cleary and Eoin Hogan 0-1 each		James Devaney 1-2, Patrick Ryan 0-5 (5f), Jerry Kelly 0-3, Eddie Ryan 0-2 (2f), Sean McCormack, Conor Kenny and Paddy McCormack 0-1 each	Referee: Alan Tierney

23 August 2025 Round 2	Borris–Ileigh	0-19 – 1-16	Roscrea	Templemore
16:30	Patrick Ryan 0-8 (8f), James Devaney 0-5, Jerry Kelly 0-2, Colm Boyle, Dan McCormack, Tom Delaney (1f) and Paddy McCormack 0-1 each	Report	Shane Fletcher 0-5 (5f), Jason Gilmartin 1-0, Darragh Tynan, Alan Tynan and Evan Fitzpatrick 0-2 each, Enda Moloney (1f), Michael Campion, Conor Sheedy, Dan Ryan and Leigh Loughnane 0-1 each	Referee: Sean Everard

24 August 2025 Round 2	Kilruane MacDonaghs	0-26 – 4-20	Moycarkey–Borris	Templederry
18:30	Willie Cleary 0-9 (9f), Shane Cleary 0-4, Kian O'Kelly and Michael Cleary (1f) 0-3 each, Niall O'Meara (1f) and Cian Darcy 0-2 each, Jerome Cahill, Eoin Hogan and Craig Morgan 0-1 each	Report	Kieran Morris 2-8 (0-7f), Joe Maher 1-2, Jack Hayes 1-1, Max Hackett 0-3, Kyle Shelly 0-2, Rhys Shelly (1f), Kieran Cummins, Jack Fallon and Joe Egan 0-1 each	Referee: Fergal Horgan

7 September 2025 Round 3	Kilruane MacDonaghs	1-23 – 0-20	Roscrea	MacDonagh Park
16:00	Willie Cleary 0-11 (10f), Cian Darcy 1-4, Niall O'Meara and Thomas Cleary 0-2 each, Paidi Williams, Michael Cleary, Shane Cleary and Kian O'Kelly 0-1 each	Report	Shane Fletcher 0-7 (7f), Darragh Tynan 0-6, Dan Ryan and Evan Fitzpatrick 0-2 each, Alan Tynan, Conor Dooley and Kenny Lee 0-1 each	Referee: Peter Carroll

7 September 2025 Round 3	Borris–Ileigh	3-21 – 2-17	Moycarkey–Borris	The Ragg
16:00	Eddie Ryan 1-15 (0-10f, 0-1 65', 0-1p), Paddy McCormack 1-1, Ray McCormack 1-0, James Devaney 0-2, Tom Delaney, Jerry Kelly and Conor Kenny 0-1 each		Kieran Morris 0-8 (6f), Max Hackett 1-2, Bill Flanagan 1-1, Kieran Cummins 0-3 (1 sl), Stephen Walsh, Joe Egan and Jack Hayes 0-1 each	Referee: John McCormack

== Relegation ==
=== Relegation semi-finals ===
27 September 2025 Relegation semi-final	Roscrea	1-21 – 1-18	Lorrha–Dorrha	Cloughjordan
16:00				Referee: Ciaran O'Donovan

28 September 2025 Relegation semi-final	Clonoulty–Rossmore	2-21 – 1-15	Mullinahone	Cashel
16:00				Referee: John Dooley

=== Relegation final ===
12 October 2025 Relegation final	Mullinahone	2-19 – 2-15	Lorrha–Dorrha	Templemore
14:30				Referee: Kevin Jordan

== Knockout stage ==
=== Bracket ===
Preliminary Quarter-Finals; 20 & 21 September 2025
JK Brackens	0-15
Toomevara	0-18
Clonoulty–Rossmore	3-23
Drom & Inch	4-21
Kiladangan	3-15
Kilruane MacDonaghs	3-19

Quarter-Finals; 27 & 28 September 2025
Holycross–Ballycahill	4-23
Cashel King Cormacs	2-17
Loughmore–Castleiney	3-22
Toomevara	2-20
Moycarkey–Borris	1-28
Drom & Inch (a.e.t.)	7-23
Nenagh Éire Óg	1-24
Kilruane MacDonaghs	2-15

Semi-Finals; 11 & 12 October 2025
Holycross–Ballycahill	0-15
Loughmore–Castleiney	1-18
Drom & Inch	1-12
Nenagh Éire Óg	1-20

Final; 26 October 2025
Loughmore–Castleiney	2-22
Nenagh Éire Óg	1-22

=== Preliminary quarter-finals ===
20 September 2025 Preliminary quarter-final	JK Brackens	0-15 – 0-18	Toomevara	Borrisoleigh
16:00	Shane Doyle 0-8 (7f), Ciaran O'Shea and Lyndon Fairbrother 0-2 each, Cathal Scully, Conor Cadell and Andrew Ormond 0-1 each	Report	Darragh McCarthy 0-9 (7f, 1 65'), Jack Delaney 0-4, Conor O'Farrell, Paul Ryan, Adam Hall, Conor O'Meara and Mark McCarthy (1sl) 0-1 each	Referee: John McCormack

21 September 2025 Preliminary quarter-final	Clonoulty–Rossmore	3-23 – 4-21	Drom & Inch	Boherlahan
15:30	Stephen Ferncombe 2-16 (2-12f, 0-1 65'), Jimmy Maher 1-0, Enda Heffernan and Ronan Heffernan 0-2 each, Stevie Quinn, Jack Ryan and Michael Ryan Winnie 0-1 each	Report	Séamus Callanan 0-9 (6f, 1 65'), David Collins 2-0, Cormac Fitzpatrick 0-4, Cormac Cahill and Paudie Kinnane 1-0 each, John Campion and Johnny Ryan 0-2 each, Robbie Long, Mark Conroy, Lorcan Campion and John Ryan 0-1 each	Referee: Peter Carroll

21 September 2025 Preliminary quarter-final	Kiladangan	3-15 – 3-19	Kilruane MacDonaghs	MacDonagh Park
15:30	Bryan McLoughney 2-0, Joe Gallagher 1-2, Paul Flynn 0-5, Seán Hayes 0-4 , Willie Connors 0-2 (2f), Tadhg Gallagher and Conor Byrne 0-1 each	Report	Willie Cleary 0-8 (5f), Kian O'Kelly 2-0, Niall O'Meara 1-2 (1-0p), Jerome Cahill 0-3, Shane Cleary and Cian Darcy 0-2 each, Craig Morgan and Conor Austin 0-1 each	Referee: Kevin Jordan

=== Quarter-finals ===
27 September 2025 Quarter-final	Holycross–Ballycahill	4-23 – 2-17	Cashel King Cormacs	Semple Stadium
14:30	Darragh Woods 0-13 (9f), Robbie Ryan 2-2, Eoin Craddock 1-3, Joe Caesar 1-1, Tiarnan Ryan 0-2, Mikey Nally and Luke O'Mara 0-1 each	Report	Devon Ryan 0-8 (6f), Ross Bonnar 0-4, Cathal Quinn and Ronan Connolly 1-0 each, Eoghan Connolly and Ger Browne 0-2 each, Conor O'Dwyer 0-1	Referee: Michael Kennedy

27 September 2025 Quarter-final	Loughmore–Castleiney	3-22 – 2-20	Toomevara	Semple Stadium
16:30	John McGrath 1-7 (0-7f), Ed Connolly 1-5, Ciaran McCormack 0-4 (3sl), Tomas McGrath 1-0, Noel McGrath and Paul McCahey 0-2 each, Ciaran Connolly and Liam McGrath 0-1 each	Report	Darragh McCarthy 0-9 (6f), Jack Delaney 1-3, Seamus O'Farrell 1-0, Adam Hall and Kevin McCarthy 0-2 each, Darren Delaney, Conor O'Farrell, Paul Ryan and Jake Hackett 0-1 each	Referee: Kevin Jordan

28 September 2025 Quarter-final	Moycarkey–Borris	1-28 – 7-23 (a.e.t.)	Drom & Inch	Semple Stadium
14:00	Kieran Morris 0-12 (10f, 1 65'), Jack Hayes 1-2, Rhys Shelly (2f), Jack Fallon, David Costigan and Killian Cantwell 0-2 each, Stephen Walsh, Joe Egan, Kieran Cummins, Max Hackett, Bill Flanagan and Pat Molloy 0-1 each	Report	Séamus Callanan 2-11 (0-8f), David Butler 2-0, Cormac Fitzpatrick 1-3, Jack Lillis and Jamie Bergin 1-0 each, Robbie Long and David Collins 0-2 each, Podge Campion, Fintan Purcell, Cormac Cahill, Paudie Kinnane and Mark Conroy 0-1 each	Referee: Conor Doyle

28 September 2025 Quarter-final	Nenagh Éire Óg	1-24 – 2-15	Kilruane MacDonaghs	Semple Stadium
16:00	Mikey Heffernan 0-12 (6f, 2 65'), Jake Morris 1-3 (1-0p), Sam O'Farrell and Tommy Heffernan 0-3 each, Mason Cawley 0-2, Conor Ryan 0-1	Report	Willie Cleary 0-6 (4f, 1 65'), Thomas Cleary 1-1, Kieran Cahill 1-0, Michael Cleary 0-3, Niall O'Meara 0-2, Cian Darcy, Kian O'Kelly and Aaron Morgan 0-1 each	Referee: John McCormack

=== Semi-finals ===
11 October 2025 Semi-final	Holycross–Ballycahill	0-15 – 1-18	Loughmore–Castleiney	Semple Stadium
16:10	Darragh Woods 0-5 (3f, 2sl), Robbie Ryan 0-4 (1f), Liam Doyle 0-2, Ewan Bourke (1f), Joe Caesar, Eoin Craddock and Tiarnan Ryan 0-1 each	Report	John McGrath 0-9 (9f), Noel McGrath 0-4, Ciaran McCormack 1-0 (sl), Willie Eviston, Ciaran Connolly, Tomas McGrath, Liam McGrath and Ciaran McGrath 0-1 each	Referee: Alan Tierney
Note: Live on RTÉ2

12 October 2025 Semi-final	Drom & Inch	1-12 – 1-20	Nenagh Éire Óg	Semple Stadium
16:00	Séamus Callanan 0-6 (5f, 1 65'), Paudie Kinnane 1-0, Johnny Ryan 0-3, Podge Campion, John Campion and Fintan Purcell 0-1 each	Report	Sam O'Farrell 0-9 (6f, 2 65'), Ben West 1-3, Tommy Heffernan and Jake Morris 0-2 each, Mason Cawley, Philip Hickey, Barry Heffernan and James Mackey 0-1 each	Referee: Michael Kennedy

=== Final ===
26 October 2025 Final	Loughmore–Castleiney	2-22 – 1-22	Nenagh Éire Óg	Semple Stadium
15:45	John McGrath 1-5 (1-5f), Liam McGrath 1-3, Ciaran McCormack (1sl) and Tomas McGrath 0-3 each, Noel McGrath and Ciaran Connolly 0-2 each, Brian McGrath, Ed Meagher, Ed Connolly and Liam Treacy 0-1 each	Report	Mikey Heffernan 1-8 (1-3f, 0-1 65'), Jake Morris 0-5, Mason Cawley, Josh Keller and Philip Hickey 0-2 each, James Mackey, Sam O'Farrell and Tommy Heffernan 0-1 each	Referee: Conor Doyle
Note: Live on TG4

== Championship statistics ==
=== Top scorers ===
==== Overall ====
Rank	Player	Club	Tally	Total	Matches	Average
1	John McGrath	Loughmore–Castleiney	5-53	68	6	11.33
2	Darragh McCarthy	Toomevara	2-54	60	5	12
3	Séamus Callanan	Drom & Inch	4-47	59	6	9.83
4	Stephen Ferncombe	Clonoulty–Rossmore	5-42	57	4	14.25
5	Mikey Heffernan	Nenagh Éire Óg	2-49	55	5	11
5	Darragh Woods	Holycross–Ballycahill	1-46	49	5	9.8
7	Kieran Morris	Moycarkey–Borris	2-37	43	4	10.75
8	Willie Cleary	Kilruane MacDonaghs	0-42	42	5	8.6
9	Shane Doyle	JK Brackens	2-32	38	4	9.5
10	Seán Curran	Mullinahone	1-26	29	3	9.67

==== In a single game ====
Rank	Player	Club	Tally	Total	Opposition
1	Stephen Ferncombe	Clonoulty–Rossmore	2-16	22	Drom & Inch
2	Eddie Ryan	Borris–Ileigh	1-15	18	Moycarkey–Borris
3	Séamus Callanan	Drom & Inch	2-11	17	Moycarkey–Borris
4	Darragh McCarthy	Toomevara	0-16	16	Holycross–Ballycahill
5	John McGrath	Loughmore–Castleiney	2-9	15	Drom & Inch
5	Darragh McCarthy	Toomevara	1-12	15	Kiladangan
7	Kieran Morris	Moycarkey–Borris	2-8	14	Kilruane MacDonaghs
7	Stephen Ferncombe	Clonoulty–Rossmore	2-8	14	Holycross–Ballycahill
7	John McGrath	Loughmore–Castleiney	1-11	14	Lorrha–Dorrha
7	Mikey Heffernan	Nenagh Éire Óg	1-11	14	Mullinahone
