= 2025 Tipperary county hurling team season =

Hurling (sport) season

- Team: Tipperary county
- Manager: Liam Cahill
- Captain: Ronan Maher
- All-Ireland SHC: Winners
- Munster SHC: 3rd in Group Stage
- National League: Finalists
- Top scorer Championship: Jason Forde (3-46)
- Highest SHC attendance: 82,331 (v Cork 20 Jul)
- Lowest SHC attendance: 6,640 (v Laois 14 June)
- Standard Kit

The 2025 season was Liam Cahill's third year as manager of the Tipperary senior hurling team.

On 23 January Ronan Maher was again named as captain for 2025, with Jake Morris also retained as vice-captain.

The team was sponsored for the fourth year by financial services technology solutions company Fiserv.

On 20 July 2025, Tipperary defeated Cork by 3–27 to 1–19 in the All-Ireland final and claimed a 29th All-Ireland title.

== 2025 senior hurling management team ==
Liam Cahill continued as manager for the third year of a three-year term with Toomevara's Michael Bevans continuing as coach. Loughmore Castleiney's Declan Laffan and Clonoulty Rossmore's TJ Ryan also continued as selectors, with Tony Browne leaving his role as coaching support and performance analyst. David Herity was named as coaching support for the team. Former rugby player Cathal Sheridan was also part of the back-room team as a sport psychologist.

=== 2025 squad ===
On 23 January, manager Liam Cahill announced his 38-man panel for the 2025 National Hurling League. Under 20 championship players Darragh McCarthy, Sam O'Farrell, Conor Martin, Aaron O’Halloran and Oisin O’Donoghue were named in the panel alongside other newcomers David Nolan, Kieran Cummins and Dylan Walsh. Five players, Seán Hayes, Jack Leamy, Cathal Quinn, Seán Ryan and Stephen Walsh were cut from the initial 45 man training squad at the end of January. Two-time All-Star Cathal Barrett was omitted from the squad for 2025. Barry Heffernan and Mark Kehoe were not available after opting to go travelling during the year.

The following players made their competitive senior debut in 2025:

- Darragh McCarthy against Galway on 26 January.
- Dylan Walsh against Galway on 26 January.
- Sam O'Farrell against Galway on 26 January.
- Michael Corcoran against Galway on 26 January
- Robert Doyle against Galway on 26 January.
- Conor Martin against Galway on 26 January.
- Gavin O'Halloran against Wexford on 2 February.
- Josh Keller against Wexford on 2 February.
- Oisin O’Donoghue against Wexford on 2 February.
- Joe Caesar against Cork on 22 February.
- Peter McGarry against Laois on 14 June.

The team below played Cork in the 2025 All-Ireland Senior Hurling Championship Final, on 20 July:

No.	Player	Position	Club
1	Rhys Shelly	Goalkeeper	Moycarkey–Borris
2	Robert Doyle	Right corner-back	Clonoulty–Rossmore
3	Eoghan Connolly	Full back	Cashel King Cormacs
4	Michael Breen	Left corner-back	Ballina
5	Craig Morgan	Right half-back	Kilruane MacDonagh's
6	Ronan Maher (c)	Centre back	Thurles Sarsfields
7	Bryan O'Mara	Left half-back	Holycross–Ballycahill
8	Willie Connors	Midfield	Kiladangan
9	Conor Stakelum	Midfield	Thurles Sarsfields
10	Jake Morris	Right half-forward	Nenagh Éire Óg
11	Andrew Ormond	Centre forward	JK Brackens
12	Sam O'Farrell	Left half-forward	Nenagh Éire Óg
13	Darragh McCarthy	Right corner-forward	Toomevara
14	John McGrath	Full forward	Loughmore–Castleiney
15	Jason Forde	Left corner-forward	Silvermines

No.	Player	Position	Club
16	Barry Hogan	Goalkeeper	Kiladangan
17	Joe Caesar	Wing-back	Holycross–Ballycahill
18	Séamus Kennedy	Wing-back	St Mary's
19	Paddy McCormack	Corner-forward	Borris–Ileigh
20	Brian McGrath	Full-back	Loughmore–Castleiney
21	Noel McGrath	Midfield	Loughmore–Castleiney
22	Peter McGarry	Midfield	St Mary's
23	Oisín O'Donoghue	Corner-forward	Cashel King Cormacs
24	Johnny Ryan	Wing-forward	Arravale Rovers
25	Darragh Stakelum	Midfield	Thurles Sarsfields
26	Alan Tynan	Forward	Roscrea

== 2025 National Hurling League ==
=== Summary ===
The National Hurling League started in late January with Tipperary's opening game was against Galway, managed by Micheál Donoghue on 26 January at Pearse Stadium. The match was shown live on TG4. Four players started and made their National League debuts in the match, Dylan Walsh, Darragh McCarthy, Sam O'Farrell, and Michael Corcoran. In a match played in icy cold conditions and in the aftermath of Storm Éowyn, Tipperary had a 1–13 to 0–9 lead at half time, the Tipperary goal coming from Darragh McCarthy from a penalty in the 11th minute after a foul on Dylan Walsh. McCarthy firing low to the right corner. In the 44th minute, Gearoid O’Connor got a second goal for Tipperary with a low shot along the ground to the net with Dylan Walsh getting a third seven minutes later with a low shot to the left corner from the right. Tipperary went on to win by 3–25 to 2-16.

A week later on 2 February in round 2 of the league, Tipperary played Wexford, managed by Keith Rossiter in Semple Stadium. Robert Doyle came into the team for his first start while Gavin O'Halloran and Josh Keller made their senior debut. Tipperary had a 0–12 to 0–8 lead at half time and went on to win the game on a 1–22 to 0–19 scoreline with the Tipperary goal coming from a penalty by Darragh McCarthy in the 59th minute.

Tipperary played Limerick, managed by John Kiely in round 3 of the league on 9 February at the Gaelic Grounds. The match was shown live on TG4. Shane Dowling returned to the Limerick panel and started as a goalkeeper. In front of a crowd of 11,213 they had a 1–13 to 0–15 lead at half-time, the goal coming from Sean Kenneally in the 25th minute with a volley to the top left corner from the right after a hand-pass from Darragh McCarthy to put Tipperary into a 1–9 to 0–11 lead. In the second-half Limerick responded and outscored Tipperary by 0–15 to 0-9 and went on to win by 0–30 to 1-23.

On Saturday 22 February, Tipperary played Cork managed by Pat Ryan in round 4 of the league at Semple Stadium in front of a crowd of 11,357. The match was shown live on RTÉ. In dry conditions, Tipperary had a 1–12 to 1–11 lead at half-time, the goal coming from Jake Morris in the 4th minute when he ran onto a pass from Alan Tynan before firing low to the left corner of the net from the right. In the 59th minute, substitute Dylan Walsh got a second goal for Tipperary with a low shot to the net past the advancing goalkeeper after a pass from Craig Morgan to make the score 2–20 to 1–17 with Tipperary going on to win by 2–22 to 1-21. Captain Ronan Maher was named as the man of the match.

On Sunday 9 March, Tipperary travelled to Nowlan Park to play a Kilkenny team managed by Derek Lyng in round 5 of the league in front of 9,563. The match was shown live on TG4. Tipperary had a 2–13 to 1–10 lead at half-time with goals from Graig Morgan in the 25th minute and Oisín O’Donoghue in the 33rd minute. Tipperary went on to win the game by 2–25 to 1–19 with 14 men as Alan Tynan was sent off in the 43rd minute, Kilkenny ended up with 12 men as David Blanchfield, Mikey Carey, and Jordan Molloy all being sent off.

In the final round of the league on 22 March, Tipperary played already relegated Clare, managed by Brian Lohan in Semple Stadium in front of 6,531 with a place in the league final already secured. Manager Liam Cahill made seven changes from the win over Kilkenny. Clare had a 0–10 to 0–8 lead at half-time but Tippeary went on to win by one point on a 0–22 to 1–18 scoreline after not leading until the fourth and final minute of added time.

In the league final on Sunday 6 April, Tipperary were defeated 3–24 to 0–23 by Cork at a sold-out Páirc Uí Chaoimh, it was Cork's first league title since 1998. The match was shown live on TG4 and played in sunny warm conditions in front of 43,243. The final was played in Cork because of a home and away agreement in league knock-out games. Tickets for the final went on general sale on 25 March and sold-out the same day. Cork had a 3–16 to 0–12 lead at half-time with goals coming from Alan Connolly, Darragh Fitzgibbon, and Ethan Twomey in the 22nd, 27th, and 35th minutes. Manager, Liam Cahill, admitted his side were well beaten by Cork in the final saying "Cork deserved winners on the day, to be honest. I suppose as the saying goes, goals win matches".

=== Results ===
26 January
15:45
Round 1

Galway	2–16 – 3–25	Tipperary
Rory Burke 0-4 (4fs), John Fleming and Declan McLoughlin 1-0 each, Conor Whelan and Oisín Lohan 0-3 each, Kevin Cooney 0-2 (1 sideline), Cianan Fahy, TJ Brennan, Tom Monaghan, and Liam Collins 0-1 each.	Report Rhys Shelly; Eoghan Connolly, Michael Breen, Michael Corcoran; Sam O’Farrell, Ronan Maher (c), Brian McGrath; Willie Connors, Craig Morgan; Alan Tynan, Andrew Ormond, Gearoid O’Connor; Darragh McCarthy, Jake Morris, Dylan Walsh; Subs: Robert Doyle for Corcoran (HT), Conor Bowe for Ormond (52), Seamus Kennedy for Doyle (53-55), Joe Fogarty for Tynan (55), Seamus Kennedy for McGrath (58), Conor Martin for O’Connor (65).	Darragh McCarthy 1-6 (1-0 pen, 5fs, 165), Dylan Walsh 1-3, Gearoid O’Connor 1-2, Willie Connors and Jake Morris 0-3 each, Sam O’Farrell, Craig Morgan, and Andy Ormond 0-2 each, Ronan Maher and Joe Fogarty 0-1 each.

Pearse Stadium
Referee: Colm Lyons (Cork).
2 February
15:45
Round 2

Tipperary	1–22 – 0–19	Wexford
Darragh McCarthy 1-7 (1-6 frees), Willie Connors 0-3, Jake Morris, Eoghan Connolly 0-2 each, Michael Breen, Gavin O’Halloran, Craig Morgan, Andrew Ormond, Jason Forde, John McGrath, Oisin O’Donoghue, Johnny Ryan 0-1 each.	Report Rhys Shelly; Robert Doyle, Eoghan Connolly, Michael Breen; Seamus Kennedy, Brian McGrath, Gavin O’Halloran; Craig Morgan, Willie Connors; Josh Keller, Jake Morris, Alan Tynan; Andrew Ormond, Jason Forde, Darragh McCarthy. Subs: Oisin O’Donoghue for Josh Keller (HT), John McGrath for Andrew Ormond (46), Conor Bowe for Jason Forde (52), Michael Corcoran for Seamus Kennedy (60), Johnny Ryan for Alan Tynan (65).	Cian Byrne 0-7 (6fs), Jack Redmond 0-3 (1f), Darren Codd, Mark Fanning (frees) 0-2 each, Corey Byrne Dunbar, Richie Lawlor, Conor Hearne, Connal Flood, Simon Roche 0-1 each.

Semple Stadium
Referee: Johnny Murphy (Limerick)
9 February
15:45
Round 3

Limerick	0–30 – 1–23	Tipperary
Diarmaid Byrnes 0-7 (3fs), Aidan O’Connor 0-5, Aaron Gillane 0-4 (3fs), David Reidy, Adam English, Paddy O’Donovan 0-3 each, Ethan Hurley, Cian Lynch 0-2 each; Eddie Stokes 0-1	Report Barry Hogan; Robert Doyle, Eoghan Connolly, Michael Breen; Seamus Kennedy, Ronan Maher (c), Bryan O’Mara; Willie Connors, Craig Morgan; Gearoid O’Connor, Jake Morris, Alan Tynan; Darragh Stakelum, Sean Kenneally, Darragh McCarthy; Subs: Brian McGrath for Kennedy (46); Conor Bowe for Stakelum (46); Michael Corcoran for Morgan (57); John McGrath for O’Connor (64); Johnny Ryan for Connors (64).	Darragh McCarthy 0-9 (9fs), Sean Kenneally 1-3, Jake Morris 0-4, Alan Tynan 0-3, Willie Connors, Michael Breen, Bryan O’Mara, Gearoid O’Connor 0-1 each.

Gaelic Grounds
Referee: Chris Mooney (Dublin).
22 February
19:30
Round 4

Tipperary	2–22 – 1–21	Cork
Darragh McCarthy 0-10 (5fs), Jake Morris 1-1, Jason Forde, Gearoid O’Connor 0-3 each, Dylan Walsh 1-0, Ronan Maher (free), Craig Morgan, Willie Connors, Alan Tynan, Oisin O’Donoghue 0-1 each.	Report Barry Hogan; Eoghan Connolly, Michael Breen, Robert Doyle; Joe Caesar, Ronan Maher (c), Bryan O’Mara; Craig Morgan, Willie Connors; Gearoid O’Connor, Alan Tynan, Jake Morris; Sean Kenneally, Jason Forde, Darragh McCarthy; Subs: Dylan Walsh for Kenneally (HT); Oisin O’Donoghue for Connors (55); Michael Corcoran for O’Mara (56); John McGrath for Forde (67); Noel McGrath for O’Connor (70).	Darragh Fitzgibbon 0-11 (6fs, 1 65), Patrick Horgan 0-3 (1f), Brian Hayes 1-0, Robbie O’Flynn 0-2, Micheal Mullins, Jack O’Connor, Cormac O’Brien, Shane Barrett, Diarmuid Healy 0-1 each.

Semple Stadium
Referee: Liam Gordon (Galway)
9 March
13:15
Round 5

Kilkenny	1–19 – 2–25	Tipperary
T.J. Reid (0-13, 11 frees, 2 65s); G. Dunne (1-1); M. Keoghan (0-4); D. Blanchfield (0-1).	Report B. Hogan; M. Breen, E. Connolly, R. Doyle; J. Caesar, R. Maher (c), B. O’Mara; C. Morgan, S. O’Farrell; O. O’Donoghue, A. Tynan, G. O’Connor; J. McGrath, J. Morris, D. McCarthy. Subs: A. Ormond for O. O’Donoghue (h-t); D. Walsh for J. McGrath (52); W. Connors for J. Caesar (57); N. McGrath for G. O’Connor (64); S. Kennedy for J. Morris (70).	D. McCarthy (0-12, 11 frees); S. O’Farrell (0-3); C. Morgan, O. O’Donoghue (1-0 each); J. McGrath, R. Maher, N. McGrath (0-2 each); A. Tynan, B. O’Mara, J. Caesar, W. Connors (0-1 each).

Nowlan Park
Referee: S. Stack (Dublin).
22 March
19:30
Round 6

Tipperary	0–22 – 1–18	Clare
Jason Forde 0-9 (7 frees, 1 65); Eoghan Connolly 0-3 (2 frees); Jake Morris, Darragh Stakelum 0-2 each; Ronan Maher, Brian McGrath, Noel McGrath, Conor Bowe, Dylan Walsh, Gearoid O’Connor 0-1 each	Report Barry Hogan; Robert Doyle, Michael Breen, Eoghan Connolly; Brian McGrath, Ronan Maher (c), Joe Caesar; Craig Morgan, Willie Connors; Seamus Kennedy, Noel McGrath, Conor Bowe; Jake Morris, Jason Forde, Dylan Walsh; Subs: Bryan O’Mara for B McGrath (46); Darragh Stakelum for Connors (46), Gearoid O’Connor for Kennedy (46); Andrew Ormond for Walsh (51); Sean Kenneally for Bowe (63).	Mark Rodgers 1-5 (0-4 frees); Tony Kelly 0-5 (2 frees); Aron Shanagher 0-3; Conor Cleary, David McInerney, Robin Mounsey, Sean Rynne, David Reidy 0-1 each.

Semple Stadium
Referee: Colm Lyons (Cork)
6 April
16:00
Final

Cork	3–24 – 0–23	Tipperary
Darragh Fitzgibbon 1-4, Patrick Horgan 0-7 (5f), Alan Connolly 1-2, Ethan Twomey 1-2, Diarmuid Healy, Shane Barrett, Tim O’Mahony all 0-2, Ciarán Joyce, Brian Hayes, Tommy O’Connell all 0-1.	Report Barry Hogan; Robert Doyle, Eoghan Connolly, Michael Breen; Joe Caesar, Ronan Maher (c), Bryan O’Mara; Craig Morgan, Willie Connors; Sam O’Farrell, Alan Tynan, Gearóid O’Connor; Darragh McCarthy, Jake Morris, Jason Forde; Subs: Darragh Stakelum for Willie Connors (23), Sean Kenneally for Joe Caesar (ht), Dylan Walsh for Gearoid O’Connor (44), Andrew Ormond for Darragh McCarthy (47), Seamus Kennedy for Alan Tynan (57)	Jason Forde 0-7 (2 65, 1f), Darragh McCarthy 0-4 (all frees), Jake Morris 0-3, Sean Kenneally, Sam O’Farrell, Darragh Stakelum all 0-2, Alan Tynan, Gearóid O’Connor, Andrew Ormond all 0-1.

Páirc Uí Chaoimh
Referee: S. Stack (Dublin).

== 2025 Munster Senior Hurling Championship ==
The Munster Senior hurling championship started in April 2025. Ticket prices for terrace and stand tickets increased by €5 from 2024.

=== Round 1 (v Limerick 20 April) ===
On Sunday 20 April Tipperary played Limerick, managed by John Kiely in their first match of the Munster Championship at Semple Stadium on Easter Sunday. The game was shown live on GAA+. Robert Doyle, Joe Caesar, Sam O’Farrell, and Darragh McCarthy all started and played their first championship match for Tipperary. The match was played in wet drizzly conditions in front of a crowd of 32,295. In the 18th minute, Adam English scored a goal for Limerick when he hit one handed along the ground through the legs of the advancing Tipperary goalkeeper Barry Hogan to put Limerick into a 1-6 to 0-7 lead.

Tipperary had a 0-16 to 1-13 lead at half-time before Limerick came back in the second half to score 1-3 in the first five minutes of the second-half with their goal coming two minutes into the second half from Shane O’Brien when he got past Michael Breen on the left and ran in to fire to the net. In the 41st minute John McGrath received a pass from Craig Morgan and scored a goal for Tipperary with a shot from the right to the left of the net. John McGrath got his second goal in the 63rd minute after a flowing five-pass move ended with a pass from Bryan O’Mara with McGrath finishing from the right to the left of the net to put Tipperary back in front by two points. Diarmaid Byrnes scored a point 13 seconds into injury-time to level the scores and Aaron Gillane then put Limerick back in front with a free. William O’Donoghue was then penalised for a throw ball with Darragh McCarthy scoring the resulting free from 45-yards out in the third minute of added time to level the scores for a final score of 2-23 to 2-23. The sides had been level 12 times during the game. Darragh McCarthy was also named as the man of the match.

=== Round 2 (v Cork 27 April) ===
On Sunday the 27 April, Tipperary played Cork, managed by Pat Ryan in their second match of the Munster Championship. The match was played in sunny conditions in front of a crowd of 42,231 and was televised live on RTÉ 2 as part of the Sunday Game presented by Joanne Cantwell with on site analysis by Liam Sheedy, Henry Shefflin and Dónal Óg Cusack. Tickets for the game cost €35 for the stand and €30 for the terrace. Darragh McCarthy was sent-off in the first minute of the match for striking Cork's Seán O’Donoghue and subsequently received a one match suspension. Noel McGrath, in his 17th season came on as a substitute in this match to play his 74th championship match for Tipperary, breaking the record he had previously shared with Brendan Cummins when he came on as a substitute against Limerick in round 1. Cork scored three goals in 17 minutes in the first half to lead by 10 points on a 3–13 to 0–12 scoreline. Cork got a fourth goal with 6 minutes to go and went on to win by 4–27 to 0-24.

=== Round 3 (v Clare 10 May) ===
On Saturday the 10 May, Tipperary played Clare, managed by Brian Lohan in round 3 of the Munster championship in Ennis. This was the 61st championship meeting between the counties with Tipperary having won 40 to Clare's 16, with four draws. Tipperary were looking for their first win in the Munster championship since 23 April 2023 when they beat Clare in the first round of the group stage. Since then have drawn three (v Waterford 2023, Limerick 2023 and 2025) and lost six (three v Cork in 2023–2024–2025, one v Limerick 2024, one v Waterford 2023, one v Clare 2024). Tickets for the game cost €35 for the stand and €30 for the terrace and was a sell-out in front of a crowd of 20,685. The match was played in hot sunny conditions and was shown live on GAA+.

Playing with the breeze in the first half, John McGrath got the opening goal for Tipperary after 6 minutes with a low shot from the right to the net, Andrew Ormond got a second goal after 12 minutes with a shot from the left bounced into the right corner. In the 17th minute John McGrath got his second goal of the match when he ran in from the right to shoot low to the left. In the 23 minute, Andrew Ormond then got his second with another low shot to the net form the right after the ball rebounded to him after a save by Eibhear Quilligan from a Jake Morris shot to put Tipperary into a 4-4 to 0-6 lead after 23 minutes, which was increased to 4-6 to 0-6 after 29 minutes. Clare pulled a goal back from Mark Rodgers to reduce the Tipperary lead at half-time to nine points on a 4-9 to 1-9 scoreline.

In the second half, Tony Kelly scored a penalty for Clare to reduce the Tipperary lead down to one point and after a free in the 63rd minute the sides were level. Tipperary responded and went on to score four of the next five points from John McGrath, Jason Forde, Eoghan Connolly and substitute Sean Kenneally and went on to win by 4-18 to 2-21. The win for Tipperary was a first Munster championship victory since the win against Clare on 23 April 23 2023, 748 days ago.

=== Round 4 (v Waterford 18 May) ===
On Sunday the 18 May, Tipperary played Waterford, managed by Peter Queally in the final group match of the Munster championship. The match was played in sunny conditions in front of a crowd of 28,758. It was televised live on RTÉ 2 as part of the Sunday Game presented by Joanne Cantwell with analysis from the Gaelic Grounds by Liam Sheedy, Anthony Daly and Dónal Óg Cusack. Match commentary was from Ger Canning. Tickets for the game cost €35 for the stand and €30 for the terrace. The match had a 10-minute start delay due to the large crowd. Alan Tynan missed the match with an injury, with Willie Connors coming into the starting team. Tipperary had a three-point lead at half-time on 0–16 to 1–10 scoreline and Waterford were level in the second half with 20 minutes to go before substitute Oisin O’Donoghue scored a goal for Tipperary with a low finish as they went on to wn the game on a 1–30 to 1–21 scoreline to progress to the All-Ireland series and recorded a first championship win against Waterford since 2019 and a first championship win at home since June 2019. Andrew Ormond was named as the man of the match.

=== Results ===
20 April
16:00
Round 1

Tipperary	2–23 – 2–23	Limerick
D McCarthy (0-8, 0-5 frees); J McGrath (2-1); E Connolly (0-4 frees), J Morris (0-4 each); B O’Mara, C Morgan, A Tynan, J Forde, S Kennedy, N McGrath (0-1 each)	Report; Highlights Barry Hogan; E Connolly, R Doyle, M Breen; J Caesar, R Maher (c), B O’Mara; C Morgan, S O’Farrell; A Tynan, J Morris, D Stakelum; J McGrath, J Forde, D McCarthy; Subs: N McGrath for Caesar (42); C Bowe for Forde (51); S Kennedy for D Stakelum (52); C Stakelum for Tynan (68); S Kenneally for J McGrath (70).	A Gillane (0-7, 0-4 frees); S O’Brien (1-4); A English (1-2); D Byrnes (0-3, 0-2 frees); K Hayes (0-2); C Coughlan, B Nash, C Lynch, G Hegarty, T Morrissey (0-1 each).

Semple Stadium, Thurles
Referee: T Walsh (Waterford)
27 April
16:00
Round 2

Cork	4–27 – 0–24	Tipperary
Patrick Horgan 1-9 (6fs), Declan Dalton 1-6 (2fs), Séamus Harnedy 0-5, Tim O’Mahony, Alan Connolly 1-0 each, Darragh Fitzgibbon, Brian Hayes, Robbie O’Flynn 0-2 each, Tommy O’Connell 0-1	Report; Highlights Barry Hogan; Eoghan Connolly, Robert Doyle, Michael Breen; Sam O’Farrell, Ronan Maher (c), Bryan O’Mara; Craig Morgan, Alan Tynan; Conor Bowe, Jake Morris, Darragh Stakelum; Darragh McCarthy, John McGrath, Jason Forde; Subs: Andrew Ormond for Bowe (42), Noel McGrath for Stakelum (42), Séamus Kennedy for Tynan (46), Gearóid O’Connor for J McGrath (51), Willie Connors for O’Farrell (67).	Jason Forde 0-15 (12fs), Jake Morris 0-3, Willie Connors 0-2, Eoghan Connolly, Craig Morgan, Darragh Stakelum, Andrew Ormond 0-1 each.

Páirc Uí Chaoimh
Referee: Johnny Murphy (Limerick)
10 May
18:00
Round 3

Clare	2–21 – 4–18	Tipperary
M Rodgers (1-13, 0-13 frees); T Kelly (1-1, 1-0 pen, 0-1 free); S Rynne (0-3); R Taylor (0-2); C Malone, P Duggan (0-1 each).	Report; Highlights R Shelly; M Breen, B O’Mara, E Connolly; R Maher (c), C Morgan, R Doyle; S O’Farrell, A Tynan; C Stakelum, A Ormond, N McGrath; J Forde, J McGrath, J Morris; Sub: O O’Donoghue for Stakelum (47); S Kennedy for Maher (55-59, temporary); W Connors for N McGrath (58); S Kennedy for O’Farrell (62); D Stakelum for Tynan (63); S Kenneally for Forde (66).	John McGrath (2-3); J Forde (0-8, 0-6 frees, 0-1 ‘65); A Ormond (2-1); E Connolly (0-3, 0-2 frees); J Morris (0-2); S Kenneally (0-1).

Cusack Park
Referee: J Owens (Wexford).
18 May
14:00
Round 4

Tipperary	1–30 – 1–21	Waterford
Darragh McCarthy 0-11 (11fs), Oisín O’Donoghue 1-1, Jake Morris 0-4, Eoghan Connolly (2fs), Andrew Ormond, Jason Forde (2s/l) 0-3 each, John McGrath 0-2, Sam O’Farrell, Noel McGrath, Seán Kenneally 0-1 each.	Report; Highlights Rhys Shelly; Robert Doyle, Michael Breen, Eoghan Connolly; Bryan O’Mara, Craig Morgan, Ronan Maher (c); Sam O’Farrell, Willie Connors; Conor Stakelum, Andrew Ormond, Jake Morris; Darragh McCarthy, John McGrath, Jason Forde; Subs: Darragh Stakelum for Connors (47-52, temp), Noel McGrath for C Stakelum (51), D Stakelum for O’Farrell (52), Seán Kenneally for J McGrath (57), Oisín O’Donoghue for Forde (68), Séamus Kennedy for Morgan (70).	Stephen Bennett 1-9 (7fs), Jamie Barron 0-4, Michael Kiely 0-2, Paddy Leavey, Darragh Lyons (s/l), Kevin Mahony, Dessie Hutchinson, Patrick Fitzgerald, Seán Walsh 0-1 each.

Semple Stadium, Thurles
Referee: Seán Stack (Dublin)

== 2025 All-Ireland Senior Hurling Championship ==
After finishing in third place in the Munster Championship, Tipperary went into the All-Ireland preliminarily quarter-finals.

=== All-Ireland Championship Preliminary Quarter-final (v Laois 14 June ) ===
On Saturday 14 June, Tipperary played Joe McDonagh Cup runners-up Laois managed by Tommy Fitzgerald in the All-Ireland preliminary quarter-final. The match was televised live on GAA+. The match was played in rainy conditions in front of a crowd of 6,640. Tipperay played in an all navy strip. Tipperary were 1/100 to win with the bookies and had a 1–18 to 0–12 lead at half-time before going on to win by 23 points and set up a quarter-final against Galway.

14 June
13:45
Preliminary Quarter-final

Laois	0-18 – 3–32	Tipperary
Tomás Keyes 0-9 (6fs), Paddy Purcell 0-4, James Keyes 0-1, Pádraig Delaney 0-1, Jordan Walshe 0-1, Donnacha Hartnett 0-1, Aaron Dunphy 0-1.	Report; Highlights Rhys Shelly; Michael Breen, Bryan O’Mara, Robert Doyle; Craig Morgan, Ronan Maher (c), Séamus Kennedy; Willie Connors, Joe Caesar; Alan Tynan, Andrew Ormond, Sam O’Farrell; Jason Forde, John McGrath, Darragh McCarthy; Subs: Johnny Ryan for Doyle (half-time), Oisín O’Donoghue for Ormond (47), Peter McGarry for Maher (47), Brian McGrath for Morgan (54), Joe Fogarty for McCarthy (55).	Jason Forde 2-5 (2fs), Darragh McCarthy 0-9 (6fs, 1 65), Willie Connors 0-5, Sam O’Farrell 1-1, John McGrath 0-3, Andrew Ormond 0-3, Alan Tynan 0-1, Robert Doyle 0-1, Joe Caesar 0-1, Oisín O’Donoghue 0-1, Joe Fogarty 0-1, Peter McGarry 0-1.

O'Moore Park
Referee: Chris Mooney (Dublin)

=== All-Ireland Championship Quarter-final (v Galway 21 June ) ===
On Saturday 21 June Tipperary played Galway, managed by Micheál Donoghue in the All-Ireland quarter-final at the Gaelic Grounds in Limerick. It was the 17th meeting between the teams in the championship since the 1987 All-Ireland Semi-final. Galway were coming into the match after losing the 2025 Leinster Senior Hurling Championship final to Kilkenny by eight points on 8 June. The match was televised live on RTÉ 2 as part of the Sunday Game presented by Joanne Cantwell with analysis by Joe Canning, Dónal Óg Cusack and John Conlon. Commentary on the game was provided by Marty Morrissey alongside Michael Duignan. Tickets for the game cost €40 for the stand and €35 for the terrace.

The match was played in front of a crowd of 16,404 in mostly dry conditions with occasional showers. Peter McGarry made his first start for Tipperary after coming on as a substitute the previous week against Laois. Tipperary had a 0–16 to 0–11 lead at half-time after playing with the wind into the city end. Five minutes into the second half, Galway scored a goal with Colm Molloy scoring with a low finish to the net after cutting in from the left to reduce Tipperary's lead to two points. In the 59th minute Tipperary substitute Oisín O’Donoghue scored a goal with a low shot to the right corner after wrong footing the Galway goalkeeper after a pass from Noel McGrath, which put Tipperary into a 12-point lead. Galway scored another goal in the last seconds of the match with a shot from Declan McLaughlin which Tipperary goalkeeper Rhys Shelly got a hand to. Tipperary went on to win the game by eight points on a 1–28 to 2–17 scoreline to reach the All-Ireland semi-finals and Croke park for the first time since 2019. Andrew Ormond was named as the man of the match with 0-5 from play.

21 June
18:15
Quarter-final

Galway	2-17 – 1–28	Tipperary
Cathal Mannion 0-13 (9fs, 2 65s), Colm Molloy and Declan McLoughlin 1-0 each, Tom Monaghan 0-2, Conor Cooney and Conor Whelan 0-1 each	Report; Highlights Rhys Shelly; Robert Doyle, Bryan O'Mara, Michael Breen; Craig Morgan, Eoghan Connolly, Ronan Maher (c); Willie Connors, Peter McGarry; Sam O'Farrell, Jake Morris, Andrew Ormond; John McGrath, Jason Forde, Darragh McCarthy; Subs: Darragh Stakelum for McGarry (HT), Noel McGrath for John McGrath (48), Oisín O'Donoghue for McCarthy (52), Conor Stakelum for O'Farrell (59), Séamus Kennedy for Connors (66).	Jason Forde 0-7 (1f, 2 sidelines), Jake Morris and Andrew Ormond 0-5 each, Oisín O'Donoghue 1-0, John McGrath and Darragh McCarthy (3fs) 0-3 each, Darragh Stakelum 0-2, Sam O'Farrell, Willie Connors, and Noel McGrath 0-1 each.

Gaelic Grounds
Referee: Seán Stack (Dublin).

=== All-Ireland Championship Semi-final (v Kilkenny 6 July ) ===
On Sunday 6 July, Tipperary played Kilkenny managed by Derek Lyng in the All-Ireland semi-final in Croke Park. This was Tipperary's first match in Croke Park since the 2019 All-Ireland final, with fifteen of Tipperary's panel having never played in Croke Park. The match was televised live on RTÉ 2 as part of the Sunday Game presented by Joanne Cantwell with on pitch analysis from Ursula Jacob, Liam Sheedy and Jackie Tyrrell. Commentary was from Ger Canning and Michael Duignan.

Tickets for the game cost €60 for the stand and €40 for the terrace. The Tipperary team was announced on 4 July and was unchanged from the quarter-final win against Galway.

The match was played in mostly dry conditions with occasional showers in front of 60,738. Tipperary made one change to their starting team with Conor Stakelum replacing Peter McGarry in midfield. Eight of the first nine scores were from Kilkenny, with the first score from Tipperary a goal from John McGrath in the 8th minute with a powerful shot to the right corner of the net from the left at the canal end of the ground. After 13 minutes Kilkenny had a 0–8 to 1–10 lead with Tipperry taking time to settle into the match. Darragh McCarthy got a second goal for Tipperary with a low finish to the right from the left after running in on goal, with Jason Forde getting a third goal in the 25th minute after a hand passed assist from McCarthy when he scooped the ball over the advancing goalkeeper from the left to make it 3–6 to 0-11. Tipperary had a 3–11 to 0–16 lead at half-time. In the 58th minute McCarthy was sent off for a second yellow card after a foul with the hurley on Kilkenny goalkeepr Eoin Murphy. Tipperay came form behind with 14 men and with the scores level, substitute Oisín O'Donoghue scored a fourth goal in the final minute of normal time with a powerful shot from the right from distance to the top left corner of the net to put Tipperary into a 3-point lead. Kilkenny chasing a goal were denied when Robert Doyle made a goal-line save with Tipperary going on to win by three and qualify for the 2025 All-Ireland final.

It later emerged that the scoreboard inside Croke park and also displayed by RTÉ had Tipperary in front by 3 points when in fact it was only 2 points as a point by Noel McGrath from the right had in fact gone wide and was waved wide by the umpire. Later that evening the GAA corrected the official scoreline as Tipperary 4-20 Kilkenny 0–30 with the referee James Owens having the correct score during the game.

6 July
16:00
Semi-final

Kilkenny	0-30 – 4–20	Tipperary
TJ Reid 0-11 (8fs, 1 65), Martin Keoghan 0-6, Jordan Molloy 0-4, Cian Kenny, Adrian Mullen, Billy Ryan, and Eoin Cody 0-2 each, John Donnelly 0-1	Report; Highlights Rhys Shelly; Michael Breen, Ronan Maher (c), Robert Doyle; Bryan O'Mara, Eoghan Connolly, Craig Morgan; Willie Connors, Conor Stakelum; Jake Morris, Andrew Ormond, Sam O'Farrell; Darragh McCarthy, John McGrath, Jason Forde; Subs: Alan Tynan for Ormond (28-31 mins), Noel McGrath for J McGrath (50), Alan Tynan for O'Farrell (53), Darragh Stakelum for Connors (57), Oisín O'Donoghue for C Stakelum (63), Seán Kenneally for Ormond (70+1).	Jason Forde 1-5 (4fs), John McGrath and Darragh McCarthy (2fs) 1-2 each, Jake Morris 0-4, Oisín O'Donoghue 1-0, Eoghan Connolly and Conor Stakelum 0-3 each, Sam O'Farrell 0-1

Croke Park
Referee: James Owens (Wexford).

=== All-Ireland Championship Final (v Cork 20 July ) ===
On Sunday 20 July, Tipperary played Cork managed by Pat Ryan in the All-Ireland final in Croke Park.

==== Pre-match ====
The match was televised nationally on RTÉ2 as part of The Sunday Game live programme, presented by Joanne Cantwell from the pitch at Croke Park with analysis by Anthony Daly, Dónal Óg Cusack and Liam Sheedy. Commentary on the game was provided by Marty Morrissey alongside Michael Duignan. The game was also televised on BBC Two and presented by Sarah Mulkerrins. Tickets for the match were distributed by the clubs with no public sale and priced at €100 for the stands and €55 for the terrace, the match programme cost €8.

On 18 July the Tipperary team was named showing with no changes to the starting line-up from the semi-final win over Kilkenny. There is one change to the panel with Under-20's forward Paddy McCormack replacing Seán Kenneally.

Jacqui Hurley and Des Cahill presented Up for the Match on 19 July on RTÉ One with guests including Shane McGrath, Tomás Mulcahy and Joe Hayes and a live visit to Loughmore–Castleiney presented by Marty Morrissey.

Prior to the start of the match and as per tradition, the two teams lined up in front of the Hogan stand to be presented to the President of Ireland, Michael D. Higgins by the two team captains, Ronan Maher for Tipperary and Robert Downey for Cork.

==== Match ====
Cork were strong favourites to win the match and had a six-point lead at half time. However, they collapsed in the second half, with Tipperary outscoring them 3–14 to 0–2 to win by fifteen points.

===== First Half =====
The match was played in dry conditions with a slight breeze into the canal end in front of a sell-out crowd of 82,331. Cork playing with the light breeze in the first half opened the scoring with a point from Diarmuid Healy. Bryan O'Mara was playing as an extra man sweeper for Tipperary in the full back line with Willie Connors dropping in at wing-back and Sam O'Farrell also moving into midfield. After 12 minutes, Cork had a 0–4 to 0–3 lead with five wides from Tipperary. In the 20th minute, Eoghan Connolly found himself out on the left and went for goal with a low effort thar was just wide to the right at the hill 16 end.

In the 34th minute, Jason Forde scored a goal with a flick to the net after a high ball into the square from Eoghan Connolly which was disallowed when the referee called a square ball. In the 2nd of the two minutes of added time, Shane Barrett scored a goal for Cork after running in from the left before shooting low to the right corner to put Cork into a six-point lead at half time on a 1–16 to 0–13 scoreline.

===== Second Half =====
In the first minute Patrick Horgan sent a free wide for Cork at the hill 16 end. A minute later Andrew Ormond scored a point and got another point in the 41st minute to narrow the gap to four. Darragh McCarthy then added another point and a free to put one point between the sides. In the 45th minute, Tipperary scored a goal, Cork goalkeeper Patrick Collins batted out a high ball which was picked up by John McGrath before he slotted into the net to put Tipperary into a two-point lead. In the 53rd minute, Tipperary are awarded a penalty when John McGrath was pulled down by Eoin Downey who was already on a yellow and received a red card. Darragh McCarthy took the penalty and scored with a powerful shot to the left to put seven points between the sides.

In the 60th minute Tipperary got a third goal and a second for John McGrath when he flicked the ball right handed to the net past the advancing goalkeeper after a high ball into the square from Eoghan Connolly, putting twelve points between the sides. In the 69th minute, Tipperary goalkeeper Rhys Shelly scored a point from play to increase the lead to thirteen points, it was the first ever point scored by a goalkeeper from open play in an All-Ireland final. In added time Cork were awarded a penalty when Brian Hayes was fouled, Rhys Shelley dived to his right to save the penalty from Conor Lehane. Darragh McCarthy then scored from a free before passing to Noel McGrath to get the final point of the game with Tipperary winning by 3–27 to 1-18. They won the second half by 21 points with Cork only scoring two points.

===== Details =====
RTÉ 2
BBC

July 20, 2025
15:35 IST (UTC+01:00)
Final

Report 1
Report 2
Highlights

Cork	1-18 (21) – (36) 3-27	Tipperary
(HT: 1-16 – 0-13)
Gls: Shane Barrett 1 Pts: Shane Barrett 4, Patrick Horgan 4 (3f), Diarmuid Healy 3, Darragh Fitzgibbon 2, Brian Hayes 1, Alan Connolly 1, Declan Dalton 1f, Niall O'Leary 1, Seamus Harnedy 1		Gls: John McGrath 2, Darragh McCarthy 1(pen); Pts: Darragh McCarthy 13 (9fs), John McGrath 2, Jake Morris 2, Jason Forde 2, Andrew Ormond 2, Eoghan Connolly 1, Robert Doyle 1, Willie Connors 1, Conor Stakelum 1, Rhys Shelly 1, Noel McGrath 1

Croke Park, Dublin
Referee: Liam Gordon (Galway)
Attendance: 82,331
Standby: Seán Stack (Dublin)
Linesman: Thomas Walsh (Waterford)
Sideline: Colm McDonald (Antrim)
Umpires: Damien Gibbons, Alan McClearn, John Larkin, Ollie Reilly (all Killimor)

Cork	Tipperary

GK	1	Patrick Collins
FB	2	Niall O'Leary
FB	3	Eoin Downey	(yellow card) 31' (yellow-red card) 54'
FB	4	Seán O'Donoghue
HB	5	Ciarán Joyce
HB	6	Robert Downey (c)	(yellow card) 42'
HB	7	Mark Coleman
MF	8	Tim O'Mahony		(substituted off) 67'
MF	9	Darragh Fitzgibbon
HF	10	Diarmuid Healy		(substituted off) 56'
HF	11	Shane Barrett
HF	12	Declan Dalton		(substituted off) 44'
FF	13	Patrick Horgan		(substituted off) 58'
FF	14	Alan Connolly	(yellow card) 47'	(substituted off) 64'
FF	15	Brian Hayes
Substitutes:
	16	Bríon Saunderson
	17	Damien Cahalane		(substituted on) 56'
	18	Ger Millerick
	19	Cormac O'Brien
	20	Tommy O'Connell		(substituted on) 67'
	21	Luke Meade
	22	Brian Roche
	23	Séamus Harnedy		(substituted on) 44'
	24	Robbie O'Flynn
	25	Conor Lehane		(substituted on) 58'
	26	Shane Kingston		(substituted on) 64'
Manager:
Pat Ryan

GK	1	Rhys Shelly
FB	2	Robert Doyle	(yellow card) 47'
FB	3	Eoghan Connolly
FB	4	Michael Breen
HB	5	Craig Morgan		(substituted off) 56'
HB	6	Ronan Maher (c)
HB	7	Bryan O'Mara		(substituted off) 50'
MF	8	Willie Connors	(yellow card) 45'
MF	9	Conor Stakelum		(substituted off) 65'
HF	10	Jake Morris		(substituted off) 66'
HF	11	Andrew Ormond
HF	12	Sam O'Farrell		(substituted off) 59'
FF	13	Darragh McCarthy
FF	14	John McGrath
FF	15	Jason Forde
Substitutes:
	16	Barry Hogan
	17	Joe Caesar
	18	Séamus Kennedy		(substituted on) 50'
	19	Paddy McCormack
	20	Brian McGrath
	21	Noel McGrath		(substituted on) 59'
	22	Peter McGarry
	23	Oisín O'Donoghue		(substituted on) 66'
	24	Johnny Ryan
	25	Darragh Stakelum		(substituted on) 65'
	26	Alan Tynan		(substituted on) 56'
Manager:
Liam Cahill

==== Trophy presentation ====
Tipperay captain Ronan Maher accepted the Liam MacCarthy Cup from GAA president Jarlath Burns in the Hogan Stand and the team then did a victory lap around Croke Park with the trophy. In his speech, Maher paid tribute to former teammate Dillon Quirke, who died in 2022.

==== Reaction ====
Tipperary manager Liam Cahill never doubted his players saying "The honesty of that group of players – I never doubted them. I know we were all a little bit sensitive after last year with what happened, and some of the criticism was probably deserved at times, but I knew the quality of these men, My mother has probably swallowed her rosary beads and my father has probably the cows milked three times with nervousness. I'm so thrilled for everybody."

Cork manager Pat Ryan speaking after the game felt that Tipperary deserved the win saying "Look, credit to Tipperary. They came out and worked really, really hard. We were in a good position at half-time, but we got blown away in the second half.”

Former Cork player and RTÉ analyst Donal Óg Cusack highlighted Cork's failure to get to deal with Bryan O'Mara's role as sweeper saying "“Everyone from a Cork point of view is in a state of shock, really, with that second half, it's very hard to explain, I think what will frustrate Cork the most is that it was an out-and-out sweeper that was set up, and everyone's used to playing sweepers now".

Tipperary player Eoghan Connolly spoke of the embarrassment after last year's failure to win a championship game and the need to put that right saying "Last year, you were afraid to walk down the town to get a coffee, we believed from the get-go when we met in late November or December that we were capable of fixing it".

Tipperary player John McGrath speaking a month after the final said what happened in the second half was beyond wildest dreams "But the manner in which we won it, I don't think anyone in their wildest dreams would have come up with that scenario. There certainly was an element of shock. I knew we were relatively well up but to actually see the final score, it was kinda hard to believe that that had just happened."

Highlights of the final were shown on The Sunday Game programme which aired at 9:30pm that night on RTÉ2 and was presented by Jacqui Hurley with match analysis from Jackie Tyrrell, Brendan Cummins, Dónal Óg Cusack, Joe Canning, Henry Shefflin, and Ursula Jacob. On the man of the match award shortlist were captain Ronan Maher, John McGrath and Darragh McCarthy with Ronan Maher winning the award which was presented by GAA president Jarlath Burns at the post match Tipperary function at the Grand Hotel in Malahide in Dublin. Tipperary manager Liam Cahill and selector Michael Bevans were interviewed by Joanne Cantwell, with Noel and John McGrath also interviewd by Marty Morrissey at the hotel function.

The match drew an average TV audience of 980,000 viewers on RTÉ2 and peaked at 1,119,000 towards the end of the game.

==== Homecoming ====
Members of the Tipperary team and management visited Crumlin Children's Hospital on the morning after the game and also stopped off at the Palace Bar in Dublin before arriving back in Thurles at a reception at Semple Stadium. 25-T-LIAM number plates were issued for sale to celebrate the win with the proceeds going to the team holiday.

A temporary stage was set up along the side-line of the new stand for the event with the crowd on the pitch.The team arrived at 8:15pm with approximately 45,000 in attendance to greet them on stage in Thurles. Manager Liam Cahill and captain Ronan Maher carried the cup onto the stage together followed by the rest of the panel and back-room team. Entertainment was provided by Seskin Lane, Callini Lua, Acquiesce, Una Healy, and The 2 Johnnies. Ronan Maher was also added to the Thurles Sarsfields wall of winners mural outside Semple Stadium for players who have captained Tipperary to All-Ireland Senior hurling titles. In Cork it was agreed by the team and management that there would be no homecoming event held.

In November, the Tipperary senior team, along with wives and girlfriends flew to South Africa for the team holiday in Cape Town. The trip cost €373,300.

On 30 November, the winning Tipperary senior hurlers were presented with their All-Ireland medals at a function at the Abbey Court Hotel in Nenagh.

== Awards ==
Sunday Game Team of the Year

The Sunday Game team of the year was picked 20 July on the night of the All-Irealand final. Rhys Shelly, Robert Doyle, Eoghan Connolly, Ronan Maher, Jake Morris, Andrew Ormond, and John McGrath were all named in the team. The team was picked by a panel consisting of Jackie Tyrrell, Brendan Cummins, Dónal Óg Cusack, Joe Canning, Henry Shefflin, and Ursula Jacob and they also chose Jake Morris as the Sunday game player of the year.

The PwC All-Star Awards

The nominations for the PwC All-Stars were announced on 24 September after GAA correspondents from print, TV, radio and digital media listed the 45 nominees, which is split across three goalkeepers, 18 defenders, six midfielders and 18 forwards. Tipperary received thirteen nominations, with just Conor Stakelum and Sam O'Farrell from the All-Ireland final starting team missing out on a nomination. Of Tipperary's thirteen nominations, only two had previously won All Star award, Ronan Maher in 2016 and 2019, and John McGrath in 2019. Eight of them had never previously been nominated for an award, Michael Breen, Jason Forde and Jake Morris had previously been nominated.

John McGrath and Jake Morris were nominated for the Hurler of the Year. Darragh McCarthy and Robert Doyle were also nominated for the Young Hurler of the Year. On 6 November, it was announced that Tipperary had won seven places on the All-Stars team. Rhys Shelly, Robert Doyle, Eoghan Connolly, Ronan Maher, Jake Morris, Andrew Ormond and John McGrath all won awards with captain Ronan Maher and John McGrath the only previous winners. The awards were presented at a black-tie ceremony at the RDS on 7 November which was shown live on RTÉ. At the awards ceremony, Darragh McCarthy was named as the Young Hurler of the Year, and John McGrath was awarded the Hurler of the Year.
