= Liam Cahill =

Irish hurler and manager

Personal information
- Native name: Liam Ó Cathail (Irish)
- Born: 13 October 1977 (age 49) Ballingarry, County Tipperary, Ireland
- Height: 5 ft 9 in (175 cm)

Sport
- Sport: Hurling
- Position: Right corner-forward
Clubs
- Years: Club
- Ballingarry; Thurles Sarsfields
Club titles
- Tipperary titles: 1
Inter-county*
Years	County	Apps (scores)
1996–2007	Tipperary	25 (5-25)
Inter-county titles
- Munster titles: 1
- All-Irelands: 1
- NHL: 2
- All Stars: 1
- *Inter County team apps and scores correct as of 16:53, 4 September 2016.

Liam Cahill (born 13 October 1977) is an Irish hurling manager, former selector and player. He has been manager of the Tipperary county team since 18 July 2022.

== Playing career ==
=== College ===
Cahill first came to prominence as a hurler with Scoil Ruáin in Killenaule. In 1992 he was a member of the school's junior hurling team that won the All-Ireland Vocational Championship after a 3-04 to 2-04 defeat of St Colman’s Vocational School from Gort.

=== Club ===
Cahill joined the Ballingarry club at a young age and played in all grades at juvenile and underage levels. He enjoyed championship success in the minor grade, winning back-to-back championship medals in 1994 and 1995. As a member of the Ballingarry senior hurling team, Cahill won South Tipperary Championship medals in 1996, 1998 and 2001. Cahill transferred to the Thurles Sarsfields club in 2007.

On 18 October 2009, Cahill was at right wing-back when Thurles Sarsfields defeated Drom-Inch by 0-14 to 0-05 to win the Tipperary Senior Championship.

=== Inter-county ===
==== Minor and under-21 ====
Cahill first played at inter-county level when he joined the Tipperary minor hurling team as a fifteen-year old. After scoring 1-04 on his debut against Limerick on 7 April 1993, he later won a Munster Championship medal following a 1-12 to 1-09 defeat of Cork in the final.

After surrendering the championship title the following year, Cahill was appointed captain of the team for Tipperary's unsuccessful championship campaign in 1995.

Cahill subsequently joined the Tipperary under-21 team. After making his first appearance in that grade on 19 June 1996 in a 0-16 to 0-10 defeat of Limerick, he played for three unsuccessful seasons.

==== Senior ====
Cahill made his senior debut for Tipperary on 18 February 1996, replacing Aidan Ryan in a National Hurling League defeat of Cork at Páirc Uí Rinn. On 2 June 1996, he made his first Munster Championship appearance and scored 1-02 in a three-point defeat of Waterford. Cahill finished the championship with 3-10 and was named in the right corner-forward position on the All-Star team.

On 14 September 1997, Cahill came on as a substitute for Michael Cleary in Tipperary's 0-20 to 2-13 All-Ireland final defeat by Clare at Croke Park.

On 16 May 1999, Cahill collected his first silverware at senior level when he won a National Hurling League medal after a 1-14 to 1-10 defeat of Galway in the final.

On 6 May 2001, Cahill won a second National League medal in three years. He was held scoreless and substituted in the 52nd minute in the 1-19 to 0-17 defeat of Clare. Later that season he won a Munster Championship medal after scoring a point in Tipperary's 2-16 to 1-17 defeat of Limerick in the final. On 9 September 2001, Cahill was a non-playing substitute when Tipperary won the All-Ireland title for the first time in a decade after a 2-18 to 2-15 defeat of Galway in the final.

After being a regular player for Tipperary during the 2003 National League, Cahill subsequently fell out of favour with the management after a poor performance against Clare in the Munster Championship. He left the panel in July 2003.

Cahill returned to the Tipperary senior panel under Babs Keating during the 2007 National League. Later that season he made his first championship start in four years in a 2-17 to 2-13 defeat of Offaly. Cahill left the panel after Tipperary's exit from the championship.

== Management and coaching career ==
=== Tipperary ===
==== Minor ====
Cahill first became involved in inter-county management as a selector on Declan Ryan's Tipperary minor hurling management team in 2007. After helping guide the team to the Munster Championship title after a defeat of Cork, Tipperary later beat Cork for a second time that season in the subsequent All-Ireland final.

Cahill's second and final season as a selector with the Tipperary minor team ended with defeats by Cork and Kilkenny.

In September 2013, Cahill returned to inter-county management when he was appointed manager of the Tipperary minor team. His first season in charge ended with a 1-23 to 0-12 defeat by Clare in the Munster Championship.

Cahill's second season as manager saw him guide Tipperary to the Munster Championship title after a three-point defeat of Limerick. On 6 September 2015, Tipperary suffered a 4-13 to 1-16 defeat by Galway in the All-Ireland final.

Cahill remained as manager of the team for a third season in 2016 and guided the team to a second successive Munster Championship title after a 1-24 o 0-10 defeat of Limerick. On 4 September 2016, Cahill's minor team won the All-Ireland title after a 1-21 to 0-17 defeat of Limerick in the final.

Cahill's four-year tenure as Tipperary minor hurling manager ended with a three-point defeat by Cork in 2017.

==== Under-21 and under-20 ====
Cahill was appointed manager of the Tipperary under-21 hurling team in November 2017. After being heavily defeated by Cork in the Munster Championship final, Cahill guided Tipperary to an All-Ireland final appearance against the same opposition on 26 August 2018. An injury-time goal from Conor Stakelum secured a 3-13 to 1-16 victory.

As a result of the under-21 success, Cahill refused to rule himself out of the running for the vacant Tipperary senior hurling manager post stating: "The Tipp senior job never really came into my mind to be honest, but I’m absolutely honoured to be linked to it. We'll see." In spite of this, he remained with the underage set-up, becoming the Tipperary under-20 manager. On 23 July 2019, Cahill guided Tipperary to the inaugural Munster Championship title following a 3-15 to 2-17 defeat of Cork in the final. Both sides met again in the All-Ireland final on 24 August 2019, with Tipperary recording a 5-17 to 1-18 victory and a third successive championship defeat of Cork.

=== Waterford ===
Cahill was ratified as manager of the Waterford senior hurling team on 30 September 2019. His first major action as manager saw him drop Noel Connors and Maurice Shanahan from the panel. This was later followed by the retirement of Michael "Brick" Walsh. In August 2021, Cahill confirmed that he would be staying on as manager of the Waterford senior team for at least another year, after turning down the opportunity to manage the Tipperary hurling team.

On 2 April 2022, Waterford won the 2022 National Hurling League after a 4-20 to 1-23 win against Cork in the final.

On 15 July 2022, Cahill stepped down as Waterford manager after three years in charge, after opting against taking a fourth year.

=== Tipperary ===
==== 2023 Season ====
On 18 July 2022, Cahill was named as the new manager of the Tipperary county hurling team on a three year term, replacing Colm Bonnar. In 2023 he was assisted by coach Michael Bevans and selectors Pádraic Maher, Declan Laffan and TJ Ryan.

==== 2024 Season ====
In the 2024 Munster Senior Hurling Championship, Tipperary lost by eighteen points to Limerick in round 1 before drawing with Waterford a week later in Walsh Park. In round 3 they lost to Cork by eighteen points on a 4-30 to 1-21 scoreline which eliminated Tipperary from the Munster and All-Ireland Championships. In their final game on 26 May they lost to Clare by three points.

==== 2025 Season ====
On 20 July in the 2025 All-Ireland final, Tipperary defeated Cork by 3-27 to 1-19 and claim a 29th All-Ireland title.

==== 2026 Season ====
In the 2026 Munster Senior Hurling Championship, Tipperary lost by eighteen points to Cork in round 1 before drawing with Waterford in Walsh Park in round 2. In round 3 on 16 May, they lost to Clare by eleven points on a 1-25 to 0-17 scoreline. Elimination from the Munster and All-Ireland Championships was confirmed the next day when Limerick defeated Waterford.

In July 2026, Cahill was ratified as Tipperary senior hurling manager for another three years up to the end of the 2029 season.

== Personal life ==
Cahill is married to Eimear, who is the daughter of former Tipperary player and manager Len Gaynor and they have three children.

== Career statistics ==
Team	Year	National League			Munster		All-Ireland		Total	
Team	Year	Division	Apps	Score	Apps	Score	Apps	Score	Apps	Score
Tipperary	1995-96	Division 1	5	0-02	4	3-10	—		9	3-12
Tipperary	1997	Division 1	8	2-13	2	0-02	3	1-02	13	3-17
Tipperary	1998	Division 1A	5	2-06	1	0-03	—		6	2-09
Tipperary	1999	Division 1B	8	2-14	3	1-05	—		11	3-19
Tipperary	2000	Division 1B	4	2-04	3	0-01	1	0-00	8	2-05
Tipperary	2001	Division 1B	8	1-22	1	0-01	1	0-00	10	1-23
Tipperary	2002	Division 1B	6	1-08	0	0-00	1	0-00	7	1-08
Tipperary	2003	Division 1B	8	1-06	1	0-01	1	0-00	10	1-07
Tipperary	2004	Division 1B	—		—		—		—	
Tipperary	2005	Division 1B	—		—		—		—	
Tipperary	2006	Division 1B	—		—		—		—	
Tipperary	2007	Division 1B	0	0-00	1	0-00	2	0-00	3	0-00
Total			52	11-75	16	4-23	9	1-02	77	16-100

== Honours ==
=== As a player ===
Scoil Ruáin

- All-Ireland Vocational Schools Junior Hurling Championship (1): 1992

Ballingarry

- South Tipperary Senior Hurling Championship (3): 1996, 1998, 2001
- Tipperary Minor Hurling Championship (2): 1994, 1995

Thurles Sarsfields

- Tipperary Senior Hurling Championship (1): 2009

Tipperary

- All-Ireland Senior Hurling Championship (1): 2001
- Munster Senior Hurling Championship (1): 2001
- National Hurling League (2): 1999, 2001
- Munster Minor Hurling Championship (1): 1993

Munster

- Railway Cup (1): 1997

Awards

- All Star Award (1): 1996

=== In management ===
Tipperary

- All-Ireland Senior Hurling Championship (1) 2025
- All-Ireland Under-20 Hurling Championship (1): 2019
- Munster Under-20 Hurling Championship (1): 2019
- All-Ireland Under-21 Hurling Championship (1): 2018
- All-Ireland Minor Hurling Championship (1): 2007, 2016
- Munster Under-20 Hurling Championship (1): 2019
- Munster Minor Hurling Championship (3): 2007, 2015, 2016

Waterford

- National Hurling League (1): 2022

Sporting positions
Preceded by Colm Bonnar	Tipperary Senior Hurling Manager; 2022-	Succeeded by
Preceded by William Maher	Tipperary Minor Hurling Manager; 2013–2017	Succeeded by Tommy Dunne
Preceded by William Maher	Tipperary Under-21/Under-20 Hurling Manager; 2017–2019	Succeeded by John Devane
Preceded by Páraic Fanning	Waterford Senior Hurling Manager; 2019–2022	Succeeded by Davy Fitzgerald
Achievements
Preceded by Jeffrey Lynskey	All-Ireland MHC winning manager 2016	Succeeded by Jeffrey Lynskey
Preceded by Pat Donnelly	All-Ireland Under-21 HC winning manager 2018	Succeeded by Himself
Preceded by Himself	All-Ireland Under-20 HC winning manager 2019	Succeeded by Pat Ryan
