= Ian Shanahan =

Irish hurler

Personal information
- Native name: Eoin Ó Seanacháin (Irish)
- Born: 2002 (age 23–24) Ballinakill, County Laois, Ireland
- Occupation: Aeronautical engineer

Sport
- Sport: Hurling
- Position: Full-back
Club
- Years: Club
- 2020–present: Ballinakill
Club titles
- Laois titles: 0
College
- Years: College
- 2021-2026: University of Limerick
College titles
- Fitzgibbon titles: 1
Inter-county
- Years: County
- 2023–present: Laois
Inter-county titles
- Leinster titles: 0
- All-Irelands: 0
- NHL: 0
- All Stars: 0

Ian Shanahan (born 2002) is an Irish hurler. At club level he plays with Ballinakill and at inter-county level with the Laois senior hurling team.

== Career ==
Shanahan studied aeronautical engineering at the University of Limerick] but also played hurling at various levels during his time there. He won a Fitzgibbon Cup medal in February 2026, after coming on as a late substitute in the 4–31 to 3–21 defeat of Mary Immaculate College in the final.

At club level, Shanahan first played for Ballinakill at juvenile and underage levels. He progressed to adult level and won a Laois PIHC medal in 2021, after a 2–14 to 1–14 win over Ballyfin in the final.

At inter-county level, Shanahan first played for Laois as a member of the minor team in 2019. He later spent three consecutive years with the under-20 team. Shanahan made his senior team debut in a National Hurling League game against Tipperary in February 2023.

Shanahan claimed his first silverware in 2024, when Laois beat Carlow to win the National Hurling League Division 2A title. He added a Division 2 medal to his collection in 2026. Shanahan was part of the Laois team that beat Carlow by 1–27 to 1–18 to win the Joe McDonagh Cup title in June 2026.

== Honours ==
University of Limerick

- Fitzgibbon Cup (1): 2026

Ballinakill

- Laois Premier Intermediate Hurling Championship (1): 2021

Laois

- Joe McDonagh Cup (1): 2026
- National Hurling League Division 2 (1): 2026
- National Hurling League Division 2A (1): 2024
