= Darragh McCarthy =

Irish hurler

Personal information
- Native name: Darragh Mac Cárthaigh (Irish)
- Born: August 2005 (age 21) Toomevara; County Tipperary, Ireland
- Occupation: Student
- Height: 5 ft 10 in (178 cm)

Sport
- Sport: Hurling
- Position: Right corner-forward
Club*
Years	Club	Apps (scores)
2023–present	Toomevara	16 (7-151)
Club titles
- Tipperary titles: 0
College
Years	College	Apps (scores)
2024–present	UL	4 (2-29)
College titles
- Fitzgibbon titles: 1
Inter-county**
Years	County	Apps (scores)
2024–present	Tipperary	11 (2-65)
Inter-county titles
- Munster titles: 0
- All-Irelands: 1
- NHL: 0
- All Stars: 0
- * club appearances and scores correct as of 21:47, 26 February 2026. **Inter County team apps and scores correct as of match played 24 May 2026.

Darragh McCarthy (born August 2005) is an Irish hurler. At club level he plays with Toomevara and at inter-county level with the Tipperary senior hurling team.

== Early life ==
Born and raised in Toomevara, County Tipperary, McCarthy played hurling at all levels as a student at St Joseph's CBS in Nenagh. He made his Harty Cup debut during the 2021–22 running of the competition. McCarthy spent three seasons as the team's free-taker before captaining St Joseph's CBS to their maiden Harty Cup title after a one-point win over Ardscoil Rís in 2024. He later earned a scholarship to the University of Limerick (UL) and won a Freshers 1 League title in 2024. McCarthy was the team's top scorer when University of Limerick beat Mary Immaculate College by 4–31 to 3–21 to win the Fitzgibbon Cup title in 2026.

== Club career ==
At club level, McCarthy first played for Toomevara at juvenile and underage levels. He won consecutive North Tipperary U19AHC titles in 2023 and 2024. McCarthy also joined the club's senior team in 2023 and was the overall top scorer when Toomevara were beaten by Loughmore–Castleiney in the 2024 SHC final.

== Inter-county career ==
McCarthy was just 16 when he first appeared on the inter-county scene with Tipperary as an impact sub with the minor team in 2022. He won a Munster MHC medal that season, before later scoring a point from a free in the 1–17 to 1–16 win over Offaly in the 2022 All-Ireland MHC final.

McCarthy subsequently spent three consecutive seasons with the under-21 team after immediately progressing to that grade from minor. He was Tipperary's top scorer in 2024, in a season which saw him win his first Munster U20HC before a 2–20 to 2–14 defeat by Offaly in the 2024 All-Ireland U20HC final. In his third and final season in the grade, McCarthy was again Tipperary's top scorer as he claimed a second consecutive Munster U20HC medal. His last game in the grade saw him win an All-Ireland U20HC medal after a 3–19 to 1–16 win over Kilkenny.

Performances at school, club and inter-county underage levels resulted in a call-up to the senior team's training panel in December 2024. He scored 1–06 on his debut in a National Hurling League defeat of Galway in January 2025. McCarthy was the league's top scorer but ended the campaign with a 3–24 to 0–23 defeat by Cork in the final. The subsequent championship campaign saw him being sent off after receiving a straight red card for striking Seán O'Donoghue in the first minute of the game against Cork. He was again sent off in the All-Ireland semi-final for a second yellow card offence on Kilkenny goalkeeper Eoin Murphy. McCarthy won an All-Ireland SHC medal in July 2025, after scoring 1–13, including a penalty, in the 3–27 to 1–18 win over Cork in the 2025 All-Ireland SHC final.

== Career statistics ==
=== Club ===
As of 27 September 2025

Team	Year	Tipperary SHC	
Team	Year	Apps	Score
Toomevara	2023	5	2-35
Toomevara	2024	6	3-62
Toomevara	2025	5	2-54
Career total		16	7-151

=== Underage Inter-county ===
As of match played 31 May 2025.

Team	Year	National League			Munster		All-Ireland		Total	
Team	Year	Division	Apps	Score	Apps	Score	Apps	Score	Apps	Score
Tipperary (MH)	2022	—			4	1-04	2	0-01	6	1-05
Tipperary (MH)	Total	—			4	1-04	2	0-01	6	1-05
Tipperary (U20)	2023	—			4	0-03	—		4	0-03
Tipperary (U20)	2024	—			5	1-38	1	1-05	6	2-43
Tipperary (U20)	2025	—			4	1-35	1	0-05	5	1-40
Tipperary (U20)	Total	—			13	2-76	2	1-10	15	3-86

=== Senior Inter-county ===
As of 24 May 2026

Team	Year	National League			Munster		All-Ireland		Total	
Team	Year	Division	Apps	Score	Apps	Score	Apps	Score	Apps	Score
Tipperary	2025	Division 1B	6	2-48	3	0-19	4	2-27	13	4-94
Tipperary	2026	Division 1B	5	1-19	4	0-19	—		9	1-38
Career total			11	3-67	7	0-38	4	2-27	22	5-132

== Honours ==
St Josephs CBS Nenagh

- Dr Harty Cup: 2024

University of Limerick

- Higher Education Freshers 1 Hurling League: 2024
- Fitzgibbon Cup: 2026

Toomevara

- North Tipperary Under-19 A Hurling Championship: 2023, 2024

Tipperary

- All-Ireland Senior Hurling Championship: 2025
- All-Ireland Under-20 Hurling Championship: 2025
- Munster Under-20 Hurling Championship: 2024, 2025
- All-Ireland Minor Hurling Championship: 2022
- Munster Minor Hurling Championship: 2022

Awards

- GAA/GPA Young Hurler of the Year (1): 2025
