= Conor Martin (Tipperary hurler) =

Irish hurler (born 2005)

Personal information
- Native name: Conchúr Ó Máirtín (Irish)
- Born: 2005 (age 20–21) Cappawhite; County Tipperary, Ireland
- Occupation: Student

Sport
- Sport: Hurling
- Position: Centre-forward
Club
- Years: Club
- 2023-present: Cappawhite
Club titles
- Tipperary titles: 0
College
- Years: College
- 2023-present: University of Limerick
Inter-county*
Years	County	Apps (scores)
2024-	Tipperary	0 (0-00)
Inter-county titles
- Munster titles: 0
- All-Irelands: 0
- NHL: 0
- All Stars: 0
- *Inter County team apps and scores correct as of 14:41, 15 December 2024.

Conor Martin (born 2005) is an Irish hurler. At club level he plays with Cappawhite and at inter-county level he was included, in December 2024, in the "training panel" of the Tipperary senior hurling team.

== Career ==
Martin played hurling and Gaelic football with his school team at The Abbey School in Tipperary. He played in all grades in both codes and had success in the Limerick U15BHC. Martin later studied at University of Limerick and won an All-Ireland Freshers HC title in 2024.

At club level, Martin first played for Cappawhite at juvenile and underage levels before eventually joining the club's top adult team in the Tipperary IHC.

Martin first appeared on the inter-county scene for Tipperary at the age of 17 as a member of the minor team that won the All-Ireland MHC title after a defeat of Offaly in 2022. He immediately progressed to the under-20 team and was an All-Ireland U20HC runner-up in 2024. Martin earned a call-up to the senior team's training panel in December 2024.

== Honours ==
The Abbey School

- Limerick PPS Under-15 B Hurling Championship: 2019

University of Limerick

- All-Ireland Freshers Hurling Championship: 2024
- Fitzgibbon Cup: 2026

Tipperary

- Munster Under-20 Hurling Championship: 2024
- All-Ireland Minor Hurling Championship: 2022
- Munster Minor Hurling Championship: 2022
