= 2025 All-Ireland Senior Hurling Championship final =

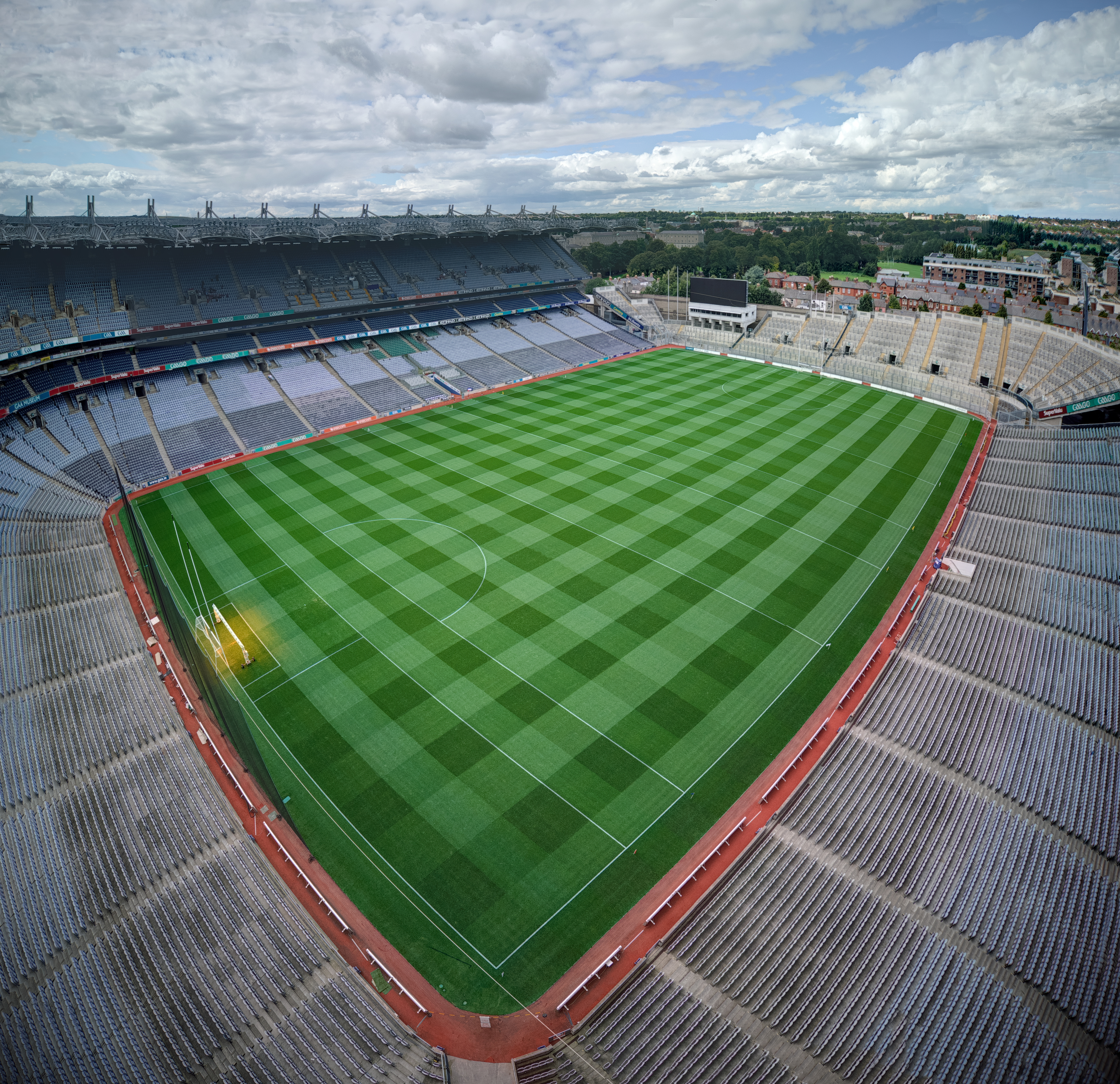
- Event: 2025 All-Ireland Senior Hurling Championship
Cork	Tipperary
1–18 (21)	3–27 (36)
- Date: 20 July 2025
- Venue: Croke Park, Dublin
- Man of the Match: Ronan Maher
- Referee: Liam Gordon (Galway)
- Weather: 20 °C (68 °F), windy

The 2025 All-Ireland Senior Hurling Championship final was a hurling match played at Croke Park in Dublin on 20 July 2025 between Cork and Tipperary, the culmination of the 2025 All-Ireland Senior Hurling Championship. It was the 138th final of that sport's primary competition, the All-Ireland Senior Hurling Championship.

Cork were strong favourites and led by six points at half time. However, they collapsed in the second half, with Tipperary outscoring them 3–14 to 0–2 to win by fifteen.

The match was televised nationally on RTÉ2 as part of The Sunday Game live programme, presented by Joanne Cantwell from the Croke Park studio with analysis by Anthony Daly, Dónal Óg Cusack and Liam Sheedy. Commentary on the game was provided by Marty Morrissey alongside Michael Duignan. The game was also televised on BBC Two Northern Ireland, presented by Sarah Mulkerrins who hosted the Hurling final for the 2nd year in a row, punditry came from Neil McManus,All-Ireland winners Shane O'Donnell, Paul Murphy and Séamus Flanagan. Commentary is by Thomas Niblock, Jamesie O’Connor and Sean Flanagan with pitch-side updates from Mark Sidebottom, Séamus Callanan and Diarmuid O'Sullivan.

The match drew an average TV audience of 980,000 viewers on RTÉ2 and peaked at 1,119,000 towards the end of the game.

== Background ==
- Cork were aiming to win their first title since 2005; they are the second most successful county in the championship's history, with 30 wins; their current streak of 19 consecutive seasons without an All-Ireland was the longest in their history.
- Tipperary won their first title since 2019 and their 29th title in total.
- First meeting of Cork and Tipperary in the final. Such a meeting was only possible since 1997, as prior to that only one Munster county could reach the final. However, both counties had been in 8 finals each since then, but never in the same year.
- The sixth final to involve two Munster teams, after 1997 (Clare beat Tipperary), 2013 (Clare beat Cork), 2020 (Limerick beat Waterford), 2021 (Limerick beat Cork), 2024 (Clare beat Cork).

== Paths to the final ==
Cork
Round	Date	Opponent	Venue (H/A/N)	Result	Victory margin	Score	Ref
Munster SHC round robin	20 April 2025	Clare	Cusack Park, Ennis (A)	Draw	0	2–24 to 3–21	
Munster SHC round robin	27 April 2025	Tipperary	Páirc Uí Chaoimh (H)	Win	15	4–27 to 0–24	
Munster SHC round robin	18 May 2025	Limerick	Gaelic Grounds (A)	Loss	–16	1–16 to 3–26	
Munster SHC round robin	25 May 2025	Waterford	Páirc Uí Chaoimh (H)	Win	6	2–25 to 1–22	
Munster SHC final	7 June 2025	Limerick	Gaelic Grounds (N)	Draw (won on penalties)	0	1–30 to 2–27 (a.e.t.)	
All-Ireland SHC semi-final	5 July 2025	Dublin	Croke Park (N)	Win	20	7–26 to 2–21	

Tipperary
Round	Date	Opponent	Venue (H/A/N)	Result	Victory margin	Score	Ref
Munster SHC round robin	20 April 2025	Limerick	Semple Stadium (H)	Draw	0	2–23 to 2–23	
Munster SHC round robin	27 April 2025	Cork	Páirc Uí Chaoimh (A)	Loss	–15	0–24 to 4–27	
Munster SHC round robin	10 May 2025	Clare	Cusack Park, Ennis (A)	Win	3	4-18 to 2–21	
Munster SHC round robin	18 May 2025	Waterford	Semple Stadium (H)	Win	9	1–30 to 1–21	
Preliminary quarter-final	14 June 2025	Laois	O'Moore Park (A)	Win	23	3–32 to 0–18	
All-Ireland SHC quarter-final	21 June 2025	Galway	Gaelic Grounds (N)	Win	8	1–28 to 2–17	
All-Ireland SHC semi-final	6 July 2025	Kilkenny	Croke Park (N)	Win	2	4–20 to 0–30	

== Pre-match ==
=== Transport ===
By 10 June, shortly after Cork and Limerick had contested the 2025 Munster Senior Hurling Championship final, it was reported that the Iarnród Éireann website had announced all tickets on its morning trains to Dublin from Cork Kent railway station and Limerick Colbert railway station for 20 July had sold out.

However, instead it was Tipperary who met Cork in the final. There was criticism (including from Cork-based TDs Colm Burke and Thomas Gould) of motorway toll barriers delaying supporters as they travelled to the semi-finals, and requests to have the barriers removed on the day of the final. This was rejected by Transport Infrastructure Ireland (TII).

=== Tickets ===
Tickets for the match were distributed by the clubs with no public sale and priced at €100 for the stands and €55 for the terrace.

=== Officials ===
On 8 July, the GAA named Galway's Liam Gordon of Killimor as the referee for the final, his first All-Ireland SHC decider. He previously refereed the 2019 All-Ireland Under-20 Hurling Championship final, and the 2023 Munster Senior Hurling Championship final. Sean Stack and Thomas Walsh were named to assist, Stack filling the role of stand-by referee.

=== Jubilee teams ===
The Kilkenny team that won the 2000 All-Ireland SHC final was presented to the crowd before the match, on the silver jubilee. Absent from the presentation was D. J. Carey, man of the match in the 2000 final but recently disgraced after pleading guilty to defrauding a number of people out of money while falsely claiming to have cancer. His name was announced to audible boos.

=== Team news ===
On 17 July the Cork team was named with no changes to the starting line-up from the semi-final win over Dublin. Séamus Harnedy returned to the panel after missing the semi-final with a hamstring injury. On 18 July the Tipperary team was named, also with no changes to the starting line-up from the semi-final win over Kilkenny. There was one change to the panel with Under-20's forward Paddy McCormack replacing Seán Kenneally.

== Match ==
=== Summary ===
==== First Half ====
The match was played in dry conditions with a slight breeze into the canal end in front of a sell-out crowd of 82,331. Cork playing with the light breeze in the first half opened the scoring with a point from Diarmuid Healy. Bryan O'Mara was playing as an extra man sweeper for Tipperary in the full back line with Willie Connors dropping in at wing-back and Sam O'Farrell also moving into midfield. After 12 minutes, Cork had a 0–4 to 0–3 lead with five wides from Tipperary. In the 20th minute, Eoghan Connolly found himself out on the left and went for goal with a low effort thar was just wide to the right at the hill 16 end.

In the 34th minute, Jason Forde scored a goal with a flick to the net after a high ball into the square from Eoghan Connolly which was disallowed when the referee called a square ball. In the 2nd of the two minutes of added time, Shane Barrett scored a goal for Cork after running in from the left before shooting low to the right corner to put Cork into a six-point lead at half time on a 1–16 to 0–13 scoreline.

==== Second Half ====
In the first minute Patrick Horgan sent a free wide for Cork at the hill 16 end. A minute later Andrew Ormond scored a point and got another point in the 41st minute to narrow the gap to four. Darragh McCarthy then added another point and a free to put one point between the sides. In the 45th minute, Tipperary scored a goal, Cork goalkeeper Patrick Collins batted out a high ball which was picked up by John McGrath before he slotted into the net to put Tipperary into a two-point lead. In the 53rd minute, Tipperary are awarded a penalty when John McGrath was pulled down by Eoin Downey who was already on a yellow and received a red card. Darragh McCarthy took the penalty and scored with a powerful shot to the left to put seven points between the sides.

In the 60th minute Tipperary got a third goal and a second for John McGrath when he flicked the ball right handed to the net past the advancing goalkeeper after a high ball into the square from Eoghan Connolly, putting twelve points between the sides. In the 69th minute, Tipperary goalkeeper Rhys Shelly scored a point from play to increase the lead to thirteen points, it was the first ever point scored by a goalkeeper from open play in an All-Ireland final. In added time Cork were awarded a penalty when Brian Hayes was fouled, Rhys Shelley dived to his right to save the penalty from Conor Lehane. Darragh McCarthy then scored from a free before passing to Noel McGrath to get the final point of the game with Tipperary winning by 3–27 to 1-18. They won the second half by 21 points with Cork only scoring two points.

=== Details ===
RTÉ 2
BBC

July 20, 2025
15:35 IST (UTC+01:00)
Final

Report

Cork	1-18 (21) – (36) 3-27	Tipperary
(HT: 1-16 – 0-13)
Gls: Shane Barrett 1 Pts: Shane Barrett 4, Patrick Horgan 4 (3f), Diarmuid Healy 3, Darragh Fitzgibbon 2, Brian Hayes 1, Alan Connolly 1, Declan Dalton 1f, Niall O'Leary 1, Seamus Harnedy 1		Gls: John McGrath 2, Darragh McCarthy 1(pen); Pts: Darragh McCarthy 13 (9fs), John McGrath 2, Jake Morris 2, Jason Forde 2, Andrew Ormond 2, Eoghan Connolly 1, Robert Doyle 1, Willie Connors 1, Conor Stakelum 1, Rhys Shelly 1, Noel McGrath 1

Croke Park, Dublin
Referee: Liam Gordon (Galway)
Attendance: 82,331
Standby: Seán Stack (Dublin)
Linesman: Thomas Walsh (Waterford)
Sideline: Colm McDonald (Antrim)
Umpires: Damien Gibbons, Alan McClearn, John Larkin, Ollie Reilly (all Killimor)

Cork	Tipperary

GK	1	Patrick Collins
FB	2	Niall O'Leary
FB	3	Eoin Downey	(yellow card) 31' (yellow-red card) 54'
FB	4	Seán O'Donoghue
HB	5	Ciarán Joyce
HB	6	Robert Downey (c)	(yellow card) 42'
HB	7	Mark Coleman
MF	8	Tim O'Mahony		(substituted off) 67'
MF	9	Darragh Fitzgibbon
HF	10	Diarmuid Healy		(substituted off) 56'
HF	11	Shane Barrett
HF	12	Declan Dalton		(substituted off) 44'
FF	13	Patrick Horgan		(substituted off) 58'
FF	14	Alan Connolly	(yellow card) 47'	(substituted off) 64'
FF	15	Brian Hayes
Substitutes:
	16	Bríon Saunderson
	17	Damien Cahalane		(substituted on) 56'
	18	Ger Millerick
	19	Cormac O'Brien
	20	Tommy O'Connell		(substituted on) 67'
	21	Luke Meade
	22	Brian Roche
	23	Séamus Harnedy		(substituted on) 44'
	24	Robbie O'Flynn
	25	Conor Lehane		(substituted on) 58'
	26	Shane Kingston		(substituted on) 64'
Manager:
Pat Ryan

GK	1	Rhys Shelly
FB	2	Robert Doyle	(yellow card) 47'
FB	3	Eoghan Connolly
FB	4	Michael Breen
HB	5	Craig Morgan		(substituted off) 56'
HB	6	Ronan Maher (c)
HB	7	Bryan O'Mara		(substituted off) 50'
MF	8	Willie Connors	(yellow card) 45'
MF	9	Conor Stakelum		(substituted off) 65'
HF	10	Jake Morris		(substituted off) 66'
HF	11	Andrew Ormond
HF	12	Sam O'Farrell		(substituted off) 59'
FF	13	Darragh McCarthy
FF	14	John McGrath
FF	15	Jason Forde
Substitutes:
	16	Barry Hogan
	17	Joe Caesar
	18	Séamus Kennedy		(substituted on) 50'
	19	Paddy McCormack
	20	Brian McGrath
	21	Noel McGrath		(substituted on) 59'
	22	Peter McGarry
	23	Oisín O'Donoghue		(substituted on) 66'
	24	Johnny Ryan
	25	Darragh Stakelum		(substituted on) 65'
	26	Alan Tynan		(substituted on) 56'
Manager:
Liam Cahill

=== Trophy presentation ===
Tipperay captain Ronan Maher accepted the Liam MacCarthy Cup from GAA president Jarlath Burns in the Hogan Stand and the team then did a victory lap around Croke Park with the trophy. In his speech, Maher paid tribute to former team mate Dillon Quirke, who died in 2022.

=== Reaction ===
Tipperary manager Liam Cahill never doubted his players saying "The honesty of that group of players – I never doubted them. I know we were all a little bit sensitive after last year with what happened, and some of the criticism was probably deserved at times, but I knew the quality of these men". Cork manager Pat Ryan speaking after the game felt that Tipperary deserved the win saying "Look, credit to Tipperary. They came out and worked really, really hard. We were in a good position at half-time, but we got blown away in the second half.”

Highlights of the final were shown on The Sunday Game programme which aired at 9:30pm that night on RTÉ2 and was presented by Jacqui Hurley with match analysis from Jackie Tyrrell, Brendan Cummins, Dónal Óg Cusack, Joe Canning, Henry Shefflin, and Ursula Jacob. On the man of the match award shortlist were captain Ronan Maher, John McGrath and Darragh McCarthy with Ronan Maher winning the award which was presented by GAA president Jarlath Burns at the post match Tipperary function at the Grand Hotel in Malahide in Dublin.

=== Homecoming ===
Members of the Tipperary team and management visited Crumlin Children's Hospital on the morning after the game and also stopped off at the Palace Bar in Dublin before arriving back in Thurles at a reception at Semple Stadium. A temporary stage was set up along the side-line of the new stand for the event with the crowd on the pitch. The team arrived at 8:15pm with approximately 45,000 in attendance to greet them on stage in Thurles. The Tipperary senior back-room team were introduced before all the players and captain Ronan Maher and manager Liam Cahill. Entertainment was provided by Seskin Lane, Callini Lua, Acquiesce, Una Healy, and The 2 Johnnies. In Cork it was agreed by the county board, not by the players, that there would be no homecoming event held.

=== Miscellaneous ===
Darragh McCarthy scoring 1-13(1 pen, 9f 4pts) 93.33% efficiency, was the 4th top scorer in an All Ireland final history. Behind Mick 'Gah' Ahern, Nicky English & Eddie Keher. The 20 year old registered 1 wide from 15 shots taken at goal.

Noel McGrath pocketed his fourth all Ireland medal, first Tipp hurler to do so in 54 years.

Jason Forde had a contentious goal ruled out for a square just before half time, as he beat Patrick Collins to a long range delivery before half time, flicking the ball to the net.

Eoin Downey became at the least the 9th player to be red carded in an All Ireland Senior hurling final, after he received second yellow for fouling John McGrath in the penalty box, in the 53rd minute.
