= 2025 Munster Senior Hurling Championship final =

- Event: 2025 Munster Senior Hurling Championship
| Limerick | Cork |
| 2–27 | 1–30 |
- Date: 7 June 2025
- Venue: Gaelic Grounds, Limerick
- Man of the Match: Darragh Fitzgibbon (Cork)
- Referee: Thomas Walsh (Waterford); James Owens (Wexford)
- Attendance: 43,580
- Weather: Dry

The 2025 Munster Senior Hurling Championship final was a hurling match that was played on 7 June at the Gaelic Grounds in Limerick. It was contested by Cork and the defending champion Limerick.

Cork won the match on penalties and claimed a 55th Munster title, ending Limerick’s run of six titles in a row.

== Pre-match ==
The game was televised live on RTÉ 2 as part of The Sunday Game, presented by Joanne Cantwell. Commentary on the game was provided by Marty Morrissey, alongside Brendan Cummins.

Ticket prices for the final were €50 for the stand, and €40 for terrace, an increase of €5 from the 2024 final, all tickets sold-out from season tickets and club distributions.

Gavin James performed a 40-minute set before the start of the match.

== Match ==
=== Summary ===
Limerick were bidding to win a seventh Munster title in a row. Cork, captained by Robert Downey and managed by Pat Ryan, won the match 3–2 on penalties after a 2–27 to 1–30 draw after extra-time, it was their 55th Munster Senior hurling title.

Cork were ahead by 1–14 to 1–10 at half-time and the sides were level 15 times during the match.

Darragh Fitzgibbon saw his effert saved in the shootout before Conor Lehane, Shane Kingston and Alan Conolly all scored for Cork. Diarmaid Byrnes and Aaron Gillane scord their penalties with Tom Morrissey's being saved and Barry Murphy and Declan Hannon both sending their penalties wide.

It was the first Munster final to be decided by penalties.

During the extra-time, referee Thomas Walsh had to retire with cramp after 73 minutes and was replaced by stand-by official and linesman James Owens for the rest of the match.

=== Details ===
7 June 2025
18:00
Munster Final

| Limerick | 2–27 (33)–(33) 1–30 (a.e.t.) | Cork |
|---|---|---|
| | Report; Highlights |
Penalties
| | 2–3 |

TUS Gaelic Grounds, Limerick
Attendance: 43,580
Referee: Thomas Walsh (Waterford)
James Owens (Wexford)
Man of the match: Darragh Fitzgibbon (Cork)

== Post-match ==
By 10 June, shortly after the game, it was reported that the Iarnród Éireann website had announced all tickets on its morning trains to Dublin from Cork Kent railway station and Limerick Colbert railway station for 20 July (the date of the 2025 All-Ireland Senior Hurling Championship final) had sold out.
