= Peter McGarry (hurler) =

Irish Gaelic footballer and hurler

Personal information
- Born: Clonmel, County Tipperary, Ireland

Sport
- Sport: Gaelic football
- Position: Midfield
Clubs
- Years: Club
- Clonmel Commercials (football); St Mary's (hurling)
Inter-county*
Years	County	Apps (scores)
2025–	Tipperary	2 (0–0)
Inter-county titles
- All-Irelands: 1
- *Inter County team apps and scores correct as of match played 21 June 2025.

Peter McGarry is an Irish Gaelic footballer and hurler who plays in midfield for the Tipperary county hurling team.

== Career ==
In January 2025, McGarry was called up to the senior team's training panel for the 2025 National Hurling League. He made his senior debut for Tipperary on 14 June 2025 when he came on as a substitute in the second half of the All-Ireland SHC preliminary quarter-final, a 3–32 to 0–18 win against Laois. A week later he made his first start for Tipperary in the 1–28 to 2–17 win against Galway in the All-Ireland SHC quarter-final.

On 20 July in the 2025 All-Ireland final, McGarry was an unused substitute as Tipperary defeated Cork by 3–27 to 1-19 and claim a 29th All-Ireland title.

== Honours ==
Tipperary

- All-Ireland Senior Hurling Championship (1): 2025

St Mary's Hurling Club, Clonmel

- Tipperary Premier Intermediate Hurling Championship (1): 2026

Clonmel Commercials

- Tipperary Senior Football Championship (2): 2022, 2023
