= Andrew Ormond =

Irish hurler

Personal information
- Born: February 2000 (age 26) Templemore Co. Tipperary
- Occupation: Primary school teacher

Sport
- Sport: Hurling
- Position: Centre-forward
Club
- Years: Club
- JK Brackens
College
- Years: College
- Our Lady's Secondary School, Templemore Mary Immaculate College
Inter-county*
Years	County	Apps (scores)
2024–	Tipperary	12 (3-16)
Inter-county titles
- Munster titles: 0
- All-Irelands: 1
- NHL: 0
- All Stars: 1
- *Inter County team apps and scores correct as of matches played in 2026.

Andrew Ormond is an Irish hurler who plays club hurling for JK Brackens and at inter-county level with the Tipperary senior hurling team.

== Career ==
On 3 February 2024, he made his league debut for Tipperary in the opening round of the 2024 National Hurling League against Dublin, scoring a point as Tipperary won by 2–27 to 0–22.

On 10 May 2025, Ormond scored 2-1 against Clare in Ennis as Tipperary defeated Clare by 4-18 to 2-21 for their first win in the Munster championship since April 2023. On 20 July in the 2025 All-Ireland final, Ormond started in the half-forward line and scored two points early in the second half as Tipperary came from six points down to defeat Cork by 3-27 to 1-19 and claim a 29th All-Ireland title.

In November 2025, Ormond won his first PwC All-Star award when he named in the team for 2025 in the half-forward line.

== Career statistics ==
As of match played 26 April 2026

Team	Year	National League			Munster		All-Ireland		Total	
Team	Year	Division	Apps	Score	Apps	Score	Apps	Score	Apps	Score
Tipperary	2024	Division 1	2	0-01	2	0-00	-		4	0-01
Tipperary	2025	Division 1	5	0-04	3	2-05	4	0-10	12	2-19
Tipperary	2026	Division 1	6	0-06	3	1-01			9	1-07
Career total			13	0-11	8	3-06	4	0-10	25	3-27

== Honours ==
Our Lady's Secondary School Templemore

- Dr. Harty Cup (1): 2017
- Dr. Croke Cup (1): 2017

J.K. Bracken's

- Séamus Ó Riain Cup (1): 2019
- Mid Tipperary Senior Hurling Championship (2): 2022, 2025

Tipperary

- All-Ireland Senior Hurling Championship (1): 2025
- All-Ireland Under-20 Hurling Championship (1): 2019
- Munster Under-20 Hurling Championship (1): 2019

Individual

- The Sunday Game Team of the Year (1): 2025
- All Star Award (1): 2025
