= Joe Caesar (hurler) =

Irish hurler

Personal information
- Born: 06-05-2003

Sport
- Sport: Hurling
- Position: Wing-back
Club
- Years: Club
- Holycross–Ballycahill
Club titles
- Tipperary titles: 0
College titles
- Fitzgibbon titles: 1
Inter-county*
Years	County	Apps (scores)
2024–	Tipperary	7(0-02)
Inter-county titles
- Munster titles: 0
- All-Irelands: 1
- NHL: 0
- All Stars: 0
- *Inter County team apps and scores correct as of 21:41, 15 December 2024.

Joe Caesar is an Irish hurler. At club level he plays with Holycross–Ballycahill and at inter-county level he plays with the Tipperary senior hurling team.

== Career ==
He won a Fitzgibbon Cup Title in 2024 with Mary Immaculate College. He also wonFitzgibbon Cup player of the match as well as receiving an Electric Ireland RsiningStar at wing back. He was called up to the senior team's training panel in December 2024. He was later included on Tipperary's 38-player panel for the 2025 National Hurling League and made his senior debut for Tipperary on 22 February 2025 in round 4 of the National hurling league.

On 20 July in the 2025 All-Ireland final, he was an unused substitute as Tipperary defeated Cork by 3–27 to 1-19 and claim a 29th All-Ireland title.

== Honours ==
Tipperary

- All-Ireland Senior Hurling Championship (1): 2025
