= 2026 Fitzgibbon Cup =

Irish collegiate hurling tournament

- Dates: 7 January - 13 February 2026
- Teams: 12
- Sponsor: Electric Ireland
- Champions: University of Limerick (10th title); Colin Coughlan (captain); Brian Ryan (manager)
- Runners-up: Mary Immaculate College; Shane O'Brien (captain); Eoin Lawless (captain); Jamie Wall (manager)
- Relegated: ATU Galway; Garda College

Tournament statistics
- Matches played: 21
- Goals scored: 79 (3.76 per match)
- Points scored: 770 (36.67 per match)
- Top scorer(s): Shane O'Brien (2-42)

The 2026 Fitzgibbon Cup was the 109th staging of the Fitzgibbon Cup since its establishment by the Gaelic Athletic Association in 1912. The draw for the group stage fixtures took place on 2 December 2025. The competition ran from 7 January to 13 February 2026.

University of Limerick were the defending champions.

The final was played on 13 February 2026 at Croke Park in Dublin, between University of Limerick and Mary Immaculate College, in what was their third meeting in the final overall. University of Limerick won the match by 4–31 to 3–21 to claim their 10th Fitzgibbon Cup title overall and a fourth title in five years.

Mary Immaculate College's Shane O'Brien was the top scorer with 2-42.

== Team changes ==
=== From Ryan Cup ===
Promoted from the Ryan Cup

- Garda College

== Group A ==
=== Group A table ===
Knockout stage Relegation playoff

Team	Matches				Score			Pts
Team	Pld	W	D	L	For	Against	Diff	Pts
University of Limerick	2	2	0	0	85	35	50	4
DCU Dóchas Éireann	2	1	0	1	51	61	-10	2
Maynooth University	2	0	0	2	37	77	-40	0

=== Group A results ===
7 January 2026 Round 1	University of Limerick	6-31 - 1-09	Maynooth University	UL Grounds, Maguires Pitches
	O O Donoghue (3-5); D McCarthy (1-4, 3f); J O’Neill (0-4); A O’Connor (1-1, 1f); A Screeney (0-3, 2f); J Ormond (1-0); P Crotty, D Stritch, K Smyth, C O’Neill (0-2 each); M Fitzgerald, A English (1f), K Doyle, A Morgan, F Fitzgerald, O Fitzgerald (0-1 each).	Report	M Brennan (0-6, 3f); D McCormack (1-1); E Cunneen (1f), D Maher (0-1 each).

14 January 2026 Round 2	Maynooth University	2-19 - 2-22	DCU Dóchas Éireann	Maynooth North Campus
		Report	D Walsh (0-11, 8f), S Byrne (1-4).

21 January 2025 Round 3	DCU Dóchas Éireann	1-20 - 4-24	University of Limerick	DCU Sportsgrounds
	D Murphy 1-5; D Walsh 0-8 (7 frees); S Rowley 0-2; D Shirley, B Reid, C Beirne, P Clarke, N Hogan 0-1 each.	Report	A English 2-1; A O'Connor 0-6 (1 free, 1 65); D McCarthy 1-2; A Screeney 1-1; J O'Neill 0-5; O O'Donoghue, J Ormond 0-2 each; K Smyth, O Fitzgerald, C O'Neill, C Martin, D Langan 0-1 each.

== Group B ==
=== Group B table ===
Knockout stage Relegation playoff

Team	Matches				Score			Pts
Team	Pld	W	D	L	For	Against	Diff	Pts
MTU Cork	2	2	0	0	55	32	23	4
University College Cork	2	1	0	1	50	53	-3	2
Garda College	2	0	0	2	37	57	-20	0

=== Group B results ===
8 January 2026 Round 1	University College Cork	1-16 - 1-26	MTU Cork	The Mardyke
	B Cunningham 0-9 f, S Kingston 1-0, B Keating, W Buckley 0-2 each, P McGarry, D Flynn, E McDermott 0-1 each.	Report	M Finn 0-12 (0-9 f, 0-1 65), D Healy 0-4, A Walsh, R Deasy 0-3 each, A McEvoy 1-0, J Murphy 0-2, R Walsh, C Ryan 0-1 each.

15 January 2026 Round 1	MTU Cork	2-20 - 0-13	Garda College	MTU Cork Campus
	M Finn (0-10, 0-7 frees, 0-1 ‘65); A McEvoy (1-5); A Walsh (1-1); J Murphy (0-2); D Healy, R Deasy (0-1 each).	Report	C Boyle (0-5, 0-2 free, 0-1 ‘65); R Stapleton (0-3); D O’Leary (0-2); D Hand, C Kirwan, T Doyle (0-1 each).

22 January 2025 Round 3	Garda College	1-21 - 4-19	University College Cork	Páirc Shíleáin
	C Boyle 0-16 (0-15 f), J Doyle 1-0, D Hayes, C Kirwan, L Carr, R Stapleton, S Fitzgibbon 0-1 each.	Report	W Buckley 0-10 (0-5 f), E McDermott 1-2, D Stakelum 1-1, H O’Connor, C Walsh 1-0, each, T Wilk 0-2, P McGarry, M Mullaney, D Flynn, J Dwyer 0-1 each.

== Group C ==
=== Group C table ===
Knockout stage Relegation playoff

Team	Matches				Score			Pts
Team	Pld	W	D	L	For	Against	Diff	Pts
University of Galway	2	1	1	0	50	41	9	3
University College Dublin	2	1	1	0	53	49	4	2
TUS Midwest	2	0	1	1	41	54	-13	0

=== Group C results ===
8 January 2026 Round 1	University of Galway	3-20 - 1-17	University College Dublin	Dangan Grounds
	S O’Farrell 1-8 (0-4 frees, 1 65); C Mitchell 1-2; T Guinan 1-1; L Hoare (frees), D Neary, L Leen 0-2 each; G Thomas, D Comar, G Lee 0-1 each.	Report	D Williams 0-7 (0-4 frees); David Purcell 1-1; D Lee 0-3; J Duggan, Dara Purcell, L Connellan, D Guerin, S Roche, C O Riain 0-1 each.

15 January 2026 Round 2	University College Dublin	5-18 - 1-17	TUS Midwest	Belfield Grounds
		Report

21 January 2025 Round 3	TUS Midwest	2-15 - 0-21	University of Galway	TUS Midwest Grounds
	F Hegarty 0-10 (0-8 frees); P McCormack 1-3; S Kenneally 1-1; N O’Farrell 0-1.	Report	S O’Farrell 0-9 (0-8 frees); D Neary, T Leen, L Hoare (both frees), D Bourke 0-2 each; G Thomas, G Lee, R Davitt, F O Brioin 0-1 each.

== Group D ==
=== Group D table ===
Knockout stage Relegation playoff

Team	Matches				Score			Pts
Team	Pld	W	D	L	For	Against	Diff	Pts
Mary Immaculate College	2	2	0	0	61	46	15	4
SETU Waterford	2	1	0	1	46	53	-7	2
ATU Galway	2	0	0	2	43	51	-8	0

=== Group D results ===
7 January 2026 Round 1	Mary Immaculate College	4-22 - 2-16	SETU Waterford	MICL Grounds
	O O'Farrell (4-3); S O'Brien (0-7, 0-4 frees), S Whelan 0-4; S Boyce 0-2; E Craddock, J Caesar, C Lawless, R O'Connor, A Daly and D Walsh (free) (0-1 each).	Report	L Codd (1-5, 0-3 frees, 0-1 65); T Carey 1-0, T O'Connell (0-3, 0-2 frees, 0-1 65); J Groves, W Beresford 0-2 each; J Walsh, C Connick, C King, S O'Rourke 0-1 each.

15 January 2026 Round 2	SETU Waterford	3-15 - 1-16	ATU Galway	SETU Arena
		Report

21 January 2025 Round 3	ATU Galway	5-09 - 1-24	Mary Immaculate College	Liam Mellows Grounds
	D Shaughnessy 3-0, A Donohue and O Lohan 1-0 each, R Burke (0-2, 0-2 frees), D Dunne (0-2, 0-1 free), C Dolphin, P Commins, C Trayers, P McGurk, D Donohue 0-1 each.	Report	S O'Brien (1-15, 0-11 frees), O O'Farrell 0-3, E Craddock, J Caesar, A Daly, J Quilty, D Campbell 0-1 each D Walsh (0-1, 0-1 free).

== Relegation stage ==
=== Playoffs ===
27 January 2026 Semi-final	TUS Midwest	0-18 - 2-08	ATU Galway	TUS Midwest Grounds
		Report

28 January 2026 Semi-final	Maynooth University	3-16 - 0-18	Garda College	Maynooth University North Campus

== Knockout stage ==
=== Quarter-finals ===
28 January 2026 Quarter-final	Mary Immaculate College	3-22 - 0-13	University College Dublin	MICL Grounds
	O O’Farrell (2-3); S O’Brien (0-8, 0-5 frees, 0-1 ‘65); S Walsh (1-5, 0-4 frees); A Daly (0-3); R O’Connor, E Craddock, S Whelan (0-1 each).	Report	D Williams (0-3, 0-2 frees); P McDonald, C Ó Riain, L Connellan (0-2 each); D Geurin, S Roche, D Lee, D Purcell (0-1 each).

28 January 2026 Quarter-final	University of Limerick	0-20 - 0-12	University College Cork	UL Grounds
	D McCarthy 0-9 (7 frees); A Screeney, D Stritch, A English 0-2 each; A O’Connor, J Fitzgerald, J O’Neill, J Leahy, F Fitzgerald 0-1 each.	Report	W Buckey 0-7 (0-4 frees); B Keating, H O’Connor 0-2 each; C Walsh 0-1.

28 January 2026 Quarter-final	MTU Cork	2-15 - 4-13	DCU Dóchas Éireann	MTU Cork Grounds
	M Finn 0-5 (0-4 f), A Walsh 1-2, D Healy 1-1, R Walsh 0-3 (0-1 f), R Deasy 0-2, R O’Connor, D O’Sullivan (0-1 f) 0-1 each.	Report	D Walsh 1-5 (1-0 penalty, 0-4 f), C Beirne 0-5, S Byrne, D Murphy 1-0 each, S Gallagher, P Clarke, G Kelly 0-1 each.

28 January 2026 Quarter-final	University of Galway	1-21 - 1-14	SETU Waterford	Dangan Grounds
	S O’Farrell 0-11 (7f); G Lee 0-4; D Neary 1-1; T Leen, L Leen, F Ó Brioin, D Bourke and G Thomas 0-1 each.	Report	T Carey 0-10 (10f); T O’Connell 1-1; G Dunne, J Walsh and J Groves 0-1 each.

=== Semi-finals ===
4 February 2026 Semi-final	DCU Dóchas Éireann	2-16 - 0-31	Mary Immaculate College	DCU Sportsgrounds
	D Walsh 0-8 (0-8f), P Clarke 2-0, G Kelly 0-3, C Beirne 0-3, S Byrne 0-1, D O'Meara 0-1.	Report	S Walsh 0-13 (0-12f), C Scully 0-6, A Daly 0-4, E Craddock 0-2, B Currivan 0-2 (0-1f), O O'Farrell 0-2, R O'Connor 0-1, J Quilty 0-1.

4 February 2026 Semi-final	University of Limerick	0-18 - 1-13	University of Galway	UL Grounds
	D McCarthy (0-6, 6fs); A Screeney (0-5); J O’Neill (0-3); A O’Connor (0-2); O O’Donoghue, J Leahy (0-1 each).	Report	S O’Farrell (0-5, 2f); D Neary (1-1); L Hoare (0-3, 3fs); G Lee, D Comar, C Kileen, G Thomas (0-1 each).

=== Final ===
13 February 2026 Final	Mary Immaculate College	3-21 - 4-31	University of Limerick	Croke Park
	S O’Brien (1-12, 1-0 pen, 0-7 frees, 0-1 65); J Caesar (1-3); B Currivan (1-0); D Walsh (free), R O’Connor, O O’Farrell, J Quilty, S Walsh, D Campbell (0-1 each).	Report	J Leahy (1-5); D McCarthy (0-8, 7 frees); C O’Neill (0-7); A English, F Fitzgerald (1-1 each); J O’Neill (1-0); C Coughlan, A O’Connor (0-3 each); O O’Donoghue, A Screeney, D Stritch (0-1 each).	Referee: L Gordon (Galway)

== Statistics ==
=== Top scorers ===
Rank	Player	Club	Tally	Total	Matches	Average
1	Shane O'Brien	MICL	2-42	48	4	12.00
2	Darragh McCarthy	University of Limerick	2-29	37	4	9.25
3	Sam O'Farrell	University of Galway	1-33	36	4	9.00
4	Denis Walsh	DCU Dóchas Éireann	1-32	35	4	8.75
5	Oisín O'Farrell	MICL	6-12	30	5	6.00
6	Mikey Finn	MTU Cork	0-27	27	3	9.00
7	Shane Walsh	MICL	1-19	22	4	5.50
8	Cian Boyle	Garda College	0-21	21	2	10.50
9	William Buckley	UCC	0-19	19	3	6.33
10	Oisín O'Donoghue	University of Limerick	3-09	18	5	3.60
