= Robert Doyle (hurler) =

Irish hurler

Personal information
- Native name: Riobeard Ó Dúghaill (Irish)
- Born: 2003 (age 22–23) Clonoulty, County Tipperary, Ireland
- Occupation: Student

Sport
- Sport: Hurling
- Position: Right corner-back
Club
- Years: Club
- Clonoulty–Rossmore
Club titles
- Tipperary titles: 0
College
- Years: College
- TUS Midwest
College titles
- Fitzgibbon titles: 0
Inter-county*
Years	County	Apps (scores)
2025–	Tipperary	11 (0-02)
Inter-county titles
- Munster titles: 0
- All-Irelands: 1
- NHL: 0
- All Stars: 1
- *Inter County team apps and scores correct as of match played 24 May 2026.

Robert Doyle (born 2003) is an Irish hurler. At club level he plays with Clonoulty–Rossmore and at inter-county level with the Tipperary senior hurling team.

== Career ==
Doyle played hurling as a student at Thurles CBS. He was part of the school team that won the Rice Cup after a 2–22 to 0–07 defeat of Nenagh CBS in 2017. Doyle later claimed a Dean Ryan Cup medal in 2019 after a 2–11 to 1–09 win over De La Salle College. He later lined out with TUS Midwest in the Fitzgibbon Cup.

At club level, Doyle plays with Clonoulty–Rossmore. He first appeared on the inter-county scene with Tipperary as a member of the minor team in 2020, before lining out with the under-20 team in 2023. Doyle became a regular member of the senior team during the National Hurling League in 2025.

On 20 July in the 2025 All-Ireland final, Doyle started at corner-back as Tipperary defeated Cork by 3–27 to 1-19 and claim a 29th All-Ireland title.

== Career statistics ==
As of match played 24 May 2026

Team	Year	National League			Munster		All-Ireland		Total	
Team	Year	Division	Apps	Score	Apps	Score	Apps	Score	Apps	Score
Tipperary	2025	Division 1	7	0-00	4	0-00	3	0-02	14	0-02
Tipperary	2026	Division 1			4	0-00			4	0-00
Career total			7	0-00	8	0-00	3	0-02	18	0-02

== Honours ==
Thurles CBS

- Dean Ryan Cup: (1) 2018
- Rice Cup: (1) 2017

Tipperary

- All-Ireland Senior Hurling Championship: (1) 2025

Individual

- The Sunday Game Team of the Year (1): 2025
- All Star Award (1): 2025
