= Oisín O'Donoghue =

Irish hurler

Personal information
- Native name: Oisín Ó Donnchú (Irish)
- Born: 2006 (age 19–20) Cashel; County Tipperary, Ireland
- Occupation: Student

Sport
- Sport: Hurling
- Position: Full-forward
Club*
Years	Club	Apps (scores)
2024–	Cashel King Cormacs	11 (2-15)
Club titles
- Tipperary titles: 0
College
- Years: College
- 2024–: University of Limerick
College titles
- Fitzgibbon titles: 1
Inter-county**
Years	County	Apps (scores)
2024–	Tipperary	8 (3-08)
Inter-county titles
- Munster titles: 0
- All-Irelands: 1
- NHL: 0
- All Stars: 0
- * club appearances and scores correct as of 21:42, 23 March 2026. **Inter County team apps and scores correct as of match played 26 April 2026.

Oisín O'Donoghue (born 2006) is an Irish hurler. At club level he plays with Cashel King Cormacs and at inter-county level with the Tipperary senior hurling team.

== Career ==
O'Donoghue played hurling while in secondary school at Cashel Community School. He was a member of the school's senior team when they won their maiden Harty Cup title in 2023.

At club level, O'Donoghue first played for Cashel King Cormacs at juvenile and underage levels. He won a West Tipperary U19AHC title in 2024 after scoring 0–17 in the final. O'Donoghue also joined the club's top adult team in 2024 and won a Tipperary PIHC title after a 2–17 to 0–19 defeat of Carrick Swans in the final.

O'Donoghue first appeared on the inter-county scene for Tipperary at the age of 17 as vice-captain of the minor team in 2023. He subsequently progressed to the under-20 team and was an All-Ireland U20HC runner-up in 2024. O'Donoghue's performances at club and inter-county underage levels resulted in a call-up to the senior team's training panel on 15 December 2024.

He made his senior debut for Tipperary on 2 February 2025 in a 1–22 to 0–19 win against Wexford in round 2 of the 2025 National Hurling League.

He made his senior championship debut for Tipperary on the 10 May 2025, coming off the bench as Tipperary beat Clare 4–18 to 2–21 in round 3 of the 2025 Munster Senior Hurling Championship. He again came off the bench in round 4 against Waterford, scoring 1-01, as Tipperary won out on a score-line of 1–30 to 1-21. This win resulted in Tipperary finishing in 3rd position in the Munster championship, progressing to the knockout stages of the 2025 All-Ireland Senior Hurling Championship. In the preliminary quarter final win against Laois he scored a point off of the bench, while in the quarter final tie against Galway he once again scored a goal off of the bench as Tipp won out on a score-line of 1–28 to 2–17.

On 20 July in the 2025 All-Ireland final, he came on as a substitute as Tipperary defeated Cork by 3–27 to 1-19 and claim a 29th All-Ireland title.

== Career statistics ==
As of match played 26 April 2026

Team	Year	National League			Munster		All-Ireland		Total	
Team	Year	Division	Apps	Score	Apps	Score	Apps	Score	Apps	Score
Tipperary	2025	Division 1A	3	1-02	2	1-01	4	2-01	9	4-04
Tipperary	2026	Division 1A	5	0-03	2	0-06	0	0-00	7	0-09
Career total			8	1-05	4	1-07	4	2-01	16	4-13

== Honours ==
Cashel Community School

- Dr Harty Cup: 2023

University of Limerick

- Fitzgibbon Cup: 2026

Cashel King Cormacs

- Tipperary Premier Intermediate Hurling Championship: 2024
- West Tipperary Under-19 A Hurling Championship: 2024

Tipperary

- All-Ireland Senior Hurling Championship (1): 2025
- All-Ireland Under-20 Hurling Championship: 2025
- Munster Under-20 Hurling Championship: 2024, 2025
