= Kian O'Kelly =

Irish hurler

Sport
- Sport: Hurling
- Position: Half-forward
Club
- Years: Club
- Kilruane MacDonagh
Club titles
- Tipperary titles: 0
Inter-county
Years	County	Apps (scores)
2023 -	Tipperary	0
Inter-county titles
- Munster titles: 0
- All-Irelands: 0
- NHL: 0
- All Stars: 0

Kian O'Kelly is an Irish hurler who plays club hurling for Kilruane MacDonagh and at inter-county level with the Tipperary senior hurling team.

== Career ==
On 19 March 2023, he made his league debut for Tipperary in the fifth round of the 2023 National Hurling League, starting against Antrim, as Tipperary won by 4–28 to 2–17.

== Honours ==
Tipperary

- All-Ireland Under-20 Hurling Championship (1): 2019
- Munster Under-20 Hurling Championship (1): 2019
