= Darragh Stakelum =

Irish hurler

Personal information
- Native name: Darragh Steaclúm (Irish)
- Born: 2003 (age 22–23) Thurles, County Tipperary, Ireland
- Occupation: Student

Sport
- Sport: Hurling
- Position: Right corner-forward
Club
- Years: Club
- 2021–present: Thurles Sarsfields
Club titles
- Tipperary titles: 1
College
Years	College	Apps (scores)
2022–present	UCC	0
College titles
- Fitzgibbon titles: 0
Inter-county*
Years	County	Apps (scores)
2024–present	Tipperary	14 (0-08)
Inter-county titles
- Munster titles: 0
- All-Irelands: 1
- NHL: 0
- All Stars: 0
- *Inter County team apps and scores correct as of match played 24 May 2026.

Darragh Stakelum (born 2003) is an Irish hurler. At club level, he plays with Thurles Sarsfields and at inter-county level with the Tipperary senior hurling team.

== Career ==
Stakelum played hurling at all grades, including the Dr Harty Cup, during his time as a student at Thurles CBS. He later became a regular player with University College Cork in the Fitzgibbon Cup. At club level, Stakleum has lined out at senior level with the Thurles Sarsfields hurlers since 2021, however, as a Gaelic footballer, he won a Tipperary IFC medal in 2025.

At inter-county level, Stakelum first played for Tipperary as a member of the minor team in 2020. He later spent three consecutive seasons with the under-20 team, but ended his underage career without silverware. Stakelum made his senior team debut against Dublin in the 2024 National Hurling League. He won an All-Ireland SHC medal after coming on as a substitute for his brother, Conor Stakelum, in the 3–27 to 1–18 win over Cork in the 2025 All-Ireland SHC final.

== Personal life ==
His father, Conor Stakelum, was part of Tipperary's All-Ireland SHC–winning team in 1991.

== Career statistics ==
As of match played 24 May 2026

Team	Year	National League			Munster		All-Ireland		Total	
Team	Year	Division	Apps	Score	Apps	Score	Apps	Score	Apps	Score
Tipperary	2024	Division 1B	4	0-01	4	0-03	-		8	0-04
Tipperary	2025	Division 1A	3	0-04	4	0-01	3	0-02	10	0-07
Tipperary	2026	Division 1A	5	1-03	3	0-02	0	0-00	8	1-05
Career total			12	1-08	11	0-06	3	0-02	26	1-16

== Honours ==
Thurles Sarsfields

- Tipperary Intermediate Football Championship: 2025
- Tipperary Senior Hurling Championship (1): 2026

Tipperary

- All-Ireland Senior Hurling Championship: 2025
