= Sarah Mulkerrins =

Irish sports broadcaster and journalist

- Born: 1983 or 1984 (age 41–42)
- Education: Dublin City University
- Occupation: Sports broadcaster

Sarah Mulkerrins is an Irish sports broadcaster and journalist.

== Career ==
Mulkerrins grew up in Athenry, County Galway, Ireland and studied communications at Dublin City University.

She started her career as an assistant producer at Setanta Sports in 2008 and moved to the BBC in 2011. During her time at the BBC, she was a regular presence on various sports broadcasts, covering major events like the Olympics and World Cups, as well as being the lead GAA presenter. She has also reported on golf for the BBC.

In January 2023, she transitioned to freelance journalism.
