= Sam O'Farrell =

Irish hurler (born 2005)

Personal information
- Born: 2005 (age 20–21) Nenagh, County Tipperary, Ireland
- Occupation: Medical student

Sport
- Sport: Hurling
- Position: Midfield
Club
- Years: Club
- 2023–: Nenagh Éire Óg
Club titles
- Tipperary titles: 0
College
- Years: College
- 2024–: University of Galway
College titles
- Fitzgibbon titles: 0
Inter-county*
Years	County	Apps (scores)
2024–	Tipperary	8 (1-04)
Inter-county titles
- Munster titles: 0
- All-Irelands: 1
- NHL: 0
- All Stars: 0
- *Inter County team apps and scores correct as of match played 20 July 2025.

Sam O'Farrell (born 2005) is an Irish hurler. At club level he plays with Nenagh Éire Óg and at inter-county level was included in the training panel of the Tipperary senior hurling team.

== Career ==
O'Farrell is a former pupil of Glenstal Abbey School. At club level, O'Farrell first played for Nenagh Éire Óg at juvenile and underage levels before eventually joining the club's senior team. He had his first success in 2023 when he claimed a North Tipperary SHC title after a 0–21 to 0–17 defeat of Kiladangan in the final.

O'Farrell first appeared on the inter-county scene for Tipperary at the age of 17 when he captained the minor team that won the All-Ireland MHC title after a defeat of Offaly in 2022. He ended the season by being named on the Team of the Year. O'Farrell progressed to the under-20 team and was an All-Ireland U20HC runner-up as vice-captain of the team in 2024.

On 31 May 2025, O'Farrell captained Tipperary to win the 2025 All-Ireland Under-20 Hurling Championship after a 3–19 to 1–16 win against Kilkenny in the final. He became the first Tipperary player to captain the county to both All-Ireland minor and U20 titles.

O'Farrell was called up to the senior team's training panel in December 2024. He was later included on Tipperary's 38-player panel for the 2025 National Hurling League and was named at wing-back for their opening game against Galway in January 2025.

On 20 July in the 2025 All-Ireland final, O'Farrell started in the half-forward line as Tipperary defeated Cork by 3–27 to 1-19 and claim a 29th All-Ireland title. This win completed the full set of Minor, Under-20, and Senior All-Ireland hurling titles.

== Career statistics ==
As of match played 20 July 2025

Team	Year	National League			Munster		All-Ireland		Total	
Team	Year	Division	Apps	Score	Apps	Score	Apps	Score	Apps	Score
Tipperary	2025	Division 1	3	0-07	4	0-01	4	1-03	11	1-11
Career total			3	0-07	4	0-01	4	1-03	11	1-11

== Honours ==
Nenagh Éire Óg

- North Tipperary Senior Hurling Championship: 2023

Tipperary

- All-Ireland Senior Hurling Championship: 2025
- All-Ireland Under-20 Hurling Championship: 2025 (c)
- Munster Under-20 Hurling Championship: 2024 (vc), 2025 (c)
- All-Ireland Minor Hurling Championship: 2022 (c)
- Munster Minor Hurling Championship: 2022 (c)

Sporting positions
Preceded by Ronan Connolly	Tipperary minor hurling team captain 2022	Succeeded by Jamie Ormond
Preceded by Ben Currivan	Tipperary under-20 hurling team captain 2025	Succeeded by Oisín O'Donoghue
Achievements
Preceded by Ben O'Connor; James O'Dwyer	All-Ireland Minor Hurling Final winning captain 2022	Succeeded by Eoghan Gunning
Preceded by Dan Bourke	All-Ireland Under-20 Hurling Final winning captain 2025	Succeeded by Incumbent
