= Conor Stakelum (Tipperary under-21 hurler) =

Irish hurler

Sport
- Sport: Hurling
- Position: Midfield
Club
- Years: Club
- Thurles Sarsfields
Inter-county*
Years	County	Apps (scores)
2022–	Tipperary	20 (0-18)
Inter-county titles
- Munster titles: 0
- All-Irelands: 1
- NHL: 0
- All Stars: 0
- *Inter County team apps and scores correct as of match played 24 May 2026.

Conor Stakelum is an Irish hurler who plays for club side Thurles Sarsfields and at inter-county level with the Tipperary senior hurling team. He is usually deployed as a corner-forward.

He is the son of former Tipperary hurler Conor Stakelum and the brother of current Tipperary hurler Darragh Stakelum.

== Career ==
Stakelum made his league debut for Tipperary on 5 February 2022 against Laois when he came on as a substitute in the second half.

On 20 July in the 2025 All-Ireland final, Stakelum started in midfield as Tipperary defeated Cork by 3-27 to 1-19 and claim a 29th All-Ireland title.

== Career statistics ==
As of match played 24 May 2026

Team	Year	National League			Munster		All-Ireland		Total	
Team	Year	Division	Apps	Score	Apps	Score	Apps	Score	Apps	Score
Tipperary	2022	Division 1			4	0-02	-		4	0-02
Tipperary	2023	Division 1			4	0-01	2	0-06	6	0-07
Tipperary	2024	Division 1			1	0-00	-		1	0-00
Tipperary	2025	Division 1			3	0-00	3	0-04	6	0-04
Tipperary	2026	Division 1			3	0-05	-		3	0-05
Career total					15	0-08	5	0-10	20	0-18

== Honours ==
Tipperary

- All-Ireland Senior Hurling Championship (1): 2025
- All-Ireland Under-21 Hurling Championship (1): 2018
- All-Ireland Minor Hurling Championship (1): 2016
- Munster Minor Hurling Championship (1): 2016

Thurles Sarsfields

- Tipperary Senior Hurling Championship (2) 2017, 2026 (C)
