= Seán Twomey =

Irish hurler

Personal information
- Native name: Seám Ó Tuama (Irish)
- Born: 2000 (age 25–26) Ballinadee, County Cork, Ireland
- Occupation: Secondary school teacher

Sport
- Sport: Hurling
- Position: Left wing-forward
Club
- Years: Club
- 2018-present: Courcey Rovers
Club titles
- Cork titles: 0
College
- Years: College
- 2019-2023: University of Limerick
College titles
- Fitzgibbon titles: 2
Inter-county
- Years: County
- 2019-2024: Cork
Inter-county titles
- Munster titles: 0
- All-Irelands: 0
- NHL: 0
- All Stars: 0

Seán Twomey (born 2000) is an Irish hurler who plays for Cork Senior A Championship club Courcey Rovers and at inter-county level with the Cork senior hurling team. He usually lines out as a left wing-forward.

== Playing career ==
=== Courcey Rovers ===
Twomey joined the Courcey Rovers club at a young age and played in all grades at juvenile and underage levels. On 10 October 2015, he lined out at left wing-forward when Courcey Rovers suffered a 1–14 to 2–10 defeat by Ahan Gaels in the Minor A Championship final.

On 22 April 2018, Twomey made his first appearance for the club's top adult team in the Premier Intermediate Championship. He scored a hat-trick of goals in the 3–18 to 0–19 defeat of Inniscarra. On 21 October 2018, Twomey scored two points from left corner-forward when Courcey Rovers drew 0–12 to 1–09 with Charleville in the final. He was switched to right wing-forward for the replay a week later but ended on the losing side after a 0–15 to 0–14 defeat. Three years later on the 27 November 2021 Twomeys side got to another Premier Intermediate Final played in Pairc Uí Choaimh in an incredible comeback from 8 points down against Castlelyons to go on to win 1–19 to 1–18 with Twomey scoring 2 points to earn Twomey a championship medal.

Twomeys side went on to get into the Munster Intermediate Final in the same year after a late rally of points to send it to extra time to go on and lose to Kilmoyley of Kerry 0–24 to 0–21 with Twomey scoring 1 point played in the Gaelic Grounds.

Twomeys side yet again got to another final in the 2022 Senior A final just after winning Premier Intermediate year prior but lost to a very talented Fr. O'Neill's 0–20 to 2-12 played in Pairc Uí Choaimh with Twomey being held scoreless.

=== Cork ===
==== Under-17 and under-20 ====
Twomey first lined out for Cork as a member of the under-17 team during the 2017 Munster Championship. He made his first appearance for the team at midfield on 11 April in a 0–16 to 0–06 defeat of Limerick. On 25 April 2017, Twomey won a Munster Championship medal after a 3–13 to 1–12 defeat of Waterford in the final. He was again at midfield for Cork's 1–19 to 1-17 All-Ireland final defeat of Dublin at Croke Park on 6 August 2017.

On 3 July 2019, Twomey made his first appearance for Cork's inaugural under-20 team in the Munster Championship. He came on as a 39th-minute substitute for Simon Kennefick in the 1–20 to 0–16 defeat of Limerick. On 23 July 2019, Twomey top-scored for Cork with 1-02 from left wing-forward in a 3–15 to 2–17 defeat by Tipperary in the Munster final. He was selected at right wing-forward when Cork faced Tipperary for a second time in the All-Ireland final on 24 August 2019, however, he ended the game on the losing side after a 5–17 to 1–18 defeat.

==== Senior ====
On 20 December 2019, Twomey made his first appearance for the Cork senior team when he was selected at left wing-forward for Cork's Munster League game against Kerry. He scored four points from play in the 1–27 to 0–11 victory. Twomey made his first National League appearance on 26 January 2020 when he was introduced as a 60th-minute substitute for Conor Lehane in a 1–24 to 3-17 first round defeat by Waterford.

== Career statistics ==
=== Club ===
As of 21 September 2025.

Team	Year	Cork PIHC	
Team	Year	Apps	Score
Courcey Rovers	2018	7	4-11
Courcey Rovers	2019	2	1-03
Courcey Rovers	2020	2	1-00
Courcey Rovers	2021	5	2-08
Courcey Rovers	Total	16	8-22
Courcey Rovers	Year	Cork SAHC	
Courcey Rovers	Year	Apps	Score
Courcey Rovers	2022	5	6-03
Courcey Rovers	2023	3	0-06
Courcey Rovers	2024	3	1-04
Courcey Rovers	2025	0	0-00
Courcey Rovers	Total	11	7-13
Career total		27	15-35

=== Inter-county ===
As of match played 31 July 2021.

Team	Year	National League			Munster		All-Ireland		Total	
Team	Year	Division	Apps	Score	Apps	Score	Apps	Score	Apps	Score
Cork	2020	Division 1A	2	0-00	0	0-00	0	0-00	2	0-00
Cork	2021	Division 1A	3	0-01	0	0-00	0	0-00	3	0-01
Career total			5	0-01	0	0-00	0	0-00	5	0-01

== Honours ==
University of Limerick

- Fitzgibbon Cup: 2022, 2023

Cork

- All-Ireland Under-20 Hurling Championship: 2020
- Munster Under-20 Hurling Championship: 2020
- All-Ireland Under-17 Hurling Championship: 2017
- Munster Under-17 Hurling Championship: 2017
