= Eoin Roche =

Irish hurler

Personal information
- Native name: Eoin de Róiste (Irish)
- Born: July 2000 (age 26) Rathcormac, County Cork, Ireland
- Occupation: Student
- Height: 6 ft 0 in (183 cm)

Sport
- Sport: Hurling
- Position: Corner Back
Club*
Years	Club	Apps (scores)
2018-present	Bride Rovers	5 (1-09)
Club titles
- Cork titles: 0
Inter-county**
Years	County	Apps (scores)
2019-present	Cork	0 (0-00)
Inter-county titles
- Munster titles: 0
- All-Irelands: 0
- NHL: 1
- All Stars: 0
- * club appearances and scores correct as of 12:45, 11 January 2020. **Inter County team apps and scores correct as of 18:09, 20 December 2019.

Eoin Roche (born 2000) is an Irish hurler who plays for Cork Championship club Bride Rovers and at inter-county level with the Cork senior hurling team. He usually lines out as a right wing-forward.

== Playing career ==
=== Bride Rovers ===
Roche joined the Bride Rovers club at a young age and played in all grades at juvenile and underage levels. On 9 December 2018, he was at midfield when the Bride Rovers under-21 team qualified for the Under-21 A Championship final. Roche ended the game with a winners' medal after the 1–14 to 1–10 defeat of CLoughduv.

On 22 April 2018, Roche made his first appearance for the Bride Rovers senior team in the 2018 Cork Senior Championship. He scored 1-01 from play in the 4–21 to 2–13 defeat by Erin's Own.

=== St Colman’s College, Fermoy ===
Roche played at various levels during his tenure as a student at St. Colman's College, Fermoy. After winning the Cork Colleges U16A Hurling County title in third year. Roche stepped up to represent both the Colleges Junior and Senior teams in his 4th year “transition year”. He was appointed captain of the Junior team alongside his twin brother Brian in the 2016/17 campaign. A team primed with 14 transition year students on the starting 15 would win the school its first Dean Ryan Cup title after a replay win over Thurles CBS, 2–12 to 1–13. This win was hugely important for the Colleges ambitions to return to the top table as it was a first Dean Ryan Cup success since the 2002/03 school year when boarders were still part of the Colleges teams. Roche central to the Dean Ryan Success and was selected for the Dr Harty Cup starting side of 2016/17. The college avenged Semi Final heartbreak from the year prior 2015/16, and would reach the penultimate stage after a 1–08 to 0–07 defeat of fierce rivals Midleton CBS in the Semi Final stages. This all the more impressive as St Colman's would win a trilogy of encounters over the Imokilly hurling nursery at Senior level that year after a first round Harty Cup win 2–15 to 1-14 was followed up by a Dr O’ Callaghan Cup Final loss 0–11 to 0–10. Midleton CBS outfit the defending Rice Cup, White Cup and Dean Ryan Cup winners never losing in Munster up to Harty level and for the Harty title that year. Roche lined out at wingback on a young St Colman's outfit boasting 4 transition year students in the starting 15 in the Dr Harty Cup Final which fell short to Our Ladys Templemore on a scoreline of 2–22 to 1-06.

=== Cork ===
==== Under-17 and minor ====
Roche who played with cork all the way from u14 lined out for Cork as joint-captain of the under-17 team with his twin brother Brian during the 2017 Munster Championship. He made his first appearance for the team on 11 April in a 0–16 to 0–06 defeat of Limerick. On 25 April, Roche won a Munster Championship medal after a 3–13 to 1–12 defeat of Waterford in the final. He was again at right corner-back for Cork's 1–19 to 1-17 All-Ireland final defeat of Dublin at Croke Park on 6 August 2017.

Roche was also a member of the Cork minor team during the 2017 Munster Championship and made his first appearance on 3 May 2017 when he lined out at left corner-back in Cork's 1–24 to 0–08 defeat of Waterford. On 9 July 2017, he was again at left corner-back when Cork defeated Clare by 4–21 to 0–16 to win the Munster Championship for the first time since 2008. On 3 September 2017, Roche was in his now customary position of left corner-back when Cork faced Galway in the All-Ireland final, however, Cork were defeated by 2–17 to 2–15.

==== Under-21 and under-20 ====
Roche was drafted onto the Cork under-21 team for the 2018 Munster Championship. On 4 July 2018, he won a Munster Championship medal as an unused substitute after Cork's 2–23 to 1–13 defeat of Tipperary in the final. On 26 August 2018, Roche was again an unused substitute for Cork's 3–13 to 1-16 All-Ireland final defeat by Tipperary.

On 3 July 2019, Roche made his first appearance for Cork's inaugural under-20 team when he was selected at left corner-forward in the 1–20 to 0–16 defeat of Limerick. On 23 July 2019, he was again at left corner-back when Cork suffered a 3–15 to 2–17 defeat by Tipperary in the Munster final. Roche was again in his customary position when Cork faced Tipperary for a second time in the All-Ireland final on 24 August 2019. He ended the game on the losing side after a 5–17 to 1–18 defeat.

==== Senior ====
Roche first played for the Cork senior team when he was added to the panel during the 2020 Munster League. He made his first appearance for the team on 20 December 2019 when he was introduced as a 58th-minute substitute for Robbie O'Flynn at right wing-forward in Cork's 1–27 to 0–11 defeat of Kerry.

== Career statistics ==
=== Club ===
As of match played 11 August 2019.

Team	Year	Cork SHC	
Team	Year	Apps	Score
Bride Rovers	2018	3	1-07
Bride Rovers	2019	2	0-02
Bride Rovers	Total	5	1-09
Bride Rovers	Year	Cork SAHC	
Bride Rovers	Year	Apps	Score
Bride Rovers	2020	0	0-00
Bride Rovers	Total	0	0-00
Career total		5	1-09

== Honours ==
Bride Rovers

- Cork Premier 2 Minor Hurling Championship (1): Winner 2018
- Cork Premier 2 Under-21 Hurling Championship (0): Runners-Up 2019

St Colman's College, Fermoy

- Dean Ryan Cup 2016/17 Winner
- Dr Harty Cup 2016/17 Finalist

Cork

- National Hurling League: 2025
- All-Ireland Under-20 Hurling Championship (1): 2020
- Munster Under-21 Hurling Championship (1): 2018
- Munster Under-20 Hurling Championship (1): 2020
- Munster Minor Hurling Championship (1): 2017
- All-Ireland Under-17 Hurling Championship (1): 2017
- Munster Under-17 Hurling Championship (1): 2017 (c)

Sporting positions
Preceded by New position	Cork Under-17 Hurling Team Joint-Captain; 2017	Succeeded by Position abolished
Achievements
Preceded by New position	All-Ireland Under-17 Hurling Final winning joint-captain 2017	Succeeded by Position abolished
