= Shane O'Regan =

Irish hurler

Personal information
- Native name: Seán Ó Ríogáin (Irish)
- Born: 2000 (age 25–26) Glenville, County Cork, Ireland

Sport
- Sport: Hurling
- Position: Full-forward
Clubs
Years	Club	Apps (scores)
2018-2021 2019-2021 2022-	Watergrasshill → Imokilly; Sarsfields	15 (5-22)
Club titles
- Cork titles: 2
- Munster titles: 1
Inter-county*
Years	County	Apps (scores)
2019-2020	Cork	0 (0-00)
Inter-county titles
- Munster titles: 0
- All-Irelands: 0
- NHL: 0
- All Stars: 0
- *Inter County team apps and scores correct as of 15:41, 28 December 2019.

Shane O'Regan (born 2000) is an Irish hurler who plays for Cork Championship club Sarsfields, and at inter-county level with the Cork senior hurling team. He usually lines out as a full-forward.

== Playing career ==
=== Imokilly ===
O'Regan was added to the Imokilly divisional team in advance of the 2019 Cork Championship. He made a number of appearances throughout the game and was selected as a substitute when Imokilly faced Glen Rovers in the final on 20 October 2019. O'Regan was introduced as a 53rd-minute substitute and claimed a winners' medal after scoring a point in the 2–17 to 1–16 victory.

=== Cork ===
==== Under-17 and under-20 ====
O'Regan first lined out for Cork when he was added to the extended panel of the Cork under-17 team for the 2017 Munster Championship. He remained a member of the extended panel throughout the campaign which saw Cork claim the Munster Championship after a 3–13 to 1–12 defeat of Waterford in the final. On 6 August 2017, O'Regan made the team's match-day panel when he was selected amongst the substitutes for the All-Ireland final against Dublin. He remained on the bench throughout the game but claimed a winners' medal after the 1–19 to 1–17 victory.

On 3 July 2019, O'Regan made his first appearance for Cork's inaugural under-20 team in the Munster Championship. He scored 1-06 from full-forward in the 1–20 to 0–16 defeat of Limerick. On 23 July 2019, O'Regan scored three points from play in a 3–15 to 2–17 defeat by Tipperary in the Munster final. He was again selected at full-forward when Cork faced Tipperary for a second time in the All-Ireland final on 24 August 2019, however, he ended the game on the losing side after a 5–17 to 1–18 defeat.

==== Senior ====
On 29 December 2019, O'Regan had his first involvement with the Cork senior team when he was selected amongst the substitutes for Cork's Munster League game against Waterford.

== Career statistics ==
As of 16 November 2025.

Team	Year	Cork PIHC		Munster		All-Ireland		Total	
Team	Year	Apps	Score	Apps	Score	Apps	Score	Apps	Score
Watergrasshill	2018	3	1-05	—		—		3	1-05
Watergrasshill	2019	2	0-06	—		—		2	0-06
Watergrasshill	2020	4	2-12	—		—		4	2-12
Watergrasshill	2021	4	3-30	—		—		4	3-30
Watergrasshill	Total	13	6-53	—		—		13	6-53
	Year	Cork PSHC		Munster		All-Ireland		Total	
	Year	Apps	Score	Apps	Score	Apps	Score	Apps	Score
Sarsfields	2022	3	0-07	—		—		3	0-07
Sarsfields	2023	4	1-02	1	0-00	—		5	1-02
Sarsfields	2024	5	2-09	2	2-04	2	0-01	9	4-14
Sarsfields	2025	6	0-05	1	0-00	—		7	0-05
Sarsfields	Total	18	3-23	4	2-04	2	0-01	24	5-28
Career total		31	9-76	4	2-04	2	0-01	37	11-81

== Honours ==
Watergrasshill

- Cork Premier 2 Under-16 Hurling Championship: 2016

Sarsfields

- Munster Senior Club Hurling Championship: 2024
- Cork Premier Senior Hurling Championship: 2023

Imokilly

- Cork Senior Hurling Championship: 2019

Cork

- All-Ireland Under-20 Hurling Championship: 2020
- Munster Under-20 Hurling Championship: 2019
- All-Ireland Under-17 Hurling Championship: 2017
- Munster Under-17 Hurling Championship: 2017
