= Tommy O'Connell (Cork hurler) =

Irish hurler (born 2000)

Personal information
- Native name: Tomás Ó Conaill (Irish)
- Born: 2000 (age 25–26) Midleton, County Cork, Ireland
- Occupation: Barista
- Height: 6 ft 7 in (201 cm)

Sport
- Sport: Hurling
- Position: Right wing-forward
Club*
Years	Club	Apps (scores)
2018-present	Midleton	31 (4-16)
Club titles
- Cork titles: 1
College(s)
- Years: College
- 2018-2019 2019-2022: University of Limerick; University College Cork
College titles
- Fitzgibbon titles: 1
Inter-county**
Years	County	Apps (scores)
2019-present	Cork	16 (0-02)
Inter-county titles
- Munster titles: 1
- All-Irelands: 0
- NHL: 1
- All Stars: 0
- * club appearances and scores correct as of 20:30, 6 October 2024. **Inter County team apps and scores correct as of 16:44, 9 June 2025.

Thomas O'Connell (born 2000) is an Irish hurler. At club level, he plays with Midleton and at inter-county level with the Cork senior hurling team.

== Early life ==
Born and raised in Midleton, County Cork, O'Connell first played hurling to a high standard as a student at Christian Brothers College, Cork. He progressed through the various age grades before eventually joining the school's senior team and lined out in several Harty Cup campaigns. O'Connell later studied at University of Limerick and won an All-Ireland Freshers' Championship medal in 2019 after scoring nine points from corner-forward in the 3–17 to 1–10 win over Limerick Institute of Technology. He subsequently transferred to University College Cork and was part of their Fitzgibbon Cup-winning panel in 2020.

== Club career ==
O'Connell began his club career at juvenile and underage levels with the Midleton club in East Cork. He captained the club's under-14 team to the Cork Féile na nGael title in 2014, before later collecting Premier 1 U16HC and Premier 1 MHC titles in 2016 and 2018 respectively.

O'Connell was in his last year of the minor grade when he made his senior team debut. He came on as a 43rd-minute substitute in the 4–19 to 1–18 defeat by Imokilly in the final in October 2018. O'Connell won a Cork PSHC medal in November 2021 following Midleton's 0–24 to 1–18 win over Glen Rovers in the final. He was on the losing side in a final for a second time in October 2023 when Sarsfields beat Midleton by two points.

== Inter-county career ==
O'Connell first played for Cork as a member of the under-17 team during the holding of a one-off special championship in 2017. He won a Munster U17HC medal in this grade after a defeat of Waterford, before lining out at wing-forward in Cork's subsequent 1–19 to 1–17 defeat of Dublin in the All-Ireland final. After a year with no inter-county activity, O'Connell joined Cork's under-20 team in 2019. He ended the season without success, as Cork were beaten by Tipperary in the Munster and All-Ireland finals. O'Connell was again eligible for the under-20 grade the following year and he claimed Munster and All-Ireland U20HC medals after respective defeats of Tipperary and Dublin.

O'Connell was added to the senior team in January 2019 and was listed amongst the substitute for Cork's defeat by Kilkenny in the National League later that month. He was on and off the team for a number of years before becoming a more regular panel member in 2022. O'Connell came on as a substitute for Robert Downey in Cork's 3–29 to 1–34 extra-time defeat by Clare in the 2024 All-Ireland final.

O'Connell claimed his first senior silverware in April 2025 when Cork won the National Hurling League title following a 3–24 to 0–23 win over Tipperary in the final. This was later followed by a Munster SHC medal after Cork's penalty shootout defeat of Limerick in the 2025 Munster final.

== Career statistics ==
=== Club ===
As of 6 October 2024

Team	Year	Cork		Munster		All-Ireland		Total	
Team	Year	Apps	Score	Apps	Score	Apps	Score	Apps	Score
Midleton	2018	4	0-02	1	0-00	—		5	0-02
Midleton	2019	3	2-02	—		—		3	2-02
Midleton	2020	3	0-05	—		—		3	0-05
Midleton	2021	6	0-02	1	1-00	—		7	1-02
Midleton	2022	3	1-00	—		—		3	1-00
Midleton	2023	5	0-02	—		—		5	0-02
Midleton	2024	5	0-03	—		—		5	0-03
Career total		29	3-16	2	1-00	—		31	4-16

=== Inter-county ===
As of 5 April 2026

Team	Year	National League			Munster		All-Ireland		Total	
Team	Year	Division	Apps	Score	Apps	Score	Apps	Score	Apps	Score
Cork	2019	Division 1A	0	0-00	0	0-00	0	0-00	0	0-00
Cork	2020	Division 1A	0	0-00	0	0-00	0	0-00	0	0-00
Cork	2021	Division 1A	0	0-00	0	0-00	0	0-00	0	0-00
Cork	2022	Division 1A	1	0-00	3	0-00	2	0-00	6	0-00
Cork	2023	Division 1A	5	0-01	3	0-00	—		8	0-01
Cork	2024	Division 1A	4	1-03	3	0-00	2	0-00	9	1-03
Cork	2025	Division 1A	3	0-02	3	0-02	2	0-00	8	0-04
Cork	2026	Division 1A	6	0-07	0	0-00	0	0-00	6	0-07
Total			19	1-13	12	0-02	6	0-00	37	1-15

== Honours ==
University of Limerick

- All-Ireland Freshers' Hurling Championship: 2019

Midleton

- Cork Premier Senior Hurling Championship: 2021
- Rebel Óg Premier 1 Minor Hurling Championship: 2018
- Rebel Óg Premier 1 Under-16 Hurling Championship: 2016
- Cork Féile na nGael: 2014 (c)

Cork

- Munster Senior Hurling Championship: 2025
- National Hurling League: 2025
- Canon O'Brien Cup: 2019
- All-Ireland Under-20 Hurling Championship: 2020
- Munster Under-20 Hurling Championship: 2020
- All-Ireland Under-17 Hurling Championship: 2017
- Munster Under-17 Hurling Championship: 2017
