= Cormac O'Brien (hurler) =

Irish hurler

Personal information
- Native name: Cormac Ó Briain (Irish)
- Born: 2001 (age 24–25) Newtownshandrum, County Cork, Ireland
- Occupation: Audit associate
- Height: 6 ft 1 in (185 cm)

Sport
- Sport: Hurling
- Position: Right wing-back
Club
- Years: Club
- 2019-present: Newtownshandrum
Club titles
- Cork titles: 0
College
- Years: College
- 2020-2024: University College Cork
College titles
- Fitzgibbon titles: 0
Inter-county*
Years	County	Apps (scores)
2021-present	Cork	0 (0-00)
Inter-county titles
- Munster titles: 1
- All-Irelands: 0
- NHL: 1
- All Stars: 0
- *Inter County team apps and scores correct as of 23:10, 5 June 2021.

Cormac O'Brien (born 2001), is an Irish hurler who plays as a defender for club side Newtownshandrum and at inter-county level with the Cork senior hurling team.

== Career ==
O'Brien first came to prominence at juvenile and underage levels with the Newtownshandrum club before joining the club's senior team in 2019. As a schoolboy at CBS Charleville he also lined out in various hurling competitions including the Harty Cup. O'Brien first appeared on the inter-county scene as a half back on the Cork under-17 team that won the one-off All-Ireland Under-17 Championship in 2017. A year with the Cork minor team followed before he won consecutive All-Ireland Under-20 Championships in 2020 and as team captain in 2021. O'Brien joined the Cork senior hurling team as a member of the extended training panel in 2021 and made his debut in the National League against Limerick.

== Career statistics ==
As of match played 5 June 2021.

Team	Year	National League			Munster		All-Ireland		Total	
Team	Year	Division	Apps	Score	Apps	Score	Apps	Score	Apps	Score
Cork	2021	Division 1A	1	0-00	0	0-00	0	0-00	1	0-00
Career total			1	0-00	0	0-00	0	0-00	1	0-00

== Honours ==
Cork

- Munster Senior Hurling Championship: 2025
- National Hurling League: 2025
- All-Ireland Under-20 Hurling Championship: 2020, 2021 (c)
- Munster Under-20 Hurling Championship : 2020, 2021 (c)
- All-Ireland Under-17 Hurling Championship: 2017
- Munster Under-17 Hurling Championship: 2017

Sporting positions
Preceded by Conor O'Callaghan	Cork Under-20 Hurling Team Captain; 2021	Succeeded by Jack Cahalane
Achievements
Preceded by Conor O'Callaghan	All-Ireland Under-20 Hurling Final winning captain 2021	Succeeded by Pádraic Moylan
