= Eoin Carey =

Irish hurler

Personal information
- Native name: Eoin Ó Ciardha (Irish)
- Born: 2000 (age 25–26) Kilworth, County Cork, Ireland
- Occupation: Student

Sport
- Sport: Hurling
- Position: Midfield
Club
- Years: Club
- Kilworth
Club titles
- Cork titles: 0
Inter-county*
Years	County	Apps (scores)
2020-	Cork	0 (0-00)
Inter-county titles
- Munster titles: 0
- All-Irelands: 0
- NHL: 0
- All Stars: 0
- *Inter County team apps and scores correct as of 18:09, 11 January 2020.

Eoin Carey (born 2000) is an Irish hurler who plays for Cork Championship club Kilworth and at inter-county level with the Cork senior hurling team. He usually lines out as a midfielder.

== Honours ==
Cork

- All-Ireland Under-20 Hurling Championship (1): 2020
- Munster Under-20 Hurling Championship (1): 2020
- All-Ireland Under-17 Hurling Championship (1): 2017
- Munster Under-17 Hurling Championship (1): 2017
