= Daire Connery =

Irish hurler (born 2000)

Personal information
- Native name: Daire Ó Conaire (Irish)
- Born: 2000 (age 25–26) Cork, Ireland
- Occupation: Student
- Height: 6 ft 0 in (183 cm)

Sport
- Sport: Hurling
- Position: Left wing-forward
Club
- Years: Club
- 2018-present: Na Piarsaigh
Club titles
- Cork titles: 0
College
- Years: College
- University College Cork
College titles
- Fitzgibbon titles: 0
Inter-county*
Years	County	Apps (scores)
2020-	Cork	1 (0-00)
Inter-county titles
- Munster titles: 0
- All-Irelands: 0
- NHL: 0
- All Stars: 0
- *Inter County team apps and scores correct as of 21:52, 31 July 2021.

Daire Connery (born 2000) is an Irish hurler who plays for Premier Senior Championship club Na Piarsaigh and at inter-county level with the Cork senior hurling team. He usually lines out as a left wing-forward.

== Playing career ==
=== Na Piarsaigh ===
Son of Christy Connery and Susan Connery (Formerly Aher), a stalwart of the Na Piarsaigh club on the northside of Cork city, Connery first played hurling at juvenile and underage levels with the same club. He was a member of the half-back line when the club's minor team defeated Killeagh-St. Ita's by 5–09 to 0–10 to win the Cork Premier 1 MHC title in 2016.

On 29 April 2018, Connery made his debut with the Na Piarsaigh senior team in a 2–15 to 0–15 defeat by Bandon in the 2018 Cork County Championship.

=== Cork ===
==== Under-17 and minor ====
Connery first lined out for Cork as a member of the under-17 team during the 2017 Munster Championship. He made his first appearance at right corner-back on 11 April in a 0–16 to 0–06 defeat of Limerick. On 25 April, Connery scored four points and claimed the Munster Championship title after a 3–13 to 1–12 defeat of Waterford in the final. He was again included on the starting fifteen, this time at midfield, for Cork's 1–19 to 1-17 All-Ireland final defeat of Dublin on 6 August.

As well as being a member of the Cork under-17 team in 2017, Connery was also in his second year as a member of the Cork minor team. On 9 July, he was at midfield when Cork defeated Clare by 4–21 to 0–16 to win the Munster Championship for the first time since 2008. On 3 September, Connery was again at midfield when Cork suffered a 2–17 to 2-15 All-Ireland final defeat by Galway.

==== Under-21 and under-20 ====
Connery was still just 18-years-old when he was drafted onto the Cork under-21 team. He won a Munster Championship medal on 4 July 2018, after coming on as a substitute in Cork's 2–23 to 1–13 defeat of Tipperary in the final. On 26 August 2018, Connery was an unused substitute in Cork's 3–13 to 1-16 All-Ireland final defeat by Tipperary.

On 3 July 2019, Connery made his first appearance for Cork's inaugural under-20 team in the Munster Championship. He scored three points, including a sideline cut, in the 1–20 to 0–16 defeat of Limerick. On 23 July 2019, Connery was again at midfield when Cork suffered a 3–15 to 2–17 defeat by Tipperary in the Munster final. He was selected at left wing-forward when Cork faced Tipperary for a second time that year in the All-Ireland final on 24 August 2019. Connery ended the game on the losing side after a 5–17 to 1–18 defeat.

==== Senior ====
Connery was brought onto the Cork senior panel during the 2020 National League. He made the match-day panel for the first time for Cork's group stage game against Limerick on 23 February 2020. Connery was later included on Cork's Munster Championship panel and made his debut as a late replacement at left wing-forward for Aidan Walsh in a 1–28 to 1–24 defeat by Waterford.

== Career statistics ==
=== Inter-county ===
As of match played 31 July 2021.

Team	Year	National League			Munster		All-Ireland		Total	
Team	Year	Division	Apps	Score	Apps	Score	Apps	Score	Apps	Score
Cork	2020	Division 1A	0	0-00	1	0-00	0	0-00	1	0-00
Cork	2021	Division 1A	3	0-04	0	0-00	0	0-00	3	0-04
Career total			3	0-04	1	0-00	0	0-00	4	0-04

== Honours ==
Na Piarsaigh

- Cork Premier 1 Minor Hurling Championship (1): 2016

Cork

- All-Ireland Under-20 Hurling Championship (1): 2020
- Munster Under-21 Hurling Championship (1): 2018
- Munster Under-20 Hurling Championship (1): 2020
- Munster Minor Hurling Championship (1): 2017
- All-Ireland Under-17 Hurling Championship (1): 2017
- Munster Under-17 Hurling Championship (1): 2017
