= Eoin Davis =

Irish hurler

Personal information
- Native name: Eoin Dáibhís (Irish)
- Born: 2000 (age 25–26) Ballynoe, County Cork, Ireland

Sport
- Sport: Hurling
- Position: Goalkeeper
Clubs
- Years: Club
- 2018-present 2022-present: St Catherine's → Imokilly
Club titles
- Cork titles: 1
College
- Years: College
- 2018-2022: University of Limerick
College titles
- Fitzgibbon titles: 1
Inter-county*
Years	County	Apps (scores)
2021-2022	Cork	0 (0-00)
Inter-county titles
- Munster titles: 0
- All-Irelands: 0
- NHL: 0
- All Stars: 0
- *Inter County team apps and scores correct as of 22:48, 21 May 2021.

Eoin Davis (born 2000) is an Irish hurler who plays as a goalkeeper for club side St Catherine's and at inter-county level with the Cork senior hurling team.

== Honours ==
University of Limerick

- Fitzgibbon Cup: 2022

St Catherine's

- Munster Junior Club Hurling Championship: 2023

Imokilly

- Cork Premier Senior Hurling Championship: 2024

Cork

- All-Ireland Under-20 Hurling Championship: 2020
- Munster Under-20 Hurling Championship: 2020
- All-Ireland Under-17 Hurling Championship: 2017
- Munster Under-17 Hurling Championship: 2017
