= List of Cork under-20 hurling team captains =

This article lists players who have captained the Cork under-20 hurling team in the Munster Under-20 Hurling Championship and the All-Ireland Under-20 Hurling Championship. Prior to 2019 the competition had an under-21 age limit.

== List of captains ==
Year	Player	Club	National	Provincial
1996	Seánie McGrath	Glen Rovers		Munster Hurling Final winning captain
1997	Dan Murphy	Ballincollig	All-Ireland Hurling Final winning captain	Munster Hurling Final winning captain
1998	Dan Murphy	Ballincollig	All-Ireland Hurling Final winning captain	Munster Hurling Final winning captain
1999	Ben O'Connor	Newtownshandrum		
2000				
2001	Jason Barrett	Carrigtwohill		
2002				
2003	Kieran Murphy	Erin's Own		
2004	Kieran Murphy	Sarsfields		
2005	Pat Fitzgerald	Erin's Own		
2006	Stephen Cronin	Erin's Own		
2007	Shane O'Neill	Bishopstown		Munster Hurling Final winning captain
2008	Patrick Cronin	Bishopstown		
2009	Patrick Horgan	Glen Rovers		
2010	William Egan	Kilbrin		
2011	William Egan	Kilbrin		
2012	Conor Lehane	Midleton		
2013	Christopher Joyce	Na Piarsaigh		
2014	Killian Burke	Midleton		
2015	Conor Twomey	Newtownshandrum		
2016	Patrick Collins	Ballinhassig		
2017	Darren Browne	Kanturk		
2018	Shane Kingston	Douglas		Munster Hurling Final winning captain
2019	James Keating	Kildorrery		
2020	Conor O'Callaghan	Dromtarriffe	All-Ireland Hurling Final winning captain	Munster Hurling Final winning captain
2021	Cormac O'Brien	Newtownshandrum	All-Ireland Hurling Final winning captain	Munster Hurling Final winning captain
2022	Jack Cahalane	St. Finbarr's		
2023	Micheál Mullins	Whitechurch	All-Ireland Hurling Final winning captain	Munster Hurling Final winning captain
2024	Darragh O'Sullivan	Ballinhassig		
2025	Denis Cashman	Bride Rovers		

== See also ==
- List of Cork senior hurling team captains
- List of Cork minor hurling team captains
