= Conor O'Callaghan (hurler) =

Irish hurler (born 2000)

Personal information
- Native name: Conchúr Ó Ceallacháin (Irish)
- Born: 2000 (age 25–26) Rathcoole, County Cork, Ireland
- Occupation: Inside Sales Acting Manager Dairygold Co-Operative Society
- Height: 5 ft 11 in (180 cm)

Sport
- Sport: Hurling
- Position: Left corner-back
Club
- Years: Club
- Dromtarriffe
Club titles
- Cork titles: 0
Inter-county*
Years	County	Apps (scores)
2019-	Cork	0 (0-00)
Inter-county titles
- Munster titles: 0
- All-Irelands: 0
- NHL: 0
- All Stars: 0
- *Inter County team apps and scores correct as of 17:25, 23 February 2019.

Conor O'Callaghan (born 2000) is an Irish hurler who plays for Duhallow Junior Championship club Dromtarriffe and at inter-county level with the Cork senior hurling team. He usually lines out as a right corner-back.

== Playing career ==
=== Dromtarriffe ===
O'Callaghan joined the Dromtarriffe club at a young age and represented Keale Gaels, an amalgamation of Dromtarriffe and Millstreet, in all grades at juvenile and underage levels.

On 18 August 2017, O'Callaghan was at left corner-back for the Dromtarriffe junior football team faced St. Kevin's in the final of the Cork Under-21 C Championship. Dromtarriffe secured the title following a 1–14 to 2–08 victory.

On 16 September 2018, O'Callaghan was at centre-back when the Dromtarriffe junior hurling team faced Newmarket in the final of the Duhallow Junior Championship. He scored a point from play in the 2–17 to 0–16 victory as Dromtarriffe secured their first ever title in the grade.

=== Cork ===
==== Under-17 and minor ====
O'Callaghan first lined out for Cork as a member of the under-17 team during the 2017 Munster Championship. He made his first appearance at centre-back on 11 April in a 0–16 to 0–06 defeat of Limerick. On 25 April, O'Callaghan captained Cork to the Munster Championship title after a 3–13 to 1–12 defeat of Waterford in the final. He was again at centre-back for Cork's 1–19 to 1-17 All-Ireland final defeat of Dublin at Croke Park on 6 August.

As well as being a member of the Cork under-17 team in 2017, O'Callaghan was also selected for the Cork minor team and made his first appearance on 3 May in a 1–24 to 0–08 defeat of Waterford. On 9 July, he was at right corner-back when Cork defeated Clare by 4–21 to 0–16 to win the Munster Championship for the first time since 2008. On 3 September, O'Callaghan was again at right corner-back when Cork suffered a 2–17 to 2-15 All-Ireland final defeat by Galway.

==== Under-21 and under-20 ====
On 26 August 2018, O'Callaghan was named on the Cork under-21 team as a substitute for the All-Ireland final against Tipperary. He remained on the bench for the 3–13 to 1–16 defeat.

On 3 July 2019, O'Callaghan made his first appearance for Cork's inaugural under-20 team in the Munster Championship. He lined out at right corner-back in the 1–20 to 0–16 defeat of Limerick. On 23 July 2019, O'Callaghan again lined out at right corner-back when Cork suffered a 3–15 to 2–17 defeat by Tipperary in the Munster final. He was selected at right corner-back when Cork faced Tipperary for a second time in the All-Ireland final on 24 August 2019, however, he spent much of the game at centre-back. O'Callaghan ended the game on the losing side after a 5–17 to 1–18 defeat.

==== Senior ====
O'Callaghan made his first appearance for the Cork senior team on 2 January 2019 when he was introduced as a 25th-minute substitute for David Lowney in a 1–24 to 1–18 defeat by Waterford in the Munster Senior League. On 5 January, he was at left corner-back when Cork defeated University College Cork to win the Canon O'Brien Cup. O'Callaghan was added to the Cork senior hurling team for their National Hurling League game against Limerick on 24 February.

== Honours ==
Dromtarriffe

- Cork Junior Football Championship: 2018
- Duhallow Junior A Hurling Championship: 2018, 2020, 2021
- Cork Under-21 C Football Championship: 2017

Cork

- Canon O'Brien Cup: 2019
- All-Ireland Under-20 Hurling Championship: 2020 (c)
- Munster Under-20 Hurling Championship: 2020 (c)
- Munster Minor Hurling Championship: 2017
- All-Ireland Under-17 Hurling Championship: 2017
- Munster Under-17 Hurling Championship: 2017 (c)

Sporting positions
Preceded by James Keating	Cork Under-20 Hurling Team Captain; 2020	Succeeded by Cormac O'Brien
Achievements
Preceded by Craig Morgan	All-Ireland Under-20 Hurling Final winning captain 2020	Succeeded by Cormac O'Brien
