= Brian Roche (hurler) =

Irish hurler

Personal information
- Native name: Brian de Róiste (Irish)
- Born: 2000 (age 25–26) Rathcormac, County Cork, Ireland
- Occupation: Order processor
- Height: 6 ft 0 in (183 cm)

Sport
- Sport: Hurling
- Position: Centre-forward
Club*
Years	Club	Apps (scores)
2018-present	Bride Rovers	34 (11-70)
Club titles
- Cork titles: 0
College
- Years: College
- 2019-2023: MTU Cork
College titles
- Fitzgibbon titles: 0
Inter-county**
Years	County	Apps (scores)
2019-present	Cork	6 (0-03)
Inter-county titles
- Munster titles: 1
- All-Irelands: 0
- NHL: 1
- All Stars: 0
- * club appearances and scores correct as of 20:11, 12 February 2025. **Inter County team apps and scores correct as of 20:21, 9 March 2025.

Brian Roche (born 2000) is an Irish hurler. At club level, he plays with Bride Rovers and at inter-county level with the Cork senior hurling team.

== Career ==
Roche played hurling at all levels as a student at St Colman's College in Fermoy. After winning the Cork PPS U16AHC title in 2016, he co-captained the college, alongside his twin brother Eoin, to the Dean Ryan Cup title in 2017, after a 2–12 to 1–13 win over Thurles CBS in the final. Roche also lined out for St Colman's in the Dr Harty Cup.

After finishing his secondary schooling, Roche later lined out with MTU Cork in the Fitzgibbon Cup. At club level, he began his career at underage levels with Bride Rovers and won Cork Premier 2 MHC and Cork U21AHC medals in 2018. Roche also won an East Cork JAFC medal in 2021.

At inter-county level, Roche first appeared for Cork when he captained the under-17 team to the All-Ireland U17HC title in 2017, following a 1–19 to 1–17 defeat of Dublin in the final. He was also a member of Cork's minor team that year, and won a Munster MHC medal before defeat by Galway in the 2017 All-Ireland final. Roche was called into the under-21 panel for the All-Ireland series in 2018. His last game in the restructured under-20 grade saw him win an All-Ireland U20HC medal after a 2–19 to 1–18 win over Dublin in the 2020 All-Ireland under-20 final.

Roche first lined out for the senior team in a Munster SHL game against Kerry in December 2019.

== Career statistics ==
=== Club ===
As of 1 November 2025

Team	Year	Cork SHC	
Team	Year	Apps	Score
Bride Rovers	2018	3	1-07
Bride Rovers	2019	2	0-02
Bride Rovers	Total	5	1-09
Bride Rovers	Year	Cork SAHC	
Bride Rovers	Year	Apps	Score
Bride Rovers	2020	4	1-05
Bride Rovers	2021	5	1-15
Bride Rovers	2022	5	4-11
Bride Rovers	2023	4	0-06
Bride Rovers	2024	4	0-06
Bride Rovers	2025	7	4-18
Bride Rovers	Total	29	10-61
Career total		34	11-70

=== Inter-county ===
As of 9 March 2025.

Team	Year	National League			Munster		All-Ireland		Total	
Team	Year	Division	Apps	Score	Apps	Score	Apps	Score	Apps	Score
Cork	2020	Division 1A	0	0-00	0	0-00	0	0-00	0	0-00
Cork	2021	Division 1A	0	0-00	0	0-00	0	0-00	0	0-00
Cork	2022	Division 1A	2	0-00	1	0-00	0	0-00	3	0-00
Cork	2023	Division 1A	5	0-02	4	0-03	—		9	0-05
Cork	2024	Division 1A	5	0-01	1	0-00	0	0-00	6	0-01
Cork	2025	Division 1A	4	0-02	0	0-00	0	0-00	4	0-02
Career total			16	0-05	6	0-03	0	0-00	22	0-08

== Honours ==
St Colman's College

- Dean Ryan Cup: 2017
- Cork PPS Under-16 A Hurling Championship: 2016

Bride Rovers

- East Cork Junior A Football Championship: 2021
- Cork Under-21 A Hurling Championship: 2018
- Cork Premier 2 Minor Hurling Championship: 2018

Cork

- Munster Senior Hurling Championship: 2025
- National Hurling League: 2025
- All-Ireland Under-20 Hurling Championship: 2020
- Munster Under-20 Hurling Championship: 2020
- Munster Minor Hurling Championship: 2017
- All-Ireland Under-17 Hurling Championship: 2017 (c)
- Munster Under-17 Hurling Championship: 2017 (c)

Sporting positions
Preceded by New position	Cork under-17 hurling team joint-captain 2017	Succeeded by Position abolished
Achievements
Preceded by New position	All-Ireland Under-17 Hurling Final winning joint-captain 2017	Succeeded by Position abolished
