= 2020 All-Ireland Under-20 Hurling Championship final =

2020 All-Ireland Under-20 Hurling Championship Final
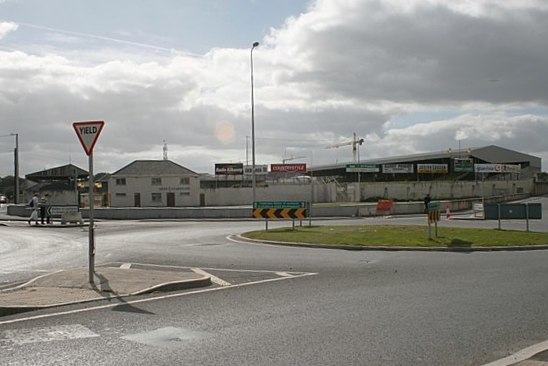
- Event: 2020 All-Ireland Under-20 Hurling Championship
Cork	Dublin
2–19	1–18
- Date: 10 July 2021
- Venue: UPMC Nowlan Park, Kilkenny
- Man of the Match: Brian Roche
- Referee: John Keenan (Wicklow)

The 2020 All-Ireland Under-20 Hurling Championship final was a hurling match that was played at UPMC Nowlan Park, Kilkenny on 10 July 2021 to determine the winners of the 2020 All-Ireland Under-20 Hurling Championship, the 57th season of the All-Ireland Under-20 Hurling Championship, a tournament organised by the Gaelic Athletic Association for the champion teams of Leinster and Munster. The final was contested by Cork of Munster and Dublin of Leinster, with Cork winning by 2–19 to 1–18.

The All-Ireland final between Cork and Dublin was the first ever championship meeting between the two teams. Cork were hoping to claim a record 12th All-Ireland title and a first title since 1998, while Dublin were hoping to claim their first ever title.

Cork had a better start than Dublin, with Pádraig Power, Alan Connolly and Shane Barrett hitting points in the opening minute and a half. After Daire Connery put them four in front, a run by Connolly set up Power, whose shot was saved by goalkeeper Gibbons only for Seán Twomey to score on the rebound. Murphy eventually got Dublin on the scoreboard but Cork still led by 1–06 to 0–02 at the water-break and it was 1–11 to 0–07 at the interval.

Dublin began the second half well, with Micheál Murphy sending over two points. By the third quarter Dublin had reduced the deficit to four points when[Darragh Power pointed on 47 minutes. Cork immediately replied with a point from Alan Connolly and then a goal from Pádraig Power, set up by Brian Roche. That made it 2–16 to 0–14 and substitute Brian Hayes followed that up with two points to put Cork ten ahead.

Dublin responded when Liam Murphy scored his fifth point, goalkeeper Eddie Gibbons landed a long-range free and then Dara Purcell had his fourth to make it 2–18 to 0–17. Then, when Dublin won a 20m free, Gibbons' shot was stopped on the Cork line but substitute Luke McDwyer scored on the rebound and four points was the difference again as the game entered injury time. Jack Cahalane had a Cork point which was quickly nullified by Murphy, however, Cork secured the title with a 2–19 to 1–18 win.

Cork's All-Ireland victory was their first in 22 years. The win gave them their 12th All-Ireland title overall and put them in first position on the all-time roll of honour.

== Match ==
=== Details ===
10 July 2021
19:15

Cork	2–19 – 1–18	Dublin
P Power 1–1, S Twomey 1–0, S Barrett 0–3, D Connery 0–3 (2f), A Connolly 0–3 (2f), D Flynn 0–2, T O’Connell 0–2, C O’Brien 0–2 (1 sideline), B Hayes 0–2, J Cahalane 0–1.	Report	L Murphy 0–6 (3f), D Purcell 0–4, L McDwyer 1–0, M Murphy 0–3, K Desmond 0–2, E Gibbons 0–2 (2f), D Power 0–1.

UPMC Nowlan Park
Referee: J Keenan (Wicklow)
