= Conor O'Callaghan =

Conor O'Callaghan may refer to:

- Conor O'Callaghan (poet) (born 1968), Irish novelist and poet
- Conor O'Callaghan (hurler) (born 2000), Irish hurler
- Conor O'Callaghan, candidate in the 2024 United States House of Representatives elections in Arizona
