= Ross Banville =

Irish hurler

Personal information
- Native name: Ross Ó Bánmhaoil (Irish)
- Born: 2001 (age 24–25) Wexford, Ireland
- Occupation: Teacher in Dublin

Sport
- Sport: Hurling
- Position: Left corner-forward
Club
- Years: Club
- 2018-present: Shelmaliers
Club titles
	Football	Hurling
Wexford titles	2	1
College
- Years: College
- DCU Dóchas Éireann
College titles
- Fitzgibbon titles: 0
Inter-county*
Years	County	Apps (scores)
2021-present	Wexford	0 (0-00)
Inter-county titles
- Leinster titles: 0
- All-Irelands: 0
- NHL: 0
- All Stars: 0
- *Inter County team apps and scores correct as of 20:05, 13 February 2022.

Ross Banville (born 2000) is an Irish hurler. At club level he plays with Shelmaliers, while he is also a member of the Wexford senior hurling team. He usually lines out as a forward.

== Career ==
Banville first played hurling and Gaelic football at juvenile and underage levels with the Shelmaliers club. He was just 18-years-old when he progressed to adult level as a dual player and won a Wexford SFC in 2018. Banville was the championship's top scorer when Shelmaliers won the Wexford SHC title in 2020. He collected a second Wexford SFC medal in 2021. Banville has also lined out for DCU Dóchas Éireann in the Fitzgibbon Cup.

Banville first appeared on the inter-county scene at minor level with Wexford. He was the team's top scorer during the Leinster MHC in 2017. He later spent two seasons with the under-20 team. Banville joined the Wexford senior hurling team in 2021.

== Career statistics ==
As of 12 February 2023.

Team	Year	National League			Leinster		All-Ireland		Total	
Team	Year	Division	Apps	Score	Apps	Score	Apps	Score	Apps	Score
Wexford (MH)	2017	—			3	0-28	—		3	0-28
Wexford (MH)	Total	—			3	0-28	—		3	0-28
Wexford (U20)	2019	—			3	0-25	—		3	0-25
Wexford (U20)	2020	—			1	0-06	—		1	0-06
Wexford (U20)	Total	—			4	0-31	—		4	0-31
Wexford	2021	Division 1B	0	0-00	0	0-00	0	0-00	0	0-00
Wexford	2022	Division 1A	0	0-00	0	0-00	0	0-00	0	0-00
Wexford	2023	Division 1A	1	1-03	0	0-00	0	0-00	1	1-03
Wexford	Total		1	1-03	0	0-00	0	0-00	1	1-03
Career total			1	1-03	7	0-59	0	0-00	8	1-62

== Honours ==
Shelmaliers

- Wexford Senior Hurling Championship: 2020
- Wexford Senior Football Championship: 2018, 2021
