= Eddie Gibbons =

Irish hurler

Personal information
- Native name: Éamonn Mac Giobúin (Irish)
- Born: 2000 (age 25–26) Stillorgan, Dublin, Ireland
- Occupation: Sales executive

Sport
- Sport: Hurling
- Position: Goalkeeper
Club
- Years: Club
- Kilmacud Crokes
Club titles
- Dublin titles: 2
College
- Years: College
- 2018-2023: DCU Dóchas Éireann
College titles
- Fitzgibbon titles: 0
Inter-county
- Years: County
- 2023-present: Dublin
Inter-county titles
- Leinster titles: 0
- All-Irelands: 0
- NHL: 0
- All Stars: 0

Eddie Gibbons (born 2000) is an Irish hurler. At club level he plays with Kilmacud Crokes and at inter-county level with the Dublin senior hurling team. Gibbons usually lines out as a goalkeeper.

== Career ==
Gibbons began his club career as a forward at juvenile and underage levels with the Kilmacud Crokes club in Stillorgan. He was part of the club's minor team that beat Ballyboden St Enda's to win the Dublin MAHC in 2018. Gibbons progressed to adult level as a goalkeeper and won consecutive Dublin SHC medals in 2021 and 2022. He also lined out with DCU Dóchas Éireann in the Fitzgibbon Cup.

Gibbons began his inter-county career with Dublin as a member of the under-17 team that lost the 2017 All-Ireland under-17 final to Cork. He progressed to under-20 level, but again lost out to Cork in the 2020 All-Ireland under-20 final. Gibbons made his senior team debut in a defeat of Westmeath in the 2023 Walsh Cup.

== Honours ==
Kilmacud Crokes

- Dublin Senior Hurling Championship: 2021, 2022
- Dublin Minor A Hurling Championship: 2021, 2022

Dublin

- Leinster Under-20 Hurling Championship: 2020
- Leinster Under-17 Hurling Championship: 2017
