= Liam Murphy (hurler) =

Irish hurler

Personal information
- Native name: Liam Ó Murchú (Irish)
- Born: 2000 (age 25–26) Dalkey, County Dublin, Ireland
- Occupation: Student

Sport
- Sport: Hurling
- Position: Left corner-forward
Club
- Years: Club
- 2018-present: Cuala
Club titles
- Dublin titles: 2
College
- Years: College
- University College Dublin
College titles
- Fitzgibbon titles: 0
Inter-county
- Years: County
- 2023-present: Dublin
Inter-county titles
- Leinster titles: 0
- All-Irelands: 0
- NHL: 0
- All Stars: 0

Liam Murphy (born 2000) is an Irish hurler. At club level he plays with Cuala and at inter-county level with the Dublin senior hurling team. Murphy usually lines out as a forward.

== Career ==
Murphy began his club career at juvenile and underage levels with the Cuala club in Dalkey. He also lined out with the Dublin South amalgamation in the Leinster Colleges SHC. Murphy progressed to adult club level and won consecutive Dublin SHC medals in 2019 and 2020. He also lined out with University College Dublin in the Fitzgibbon Cup.

Murphy began his inter-county career with Dublin as a member of the under-17 team that lost the 2017 All-Ireland under-17 final to Cork. He progressed to under-20 level, but again lost out to Cork in the 2020 All-Ireland under-20 final. Murphy made his senior team debut in a defeat of Westmeath in the 2023 Walsh Cup.

== Honours ==
Cuala

- Dublin Senior Hurling Championship: 2019, 2020

Dublin

- Leinster Under-20 Hurling Championship: 2020
- Leinster Under-17 Hurling Championship: 2017
