= Barry Walsh =

Irish hurler

Personal information
- Native name: Barra Breathnach (Irish)
- Born: 2006 (age 19–20) Killeagh, County Cork, Ireland
- Occupation: Student

Sport
- Sport: Hurling
- Position: Right corner-forward
Club
Years	Club	Apps (scores)
2025-present	Killeagh	4 (4-20)
Club titles
- Cork titles: 0
College
- Years: College
- 2025-present: MTU Cork
College titles
- Fitzgibbon titles: 0
Inter-county*
Years	County	Apps (scores)
2026-	Cork	6 (0-07)
Inter-county titles
- Munster titles: 0
- All-Irelands: 0
- NHL: 0
- All Stars: 0
- *Inter County team apps and scores correct as of 21:03, 5 July 2026.

Barry Walsh (born 2006) is an Irish hurler. At club level, he plays with Killeagh and at inter-county level with the Cork senior hurling team.

== Career ==
Walsh played hurling at all grades, including the Dr Harty Cup, during his time as a student at Midleton CBS Secondary School. He later lined out with MTU Cork's freshers' hurling team.

At club level, Walsh first played for Killeagh at juvenile and underage levels. He was part of the club's minor team that won consecutive Cork Premier 2 MHC titles in 2022 and 2023, after respective defeats of Erin's Own and Shandrum. Walsh made his Killeagh senior team debut in June 2025.

At inter-county level, Walsh was part of Cork hurling development squads since under-14 level. He was part of the minor team that lost the 2023 Munster MHC final to Clare, but ended the year by being included on the GAA Minor Hurling Team of the Year. Walsh immediately progressed to the under-20 team.

Walsh was added to the senior team in 2026 and was included on the starting fifteen for Cork's National Hurling League game against Kilkenny.

== Career statistics ==
=== Club ===
As of 1 August 2026

Team	Year	Cork SAHC	
Team	Year	Apps	Score
Killeagh	2025	3	3-16
Killeagh	2026	1	1-04
Career total		4	4-20

=== Inter-county ===
==== Minor and under-20 ====
As of 6 May 2026

Team	Year	Munster		All-Ireland		Total	
Team	Year	Apps	Score	Apps	Score	Apps	Score
Cork (MH)	2023	4	3-27	1	0-05	5	3-32
Cork (MH)	Total	4	3-27	1	0-05	5	3-32
Cork (U20)	Year	Munster		All-Ireland		Total	
Cork (U20)	Year	Apps	Score	Apps	Score	Apps	Score
Cork (U20)	2024	6	1-04	—		6	1-04
Cork (U20)	2025	5	2-43	—		5	2-43
Cork (U20)	2026	4	3-30	—		4	3-30
Cork (U20)	Total	15	6-77	—		15	6-77

==== Senior ====
As of 4 July 2026

Team	Year	National League			Munster		All-Ireland		Total	
Team	Year	Division	Apps	Score	Apps	Score	Apps	Score	Apps	Score
Cork	2026	Division 1A	3	2-01	4	0-06	2	0-01	9	2-08
Career total			3	2-01	4	0-06	2	0-01	9	2-08

== Honours ==
Killeagh

- Cork Premier 2 Minor Hurling Championship: 2022, 2023
