= 2025 Cork Senior A Hurling Championship =

Annual hurling competition season

- Dates: 2 August - 1 November 2025
- Teams: 12
- Sponsor: Co-Op Superstores
- Champions: Bride Rovers (1st title); Conleith Ryan (captain); Brian Murphy (manager)
- Runners-up: Castlelyons; Colm Spillane (captain); Michael Spillane (manager)
- Relegated: Bishopstown

Tournament statistics
- Matches played: 25
- Goals scored: 76 (3.04 per match)
- Points scored: 841 (33.64 per match)
- Top scorer(s): Adam Walsh (2-42)

The 2025 Cork Senior A Hurling Championship was the sixth staging of the Cork Senior A Hurling Championship since its establishment by the Cork County Board in 2020. The draw for the group stage placings took place on 10 December 2024. The championship ran from 2 August to 1 November 2025.

The final, a replay, was played on 1 November 2025 at SuperValu Páirc Uí Chaoimh in Cork, between Bride Rovers and Castlelyons, in what was their first ever meeting in the final. Bride Rovers won the match by 2–15 to 2–14 to claim their first ever championship title in the grade.

Adam Walsh was the championship's top scorer with 2-42.

== Team changes ==
=== To Championship ===
Relegated from the Cork Premier Senior Hurling Championship

- Bishopstown

Promoted from the Cork Premier Intermediate Hurling Championship

- Watergrasshill

=== From Championship ===
Promoted to the Cork Premier Senior Hurling Championship

- Glen Rovers

Relegated to the Cork Premier Intermediate Hurling Championship

- Cloyne

== Group A ==
=== Group A table ===
Semi-finalist Quarter-finalist

| Team | Matches | | | | Score | | | Pts |
| Team | Pld | W | D | L | For | Against | Diff | Pts |
|---|---|---|---|---|---|---|---|---|
| Carrigtwohill | 3 | 3 | 0 | 0 | 83 | 54 | 29 | 6 |
| Na Piarsaigh | 3 | 1 | 0 | 2 | 70 | 74 | -4 | 2 |
| Fermoy | 3 | 1 | 0 | 2 | 53 | 60 | -7 | 2 |
| Killeagh | 3 | 1 | 0 | 2 | 63 | 81 | -18 | 2 |

=== Group A results ===
| 2 August 2025 Round 1 | Carrigtwohill | 4-14 - 0-17 | Fermoy | Páirc Bhríde |
| | J Mulcahy 2-2, C O’Riordan 1-1, P Walsh 0-4, S Walsh 0-3 (0-2 f), P O’Sullivan 1-0, M Barrett 0-2, S de Búrca, L Gosnell 0-1 each. | Report | J Carr 0-7 (0-6 f, 0-1 65), D Daly 0-3, J Molloy 0-2, D Lardner (f), D O’Callaghan, K Morrison, A Aherne, G Lardner 0-1 each. |

| 3 August 2025 Round 1 | Killeagh | 2-26 - 2-24 | Na Piarsaigh | Clonmult Memorial Park |
| | Barry Walsh 1-8 (0-8 f), R McCarthy 1-3, S Smiddy, S Long 0-4 each, E Lane 0-3, D McCarthy, Ben Walsh, R Long, C Fitzgibbon 0-1 each. | Report | D Connery 1-8 (1-0 pen, 0-3 f), R O’Sullivan 0-5 (0-1 f), P Guest 1-1, C Hanafin 0-3, K Moynihan, C Hogan 0-2 each, P Murphy, C Meaney, L Sheehan 0-1 each. |

| 15 August 2025 Round 2 | Fermoy | 1-16 - 3-05 | Killeagh | St Catherine's Park |
| | B O’Sullivan 0-9 (0-8 f), D Daly 1-0, S Aherne 0-2, S Coughlan (f), P de Róiste, K Morrison, D Lardner (f), J Carr 0-1 each. | Report | Barry Walsh 2-4 (1-3 f, 0-1 65), E Lane 1-0, G Leahy 0-1. |

| 17 August 2025 Round 2 | Na Piarsaigh | 2-14 - 1-22 | Carrigtwohill | Páirc Uí Rinn |
| | D Connery 1-6 (0-4 f, 0-1 65), R O’Sullivan 0-4 f, L Donovan 1-0, C Hanifin, O Galvin, Evan Sheehan (f), P Guest 0-1 each. | Report | S Walsh 0-9 (0-3 f), J Mulcahy 1-4, M Barrett (0-2 f), P Walsh 0-4 each, J Oke 0-1. |

| 6 September 2025 Round 3 | Killeagh | 1-14 - 4-20 | Carrigtwohill | Aghavine Grounds |
| | Barry Walsh 0-4 (0-2 f, 0-1 65), E Lane 1-1, D McCarthy 0-3 (0-1 65), G Leahy 0-2, Ben Walsh, C Fitzgibbon, R McCarthy, D Buckley 0-1 each. | Report | S Walsh 2-7 (0-3 f), P Walsh 2-3, L Gosnell 0-4, J Oke 0-2, M Barrett, C O’Riordan, J Mulcahy, L O’Sullivan 0-1 each. |

| 6 September 2025 Round 3 | Na Piarsaigh | 2-14 - 0-17 | Fermoy | Páirc LiosgCúl |
| | R O’Sullivan 1-6 (0-6 f), P Guest 1-4 (0-2 f), C Hanafin 0-2, DJ Coffey, O Galvin 0-1 each. | Report | B O’Sullivan 0-10 (0-8 f), A Aherne, K Morrison 0-2 each, D Lardner, S Coughlan (f), J O’Brien 0-1 each. |

== Group B ==
=== Group B table ===
Semi-finalist Quarter-finalist Relegation playoff

| Team | Matches | | | | Score | | | Pts |
| Team | Pld | W | D | L | For | Against | Diff | Pts |
|---|---|---|---|---|---|---|---|---|
| Castlelyons | 3 | 3 | 0 | 0 | 76 | 58 | 18 | 6 |
| Inniscarra | 3 | 2 | 0 | 1 | 69 | 62 | 7 | 4 |
| Ballyhea | 3 | 1 | 0 | 2 | 64 | 69 | -5 | 2 |
| Bishopstown | 3 | 0 | 0 | 3 | 45 | 65 | -20 | 0 |

=== Group B results ===
| 2 August 2025 Round 1 | Ballyhea | 1-19 - 2-23 | Inniscarra | Mourneabbey Grounds |
| | J Morrissey 0-12 (0-10 f), Tom Hanley 1-1, P O’Callaghan 0-4, J Copps, M O’Sullivan 0-1 each. | Report | J Enright 0-9 (0-6 f, 0-2 65), B Daly 1-1, F Horgan 1-0, C Lynch, D Murphy 0-3 each, P Holland (f), A McCarthy, S O’Donoghue 0-2 each, M Nagle 0-1. |

| 2 August 2025 Round 1 | Bishopstown | 0-17 - 0-24 | Castlelyons | Blarney Grounds |
| | J Scally 0-6 (0-5f), B Murray 0-4, C Hegarty 0-3, D Quaid, R Foley, H Grant, C Murray (0-1 each). | Report | A Fenton 0-9 (0-7f), A Spillane 0-4, D Morrison 0-3, D Tobin 0-2, K O’Leary 0-2, S Cotter, A O’Sullivan, J Kearney, C McCarthy (0-1 each). |

| 16 August 2025 Round 2 | Castlelyons | 4-16 - 1-16 | Ballyhea | Kildorrery Grounds |
| | A Spillane 4-4, A Fenton 0-4 (0-3 f, 0-1 65), L Doocey 0-3, J Kearney 0-2, D Tobin, J Barry, R Fenton 0-1 each. | Report | J Morrissey 0-7 (0-5 f, 0-1 65), P O’Callaghan 0-6 (0-4 f, 0-2 sl), E O'Leary 1-0, D Copps, M O’Sullivan, C Crowley 0-1 each. |

| 16 August 2025 Round 2 | Inniscarra | 2-12 - 1-13 | Bishopstown | Ballymah Grounds |
| | P Holland 2-2 (0-1 f), J Enright 0-5 f, C Lynch 0-2, F Horgan, B Daly, N Buckley 0-1 each. | Report | J Scally 0-8 f, R Foley 1-0, C Murray, C Hegarty, C O'Hora, B Murray, D Daly 0-1 each. |

| 6 September 2025 Round 3 | Bishopstown | 1-09 - 3-14 | Ballyhea | Fr Con Buckley Park |
| | J Scally 0-7 (0-6 f), B Murray 1-0, T Murray 0-2. | Report | E O’Leary 2-4, P O’Callaghan 0-5 (0-4 f), K Morrissey 1-1, M Browne (f), J Morrissey (65), L Crowley, T Hanley 0-1 each. |

| 6 September 2025 Round 3 | Castlelyons | 2-18 - 1-19 | Inniscarra | Páirc Uí Rinn |
| | A Fenton 1-6 (1-4f); K O’Leary 0-6; D Morrison 1-0; D Tobin, N O’Leary 0-2 each; A Spillane, S Moroney 0-1 each. | Report | P Holland 1-4f; J Enright 0-6 (0-4f); N Buckley, D Murphy 0-2 each; F Horgan, D Murphy, S Sheehan, S O’Donoghue, A McCarthy 0-1 each. |

== Group C ==
=== Group C table ===
Quarter-finalist Relegation playoff

| Team | Matches | | | | Score | | | Pts |
| Team | Pld | W | D | L | For | Against | Diff | Pts |
|---|---|---|---|---|---|---|---|---|
| Blarney | 3 | 2 | 0 | 1 | 77 | 44 | 33 | 4 |
| Bride Rovers | 3 | 2 | 0 | 1 | 75 | 67 | 8 | 4 |
| Watergrasshill | 3 | 2 | 0 | 1 | 64 | 74 | -10 | 4 |
| Courcey Rovers | 3 | 0 | 0 | 3 | 56 | 87 | -31 | 0 |

=== Group C results ===
| 3 August 2025 Round 1 | Courcey Rovers | 1-22 - 3-18 | Watergrasshill | Páirc Uí Rinn |
| | R Sweetnam 0-9 (0-7 f), A O’Donovan 1-2 (1-0 sl), T O’Sullivan 0-4, D O’Donovan 0-3, DJ Twomey 0-2, C Crowley 0-1. | Report | S Desmond 2-3, K O’Neill 0-8 (0-6 f), A Murphy 1-0, J Gowen, K O’Neill, A Cronin, P Cronin, L Foley, R Loftus, C O’Leary 0-1 each. |

| 3 August 2025 Round 1 | Blarney | 1-15 - 1-22 | Bride Rovers | Páirc Uí Rinn |
| | M Coleman 1-7 (0-5 f), C McCarthy 0-3, A McEvoy 0-2, E Kirby, D McSweeney, J Murphy 0-1 each. | Report | A Walsh 0-8 (0-4 f), B Roche 0-7, C Ryan 1-0, C Barry, S O’Connor 0-2 each, D Barry, L Roche, C Hogan (0-1 f) 0-1 each. |

| 15 August 2025 Round 2 | Bride Rovers | 4-22 - 2-18 | Courcey Rovers | Riverstown Sportsfield |
| | A Walsh 0-8 (0-5 f), B Roche 2-1, C Ryan 2-1, C O’Sullivan 0-5, S O’Connor 0-3, L Roche C Barry, J Mannix, L Roche 0-1 each. | Report | R Sweetman 0-9 (0-8 f), D O’Donovan 2-2, A O’Donovan 0-3, R O’Callaghan 0-3, B Ryan 0-1. |

| 16 August 2025 Round 2 | Watergrasshill | 0-12 - 3-24 | Blarney | Grenagh Grounds |
| | A Murphy 0-9 (0-6 f), S Desmond, A Foley, S O’Regan (65) 0-1 each. | Report | M Coleman 0-9 (0-4 f, 0-2 65), C McCarthy 2-3, C Barrett 1-0, S Barrett 0-3 f, D McSweeney 0-3, J Murphy, E Kirby 0-2 each, C Power, A McEvoy 0-1 each. |

| 6 September 2025 Round 3 | Blarney | 3-17 - 0-07 | Courcey Rovers | Páirc Naomh Eoin |
| | M Coleman 1-5 (0-5 f, 1-0 pen), E Kirby 0-5, C McCarthy, D McSweeney 1-2 each, S Barrett 0-2, S Mulcahy 0-1. | Report | R Sweetnam 0-6 (0-5 f), J McCarthy 0-1. |

| 6 September 2025 Round 3 | Bride Rovers | 1-13 - 1-22 | Watergrasshill | St Catherine's Park |
| | A Walsh 0-5 (0-4 f), C Ryan 1-0, B Roche, R O’Connell 0-2 each, C hogan, C Tobin, L Roche, J Mannix 0-1 each. | Report | A Murphy 0-13 (0-6 f, 0-1 65), B Lehane 1-2, K O’Neill 0-2, S Desmond, C O’Leary, D Roche, P O’Leary, L Foley 0-1 each. |

== Relegation stage ==
=== Relegation playoff ===
| 21 September 2025 Playoff | Bishopstown | 0-14 - 0-16 | Courcey Rovers | Charlie Hurley Park |
| | J Scally 0-5 f, C Murray 0-3, D O’Donovan 0-2, D Quaid, C Hegarty, K McFadden, B Murray 0-1 each. | Report | R Sweetnam 0-6 f, T O’Sullivan 0-3, O Crowley 0-2, R O’Callaghan, DJ Twomey, D O’Donovan, J McCarthy, C Crowley 0-1 each. |

== Knockout stage ==
=== Bracket ===
Quarter-Finals
Bride Rovers (Imokilly) | 2–23
Inniscarra (Muskerry) | 1–18
Blarney (Muskerry) | 1–21
Na Piarsaigh (Seandún) | 0–19

Semi-Finals
Carrigtwohill (Imokilly) | 1–14
Bride Rovers (Imokilly) | 3–14
Castlelyons (Imokilly) | 4–12
Blarney (Muskerry) | 0–19

Final
Bride Rovers (Imokilly) | 0–14, 2–15
Castlelyons (Imokilly) | 0–14, 2–14

=== Quarter-finals ===
| 20 September 2025 Quarter-final | Bride Rovers | 2-23 - 1-18 | Inniscarra | Páirc Uí Rinn |
| | A Walsh (1-9, 0-8 frees); B Roche (1-2); D Barry (0-3); C Ryan, K Kearney, R O’Connell (0-2 each); C Hogan (free), C Barry, L Roche (0-1 each). | Report | J Enright (0-7, 0-5 frees); P Holland (0-5, 0-2 frees); F Horgan (1-0); S O’Donoghue (0-2, 0-1 free); N Buckley, D Murphy, D O’Brien, C Lynch (0-1 each). |

| 20 September 2025 Quarter-final | Blarney | 1-21 - 0-19 | Na Piarsaigh | Páirc Uí Rinn |
| | C Barrett 1-4, M Coleman 0-5 f, S Mulcahy, S Barrett 0-3 each, C McCarthy, E Kirby 0-2 each, C Hegarty, D McSweeney 0-1 each. | Report | P Guest 0-6 (0-3 f, 0-1 65), R O’Sullivan 0-3 (0-1 f), K Moynihan, P Rourke, E Sheehan 0-2 each, O Galvin, L Sheehan, DJ Coffey, C Hanafin 0-1 each. |

=== Semi-finals ===
| 4 October 2025 Semi-final | Carrigtwohill | 1-14 - 3-14 | Bride Rovers | SuperValu Páirc Uí Chaoimh |
| | S Walsh 1-6 (0-4 f, 1-0 pen, 0-1 65), M Barrett 0-3 (0-2 f), L Gosnell 0-2, P Walsh, L O’Sullivan, C O’Riordan 0-1 each. | Report | B Roche 1-3, P O’Flynn 0-3, C Ryan, R O’Connell 1-0 each, A Walsh (2 fs), C Tobin, D Barry 0-2 each, K Kearney, J Ahern 0-1 each. |

| 4 October 2025 Semi-final | Castlelyons | 4-12 - 0-19 | Blarney | SuperValu Páirc Uí Chaoimh |
| | A Fenton 1-8 (0-7 f), D Morrison 3-1, A Spillane 0-2, L Doocey 0-1. | Report | M Coleman 0-11 (0-9 f, 0-1 64), S Barrett 0-4 (0-2 f), C Barrett, D McSweeney, J Murphy, S Mulcahy 0-1 each. |

=== Final ===
| 25 October 2025 Final | Bride Rovers | 0-14 - 0-14 | Castlelyons | SuperValu Páirc Uí Chaoimh |
| | P O’Flynn (0-4, 0-4 frees); A Walsh (0-3 frees), S O’Connor (0-3 each); B Roche (0-2); E Roche, C Ryan (0-1 each). | Report | A Fenton (0-8, 0-7 frees); J Kearney (0-2); C Spillane, K O’Leary, A Spillane, D Morrison (0-1 each). |

=== Final replay ===
| 1 November 2025 Final | Bride Rovers | 2-15 - 2-14 | Castlelyons | SuperValu Páirc Uí Chaoimh |
| | A Walsh 1-7 (0-6 f), P O’Flynn 1-1, D Barry 0-2, J Peters, C Tobin, S O’Connor, B Roche, C O’Sullivan 0-1 each. | Report | L Doocey 1-1, D Morrison 1-0, A Fenton 0-3 (0-2 f), E Maye, A Spillane, K O’Leary 0-2 each, C Spillane, N O’Leary, S Moroney, J Kearney 0-1 each. | Referee: M Maher (St Finbarr’s) |

== Championship statistics ==
=== Top scorers ===
Overall

| Rank | Player | Club | Tally | Total | Matches | Average |
|---|---|---|---|---|---|---|
| 1 | Adam Walsh | Bride Rovers | 2-42 | 48 | 7 | 6.85 |
| 2 | Alan Fenton | Castlelyons | 2-38 | 44 | 6 | 7.33 |
| 3 | Mark Coleman | Blarney | 2-37 | 43 | 5 | 8.60 |
| 4 | Seán Walsh | Carrigtwohill | 3-25 | 34 | 4 | 8.50 |
| 5 | Brian Roche | Bride Rovers | 4-18 | 30 | 7 | 4.28 |
| 5 | Richard Sweetnam | Courcey Rovers | 0-30 | 30 | 4 | 7.50 |
| 7 | Joseph Enright | Inniscarra | 0-27 | 27 | 4 | 6.75 |
| 8 | James Scally | Bishopstown | 0-26 | 26 | 4 | 6.50 |
| 9 | Barry Walsh | Killeagh | 3-16 | 25 | 3 | 8.33 |
| 9 | Adam Murphy | Watergrasshill | 1-22 | 25 | 3 | 8.33 |

Single game

| Rank | Player | Club | Tally | Total | Opposition |
|---|---|---|---|---|---|
| 1 | Anthony Spillane | Castlelyons | 4-04 | 16 | Ballyhea |
| 2 | Seán Walsh | Carrigtwohill | 2-07 | 13 | Killeagh |
| 2 | Adam Murphy | Watergrasshill | 0-13 | 13 | Bride Rovers |
| 4 | Adam Walsh | Bride Rovers | 1-09 | 12 | Inniscarra |
| 4 | John Morrissey | Ballyhea | 0-12 | 12 | Inniscarra |
| 6 | Alan Fenton | Castlelyons | 1-08 | 8 | Blarney |
| 6 | Barry Walsh | Killeagh | 1-08 | 11 | Na Piarsaigh |
| 6 | Daire Connery | Na Piarsaigh | 1-08 | 11 | Killeagh |
| 6 | Mark Coleman | Blarney | 0-11 | 11 | Castlelyons |
| 10 | David Morrison | Castlelyons | 3-01 | 10 | Blarney |
| 10 | Eugene O'Leary | Ballyhea | 2-04 | 10 | Bishopstown |
| 10 | Barry Walsh | Killeagh | 2-04 | 10 | Fermoy |
| 10 | Adam Walsh | Bride Rovers | 1-07 | 10 | Castlelyons |
| 10 | Mark Coleman | Blarney | 1-07 | 10 | Bride Rovers |
| 10 | Brian O'Sullivan | Fermoy | 0-10 | 10 | Na Piarsaigh |
