= Craig Morgan (hurler) =

Irish hurler

Sport
- Sport: Hurling
- Position: Corner-back
Club
- Years: Club
- Kilruane MacDonagh's
Club titles
- Tipperary titles: 1
Inter-county*
Years	County	Apps (scores)
2020–	Tipperary	19 (0-03)
Inter-county titles
- Munster titles: 0
- All-Irelands: 1
- NHL: 0
- All Stars: 0
- *Inter County team apps and scores correct as of 28 September 2026.

Craig Morgan is an Irish hurler who plays for Tipperary Senior Championship club Kilruane MacDonagh's and at inter-county level with the Tipperary county hurling team.

== Career ==
Morgan made his senior debut for Tipperary on 25 January 2020 when he came on as a substitute in the opening round of the 2020 National Hurling League against Limerick in a 0–18 to 2–14 defeat. He made his championship debut on 17 April 2022, starting against Waterford in the opening round of the 2022 Munster Hurling Championship.

On 20 July in the 2025 All-Ireland final, Morgan started in the half-back line as Tipperary defeated Cork by 3–27 to 1-19 and claim a 29th All-Ireland title.

== Career statistics ==
(Championship only) As of match played 24 May 2026

Team	Year	National League			Munster		All-Ireland		Total	
Team	Year	Division	Apps	Score	Apps	Score	Apps	Score	Apps	Score
Tipperary	2021	Division 1			—		—			
Tipperary	2022	Division 1			4	0-00	—		4	0-00
Tipperary	2023	Division 1			—		1	0-00	1	0-00
Tipperary	2024	Division 1			4	0-00	—		4	0-00
Tipperary	2025	Division 1			4	0-03	4	0-00	8	0-03
Tipperary	2026	Division 1			3	0-00			3	0-00
Career total					15	0-03	5	0-00	20	0-03

== Honours ==
- All-Ireland Senior Hurling Championship (1): 2025
- All-Ireland Under-21 Hurling Championship (2): 2018, 2019 (c)
- Munster Under-20 Hurling Championship (1): 2019 (c)
