= 2021 Cork Premier Intermediate Hurling Championship =

- Dates: 11 September - 27 November 2021
- Teams: 12
- Sponsor: Co-Op Superstores
- Champions: Courcey Rovers (2nd title); Tadhg O'Sullivan (captain); Seán Guiheen (manager)
- Runners-up: Castlelyons; Anthony Spillane (captain); Ciarán McGann (manager)

Tournament statistics
- Matches played: 23
- Goals scored: 56 (2.43 per match)
- Points scored: 737 (32.04 per match)
- Top scorer(s): Richard Sweetnam (0-46)

The 2021 Cork Premier Intermediate Hurling Championship was the 18th staging of the Cork Premier Intermediate Hurling Championship since its establishment by the Cork County Board in 2004. The draw for the group stage placings took place on 29 April 2021. The championship began on 11 September 2021 and ended on 27 November 2021.

The final was played on 27 November 2021 at Páirc Uí Chaoimh in Cork, between Courcey Rovers and Castlelyons, in what was their first ever meeting in a final. Courcey Rovers won the match by 1–19 to 1–18 to claim their second championship title overall and a first title since 2011.

Richard Sweetnam was the championship's top scorer with 0-46.

== Team changes ==
=== To Championship ===
Relegated from the Cork Senior A Hurling Championship

- Kilworth

Promoted from the Cork Intermediate A Hurling Championship

- Éire Óg

=== From Championship ===
Promoted to the Cork Senior A Hurling Championship

- Blarney

Relegated to the Cork Intermediate A Hurling Championship

- Blackrock

== Participating teams ==
The seedings were based on final group stage positions from the 2020 championship.

Top seeds Second seeds Third seeds Fourth seeds

Team	Location	Colours	Seeding
Kilworth	Kilworth	Red and white	1
Carrigaline	Carrigaline	Blue and yellow	2
Castlelyons	Castlelyons	Green and yellow	3
Watergrasshill	Watergrasshill	Red and white	4
Ballincollig	Ballincollig	Green and white	5
Courcey Rovers	Ballinspittle	Red and white	6
Ballinhassig	Ballinhassig	Blue and white	7
Youghal	Youghal	Maroon and yellow	8
Inniscarra	Inniscarra	Blue and white	9
Aghada	Aghada	Green and white	10
Valley Rovers	Innishannon	Green and white	11
Éire Óg	Ovens	Red and yellow	12

== Results ==
=== Group A ===
==== Table ====
Advance to knockout stage

Team	Matches				Score			Pts
Team	Pld	W	D	L	For	Against	Diff	Pts
Courcey Rovers	3	3	0	0	2-54	3-38	13	6
Carrigaline	3	2	0	1	2-51	4-40	5	4
Éire Óg	3	1	0	2	5-36	1-47	1	2
Youghal	3	0	0	3	4-32	5-48	-19	0

==== Fixtures and results ====
11 September 2021 Round 1	Carrigaline	0-19 - 1-20	Courcey Rovers	Ballinhassig GAA Grounds
	B Kelleher 0-13 (0-10 f), D Drake, P McBarron 0-2 each, R McCarthy, S O’Brien 0-1 each.	Report	R Sweetnam 0-12 (0-7 f, 0-1 65), S Twomey 1-1, S Nyhan 0-3 f, J McCarthy 0-2, A O’Donovan, J O’Neill 0-1 each.	Referee: A O'Connor (Ballygarvan)

12 September 2021 Round 1	Youghal	0-13 - 3-16	Éire Óg	Erin's Ownn GAA Grounds
	B Maloney 0-10 (10 frees), N Roche, J O’Mahony, R McMahon 0-1 each.	Report	K Hallissey 0-7 (7 frees), C O’Callaghan 2-0, D Kirwan 1-0, J Cooper, C Sheehan 0-3 each, John Cooper 0-2, R O’Toole 0-1.	Referee: I McCarthy (Bandon)

18 September 2021 Round 2	Éire Óg	0-12 - 1-16	Carrigaline	Páirc Liam Mhic Cárthaigh
	K Hallissey 0-4 f, Joe Cooper 0-3, D Goulding 0-2, D Kirwan, D Desmond (f), D Dineen 0-1 each.	Report	B Kelleher 0-9 (0-7 f), D Drake 1-0, D Griffin 0-3, R O’Shea 0-2, P McBarron, R Kelleher 0-1 each.	Referee: I McCarthy (Bandon)

18 September 2021 Round 2	Youghal	1-11 - 1-16	Courcey Rovers	Mayfield GAA Grounds
	B Moloney 0-7 f, O Hill 1-2, P Kirk, K Brown 0-1 each.	Report	R Sweetnam 0-10 (0-8 f, 0-1 65), S Twomey 1-2, O Crowley 0-3, J McCarthy 0-1.	Referee: S Stokes (Tullylease)

9 October 2021 Round 3	Carrigaline	1-16 - 3-08	Youghal	Killeagh GAA Grounds
	B Kelleher (0-7, 5f); D McCarthy (1-0); E Desmond, S O’Brien, F O’Connell (1f) (0-2 each); D Drake, R O’Shea, P McBarron (0-1 each).	Report	B Moloney (0-5, 4f), O Hill (1-2); N Roche, P Kirk (1-0 each); C O’Mahony (0-1).	Referee: D Copps (Ballyhea)

9 October 2021 Round 3	Courcey Rovers	0-18 - 2-08	Éire Óg	Cloughduv GAA Grounds
	R Sweetnam 0-9 f, T O’Sullivan 0-3, J O’Neill 0-2, S Nyhan, L Collins, O Crowley, D Coghlan 0-1 each.	Report	K Hallissey (0-4 f) 1-6, D Goulding 1-0, Joe Cooper, L Considine 0-1 each.

=== Group B ===
==== Table ====
Advance to knockout stage Advance to relegation play-off

Team	Matches				Score			Pts
Team	Pld	W	D	L	For	Against	Diff	Pts
Castlelyons	3	3	0	0	5-63	4-38	28	6
Valley Rovers	3	2	0	1	4-48	3-54	-3	4
Inniscarra	3	1	0	2	6-45	3-59	-5	2
Watergrasshill	3	0	0	3	4-44	9-49	-20	0

==== Fixtures and results ====
11 September 2021 Round 1	Castlelyons	3-21 - 1-11	Watergrasshill	Bride Rovers Park
	A Fenton (0-5 f) 0-8, J Kearney 1-4, A Spillane 1-2, D Morrison 1-1, M Spillane 0-3, E Maye 0-2, J Barry 0-1 free.	Report	S O’Regan (0-5 f) 1-11.	Referee: N O'Neill (Midleton)

11 September 2021 Round 1	Inniscarra	0-19 - 1-19	Valley Rovers	Ovens
	F O’Leary 0-5 f, K Rice, S O’Donoghue 0-4 each, M O’Connell 0-3, O McCarthy 0-2, C Casey 0-1,	Report	C O’Leary 0-11 (0-9 f), C Butler 0-5 (0-3 f), E O’Reilly 1-1, G Farrell, S O’Regan 0-1 each.	Referee: A Hyland (Kilworth)

18 September 2021 Round 2	Inniscarra	4-13 - 2-17	Watergrasshill	Grenagh GAA
	S O’Donoghue (0-2 f) 2-4, F O’Leary (0-3 f) 1-3, C Casey 1-0, S O’Mahony 0-4, J Harrington, O McCarthy 0-1 each.	Report	S Óg O’Regan (1-0 pen, 0-10 f) 2-10, S Desmond 0-3, C Roche, P O’Regan, A Cronin, C Cronin 0-1 each.	Referee: B Murphy (Carrigtwohill)

18 September 2021 Round 2	Valley Rovers	1-14 - 2-19	Castlelyons	Ballincollig GAA Grounds
	C O'Leary 1-8 (1-0 pen, 0-7 f), E O'Reilly 0-2, C Butler 0-2 f, S O'Regan 0-2 (0-1 f).	Report	J Kearney 1-3, A Spillane 0-5, A Fenton 0-5 (0-3 f), D Morrison 1-0, N O'Leary 0-3, K O'Leary 0-2, B Murphy 0-1.	Referee: B Barry-Murphy (Aghabullogue)

9 October 2021 Round 3	Castlelyons	0-23 - 2-13	Inniscarra	Riverstown Sportsfield
	A Fenton 0-11 (0-8 f, 0-2 65), D Morrison 0-4, A Spillane, N O'Leary 0-3 each, J Kenny, C McCarthy 0-1 each.	Report	J Enright 0-6 (0-4 f, 0-1 65), C Casey, L Ryan 1-0 each, F O'Leary 0-3, O McCarthy 0-2, S Sheehan, M O'Connell 0-1 each.	Referee: B Sweeney (Erin's Own)

9 October 2021 Round 3	Watergrasshill	1-16 - 2-15	Valley Rovers	Páirc Uí Rinn
	S Óg O’Regan 0-9 (0-8 f), S Desmond 1-1, P O’Regan 0-3 (0-2 f, 0-1 65), G Kelly Lynch 0-2, B Fenton 0-1.	Report	C O’Leary 0-9 (0-6 f, 0-1 65), E O’Reilly 1-2, C Desmond 1-1, A Kenneally, C Butler, W Hurley 0-1 each.	Referee: I McCarthy (Bandon)

=== Group C ===
==== Table ====
Advance to knockout stage Advance to relegation play-off

Team	Matches				Score			Pts
Team	Pld	W	D	L	For	Against	Diff	Pts
Kilworth	3	2	1	0	3-60	1-56	10	5
Ballinhassig	3	2	0	1	5-58	3-42	22	4
Ballincollig	3	1	1	1	3-54	4-46	5	3
Aghada	3	0	0	3	2-42	5-70	-37	0

==== Fixtures and results ====
12 September 2021 Round 1	Kilworth	1-20 - 0-23	Ballincollig	Watergrasshill
	N McNamara 0-9 (0-7), W Condon 1-2, J Sheehan 0-3, M Sheehan, L Whelan, B Tobin, J Saige, N Bryne, B Sheehan 0-1 each.	Report	S Wills 0-8 (0-6 f), S Walsh 0-4, C Dorgan 0-3, D Bowen 0-3 K Walsh, C Sexton, G Donoghue, R O’Donovan, P O’Neill 0-1 each.

12 September 2021 Round 1	Ballinhassig	3-24 - 0-17	Aghada	Mayfield
	C Desmond 1-7 (0-4 f), S O’Neill 1-3, F O’Leary 1-1, C Tyers 0-4, D O’Sullivan 0-2, J O’Sullivan, G Collins, J O’Callaghan, M Collins, E Cullinane, C Grainger, M Sheehan 0-1 each.	Report	W Leahy 0-15 (0-13 f), C Fleming, D Ryan 0-1 each.	Referee: C Egan (Glen Rovers)

18 September 2021 Round 2	Ballincollig	1-13 - 2-17	Ballinhassig	Brinny Sportsfield
	D Bowen 1-1, P Cooney 0-4 (0-3 f), R Bourke 0-2 (0-1 f), B Coleman, R O’Donovan, C O’Leary, C Dorgan, C O’Driscoll 0-1 each, S Wills 0-1 f.	Report	C Desmond 0-9 (0-5 f, 0-2 65), G Collins, S O’Neill 1-0 each, E Cullinane, D O’Sullivan 0-3 each, M Collins and C Grainger 0-1 each.	Referee: A O'Connor (Ballygarvan)

18 September 2021 Round 2	Aghada	1-16 - 0-28	Kilworth	Castlelyons GAA Grounds
	W Leahy 0-9 (0-6 f) Darragh Ryan 1-1, John Looney 0-3, Cian Fleming 0-1, Michael Russell 0-1, Mark McCarthy 0-1.	Report	N McNamara 0-11 (0-9 f), E Carey 0-5, L Whelan, W Condon 0-3 each, J Saich 0-2, K Walsh (f), M Sheehan, J McCarthy, B Sheehan 0-1 each.	Referee: B Sweeney (Erin's Own)

9 October 2021 Round 3	Kilworth	2-12 - 0-17	Ballinhassig	O'Connell Park
	N McNamara 0-7 f, W Condon, J Sheehan 1-1 each, E Carey, K Walsh (f), M Sheehan 0-1 each.	Report	C Desmond 0-10 (0-7 f, 0-1 65), G Collins 0-4, M Sheehan 0-2, S O'Neill 0-1.	Referee: P O'Driscoll (Bride Rovers)

9 October 2021 Round 3	Ballincollig	2-18 - 1-09	Aghada	Páirc Uí Chaoimh
	B Keating 0-10 (0-5 f), C Dorgan 2-1, C O’Driscoll, L Fahy 0-2 each, R O’Donovan, K Walsh, G O’Donoghue 0-1 each.	Report	M McCarthy 0-6 (0-5 f), D Ryan 1-0, C Fleming, J Looney, A Berry 0-1 each.	Referee: L O'Riordan (Belgooly)

=== Knockout stage ===
==== Relegation playoff ====
6 November 2021 Playoff	Watergrasshill	2-15 - 0-11	Aghada	Riverstown Sportsfield
	S Óg O’Regan (1-11 0-5 f, 0-1 sideline), S Desmond (1-1), J McCarthy, A Cronin and P O’Leary (0-1 each).	Report	M McCarthy (0-6 f), C Fleming (0-2, 0-1 f), D Ryan, A Berry and J O’Hanlon (0-1 each).	Referee: D Daly (Brian Dillons)

==== Quarter-finals ====
24 October 2021 Quarter-final	Kilworth	0-13 - 1-12	Valley Rovers	Blarney GAA Grounds
	N McNamara (0-4 f) 0-5, W Condon, L Whelan, E Carey 0-2 each, M Sheehan, B Tobin 0-1 each.	Report	C Butler (0-3 f) 0-5, M Savic 1-1, K Canty 0-4, A Kenneally, J Cottrell (f) 0-1 each.

30 October 2021 Quarter-final	Carrigaline	1-10 - 3-14	Ballinhassig	Tracton GAA Grounds
	B Kelleher 0-5 f, D McCarthy 1-0, D McBarron 0-3, E Desmond, R O’Shea 0-1 each.	Report	C Desmond 1-4 (0-2 f), E Cullinane 0-5 (0-1 sl), F O’Leary 1-1, G Collins 1-0, M Sheehan, C Tyers, D Donovan, B Lynch 0-1 each.	Referee: I McCarthy (Bandon)

==== Semi-finals ====
13 November 2021 Semi-final	Courcey Rovers	2-19 - 0-17	Valley Rovers	Páirc Uí Rinn
	S Nyhan (1-0 pen, 0-3 f), R Nyhan 1-3 each, R Sweetnam 0-4 (0-1 f), S Twomey 0-3, J O’Neill, T O’Sullivan 0-2 each, F Lordan, S McCarthy 0-1 each.	Report	C Butler 0-14 (0-12 f), D Murphy, A Kenneally, K Canty 0-1 each.	Referee: N O'Neill (Midleton)

20 November 2021 Semi-final	Castlelyons	1-17 - 1-16	Ballinhassig	Páirc Uí Rinn
	A Fenton 0-7 (0-6 f), J Barry 1-2 (1-0 pen, 0-2 f), A Spillane, N O’Leary 0-3 each, D Morrison, E Maye 0-1 each.	Report	C Desmond 0-6 f, C Reynolds 1-1, G Collins 0-3, E Finn, S O’Neill, E Cullinane 0-2 each.	Referee: I McCarthy (Bandon)

==== Final ====
27 November 2021 Final	Courcey Rovers	1-19 - 1-18	Castlelyons	Páirc Uí Chaoimh
	R Sweetnam 0-11 (0-9 f), J O’Neill 0-5, O Crowley 1-0, S Twomey 0-2, R Nyhan 0-1.	Report	A Fenton 0-7 (0-4 f), A Spillane, E Maye 0-3 each, N O’Leary 1-0, R Fenton, L Doocey, D Morrison, C Spillane, M Spillane 0-1 each.	Referee: D Daly (Brian Dillons)

== Championship statistics ==
=== Top scorers ===
Overall

Rank	Player	Club	Tally	Total	Matches	Average
1	Richard Sweetnam	Courcey Rovers	0-46	46	5	9.20
2	Conor Desmond	Ballinhassig	2-36	42	5	8.40
3	Shane Óg O'Regan	Watergrasshill	3-30	39	4	9.75
4	Alan Fenton	Castlelyons	0-38	38	5	7.40
5	Brian Kelleher	Carrigaline	0-34	34	4	8.50
6	Noel McNamara	Kilworth	0-32	32	4	8.00
7	Chris O'Leary	Valley Rovers	1-28	31	4	7.75
8	Colm Butler	Valley Rovers	0-27	27	5	5.40
9	Will Leahy	Aghada	0-24	24	2	12.00
10	Brett Maloney	Youghal	0-22	22	3	7.33

In a single game

Rank	Player	Club	Tally	Total	Opposition
1	Will Leahy	Aghada	0-15	15	Ballinhassig
2	Shane O'Regan	Watergrasshill	1-11	14	Castlelyons
2	Shane Óg O'Regan	Watergrasshill	1-11	14	Aghada
2	Colm Butler	Valley Rovers	0-14	14	Courcey Rovers
5	Brian Kelleher	Carrigaline	0-13	13	Courcey Rovers
6	Richard Sweetnam	Courcey Rovers	0-12	12	Carrigaline
7	Chris O'Leary	Valley Rovers	1-08	11	Castlelyons
7	Chris O'Leary	Valley Rovers	0-11	11	Inniscarra
7	Alan Fenton	Castlelyons	0-11	11	Inniscarra
7	Noel McNamara	Kilworth	0-11	11	Aghada
7	Richard Sweetnam	Courcey Rovers	0-11	11	Castlelyons
