= 2018 Cork Premier Intermediate Hurling Championship =

- Dates: 15 April 2018 – 29 October 2018
- Teams: 16
- Sponsor: Evening Echo
- Champions: Charleville (1st title); Daniel O'Flynn (captain); John Moloney (manager)
- Runners-up: Courcey Rovers; Dan Lordan (captain)

Tournament statistics
- Matches played: 28
- Goals scored: 62 (2.21 per match)
- Points scored: 818 (29.21 per match)
- Top scorer(s): Tadhg O'Sullivan (1-49)

The 2018 Cork Premier Intermediate Hurling Championship was the 15th staging of the Cork Premier Intermediate Hurling Championship since its establishment by the Cork County Board in 2004. The draw for the opening round took place on 10 December 2017. The championship began on 15 April 2018 and ended on 29 October 2018.

On 29 October 2018, Charleville won the championship after a 0-15 to 0-14 defeat of Courcey Rovers in a final replay at Páirc Uí Rinn. It was their first ever championship title in this grade.

Tadhg O'Sullivan from the Courcey Rovers club was the championship's top scorer with 1-49.

== Teams ==
A total of 16 teams contested the Premier Intermediate Championship, including 14 teams from the 2017 premier intermediate championship, one promoted team from the 2017 intermediate championship and one relegated team from the 2017 senior championship.

== Team changes ==
=== To Championship ===
Relegated from the Cork Senior Hurling Championship

- Youghal

Promoted from the Cork Intermediate Hurling Championship

- Aghada

=== From Championship ===
Relegated to the Cork Intermediate Hurling Championship

- Tracton

Promoted to the Cork Senior Hurling Championship

- Kanturk

== Results ==
=== Round 1 ===
15 April 2018 Round 1	Kilworth	1-09 - 1-14	Charleville	Kildorrery
	N McNamara 0-8 (6f, 1 '65'), W Condon 1-0, J McCarthy 0-1.	Report	D Fitzgibbon 0-8 (4f), PJ Copse 1-0, T Hawe 0-2, M Kavanagh 0-2 (1f).	Referee: C Lane (Banteer)

22 April 2018 Round 1	Courcey Rovers	3-18 - 0-19	Inniscarra	Liam MacCarthy Park, B'garvan
	S Twomey 3-0, T O’Sullivan 0-8 (0-6 frees), D Duggan (frees), J O’Neill, G Moloney and J McCarthy 0-2 each, D Lordan and K Moloney 0-1 each.	Report	M Coleman 0-8 (all frees), P Farmer 0-4 (all frees), C Rice 0-3, S O’ Donoghue, D O’Keeffe (free), O McCarthy and S O’ Mahony 0-1 each.	Referee: I McCarthy (Bandon)

28 April 2018 Round 1	Fermoy	2-16 - 0-16	Carrigaline	Ballincollig
	S Ahern (1-3), L Coleman (0-6f), J Hutchings (1-0), K Morrison (0-3), D Geary (0-2f), P Clancy (0-1), A Ahern (0-1).	Report	B Kelleher (0-9f), R O'Shea (0-4, 3f), S O'Brien (0-1), D Drake (0-1f), K McIntyre (0-1).	Referee: B Murphy (Carrigtwohill)

28 April 2018 Round 1	Fr. O'Neill's	3-08 - 0-10	Aghada	Killeagh
	J Millerick 1-1, D Dalton 1-0, E Conway 1-0, D Harrington 0-3, L O'Driscoll 0-2, M O'Keeffe 0-1, C Broderick 0-1.		C Fleming 0-3, P O'Neill 0-3, C Terry 0-3, K O'Hanlon 0-1.	Referee: S Stokes (Tullylease)

28 April 2018 Round 1	Youghal	1-15 - 0-19	Castlelyons	Killeagh
	B Moloney 0-4, J O'Mahon 1-0, D O'Connell 0-3, A Joyce 0-2, B Cooper 0-2, S Smiddy 0-1, A Frahill-O'Connor 0-1, K Browne 0-1, J Grace 0-1.		A Fenton 0-9, M Spillane 0-3, R Fenton 0-3, C Spillane 0-2, D Lawlor 0-1.	Referee: G Scully (Killeagh)

28 April 2018 Round 1	Valley Rovers	2-14 - 0-11	Blarney	Páirc Uí Rinn, Cork
	R Butler 0-5, C O'Leary 0-4, J Cottrell 1-0, R O'Sullivan 1-0, E O'Reilly 0-2, J Walsh 0-2, C Butler 0-1.		M Cremin 0-4, D Whyte 0-2, M Coleman 0-2, P Philpott 0-2, D Hanlon 0-1.	Referee: M Maher (St. Finbarr's)

29 April 2018 Round 1	Mallow	0-20 - 2-11	Cloyne	Páirc Mac Gearailt, Fermoy
	K O'Connor 0-9, C Murphy 0-6, P Healy 0-3, D Moynihan 0-1, K Sheehan 0-1.		B O'Shea 0-8, M Cahill 2-0, I Cahill 0-2, K Dennehy 0-1.	Referee: M Maher (St. Finbarr's)

29 April 2018 Round 1	Watergrasshill	0-15 - 1-22	Ballinhassig	Blarney
	Shane O'Regan (corner-forward) 0-12, Shane O'Regan (centre-forward) 0-1, D McCarthy 0-1, D Dennehy 0-1.		S Coleman 0-10, C Reynolds 1-1, F O'Leary 0-4, P Collins 0-3, C Tyers 0-1, M Collins 0-1, D O'Donovan 0-1, S McCarthy 0-1.	Referee: J Murphy (Castletownroche)

=== Round 2 ===
18 August 2018 Round 2	Kilworth	4-16 - 1-10	Aghada	St. Catherine's Park, Ballynoe
	N McNamara 1-8, J Sheehan 1-1, W Condon 0-4, E Carey 1-0, J Saich 1-0, P Moakley 0-2, L Whelan 0-1.		W Leahy 0-5, B Morrissey 1-0, C Fleming 0-1, J Tynan 0-1, R Kennedy 0-1, K O'Hanlon 0-1, S O'Keeffe 0-1.	Referee: M Maher (St. Finbarr's)

24 August 2018 Round 2	Cloyne	1-20 - 2-13	Youghal	Killeagh
	A Walsh 0-7, D O'Sullivan 1-2, P O'Sullivan 0-3, C Mullins 0-2, B Walsh 0-2, K Dennehy 0-1, M Cahill 0-1, I Cahill 0-1, C O'Sullivan 0-1.		B Cooper 1-1, J O'Mahony 1-1, Barry Ring 0-2, L Desmond 0-2, A Frahill-O'Connor 0-2, B Moloney 0-2, D O'Connell 0-1, A Joyce 0-1, Brendan Ring 0-1.	Referee: D Kirwan (Éire Óg)

31 August 2018 Round 2	Inniscarra	3-13 - 0-19	Carrigaline	Ovens
	M Coleman 0-6, O McCarthy 1-2, C Casey 1-1, D O'Connell 1-0, L Ryan 0-2, D O'Keeffe 0-1, P O'Donoghue 0-1.		B Kelliher 0-5, R O'Shea 0-5, J McCarthy 0-3, S Corcoran 0-2, D Drake 0-1, K McIntyre 0-1, C Barry 0-1, D Cooney 0-1.	Referee: I McCarthy (Bandon)

31 August 2018 Round 2	Watergrasshill	1-14 - 1-12	Blarney	Mourne Abbey
	S O'Regan (midfield) 0-9, S O'Regan (full-forward) 1-2, S O'Callaghan 0-1, Dillon McCarthy 0-1, Gary O'Kelly-Lynch 0-1.		M Coleman 0-4, P Crowley 1-0, C Murphy 0-3, R Murphy 0-3, A McEvoy 0-1, D Whyte 0-1.

=== Relegation play-off ===
18 October 2018 Relegation play-off	Youghal	1-10 - 3-13	Blarney	Páirc Séamus de Barra, Carrigtwohill

=== Round 3 ===
8 September 2018 Round 3	Cloyne	1-12 - 1-15	Fr. O'Neill's	Castlemartyr
	A Walsh 0-6, P O'Sullivan 1-2, D Cahill 0-1, K Dennehy 0-1, M Cahill 0-1, C O'Sullivan 0-1.		D Dalton 0-8, K O'Sullivan 1-1, C Broderick 0-2, B Dunne 0-1, E Conway 0-1, G Millerick 0-1, L O'Driscoll 0-1.	Referee: D Kirwan (Éire Óg)

9 September 2018 Round 3	Fermoy	1-16 - 0-17	Watergrasshill	Páirc Uí Rinn, Cork
	L Coleman 0-8, S Aherne 1-2, P de Róiste 0-1, B O'Sullivan 0-1, K Morrison 0-1, J Hutchings 0-1, D Geary 0-1, A Creed 0-1.		S O'Regan (no. 9) 0-11, E Barry 0-2, S O'Regan (no. 14) 0-2, J McCarthy 0-1, S O'Callaghan 0-1.	Referee: M Maher (St. Finbarr's)

9 September 2018 Round 3	Charleville	2-20 - 0-12	Inniscarra	Fr. Con Buckley Park, Buttevant
	M Kavanagh 1-4, D Fitzgibbon 0-5, T Hawe 0-4, A Cagney 1-0, D O'Flynn 0-3, J Doyle 0-1, A Dennehy 0-1, C Collins 0-1, K O'Connor 0-1.		M Coleman 0-5, C Buckley 0-2, D O'Keeffe 0-2, T O'Connor 0-2, A McCarthy 0-1.	Referee: N Wall (Carrigaline)

15 September 2018 Round 3	Kilworth	2-17 - 1-20	Mallow	Castletownroche
	W Condon 2-3, N McNamara 0-7, E Carey 0-4, J Sheehan 0-2, L Whelan 0-1.		S Hayes 0-10, C Murphy 1-2, P Lyons 0-4, P Herlihy 0-2, P Healy 0-1, A Luttrell 0-1.	Referee: S Stokes (Tullylease)

22 September 2018 Round 3 replay	Kilworth	3-09 - 2-10	Mallow	Castletownroche
	N McNamara 1-5, P Moakley 2-1, L Whelan 0-1, E Carey 0-1, W Condon 0-1.		S Hayes 1-5, P Herlihy 1-2, C Murphy 0-2, P Lyons 0-1.	Referee: M Maher (St. Finbarr's)

=== Quarter-finals ===
14 September 2018 Quarter-final	Castlelyons	1-14 - 0-17	Courcey Rovers	Páirc Uí Rinn, Cork
	M Spillane 1-3, A Spillane 0-4, A Fenton 0-3, B Murphy 0-3, R O'Regan 0-1.		T O'Sullivan 0-9, S Twomey 0-2, K Moloney 0-2, M O'Donovan 0-1, J McCarthy 0-1, J O'Neill 0-1, S Nyhan 0-1.	Referee: J Larkin (Ballinora)

16 September 2018 Quarter-final	Ballinhassig	0-14 - 1-22	Valley Rovers	Ballymartle Sportsfield, Riverstick
	S Coleman 0-4, F O'Leary 0-4, C Reynolds 0-2, P Coomey 0-2, C Desmond 0-1, C Tyers 0-1.		C O'Leary 1-8, J Walsh 0-4, K Canty 0-3, E O'Reilly 0-3, C Butler 0-2, J Cottrell 0-1, R Butler 0-1.	Referee: G Scully (Killeagh)

21 September 2018 Quarter-final replay	Castlelyons	0-14 - 1-15	Courcey Rovers	Páirc Uí Rinn, Cork
	M Spillane 0-8, C Spillane 0-2, E Maye 0-1, D Lordan 0-1, A Spillane 0-1, A Fenton 0-1.		T O'Sullivan 1-9, F Lordan 0-3, O Crowley 0-2, S Nyhan 0-1.	Referee: D O'Farrell Jnr (Mitchelstown)

23 September 2018 Quarter-final	Charleville	1-17 - 1-11	Fermoy	Fr. Con Buckley Park, Buttevant
	D Fitzgibbon 0-5, M Kavanagh 0-5, J Kennedy 1-0, D O'Flynn 0-3, A Cagney 0-3, C Collins 0-1.		K Morrison 1-1, L Coleman 0-4, D Geary 0-3, J Hutchings 0-2, S Molloy 0-1.	Referee: C McAllister (Aghada)

29 September 2018 Quarter-final	Fr. O'Neill's	2-17 - 1-16	Kilworth	Páirc Uí Rinn, Cork
	D Dalton 1-7, B Dunne 1-4, L O'Driscoll 0-2, C Broderick 0-2, T Millerick 0-1, P McMahon 0-1.		N McNamara 0-8, J Sheehan 1-2, E Carey 0-2, J Saich 0-1, L Whelan 0-1, W Condon 0-1, J McCarthy 0-1.	Referee: S Stokes (Freemount)

=== Semi-finals ===
6 October 2018 Semi-final	Charleville	4-17 - 2-14	Fr. O'Neill's	Moore Park, Kilworth
	A Cagney 2-1, M Kavanagh 0-7, D Fitzgibbon 1-3, C Collins 1-0, D O'Flynn 0-3, J Doyle 0-2, T Hawe 0-1.		D Dalton 1-4, E Conway 1-1, P McMahon 0-2, L O'Driscoll 0-2, J Millerick 0-1, B Dunne 0-1, K O'Sullivan 0-1, M O'Keeffe 0-1, C Broderick 0-1.	Referee: S Stokes (Tullylease)

6 October 2018 Semi-final	Courcey Rovers	1-13 - 0-16	Valley Rovers	Riversitck Sportsfield, Riverstick
	S Twomey 1-3, T O'Sullivan 0-6, J O'Neill 0-3, J McCarthy 0-1.		C O'Leary 0-4, K Canty 0-3, J Walsh 0-2, C Desmond 0-2, E O'Reilly 0-2, R O'Sullivan 0-2, C Butler 0-1.	Referee: C McAllister (Aghada)

13 October 2018 Semi-final replay	Courcey Rovers	0-14 - 0-12	Valley Rovers	Páirc Uí Rinn, Cork
	J O'Neill 0-3, S Twomey 0-3, S Nyhan 0-3, T O'Sullivan 0-2, D Lordan 0-1, O Crowley 0-1, K Moloney 0-1.		C O'Leary 0-7, E O'Reilly 0-2, J Walsh 0-2, R O'Sullivan 0-1.	Referee: D Copps (Ballyhea)

=== Finals ===
21 October 2018 Final	Charleville	1-09 - 0-12	Courcey Rovers	Páirc Uí Chaoimh, Cork
	D Fitzgibbon 1-2, M Kavanagh 0-4, J Doyle 0-1, D O'Flynn 0-1, T Hawe 0-1.		T O'Sullivan 0-8, S Twomey 0-2, S Nyhan 0-1, K Moloney 0-1.	Attendance: 4,618; Referee: M Maher (St. Finbarr's)

29 October 2018 Final replay	Charleville	0-15 - 0-14	Courcey Rovers	Páirc Uí Rinn, Cork
	D Fitzgibbon (0-4 frees), A Cagney (0-3), M Kavanagh (frees) and K O’Connor (0-2 each), T Hawe, J Doyle, J Buckley, D O’Flynn (0-1 each).	Report	T O’Sullivan (0-7 frees), S Nyhan (0-2 frees), J O’Neill (0-2, 0-1 sl), K Moloney, S Twomey and J McCarthy (0-1 each).	Referee: J Larkin (Ballinora)

== Championship statistics ==
=== Top scorers ===
Top scorer overall

Rank	Player	Club	Tally	Total	Matches	Average
1	Tadhg O'Sullivan	Courcey Rovers	1-49	52	7	7.42
2	Noel McNamara	Kilworth	2-36	42	5	8.40
3	Darragh Fitzgibbon	Charleville	2-27	33	6	5.50
4	Shane O'Regan	Watergrasshill	0-32	32	3	10.66
5	Declan Dalton	Fr. O'Neill's	3-19	28	4	9.00
6	Mark Kavanagh	Charleville	1-24	27	6	4.50
7	Chris O'Leary	Valley Rovers	1-23	26	4	6.50
8	Seán Twomey	Courcey Rovers	4-11	23	7	3.28
9	Michael Coleman	Inniscarra	0-19	19	3	6.33
10	Will Condon	Kilworth	3-09	18	5	3.60
10	Seán Hayes	Mallow	1-15	18	2	9.00
10	Liam Coleman	Fermoy	0-18	18	3	6.00

Top scorers in a single game

Rank	Player	Club	Tally	Total	Opposition
1	Tadhg O'Sullivan	Courcey Rovers	1-09	12	Castlelyons
1	Shane O'Regan	Watergrasshill	0-12	12	Ballinhassig
3	Noel McNamara	Kilworth	1-08	11	Aghada
3	Chris O'Leary	Valley Rovers	1-08	11	Ballinhassig
3	Shane O'Regan	Watergrasshill	0-11	11	Fermoy
6	Declan Dalton	Fr. O'Neill's	1-07	10	Kilworth
6	Seán Coleman	Ballinhassig	0-10	10	Watergrasshill
6	Seán Hayes	Mallow	0-10	10	Kilworth
9	Seán Twomey	Courcey Rovers	3-00	9	Inniscarra
9	Will Condon	Kilworth	2-03	9	Mallow
9	Brian Kelleher	Carrigaline	0-09	9	Fermoy
9	Tadhg O'Sullivan	Courcey Rovers	0-09	9	Castlelyons
9	Shane O'Regan	Watergrasshill	0-09	9	Blarney
9	Alan Fenton	Castlelyons	0-09	9	Youghal
9	Killian O'Connor	Mallow	0-09	9	Cloyne
