= Cathal Kiely =

Irish hurler

Personal information
- Native name: Cathal Ó Cadhla (Irish)
- Born: 2001 (age 24–25) Kilcormac, County Offaly, Ireland

Sport
- Sport: Hurling
- Position: Midfield
Club
- Years: Club
- Kilcormac-Killoughey
Club titles
- Offaly titles: 0
Inter-county*
| Years | County | Apps (scores) |
| 2023- | Offaly | 0 (0-00) |
Inter-county titles
- Leinster titles: 0
- All-Irelands: 0
- NHL: 0
- All Stars: 0
- *Inter County team apps and scores correct as of 21:24, 13 March 2023.

Cathal Kiely (born 2001) is an Irish hurler who plays for Offaly SHC club Kilcormac-Killoughey and at inter-county level with the Offaly senior hurling team.

== Career ==
Kiely first played hurling at juvenile and underage levels with the Kilcormac-Killoughey club. He won an Offaly U20 HC title after a defeat of Belmont in the final in 2021. Kiely had already joined the club's senior team by this stage, and top scored with 0-07 when Kilcormac were beaten by Shinrone in the 2022 SHC final.

Kiely first appeared on the inter-county scene for Offaly as top scorer during the 2018 All-Ireland MHC. He immediately progressed to the under-20 team and was overall top scorer during the 2019 All-Ireland U20HC. He was Offaly's top scorer for his three-year under-20 tenure. Kiely made his senior team debut during the 2023 Walsh Cup.

== Personal life ==
His brother, Cillian Kiely, has also lined out with Offaly.

== Honours ==
Kilcormac-Killoughey

- Offaly Under-20 Hurling Championship: 2021
