= James Keating (hurler) =

Irish hurler

Personal information
- Native name: Séamus Ó Céitinn (Irish)
- Born: 1999 (age 26–27) Kildorrery, County Cork, Ireland
- Occupation: Student

Sport
- Sport: Hurling
- Position: Full-back
Club
- Years: Club
- Kildorrery
Club titles
- Cork titles: 0
Inter-county*
Years	County	Apps (scores)
2020-	Cork	0 (0-00)
Inter-county titles
- Munster titles: 0
- All-Irelands: 0
- NHL: 0
- All Stars: 0
- *Inter County team apps and scores correct as of 19:57, 7 January 2020.

James Keating (born 1999) is an Irish hurler who plays for Cork Championship club Kildorrery and at inter-county level with the Cork senior hurling team. He usually lines out as a full-back or centre-back.

== Honours ==
Mitchelstown CBS

- Munster Colleges Senior B Hurling Championship (1): 2017

Kildorrery

- North Cork Under-21 A Hurling Championship (1): 2018

Cork

- Munster Under-21 Hurling Championship (1): 2018
- Munster Minor Hurling Championship (1): 2017

Sporting positions
Preceded by Seán O'Leary-Hayes	Cork Under-20 Hurling Team Captain; 2019	Succeeded by Conor O'Callaghan
