= 2019 All-Ireland Under-20 Hurling Championship =

Championship Details
- Dates: 25 May 2019 - 24 August 2019
- Teams: 14

All Ireland Champions
- Winners: Tipperary (11th win)
- Captain: Craig Morgan
- Manager: Liam Cahill

All Ireland Runners-up
- Runners-up: Cork
- Captain: James Keating
- Manager: Denis Ring

Provincial Champions
- Munster: Tipperary
- Leinster: Kilkenny
- Ulster: Not Played
- Connacht: Not Played

Championship Statistics
- Matches Played: 14
- Total Goals: 39 (2.78 per game)
- Total Points: 504 (36.00 per game)
- Top Scorer: Cathal Kiely (0-44)

The 2019 All-Ireland Under-20 Hurling Championship was the inaugural staging of the All-Ireland Under-20 Championship and the 56th staging overall of a hurling championship for players between the minor and senior grades. Prior to 2019 an All-Ireland Under-21 Championship was held. The championship began on 25 May 2019 and ended on 24 August 2019.

Tipperary were the defending champions and went on to retain the title.

On 24 August 2019, Tipperary won the championship following a 5-17 to 1-18 defeat of Cork in the All-Ireland final. This was their 11th All-Ireland title overall and their second title in succession.

Offaly's Cathal Kiely was the championship's top scorer with 0-44.

== Team summaries ==
Team	Colours	Most recent success	
Team	Colours	All-Ireland	Provincial
Antrim	Saffron and white		2016
Carlow	Green, red and yellow		
Clare	Saffron and blue	2014	2014
Cork	Red and white	1998	2018
Dublin	Blue and navy		2016
Galway	Maroon and white	2011	2018
Kilkenny	Black and amber	2008	2017
Laois	Blue and white		1983
Limerick	Green and white	2017	2017
Offaly	Green, white and gold		2000
Tipperary	Blue and gold	2018	2010
Waterford	White and blue	2016	2016
Westmeath	Maroon and white		
Wexford	Purple and gold	1965	2015

== Provincial championships ==
=== Leinster Under-20 Hurling Championship ===
Play-off round 1

25 May 2019 Play-off round 1	Antrim	2-16 - 0-25 (aet)	Carlow	National Sports Campus, Abbotstown
	S Elliott 2-12 (7f); D Smyth, D McEnhill, O Donnelly, D Kilgore 0-1 each.	Report	C Whelan 0-13 (10f); D Sheehan 0-4; J Nolan 0-3, C Kavanagh 0-2; D Tobin, J O'Neill, C Treacy 0-1 each Antrim:	Referee: C Mooney (Dublin)

27 May 2019 Play-off round 1	Westmeath	0-09 - 1-23	Offaly	Cusack Park, Mullingar
	J Gillen 0-3, J Smyth 0-2, C McKeogh 0-1, E Ahearn 0-1, C O’Brien 0-1, E Daly 0-1.	Report	C Kiely 0-9, D Nally 0-5, C Ryan 1-0, C Langton 0-2, J Murphy 0-2; C Sampson 0-1; C Doyle 0-1; B Kealey 0-1, B Duignan 0-1, J Keenaghan 0-1.	Referee: S Stack (Dublin)

Play-off round 2

16 June 2019 Play-off round 2	Carlow	1-17 - 1-20	Offaly	Netwatch Cullen Park, Carlow
	C Whelan (1-10, 0-6f, 0-3'65), D Tobin (0-2); C Kavanagh (0-1), D Sheehan (0-1), J Nolan (0-1), O Ryan (0-1), C Treacy (0-1).	Report	C Kiely (0-10f), J Murphy (1-1); B Duignan (0-3), D Nally (0-2, 1'65), C Sampson (0-2); C Langton (0-2).	Referee: M Murtagh

Quarter-finals

24 June 2019 Quarter-final	Kilkenny	5-21 - 0-10	Laois	Nowlan Park, Kilkenny
	N Brassil 0-7 (5f), A Mullen 2-0, E Cody 0-4, S Donnelly 1-1, J Bergin and S Ryan 1-0 each, E Shefflin 0-3, E O’Shea 0-2, A Brennan, J Molloy, D Blanchfield and C Brennan 0-1 each	Report	E Gaughan 0-6 (4f), P Delaney (1f), J Keyes, D Conway and J Bergin 0-1 each.	Referee: R Fitzsimons (Offaly)

26 June 2019 Quarter-final	Dublin	2-25 - 1-29	Offaly	Parnell Park, Dublin
	C Derwin 0-16 (13f), B Ryan 1-2, M Dunne 1-0, K Desmond 0-2, K Burke, I Ó hEithir, D Ó Floinn, L McDwyer, L Murphy 0-1 each.	Report	C Kiely 0-20 (15f, 2 ’65’), C Langton 0-4, C Quinn 1-0 J Murphy (1f) 0-2, R Hogan, K Sampson, D Nally 0-1 each.	Referee: J Heffernan (Wexford)

Semi-finals

3 July 2019 Semi-final	Offaly	1-18 - 2-20	Wexford	Bord na Móna O'Connor Park, Tullamore
	C Kiely 0-5 (5fs), D Nally (2fs) and C Langton 0-4 each, J Murphy 1-1, B Kealey, B Duignan, C Ryan and K Sampson 0-1 each.	Report	R Banville 0-10 (6fs, 1 65), C Clancy 1-1, D Doyle 1-0, S Keane-Carroll 0-3, N Murphy, C McGuckin, C Scallan, S O’Connor, E Murphy, J Reck 0-1 each.	Attendance: 5,172; Referee: D Hughes (Carlow)

4 July 2019 Semi-final	Galway	1-15 - 1-19	Kilkenny	Bord na Móna O'Connor Park, Tullamore
	M Kennedy 0-7f, S Neary 1-0, C Walsh & D Reilly 0-2 each, D Kilcommins, D Loftus, J Fleming & D Mannion 0-1 each.	Report	N Brassil 0-7 (0-5f, 0-1 ’65), E Cody 1-3, S Ryan 0-3, S Donnelly & C Heary 0-2 each, A Mullen & A Brennan 0-1 each.	Attendance: 3,095; Referee: J Owens (Wexford)

Final

17 July 2019 Final	Wexford	0-18 - 1-17	Kilkenny	Innovate Wexford Park, Wexford
	R Banville 0-7 (frees), S O’Connor 0-3, C McGuckin, C Fitzhenry, C Turner (1 free) 0-2 each, J Reck, C Scallan 0-1 each.	Report	N Brassil 0-5 (4 frees), E Shefflin 1-2, S Ryan, E Cody, D Blanchfield 0-2 each, J Brennan, S Donnelly, E O’Shea, M Carey 0-1 each.	Attendance: 6,612; Referee: M Murtagh (Westmeath)

=== Munster Under-20 Hurling Championship ===
Quarter-final

3 July 2019 Quarter-final	Cork	1-20 - 0-16	Limerick	Páirc Uí Rinn, Cork
	S O’Regan 1-6, C Hanifin 0-5 (0-3 frees), B Turnbull 0-4, D Connery 0-3 (0-1 sideline), L O’Shea 0-2.	Report	P O’Brien 0-8 (0-6 frees, 0-2 65), R Connolly 0-3, M McCarthy 0-2, R Duff, P O’Riordan, J Ryan 0-1 each.	Attendance: 3,354; Referee: T Walsh (Waterford)

Semi-finals

9 July 2019 Semi-final	Tipperary	3-23 - 0-10	Waterford	Semple Stadium, Thurles
	J Morris 0-13 (11f), C Bowe 2-2, J Fogarty 1-1, B Seymour 0-4 (3f), G O'Connor 0-1, S Hayes 0-1, A Ormond 0-1.	Report	B Power 0-8 (8f), T Barron 0-1, J Power 0-1.	Referee: J Murphy (Limerick)

10 July 2019 Semi-final	Cork	0-23 - 0-15	Clare	Páirc Uí Rinn, Cork
	S O’Regan (0-5), C Hanifin (0-5), B Turnbull (0-4), T O’Connell (0-4), S Twomey (0-3), B Roche (0-1); D Connery (0-1).	Report	A McCarthy (0-5), D Ryan (0-4), R Considine (0-2); M Rodgers (0-2), K McDermott (0-1); A Moriarty (0-1), T Agnew (0-1).	Attendance: 2,965; Referee: K Jordan (Tipperary)

Final

23 July 2019 Final	Tipperary	3-15 - 2-17	Cork	Semple Stadium, Thurles
	C Bowe 1-4; J Morris 1-3 (0-2 frees); K O’Kelly 1-0; A Ormond 0-2; B O’Mara, C Connolly, J Cahill, G O’Connor, B Seymour, D Woods 0-1 each.	Report	S Twomey 1-2; C Hanifin 0-4 (3 frees); S O’Regan 0-3; E Sheehan 1-0; D Connery (1 free), B Turnbull 0-2 each; E Roche, T O’Connell, P Power, R Walsh 0-1 each.	Referee: T Walsh (Waterford)

== All-Ireland Under-20 Hurling Championship ==
Semi-finals

The Leinster champions play the Munster beaten finalists and the Munster champions play the Leinster beaten finalists.

3 August 2019 Semi-finals	Kilkenny	0-13 - 1-16	Cork	O'Moore Park, Portlaoise
	E Cody 0-6 (5f), N Brassil 0-4 (2f), A Brennan 0-1, E Shefflin 0-1, C Heary 0-1.	Report	T O’Connell 1-10 (6f, 2 “65s”), B Turnbull 0-2 (2f), R Walsh 0-2, S O’Regan 0-1, S Kennefick 0-1.	Referee: J Murphy (Limerick)

4 August 2019 Semi-finals	Tipperary	8-16 - 1-15	Wexford	Nowlan Park, Kilkenny
	J Morris 1-5 (0-2 frees); A Ormond, B Seymour, J Cahill 2-1 each; S Hayes 1-1; C Bowe, D Woods (1 free) 0-2 each; B O’Mara, J Fogarty, J Ryan 0-1 each.	Report	R Banville 0-8 frees; S Keane-Carroll 1-0; S O’Connor, D Doyle 0-2 each; C Clancy, N Murphy, C Turner 0-1 each.	Referee: C McAllister (Cork)

Final

24 August 2019 Final	Tipperary	5-17 - 1-18	Cork	LIT Gaelic Grounds, Limerick
	B Seymour 2-5 (0-1 sideline), J Morris 0-8 (0-3f, 0-1 ’65), A Ormond 1-2, J Cahill 1-1, C Bourke 1-0, C Bowe 0-1.	Report	B Turnbull 0-8 (0-7f), T O’Connell 1-2 (0-2 ’65), R Walsh, D Connery (0-1f) 0-2 each, C O’Callaghan, R Downey, S O’Regan, B Roche 0-1 each.	Attendance: 18,652; Referee: L Gordon (Galway)

== Statistics ==
=== Top scorers ===
Top scorers overall

Rank	Player	County	Tally	Total	Matches	Average
1	Cathal Kiely	Offaly	0-44	44	4	11.00
2	Jake Morris	Tipperary	2-29	35	4	8.75
3	Ciarán Whelan	Carlow	1-23	26	2	13.00
4	Ross Banville	Wexford	0-25	25	3	8.33
5	Niall Brassil	Kilkenny	0-24	24	4	6.00
6	Billy Seymour	Tipperary	4-11	23	4	5.75
6	Tommy O'Connell	Cork	2-17	23	5	4.60
8	Brian Turnbull	Cork	0-20	20	5	4.00
9	Shane O'Regan	Cork	1-16	19	5	3.80
10	Conor Bowe	Tipperary	3-09	18	4	4.50
10	Seán Elliott	Antrim	2-12	18	1	18.00
10	Eoin Cody	Kilkenny	1-15	18	4	4.50

Top scorers in a single game

Rank	Player	Club	Tally	Total	Opposition
1	Cathal Kiely	Offaly	0-20	20	Dublin
2	Seán Elliott	Antrim	2-12	18	Carlow
3	Cian Derwin	Dublin	0-16	16	Offaly
4	Tommy O'Connell	Cork	1-10	13	Kilkenny
4	Ciarán Whelan	Carlow	1-10	13	Offaly
4	Jake Morris	Tipperary	0-13	13	Waterford
4	Ciarán Whelan	Carlow	0-13	13	Antrim
8	Billy Seymour	Tipperary	2-05	11	Cork
9	Cathal Kiely	Offaly	0-10	10	Carlow
9	Ross Banville	Wexford	0-10	10	Offaly
