= 2019 All-Ireland Under-20 Hurling Championship final =

2019 All-Ireland Under-20 Hurling Championship Final
- Event: 2019 All-Ireland Under-20 Hurling Championship
Cork	Tipperary
1-18	5-17
- Date: 24 August 2019
- Venue: LIT Gaelic Grounds, Limerick
- Referee: Liam Gordan (Galway]

The 2019 All-Ireland Under-20 Hurling Championship final is a hurling match that was played on 24 August 2019 to determine the winners of the 2019 All-Ireland Under-20 Hurling Championship - the inaugural season of the All-Ireland Under-20 Hurling Championship and the 56th season overall — a tournament organised by the Gaelic Athletic Association for the champion and runner-up teams of Leinster and Munster. The final will be contested by Cork and Tipperary, who both represent the province of Munster.

The final was the second time that teams from the same province played each other in a decider. It was also the second successive All-Ireland final to feature both Cork and Tipperary.

The final was broadcast live as part of GAA Beo on TG4, presented by Mícheál Ó Domhnaill.

The victory for Tipperary put them in joint first place with 11 titles in the roll of honour alongside both Cork and Kilkenny.

== Match ==
=== Details ===
24 August 2019
18:00

Cork	1-18 – 5-17	Tipperary
B Turnbull 0-8 (0-7f), T O’Connell 1-2 (0-2 ’65), R Walsh, D Connery (0-1f) 0-2 each, C O’Callaghan, R Downey, S O’Regan, B Roche 0-1 each.	Report	B Seymour 2-5 (0-1 sideline), J Morris 0-8 (0-3f, 0-1 ’65), A Ormond 1-2, J Cahill 1-1, C Bourke 1-0, C Bowe 0-1.

LIT Gaelic Grounds, Limerick
Attendance: 18,652
Referee: L Gordon (Galway)

Cork	Tipperary
