= All-Ireland Under-17 Hurling Championship =

GAA Hurling All-Ireland Under-17 Championship
- Current season or competition: 2017 All-Ireland Under-17 Hurling Championship
- Irish: Craobh Iomána Fé-17 na hÉireann
- Founded: 2017; 8 years ago
- Region: Ireland (GAA)
- No. of teams: 4
- Title holders: Cork (1st title)
- Most titles: Cork (1 titles)
- Official website: Official website

The GAA Hurling All-Ireland Under-17 Championship is a once-off special hurling championship for male players under the age of 17. Organised by the Gaelic Athletic Association (GAA), the championship will be awarded for the first and only time in 2017.

== Qualification ==
The GAA Hurling All-Ireland Under-17 Championship features four teams in the final tournament. Many more teams contest the two provincial under-17 championships with the two respective champions, Antrim and Galway automatically qualifying for the All-Ireland Championship.

| Province | Championship | Teams provided |
|---|---|---|
| Leinster GAA | Leinster Under-17 Hurling Championship | 1 (champions) |
| Munster GAA | Munster Under-17 Hurling Championship | 1 (champions) |

== History ==
The All-Ireland Under-17 Hurling Championship began in 2017. It was the sixth All-Ireland championship to be created after the senior, intermediate, junior, under-21 and minor grades. The championship was created as a result of the minor championship changing its age category from under-18 to under-17, with the aim of providing players born after 1 January 2000 the chance to represent their county at underage level.

== Format ==
The All-Ireland Championship is a knockout tournament, however, there is a certain element of seeding. The Munster and Leinster champions are put on opposite sides of the draw in separate semi-finals. The Antrim and Galway teams are also put on opposite sides of the draw in separate semi-finals. Unlike the minor championship, the Munster and Leinster runners-up are not allowed to contest the All-Ireland series.

== Finals Listed By Year ==
| Year | Winners | Score | Runners-up | Score | Venue | Winning Captain |
|---|---|---|---|---|---|---|
| 2017 | Cork | 1-19 | Dublin | 1-17 | Croke Park | Brian Roche |
