= 2020 All-Ireland Under-20 Hurling Championship =

National sporting competition

Championship Details
- Dates: 19 October 2020 - 10 July 2021
- Teams: 15

All Ireland Champions
- Winners: Cork (12th win)
- Captain: Conor O'Callaghan
- Manager: Pat Ryan

All Ireland Runners-up
- Runners-up: Dublin
- Captain: Andrew Dunphy
- Manager: Paul O'Brien

Provincial Champions
- Munster: Cork
- Leinster: Dublin
- Ulster: Not Played
- Connacht: Not Played

Championship Statistics
- Matches Played: 14
- Total Goals: 40 (2.85 per game)
- Total Points: 464 (33.14 per game)
- Top Scorer: Liam Murphy (0-37)

The 2020 All-Ireland Under-20 Hurling Championship was the second staging of the All-Ireland Under-20 Championship and the 57th staging overall of a hurling championship for players between the minor and senior grades. The championship was scheduled to begin in May 2020, however, it was postponed indefinitely due to the impact of the COVID-19 pandemic on Gaelic games. The championship eventually began on 19 October 2020 and, after being suspended once again, ended on 10 July 2021.

Tipperary entered the championship as the defending champions in search of a third successive title, however, they were beaten by Cork in the Munster final. Kerry fielded a team in the Munster Championship for the first time since 2005.

On 10 July 2021, Cork won the championship following a 2-19 to 1-18 defeat of Dublin in the All-Ireland final at UPMC Nowlan Park. This was a record 12th All-Ireland title overall and their first title since 1998.

Dublin's Liam Murphy was the championship's top scorer with 0-37.

== Format change ==
The championship was scheduled to begin in May 2020, however, it was postponed indefinitely due to the coronavirus pandemic in Ireland. When the championship resumed, time constraints led to a revision of the format, with the All-Ireland semi-finals being abolished, thus resulting in no second chance for the defeated Leinster and Munster finalists.

== Team summaries ==
Team	Colours	Most recent success	
Team	Colours	All-Ireland	Provincial
Antrim	Saffron and white		2016
Carlow	Green, red and yellow		
Clare	Saffron and blue	2014	2014
Cork	Red and white	1998	2018
Dublin	Blue and navy		2016
Galway	Maroon and white	2011	2018
Kerry	Green and yellow		
Kilkenny	Black and amber	2008	2019
Laois	Blue and white		1983
Limerick	Green and white	2017	2017
Offaly	Green, white and gold		2000
Tipperary	Blue and gold	2019	2019
Waterford	White and blue	2016	2016
Westmeath	Maroon and white		
Wexford	Purple and gold	1965	2015

== Results ==
=== Leinster Under-20 Hurling Championship ===
==== Round 1 ====
21 October 2020 Round 1	Antrim	1-08 - 2-22	Dublin	Louth Centre of Excellence
	S Elliott (0-6, 2fs, 1’65); D Murphy (1-0); P Boyle, R McAteer (0-1 each).	Report	L Murphy (0-9, 3fs, 1’65); K Desmond (1-3); M Murphy (0-5); E Gibbons (1-0 pen); D Purcell (0-2); M Sweeney, D Power, L McDwyer (0-1 each).

21 October 2020 Round 1	Laois	1-15 - 0-15	Carlow	MW Hire O'Moore Park
	D Delaney 0-5 (frees), M Hennessy 1-2, C Conroy, C Byrne, A Kirwan (1 free, 1 65) 0-2 each, T Keyes, T Cuddy 0-1 each.	Report	C Kavanagh 0-8 (4 frees), J Doyle 0-3, O Ryan, C Treacy, J McCullagh, S Treacy 0-1 each.

21 October 2020 Round 1	Offaly	2-22 - 3-09	Westmeath	Faithful Fields
	C Kiely 0-12 (0-7fs), C Donoghue 0-5, L O’Connor 1-1, C O’Meara 1-0, P Cantwell, K McDermott, L Nolan, L Kavanagh 0-1 each.	Report	R Keyes 1-3 (1-0 pen, 0-3fs), D McGrath 1-2, M Cunningham 1-0, O McCabe, E Daly, C McKeogh, P Weir Norris 0-1 each.

==== Quarter-finals ====
11 December 2020 Quarter-final	Laois	0-07 - 4-21	Galway	MW Hire O'Moore Park
	D Delaney 0-4f, T Keyes 0-1, F Holland 0-1, J Phelan 0-1.	Report	D O’Shea 2-7 (1-0p, 0-6f, 0-1 ’65), A Connaire 1-2, M Kennedy 1-0, D Kilcommins 0-2, S McDonagh 0-2 (1f), C Walsh 0-2, S Neary 0-1, I McGlynn 0-1, J Fleming 0-1, A Prendergast 0-1, J O’Donoghue 0-1, C Killeen 0-1.

12 December 2020 Quarter-final	Offaly	0-16 - 2-16	Dublin	St. Brendan's Park
	C Kiely 0-10 (0-7f, 0-2 65s), K Sampson, K McDermott, R Carty, C Donoghue, C O’Meara, B Duignan 0-1 each	Report	L Murphy 0-5 frees, D McBride 1-1 (0-1 sideline), E Gibbons 0-3f, K Desmond 1-0, T Kinnane & M Murphy 0-2 each, B Ryan, D Power & P Linehan 0-1 each.	Referee: P Murphy (Carlow)

==== Semi-finals ====
18 December 2020 Semi-final	Kilkenny	1-11 - 0-19	Galway	O'Moore Park
	E Guilfoyle (1-7, 7 frees); C Heary (0-2); E Cody, I Byrne (0-1 each).	Report	D O'Shea (0-12, 11 frees); C Flaherty (1 free), D Shaughnessy, S Neary, A Prendergast, A Connaire, S McDonagh, J Fleming (0-1 each).	Referee: R Fitzsimons (Offaly)

18 December 2020 Semi-final	Wexford	1-10 - 1-19	Dublin	Netwatch Cullen Park
	R Banville 0-6 (0-4f), G Murphy-Butler 1-0, S O’Connor 0-2, C Mahoney, D Codd 0-1 each.	Report	L Murphy 0-10 (0-5f, 0-1 ‘65), E Gibbons 1-2 (1-2f), K Desmond 0-2, D Leavy, D McBride, M Sweeney, L Dunne, P Linehan 0-1 each.	Referee: S Cleere (Kilkenny)

==== Final ====
23 June 2021 Final	Dublin	1-20 - 1-18	Galway	Bord na Móna O'Connor Park
	Liam Murphy 0-7f, Lee Gannon and Dara Purcell 0-4 each, Mark Sweeney 1-0, Darach McBride and Micheal Murphy 0-2 each, Eddie Gibbons 0-1f	Report	Donal O'Shea 0-8 (0-6f, 1 '65) Mark Kennedy 0-6, John Cooney 1-0, Dylan Shaughnessy, Ian McGlynn, John Fleming, Fionn McDonagh 0-1 each	Referee: David Hughes (Kilkenny); Man of the Match: Lee Gannon (Whitehall Colmcille)

=== Munster Under-20 Hurling Championship ===
==== Quarter-finals ====
19 October 2020 Quarter-final	Tipperary	1-19 - 0-12	Clare	Semple Stadium
	C Bowe (0-7); D Ryan (1-4, 1-0 pen, 0-3 frees); A Ormond (0-3); K McCarthy, S Ryan (0-2 each); G O’Connor (0-1 free).	Report	C Galvin (0-5, 0-3 frees); M Rodgers (0-4, 0-1 free); R Mounsey, W Halpin, C Hegarty (0-1 each).

19 October 2020 Quarter-final	Kerry	2-10 - 2-24	Cork	Austin Stack Park
	M Slattery 1-4 (1-2 f, 0-65), N Guerin 1-0, D Slattery 0-2, K Goulding 0-2 f, D Moriarty, D Casey 0-1 each.	Report	B Roche 1-3, B Hayes 1-2, T O'Connell 0-5 (0-3 f), D O'Leary 0-4, S O'Regan 0-3, B O'Sullivan, E Carey, C O'Brien 0-2 each, A Connolly 0-1.	Referee: M Kennedy (Tipperary)

==== Semi-finals ====
12 December 2020 Semi-final	Limerick	0-21 - 2-29 (aet)	Cork	LIT Gaelic Grounds
	A O’Connor (0-8, 0-7 frees); C O’Neill (0-5); C Ryan (0-3, 0-3 frees); D O’Shea (0-2, 0-1 free); J Considine, B Nix, M McCarthy (0-1 each).	Report	B Hayes (1-4); S Barrett (1-3); A Connolly (0-6, 0-4 frees); C O’Brien (0-5, 0-3 sc); D Connery (0-4, 0-4 frees); B Roche, T O’Connell (0-1 free), S O’Regan (0-2 each); B O’Sullivan (0-1 free).	Referee: R McGann (Clare)

15 December 2020 Semi-final	Waterford	3-16 - 5-18 (aet)	Tipperary	Fraher Field
	M Kiely (2-2, 1-0 pen), K Mahony (0-4 frees), C Power (1-0), J Burke, A Kirwan and J Power (0-2 each), C Wadding, R Halloran, S Fitzgerald and G Fives (0-1 each).	Report	D Ryan (2-10, 0-8 frees), C Bowe (1-3), A Ormond (1-1), M Hackett (1-0), K Maher, K McCarthy G O’Connor, J Devaney (0-1 each).	Referee: J O'Halloran (Limerick)

==== Final ====
23 December 2020 Final	Cork	1-16 - 1-14	Tipperary	Páirc Uí Chaoimh
	J Cahalane (1-1), C O’Brien, S Barrett, A Connolly (frees) (0-4 each); B Roche, D Connery (free), D Flynn (0-1 each).	Report	A Ormond (1-3); D Ryan (0-5, 4 frees); E Connolly (0-4, frees); K O’Kelly, C Bowe (0-1 each).	Referee: J Murphy (Limerick)

=== All-Ireland Under-20 Hurling Championship ===
==== Final ====
10 July 2021 Final	Cork	2-19 - 1-18	Dublin	UPMC Nowlan Park
	P Power 1-1, S Twomey 1-0, S Barrett, A Connolly (0-2f), D Connery (0-2f) 0-3 each, D Flynn, T O’Connell, C O’Brien (0-1 sideline), B Hayes 0-2 each, J Cahalane 0-1.	Report	L Murphy 0-6 (0-3f), D Purcell 0-4, L McDwyer 1-0, M Murphy 0-3, E Gibbons (0-2f), K Desmond 0-2 each, D Power 0-1.	Referee: J Keenan (Wicklow)

== Statistics ==
=== Top scorers ===
Top scorers overall

Rank	Player	County	Tally	Total	Matches	Average
1	Liam Murphy	Dublin	0-37	37	5	7.40
2	Donal O'Shea	Galway	2-27	33	3	11.00
3	Devon Ryan	Tipperary	3-19	28	3	9.33
4	Cathal Kiely	Offaly	0-22	22	2	11.00
5	Brian Hayes	Cork	2-08	14	4	3.50
5	Eddie Gibbons	Dublin	2-08	14	5	2.80
5	Conor Bowe	Tipperary	1-11	14	3	4.66
5	Alan Connolly	Cork	0-14	14	4	3.50
5	Colin O'Brien	Cork	0-14	14	4	3.50
10	Andrew Ormond	Tipperary	2-07	13	3	4.33
10	Kevin Desmond	Dublin	2-07	13	5	2.60
10	Shane Barrett	Cork	1-10	13	4	3.25

Top scorers in a single game

Rank	Player	Club	Tally	Total	Opposition
1	Devon Ryan	Tipperary	2-10	16	Waterford
2	Donal O'Shea	Galway	2-07	13	Laois
3	Cathal Kiely	Offaly	0-12	12	Westmeath
3	Donal O'Shea	Galway	0-12	12	Kilkenny
5	Eoin Guilfoyle	Kilkenny	1-07	10	Galway
5	Liam Murphy	Dublin	0-10	10	Wexford
5	Cathal Kiely	Offaly	0-10	10	Dublin
8	Liam Murphy	Dublin	0-09	9	Antrim
9	Michael Kiely	Waterford	2-02	8	Tipperary
9	Ciarán Kavanagh	Carlow	0-08	8	Laois
9	Aidan O'Connor	Limerick	0-08	8	Cork
9	Donal O'Shea	Galway	0-08	8	Dublin

=== Miscellaneous ===
- In winning the Leinster final, Dublin defeated Galway for the first time in the history of the championship.
