= 2017 All-Ireland Under-17 Hurling Championship =

Championship Details
- Dates: 11 April 2017 – 6 August 2017

All Ireland Champions
- Winners: Cork (1st win)
- Captain: Brian Roche
- Manager: John Considine

All Ireland Runners-up
- Runners-up: Dublin
- Captain: Mark Grogan
- Manager: Fintan Clandillon

Provincial Champions
- Munster: Cork
- Leinster: Dublin
- Ulster: Not Played
- Connacht: Not Played

Championship Statistics
- Matches Played: 14
- Top Scorer: Liam Murphy

The 2017 All-Ireland Under-17 Hurling Championship was the first and only staging of the All-Ireland Under-17 Hurling Championship, the Gaelic Athletic Association's primary inter-county hurling championship for boys under the age of seventeen. The championship began on 11 April 2017 and ended on 6 August 2017.

On 6 August 2017, Cork won the championship following a 1–19 to 1–17 defeat of Dublin in the All-Ireland final.

== Fixtures/results ==
=== Leinster Under-17 Hurling Championship ===
First round

First round	Offaly	w/o - scr.	Westmeath

First round	Kildare	w/o - scr.	Louth

First round	Meath	w/o - scr.	Wicklow

Second round

19 April 2017 Second round	Wexford	0-14 - 0-22	Kilkenny	Taghmon
	R Banville (0-7, 5 frees); C Doyle (0-2), B Stafford (0-1); K O'Donohoe (0-1), R Broaders (0-1), S O'Connor (0-1), J Lawlor (0-1 free).	Report	J Buggy (0-11, 9 frees, 1 '65), C Kinsella (0-3), J Phelan (0-2), C Brennan (0-2), D O'Neill (0-2); A Brennan (0-1), D Fwanba (0-1).	Referee: C Mooney (Dublin)

19 April 2017 Second round	Dublin	1-20 - 0-15	Offaly	Parnell Park, Dublin

Quarter-finals

26 April 2017 Quarter-final	Kildare	2-6 - 3-18	Wexford	Hawkfield
		Report		Referee: S Guinan (Offaly)

26 April 2017 Quarter-final	Meath	0-5 - 6-25	Offaly	Dunganny

Semi-finals

20 May 2017 Semi-final	Dublin	2-20 - 0-17	Wexford	Parnell Park, Dublin
	L Murphy 0-9 (0-8f), B Ryan 0-6, T Aherne, A Carroll 1-0 each, K Desmond 0-2, M Murphy, S Clerkin, K Kirwan 0-1 each.	Report	R Banville 0-11 (0-10f), E Doyle, M Gahan (0-1f), B Stafford, S Delaney, S O’Connor, C Doyle 0-1 each.	Referee: C Daly (Kildare)

21 May 2017 Semi-final	Offaly	0-11 - 2-17	Kilkenny	St. Brendan's Park, Birr

Final

18 June 2017 Final	Dublin	3-17 - 2-10	Kilkenny	O'Moore Park, Tullamore
	L Murphy 0-10 (0-7f), B Ryan 1-3, M Grogan, L McDwyer 1-0 each, M Murphy 0-2 (0-1f), K Kirwan, K Desmond 0-1 each.	Report	C Brennan 1-1 (0-1f), J Buggy 0-4 (0-3f, 0-1 ‘65’), C Drennan 1-0, J Phelan 0-2, I Walsh, K Egan, D Fwamba 0-1 each.	Referee: C Daly (Kildare)

=== Munster Under-17 Hurling Championship ===
Quarter-finals

11 April 2017 Quarter-final	Clare	3-25 - 1-3	Kerry	Cusack Park, Ennis
	M Hynes 0-8, T Barry 1-3, C Bourke 1-3, A McCarthy 0-5, L Fitzgerald 1-0, C Shanagher 0-2, D O'Brien 0-2, C Hassett 0-1, R Molloy 0-1.		D O'Donoghue 1-0, D Goggin 0-1, S O'Halloran 0-1, B Walsh 0-1.	Referee: S Stokes (Cork)

11 April 2017 Quarter-final	Limerick	0-6 - 0-16	Cork	Gaelic Grounds, Limerick
	S O'Connor 0-4, J Considine 0-1, M McCarthy 0-1.		C O'Brien 0-6, T O'Connell 0-5, D O'Hanlon 0-3, J Stack 0-1, K Farmer 0-1.	Referee: K Jordan (Tipperary)

Semi-finals

17 April 2017 Semi-final	Clare	0-14 - 2-16	Waterford	Cusack Park, Ennis
14:00	A McCarthy 0-7, L Fitzpatrick 0-2, C Shanagher 0-1, M Hynes 0-1, T Barry 0-1, D O'Brien 0-1, O Cahill 0-1.		C Power 0-7, A Kirwan 1-2, N Power 1-0, I Daly 0-3, K Bennett 0-2, J Devine 0-1, B Cooke 0-1.	Referee: M Maher (Cork)

18 April 2017 Semi-final	Cork	2-22 - 2-9	Tipperary	Páirc Uí Rinn, Cork
19:00	C O'Brien 0-6, B Roche 1-2, D Connery 0-5, T O'Connell 0-4, D Hanlon 1-0, O McCarthy 0-2, S Twomey 0-1, C O'Callaghn 0-1, J Stack 0-1.		R McCormack 2-1, B McLoughney 0-2, S Kirwan 0-2, G Loughnane 0-1, K McCarthy 0-1, S Doyle 0-1, M Downey 0-1.	Referee: T Walsh (Waterford)

Final

25 April 2017 Final	Waterford	1-12 - 3-13	Cork	Fraher Field, Dungarvan
			O McCarthy 2-1, T O Connell (0-1 pen) 1-1, C O Brien (fs), D Connery 0-4 each, B Roches 0-2, D Hanlon 0-1.

=== All-Ireland Under-17 Hurling Championship ===
Semi-finals

27 July 2017 Semi-final	Dublin	w/o - scr.	Antrim

27 July 2017 Semi-final	Cork	1-19 - 1-17	Galway	Semple Stadium, Thurles
	C O’Brien 1-10 (0-7 f, 0-2 sl), D Connery 0-3 (0-2 65, 0-1 f), T O’Connell, B Murphy, B Roche 0-2 each.	Report	C Molloy 0-9 (0-4 f, 0-1 65), N Coen 1-1, Enda Egan (0-1 sl), J Fleming 0-2 each, D O’Brien, M Kennedy, P Creaven 0-1 each.

Final

6 August 2017 Final	Dublin	1-17 - 1-19	Cork	Croke Park, Dublin
12:00	L Murphy 0-7 (0-7f), E Gibbons 1-1 (1-1 pen), L Gannon, B Ryan 0-2 each, E O’Donnell, T Aherne, M Murphy (0-1f), M Grogan, K Kirwan 0-1 each.	Report	D Connery 0-6 (0-5f), Colin O’Brien 0-5 (0-3f), D Hanlon 0-3, J Stack 1-0, B Murphy, O McCarthy 0-2 each, Cormac O’Brien 0-1.	Referee: J Keane (Galway)
