= Munster Under-17 Hurling Championship =

Gaelic sports event

Munster GAA Hurling Under-17 Championship
- Current season or competition: 2017 Munster Under-17 Hurling Championship
- Irish: Craobh Iomána Fé-17 na Mumhan
- Founded: 2017
- Region: Munster (GAA)
- No. of teams: 6
- Official website: http://munster.gaa.ie/

The Munster GAA Hurling Under-17 Championship is an annual championship of hurling for male players under the age of 17 and is organised by the Munster Council of the Gaelic Athletic Association (GAA). The championship will be awarded on an annual basis, with the first tournament beginning in 2017.

The series of games are played during April. The championship is played on a straight knock-out basis whereby once a team lost they are eliminated from the series.
