= 2023 Fitzgibbon Cup =

Irish collegiate hurling tournament

- Dates: 18 January - 18 February 2023
- Teams: 12
- Sponsor: Electric Ireland
- Champions: University of Limerick (8th title); Bryan O'Mara (captain); Mark Rodgers (captain); Brian Ryan (manager)
- Runners-up: University of Galway; Darren O'Brien (captain); Jeffrey Lynskey (manager)

Tournament statistics
- Matches played: 19
- Goals scored: 50 (2.63 per match)
- Points scored: 673 (35.42 per match)
- Top scorer(s): Evan Niland (1-52)

The 2023 Fitzgibbon Cup was the 106th staging of the Fitzgibbon Cup since its establishment by the Gaelic Athletic Association in 1912. It is sponsored by Electric Ireland, and known as the Electric Ireland HE GAA Fitzgibbon Cup for sponsorship purposes. The draw for the group stage fixtures took place on 14 December 2022. The cup ran from 18 January to 18 February 2023.

University of Limerick were the defending champions.

The Fitzgibbon Cup final was played on 18 February 2023 at the SETU Waterford Complex, between University of Limerick and University of Galway, in what was their second consecutive meeting in the final. University of Limerick won the match by 4–19 to 1–13 to claim their eighth Fitzgibbon Cup title overall and a second title in succession.

University of Galway's Evan Niland was the top scorer with 1-52.

== Group A ==
=== Group A table ===
Advance to knockout stage

Team	Matches				Score			Pts
Team	Pld	W	D	L	For	Against	Diff	Pts
University of Galway	2	2	0	0	56	38	18	4
SETU Waterford	2	1	0	1	38	49	-11	2
MTU Cork	2	0	0	1	42	49	-7	0

=== Group A fixtures and results ===
18 January 2023 Round 1	MTU Cork	2-16 - 2-21	University of Galway	MTU Cork Grounds
	L O’Shea 0-8 (0-4f), C Beausang 0-4, B Roche, S Walsh 1-1 each, C Joyce, B Kehoe 0-1 each.	Report	E Niland 1-11 (0-3f), G Thomas 1-1, N Collins 0-3, D O’Brien, O Flannery 0-2 each, I McGlynn, T Killeen 0-1 each.	Referee: J Murphy (Limerick)

25 January 2023 Round 2	University of Galway	2-23 - 1-13	SETU Waterford	Dangan Grounds
	E Niland 0-12 (0-7f, 0-1 65); A Connaire 1-1; D O’Brien 0-3; J O’Meara 1-0; T Killeen, B Concannon, G Thomas 0-2 each; N Collins 0-1.	Report	R Halloran 1-9 (8f); P Cody 0-2; J Harkin, S Walsh 0-1 each.

1 February 2023 Round 3	SETU Waterford	1-19 - 0-20	MTU Cork	SETU Waterford Complex
	R Halloran 0-11f, P Fitzgerald 1-0, S Walsh, J Prendergast, S Bennett, M O’Brien 0-2 each.	Report	L O’Shea 0-10 (0-8f), C Joyce 0-4 (0-2f, 0-2 65), B Roche, S Walsh 0-2 each, C Beausang, S Quirke 0-1 each.

== Group B ==
=== Group B table ===
Advance to knockout stage

Team	Matches				Score			Pts
Team	Pld	W	D	L	For	Against	Diff	Pts
DCU Dóchas Éireann	2	2	0	0	50	46	4	4
SETU Carlow	2	0	1	1	41	42	-1	1
Mary Immaculate College	2	0	1	1	43	46	-3	1

=== Group B fixtures and results ===
18 January 2023 Round 1	SETU Carlow	1-16 - 1-16	Mary Immaculate College	SETU Carlow Grounds
	C Nolan 0-5, 0-3f, K Ryan 1-1, C Kenny 0-4, 0-1f, T Keyes 0-3, M Troy 0-2, R Foley 0-1.	Report	Devon Ryan 0-8, 0-7f, 0-1 line cut, C Daly 1-0, Diarmuid Ryan, J Gillane (2 frees), J Devaney 0-2 each, C O’Brien, J Nolan 0-1 each.	Referee: J Owens (Wexford)

25 January 2023 Round 2	Mary Immaculate College	2-18 - 2-21	DCU Dóchas Éireann	MIC Grounds
	Devon Ryan 1-9 (7 frees, 1 '65), D McLaughlin 1-3, D Cahill 0-3, R Power, C O'Brien and Diarmuid Ryan 0-1 each.	Report	R Banville 0-8 (5 frees, 1 '65), R Lawlor 1-1, E Gibbons 1-0 (1-0 free), J Ryan and D Power 0-2 each, C Hennessy, N Murphy, E Daly, M O'Connell, B Duignan, R Boran, J Barrett and C Kehoe 0-1 each.	Referee: F Horgan (Tipperary)

1 February 2023 Round 3	DCU Dóchas Éireann	3-14 - 1-19	SETU Carlow	DCU Sportsgrounds
	R Banville 1-4 (4fs), C Hennessy 1-1, C Kehoe 1-0, E Gibbons 0-2fs, M O’Connell 0-2, D Power 0-1, E Daly 0-1, R Lawlor 0-1, C Murphy 0-1, N Murphy 0-1.	Report	E Cody 1-12 (1-10fs, 0-2 ‘65s), T Keyes 0-4, Chris Nolan 0-1, M Troy 0-1, Conor Nolan 0-1

== Group C ==
=== Group C table ===
Advance to knockout stage

Team	Matches				Score			Pts
Team	Pld	W	D	L	For	Against	Diff	Pts
University College Cork	2	2	0	0	40	32	8	4
University College Dublin	2	1	0	1	39	41	-2	2
Maynooth University	2	0	0	2	41	47	-6	0

=== Group C fixtures and results ===
19 January 2023 Round 1	University College Cork	1-18 - 0-19	Maynooth University	The Mardyke
	R Cotter 0-6 (0-5f, 0-1 pen), S Barrett 0-5, J O’Connor 1-2, C Cahalane 0-2, C O’Brien, S Daly, N O’Leary 0-1 each.	Report	B Drennan 0-8f, E Landy 0-3, C Drennan (0-1f, 0-1sl), A Hickey 0-2 each, P Blanchfield, L Hogan, C Kelly, C Fogarty 0-1 each.

26 January 2023 Round 2	Maynooth University	0-22 - 1-23	University College Dublin	Maynooth North Campus
	B Drennan (0-11, 10 frees), C Drennan 0-4 (1 free), C Boran (0-2), C Kelly (0-2), A Hickey (0-1), P Blanchfield (0-1), C Fogarty (0-1).	Report	D O’Shea (0-12, 9 frees), E Guilfoyle (1-1), C Foley (0-3), J Duggan (0-2), C O’Sullivan (0-2), L Murphy (0-2), C Prenderville (0-1).

2 February 2023 Round 3	University College Dublin	0-13 - 0-19	University College Cork	David Billings Park
	D O’Shea 0-7 f, D Purcell 0-3, C O’Sullivan, E Guilfoyle, C Rogers 0-1 each.	Report	D Flynn 0-9 (0-8 f, 0-1 65), S Barrett 0-3 (0-1 f), E Carey 0-2, L Elliott, S Daly, C Cahalane, R Cotter, B Hayes 0-1 each.

== Group D ==
=== Group D table ===
Advance to knockout stage

Team	Matches				Score			Pts
Team	Pld	W	D	L	For	Against	Diff	Pts
University of Limerick	2	2	0	0	59	32	27	4
ATU Galway	2	1	0	1	43	50	-7	2
TUS Midwest	2	0	0	2	37	57	-20	0

=== Group D fixtures and results ===
19 January 2023 Round 1	ATU Galway	2-10 - 2-23	University of Limerick	Duggan Park
	K Cooney 0-7 (0-6f, 0-1 65), R Murphy 1-2, C Folan 1-0, E Duggan 0-1.	Report	G O’Connor 0-11 (0-7f, 0-1 65), M Rogers 1-4 (0-2f), M Kiely 1-1, R Shelly 0-1, K Sampson 0-1, S Twomey 0-1, C Darcy 0-1, J Power 0-1, C O’Neill 0-1, J Power 0-1.

26 January 2023 Round 2	University of Limerick	2-24 - 1-13	TUS Midwest	UL Grounds
	G O’Connor 0-12 (5f, 3 ’65); S Twomey 1-2; M Rogers 1-1, C O’Neill 0-3; C Coughlan 0-2; C Galvin, B O’Meara, J Power, K Sampson 0-1 each.	Report	R Mounsey 1-7 (4f); A Shanagher 0-2; D Tynan, K McCarthy, A Tynan, B Óg O’Dwyer 0-1 each.

2 February 2023 Round 3	TUS Midwest	1-18 - 2-21	ATU Galway	Moylish Grounds
	R Mounsey 0-6 (1f); A Shanagher 1-2; K Shelly 0-4 (3f); E Fitzpatrick 0-3; A Tynan 0-2; K McCarthy 0-1.	Report	K Cooney 0-8 (frees); C Folan, N Coen 1-2 each; D Shaughnessy, R Murphy 0-2 each; D Nevin, D Parr, A Shaughnessy, J Forde, J Grealish 0-1 each.

== Knockout stage ==
=== Quarter-finals ===
8 February 2023 Quarter-final	DCU Dóchas Éireann	2-16 - 3-16	SETU Waterford	DCU Sportsgrounds
	R Banville 0-10 (0-8f), C Hennessy 1-1, C Kehoe 1-0, M O’Connell 0-2, C Clancy 0-1, D Power 0-1, R Boran 0-1.	Report	R Halloran 0-8 (0-8f), S Walsh 0-5, P Fitzgerald 1-0, G Fives 1-0, A Kirwan 1-0, B Nolan 0-1, P Cody 0-1, J Harkin 0-1.	Referee: K Brady (Louth)

9 February 2023 Quarter-final	University of Galway	0-20 - 2-11	SETU Carlow	Dangan Grounds
	E Niland 0-12 (0-11f), A Connaire 0-2, D O’Brien 0-2, O Flannery 0-1, J O’Meara 0-1, B Concannon 0-1, E Lawless 0-1.	Report	E Cody 0-5 (0-5f), T Keyes 1-1, C Nolan 1-1, C Burke 0-2, K Ryan 0-1, C Kenny 0-1.

9 February 2023 Quarter-final	University College Cork	0-20 - 1-13	ATU Galway	The Mardyke
	D Flynn 0-14 (0-11f), P Power, S Barrett 0-2 each, B Hayes, R Cotter 0-1 each.	Report	K Cooney 0-7 (0-3f), R Murphy 1-2, C Fahy 0-2, D Shaughnessy, E Hunt 0-1 each.	Referee: J Murphy (Limerick)

9 February 2023 Quarter-final	University of Limerick	4-19 - 0-10	University College Dublin	UL Grounds
	M Kiely 3-0, J Power 1-2, G O'Connor 0-5 (2 frees), A English 0-4, S Twomey 0-3, M Rodgers, C Coughlan, B O'Mara, B O'Sullivan and C Flaherty 0-1 each.	Report	D O'Shea 0-6 (6 frees), C Prenderville and L Murphy 0-2 each.

=== Semi-finals ===
16 February 2023 Semi-final	University College Cork	2-18 - 1-24	University of Galway	Gurteen Grounds
	D Flynn 0-7 (0-6f, 0-1 65), B Hayes 1-2, S Barrett 1-1, D Hogan 0-3, G Millerick 0-2, C Cahalane, P Power, D Connery (0-1f) 0-1 each.	Report	E Niland 0-12 (0-10f, 0-1 65), A Connaire 0-4, G Thomas 1-0, D O’Brien, N Collins, B Concannon 0-2 each, I McGlynn, T Killeen 0-1 each.

16 February 2023 Semi-final	SETU Waterford	0-16 - 0-19	University of Limerick	SETU Waterford Complex
	R Halloran 0-8 (7fs), P Fitzgerald 0-4, B Nolan (f), S Walsh, P Cody, G Fives 0-1 each.	Report	G O’Connor 0-13 (11fs), C Coughlin 0-3, B O’Mara 0-2, D Hannify 0-1.

=== Final ===
18 February 2023 Final	University of Limerick	4-19 - 1-13	University of Galway	SETU Waterford Complex
	M Kiely 4-1, G O'Connor 0-9 (7fs, 1 65), M Rogers (1f), A English 0-2 each, B O'Sullivan, B O'Mara, D Corcoran, S Twomey, C Coughlin 0-1 each.	Report	E Niland 0-5 (3fs), G Thomas 1-0, N Collins 0-3, B Concannon 0-2, O Flannery, P McGann, T Killeen 0-1 each.	Referee: C Lyons (Cork)

== Statistics ==
=== Top scorers ===
Overall

Rank	Player	Club	Tally	Total	Matches	Average
1	Evan Niland	University of Galway	1-52	55	5	11.00
2	Gearóid O'Connor	University of Limerick	0-50	50	5	10.00
3	Reuben Halloran	SETU Waterford	1-36	39	4	9.75
4	Darragh Flynn	UCC	0-30	30	4	7.50
5	Michael Kiely	University of Limerick	8-02	26	5	5.20
6	Ross Banville	Dublin City University	1-22	25	3	8.33
6	Donal O'Shea	UCD	0-25	25	3	8.33
8	Kevin Cooney	ATU Galway	0-22	22	3	7.33
9	Devon Ryan	Mary Immaculate College	1-17	20	2	10.00
9	Eoin Cody	SETU Carlow	1-17	20	2	10.00

In a single game

Rank	Player	Club	Tally	Total	Opposition
1	Eoin Cody	SETU Carlow	1-11	14	DCU Dóchas Éireann
1	Evan Niland	University of Galway	1-11	14	MTU Cork
1	Darragh Flynn	UCC	1-11	14	ATU Galway
4	Michael Kiely	University of Limerick	4-01	13	University of Galway
4	Gearóid O'Connor	University of Limerick	0-13	13	SETU Waterford
6	Reuben Halloran	SETU Waterford	1-09	12	University of Galway
6	Devon Ryan	Mary Immaculate College	1-09	12	Dublin City University
6	Evan Niland	University of Galway	0-12	12	SETU Waterford
6	Donal O'Shea	UCD	0-12	12	Maynooth University
6	Gearóid O'Connor	University of Limerick	0-12	12	TUS Midwest
6	Evan Niland	University of Galway	0-12	12	SETU Carlow
6	Evan Niland	University of Galway	0-12	12	UCC

== Awards ==
Team of the Year

1. Dean Mason
2. Eoin Lawless
3. T. J. Brennan
4. Eoin Roche
5. Tiernan Killeen
6. Bryan O'Mara
7. Cormac O'Brien
8. Brian O'Sullivan
9. Jack Prendergast
10. Brian Concannon
11. Gearóid O'Connor
12. Seán Twomey
13. Reuben Halloran
14. Michael Kiely
15. Aaron Ryan
