= Dara Maher =

Irish hurler

Personal information
- Native name: Dara Ó Meachair (Irish)
- Born: 19/08/2001 Shinrone, County Offaly, Ireland
- Occupation: Sales assistant

Sport
- Sport: Hurling
- Position: Right corner-back
Club
- Years: Club
- Shinrone
Club titles
- Offaly titles: 1
College
- Years: College
- 2020-2024: University of Limerick
College titles
- Fitzgibbon titles: 2
Inter-county
- Years: County
- 2022-present: Offaly
Inter-county titles
- Leinster titles: 0
- All-Irelands: 0
- NHL: 0
- All Stars: 0

Dara Maher (born August 19, 2001) is an Irish hurler. At club level he plays with Shinrone and at inter-county level with the Offaly senior hurling team.

== Career ==
Maher first played hurling to a high standard as a student at Coláiste Phobal Ros Cré. He later lined out with the University of Limerick and was part of their back-to-back Fitzgibbon Cup-winning teams in 2022 and 2023.

At club level, Maher first played at juvenile and underage ranks with the Shinrone club before progressing to adult level. He had his first success in 2020 when Shinrone beat Coolderry to win the Offaly IHC in 2020. Maher was also part of Shinrone's first ever Offaly SHC-winning team in 2022.

Maher first appeared on the inter-county scene for Offaly during an unsuccessful spell with the minor team in 2028. He later spent three unsuccessful seasons with the under-20 team. Maher was also drafted onto the senior team and made his debut in a National Hurling League defeat by Galway in 2022. He won a Joe McDonagh Cup medal as an unused substitute in 2024 after a defeat of Laois in the final.

== Honours ==
University of Limerick

- Fitzgibbon Cup: 2022, 2023

Shinrone

- Offaly Senior Hurling Championship: 2022
- Offaly Intermediate Hurling Championship: 2020

Offaly

- Joe McDonagh Cup: 2024
