= Dean Mason =

Dean Mason may refer to:

- Dean Mason (footballer), English-born Montserratian footballer
- Dean Mason (hurler), Irish hurler

== See also ==
- Dean (given name)
- Mason (surname)
