= 2022 Fitzgibbon Cup =

Irish collegiate hurling tournament

- Dates: 19 January - 19 February 2022
- Teams: 14
- Sponsor: Electric Ireland
- Champions: University of Limerick (7th title); Bryan O'Mara (captain); Brian Ryan (manager)
- Runners-up: NUI Galway; Jeffrey Lynskey (manager)

Tournament statistics
- Matches played: 25
- Goals scored: 79 (3.16 per match)
- Points scored: 1018 (40.72 per match)
- Top scorer(s): Evan Niland (0-79)

The 2022 Fitzgibbon Cup was the 105th staging of the Fitzgibbon Cup since its establishment by the Gaelic Athletic Association in 1912. It is sponsored by Electric Ireland, and known as the Electric Ireland HE GAA Fitzgibbon Cup for sponsorship purposes. The draw for the group stage fixtures took place on 14 December 2020. The 2022 Fitzgibbon Cup started with the group stage on 19 January 2022 and ended on 19 February 2022.

University College Cork were the defending champions, however, they were beaten by Institute of Technology, Carlow at the quarter-final stage.

The final was played on 19 February 2022 at the Institute of Technology, Carlow, between the University of Limerick and NUI Galway, in what was their first ever meeting in a final. The University of Limerick won the match by 1–21 to 2–15 to claim their seventh Fitzgibbon Cup title overall and a first title since 2018.

NUI Galway's Evan Niland was the top scorer with 0-79.

== Group stage ==
=== Group A ===
==== Group A table ====
Advance to knockout stage

Team	Matches				Score			Pts
Team	Pld	W	D	L	For	Against	Diff	Pts
NUI Galway	3	3	0	0	70	49	21	6
University College Cork	3	2	0	1	69	59	10	4
Mary Immaculate College	3	0	1	2	66	80	-14	1
University College Dublin	3	0	1	2	71	88	-17	1

==== Group A fixtures and results ====
19 January 2022 Round 1	Mary Immaculate College	0-19 - 1-21	University College Cork	MICL Grounds
	Devon Ryan 0-11 (0-9f, 0-2 65), J Gillane (0-1 sideline), P Wall, Diarmuid Ryan 0-2 each, C O’Brien, A Ormond 0-1 each.	Report	W Henn 0-8 (0-6f, 0-1 65), P Power, M Kehoe 0-4 each, S Barrett 1-2 (0-1f), C Cahalane 0-2, R Connolly 0-1.

19 January 2022 Round 1	University College Dublin	1-18 - 1-21	NUI Galway	Belfield Grounds
	D O’Shea 0-11 (8f, 1 ’65’), E Guilfoyle 1-1, L Murphy, K Lahiff 0-2 each, T Hannan, C Foley 0-1 each.	Report	E Niland 0-12 (8f), J Fleming 0-5, C Lynch 0-3, F McDonagh 1-0, B Concannon 0-1.

26 January 2022 Round 2	University College Cork	3-22 - 1-14	University College Dublin	Mardyke Arena
	M Kehoe 1-6, P Power 1-2, C Cahalane 1-1, D Connery 0-4, W Henn 0-4 (0-1 free, 0-1 65), N O’Leary, S Barrett, R Downey, S Kenefick and S Condon 0-1 each.	Report	D O’Shea 0-9 (0-6 frees, 0-1 65), D O Floinn 1-0, E Guilfoyle, C Foley, L Murphy, S Ennis, and E McCormack 0-1 each.

26 January 2022 Round 2	NUI Galway	1-20 - 2-09	Mary Immaculate College	Dangan Sports Grounds
	E Niland 0-10 (0-8f), B Concannon 1-3, C Caulfield 0-1, M Gill 0-1, I McGlynn 0-1, D Kilcommins 0-1, C Walsh 0-1, C Lynch 0-1, M Kennedy 0-1.	Report	D Ryan 0-6f, D Ryan 1-0, E Foudy 1-0pen, P Wall 0-2, C O’Brien 0-1.

2 February 2022 Round 3	Mary Immaculate College	6-15 - 6-15	University College Dublin	MICL Grounds
	De Ryan 2-7 (6f), A Ormond 1-3, J Devanney 1-1, D Mescall and Ja Ryan 1-0 each, P Wall 0-2, C O’Brien and B Butler 0-1 each;	Report	D O’Shea 0-9 (7f), D O Floinn and N Heffernan 2-0 each, C Foley and D O’Carroll 1-0 each, S Ennis and S Whelan 0-2 each, L O’Brien and K Lahiff 0-1 each.

2 February 2022 Round 3	NUI Galway	0-23 - 0-14	University College Cork	Dangan Sports Grounds
	E Niland 0-13 (0-12f), B Concannon 0-3, C Walsh 0-2, M Gill 0-1, I McGlynn 0-1, C Lynch 0-1, J Fleming 0-1, M Kennedy 0-1.	Report	S Barrett 0-6 (0-5f, 0-1 ’65), W Henn 0-3f, M Kehoe 0-3, C Bowe 0-1, S Kenefick 0-1.

=== Group B ===
==== Group B table ====
Advance to knockout stage

Team	Matches				Score			Pts
Team	Pld	W	D	L	For	Against	Diff	Pts
IT Carlow	3	2	1	0	71	66	5	5
Waterford IT	3	2	0	1	80	62	18	4
DCU Dóchas Éireann	3	1	1	1	58	56	2	3
Maynooth University	3	0	0	3	56	81	-25	0

==== Group B fixtures and results ====
19 January 2022 Round 1	Maynooth University	0-11 - 0-21	DCU Dóchas Éireann	Maynooth University North Campus
	J O’Dwyer 0-5 (2f); J Morris 0-2 (2f); J Buggy 0-3 (1f); C Boyle 0-1.	Report	J Bergin 0-6 (5f); S Currie 0-4; D Grey, R O’Connor 0-2 each, A Dunphy, K Burke, R Lawlor, C Clancy, D Blanchfield, C Brennan 0-1 each.

19 January 2022 Round 1	Waterford Institute of Technology	2-16 - 1-21	Institute of Technology, Carlow	WIT Sports Campus
	E O’Shea 1-6 (4fs), S Bennett 1-3, J Lyons 0-3, J Fives 0-2, T Barron, B Nolan (f)	Report	M Kavanagh 0-13 (9fs), S Casey (1-0), T Keyes, C Nolan 0-2 each, C Dunbar, R Higgins, A Redmond, J Kelly 0-1 each.

26 January 2022 Round 2	Institute of Technology, Carlow	2-22 - 2-19	Maynooth University	Institute of Technology, Carlow
	M Kavanagh (1-7, 5f); C Nolan (1-4): S Casey, R Higgins (0-3 each); R Dunbar (0-2); E Gaughan, C Kenny, J Cleere (0-1 each).	Report	C Drennan (1-6, 6f); J O’Dwyer (0-7, 6f); C Boyle (1-3); C Kelly (0-2); E Landy (0-1).

26 January 2022 Round 2	DCU Dóchas Éireann	0-18 - 2-20	Waterford Institute of Technology	DCU Sports Grounds
	J Bergin 0-10 (8f, 1 '65), R Banville, M O'Connell 0-2, R Hayes, S Currie (sideline), E Shefflin, C Brennan 0-1.	Report	E O'Shea 0-8 (7 f), G Fives, N O'Sullivan 1-1, B Nolan 0-3 (2f), C Kirwan, P Fitzgerald, S Bennett 0-2, M Butler 0-1.

2 February 2022 Round 3	DCU Dóchas Éireann	2-13 - 3-10	IT Carlow	DCU Sportsgrounds
	R Banville 0-8 (8f), R Lawlor, S Currie 1-0 each, D McBride, D Grey, J Bergin, D Blanchfield, J Ryan 0-1 each.	Report	M Kavanagh 1-7 (1-0 pen, 0-5f), N Brassil (f), S Casey 1-0, C Dunbar 0-2, C Nolan 0-1.

2 February 2022 Round 3	Waterford Institute of Technology	5-17 - 0-20	Maynooth University	WIT Sports Campus
	E O'Shea 0-9 (9fs), C Kirwan, P Fitzgerald 2-1 each, S Bennett 1-2, N O'Sullivan, O Reilly, R Smithers, D Geoghegan 0-1 each.	Report	J O'Dwyer 0-11 (6fs, 2 65s), E Landy 0-3, E Hosey, J Morris, C Boyle, J Ryan, J Brennan, C Drennan 0-1 each.

=== Group C ===
==== Group C table ====
Advance to knockout stage

Team	Matches				Score			Pts
Team	Pld	W	D	L	For	Against	Diff	Pts
Galway-Mayo IT	2	2	0	0	57	31	26	4
MTU Cork	2	1	0	1	45	41	4	2
Trinity College Dublin	2	0	0	2	30	60	-30	0

==== Group C fixtures and results ====
20 January 2022 Round 1	Galway-Mayo Institute of Technology	3-26 - 1-08	Trinity College Dublin	Carnmore Hurling Club
	C Gardiner 2-1, K Cooney 1-4, S McDonagh 0-5, C Fahy 0-5, A O'Shaughnessy 0-3, P Foley 0-2, P Commins 0-2, A Willis 0-1, J Forde 0-1, L Prendergast 0-1, D Mannion 0-1.		S O'Leary-Hayes 1-0, A Buggy 0-4, C Nagle 0-2, D Phelan 0-1, L O'Sullivan 0-1.

27 January 2022 Round 2	Trinity College Dublin	1-16 - 1-22	MTU Cork	Santry Sports Grounds
	D Leavy 1-8 (0-5f), S O’Leary Hayes 0-5, M Conroy, A Buggy, L O’Sullivan 0-1 each.	Report	L O’Shea 0-10 (0-5f), T Howard 0-5, A Walsh 1-2, A O’Connell, S Quirke 0-2 each, J Mulcahy 0-1.

3 February 2022 Round 3	MTU Cork	1-17 - 1-19	Galway-Mayo Institute of Technology	MTU Cork Campus
	L O’Shea 0-8 (0-6f), A Walsh 1-1, P Creedon 0-2, B Twomey, S Quirke, T Howard, C Hickey, D Hanlon, P O’Flynn 0-1 each.	Report	K Cooney 0-13 (0-11f), P Commins 1-1, D Mannion 0-2, P Foley, S McDonagh, E Egan 0-1 each.

=== Group D ===
==== Group D table ====
Advance to knockout stage

Team	Matches				Score			Pts
Team	Pld	W	D	L	For	Against	Diff	Pts
University of Limerick	2	2	0	0	85	31	54	4
TUS Midwest	2	1	0	1	38	61	-23	2
TU Dublin	2	0	0	2	33	64	-31	0

==== Group D fixtures and results ====
20 January 2022 Round 1	University of Limerick	5-30 - 0-14	TUS Midwest	UL Grounds
	M Rodgers 3-1; G O’Connor 1-7 (0-5 frees); M Kiely 0-6; N Brennan 0-5; S Twomey 1-2, C Connolly, B O’Mara 0-2 each; B O’Grady, M Gough, C O’Grady, 0-1 each.	Report	B Seymour 0-6 (0-3 frees, 0-1 pen); R Mounsey 0-3; S Taylor 0-2, K O’Kelly, S O’Loughlin, A Mulcahy 0-1 each.

27 January 2022 Round 2	TUS Midwest	0-24 - 0-16	TU Dublin	TUS Midwest
	B Seymour 0-11 (9f, 1’65); E Fitzpatrick 0-3; R Maher, K O’Kelly, S Taylor and R Mounsey 0-2 each; A Mulcahy and K McCarthy 0-1 each.	Report	N Potterton 0-5 (3f, 1’65); E Dunne 0-4 (1 sideline); T Douglas 0-3 (1f); B Kenny, D Jordan, D Egerton and C Browne 0-1 each.

3 February 2022 Round 3	TU Dublin	1-14 - 5-25	University of Limerick	TU Dublin Grangegorman
	N Potterton 0-6, M Rock 1-0, T Douglas 0-2, E Dunne 0-2, P Christie 0-1, P Maher 0-1, D Egerton 0-1, C Quirke 0-1.	Report	G O'Connor 0-9, B Power 2-2, M Kiely 1-3, M Rodgers 1-1, G Connolly 0-4, B O'Sullivan 1-0, B O'Mara 0-2, S Twomey 0-1, C O'Grady 0-1, C Flaherty 0-1, B O'Grady 0-1.

== Knockout stage ==
=== Quarter-finals ===
8 February 2022 Quarter-final	IT Carlow	1-17 - 0-14	University College Cork	IT Carlow
	S Casey 0-7 (0-4 f, 0-1 65), R Higgins 1-1, C Nolan 0-3, T Keyes, N Brassil, C Kenny, E Gaughan, C Dunbar, M Kavanagh (65) 0-1 each.	Report	M Kehoe, S Barrett (f) 0-4 each, C Boylan, D Connery (f) 0-2 each, R Downey, W Henn (f) 0-1 each.	Referee: T Walsh (Waterford)

8 February 2022 Quarter-final	University of Limerick	2-22 - 1-19	MTU Cork	University of Limerick Grounds
	G O’Connor 0-8 (0-4 f), N Brennan 0-5, M Kiely 1-2, M Rodgers 1-1, B Power, C Connolly, R Hayes, B O’Grady, K Sampson, C O’Flaherty 0-1 each.	Report	L O’Shea 0-9 (0-6 f), D Hanlon 1-1, T Howard 0-3, A Walsh 0-2, B Twomey, B Kehoe, A O’Connell, P Creedon 0-1 each.	Referee: L Gordon (Galway)

9 February 2022 Quarter-final	NUI Galway	1-22 - 2-13	Waterford IT	Dangan Sports Grounds
	E Niland 0-14 (0-12f), C Lynch 0-3, F MacDonagh 1-0, C Killeen 0-2, M Gill 0-1, J Fleming 0-1, M Kennedy 0-1.	Report	S Bennett 2-2 (2-0 pens), E O’Shea 0-7 (0-6f, 0-1 65), B Nolan 0-2f, C Kirwan 0-1, P Fitzgerald 0-1.	Referee: R McGann (Clare)

9 February 2022 Quarter-final	Galway-Mayo Institute of Technology	1-19 - 1-12	TUS Midwest	Carnmore Hurling Club
	K Cooney (0-11, seven frees), AJ Willis (1-1), C Gardiner (0-3), S McDonagh (0-2), P Commins (0-2).	Report	B Seymour (1-4, three frees), E Fitzpatrick (0-2); R Mounsey (0-2, one sideline), K McCarthy (0-2), K O’Kelly (0-1), R Bonnar (0-1).	Referee: F Horgan (Tipperary)

=== Semi-finals ===
16 February 2022 Semi-final	NUI Galway	1-26 - 3-18 (aet)	Galway-Mayo Institute of Technology	Pearse Stadium
	E Niland 0-16 (11f), J Fleming 1-2, M Kennedy 0-2, C Lynch 0-2, F McDonagh 0-2, J Fitzpatrick 0-1, O Flannery 0-1.	Report	K Cooney 1-10 (0-10f), E Egan 1-0, J Forde 1-0, C Gardiner 0-2, L Prendergast 0-1, S McDonagh 0-1, AJ Willis 0-1, P Commins 0-1, C Fahy 0-1, A Clarke 0-1.	Referee: L Gordon (Galway)

17 February 2022 Semi-final	IT Carlow	2-23 - 1-27	University of Limerick
	S Casey 1-11 (0-11f), R Higgins 0-5, C Nolan 0-4, M Kavanagh 1-0, C Dunbar 0-2, C Kenny 0-1.	Report	M Rodgers 0-6 (0-4f, 0-1 ’65), M Kiely 1-3 (1-of), N Brennan 0-4, C Galvin 0-3, B O’Grady 0-3, G O’Connor 0-3 (0-3f), C Flaherty 0-2, C Connolly 0-1, B O’Mara 0-1 (0-1f).	Referee: J Keenan (Wicklow)

=== Final ===
19 February 2022 Final	NUI Galway	2-15 - 1-21	University of Limerick	IT Carlow
	E Niland [0-14, 12f], J Fleming [1-1], M Kennedy [1-0].	Report	G O’Connor [0-9, 8f], B O’Mara [0-4], M Kiely [1-2], C Connolly [0-3], R Hayes [0-1], B O’Sullivan [0-1], B O’Grady [0-1].

== Statistics ==
=== Top scorers ===
Overall

Rank	Player	Club	Tally	Total	Matches	Average
1	Evan Niland	NUI Galway	0-79	79	6	13.16
2	Kevin Cooney	GMIT	2-38	44	4	11.00
3	Gearóid O'Connor	University of Limerick	1-36	39	5	7.80
4	Martin Kavanagh	IT Carlow	3-28	37	5	7.40
5	Eoin O'Shea	Waterford IT	1-30	33	4	8.25
6	Devon Ryan	Mary Immaculate College	2-24	30	3	10.00
7	Donal O'Shea	UCD	0-29	29	3	9.66
7	Liam O'Shea	MTU Cork	0-29	29	3	9.66
9	Michael Kiely	University of Limerick	4-16	28	5	5.60
10	Mark Rodgers	University of Limerick	5-09	24	4	6.00
10	Billy Seymour	TUS Midwest	1-21	24	3	8.00

In a single game

Rank	Player	Club	Tally	Total	Opposition
1	Evan Niland	GMIT	0-16	16	GMIT
2	Séamus Casey	IT Carlow	1-11	14	University of Limerick
2	Evan Niland	GMIT	0-14	14	University of Limerick
2	Evan Niland	NUI Galway	0-14	14	Waterford IT
5	Devon Ryan	Mary Immaculate College	2-07	13	UCD
5	Kevin Cooney	GMIT	1-10	13	NUI Galway
5	Martin Kavanagh	IT Carlow	0-13	13	Waterford IT
5	Kevin Cooney	GMIT	0-13	13	Waterford IT
5	Evan Niland	NUI Galway	0-13	13	UCC
10	Evan Niland	NUI Galway	0-12	12	UCD

== Awards ==
Team of the Year

1. Darach Fahy
2. Podge Delaney
3. T. J. Brennan
4. Jack Fitzpatrick
5. Cianan Fahy
6. Bryan O'Mara
7. Niall Brassil
8. Ciarán Connolly
9. Fionán Mackessy
10. Cian Lynch
11. Gearóid O'Connor
12. John Fleming
13. Mikey Kiely
14. Mark Rodgers
15. Evan Niland
