= Jack Fitzpatrick (hurler) =

Irish hurler

Personal information
- Native name: Seán Mac Giolla Pádraig (Irish)
- Born: 1998 (age 27–28) Killimordaly, County Galway, Ireland
- Occupation: Student

Sport
- Sport: Hurling
- Position: Full-back
Club
- Years: Club
- Killimordaly
Club titles
- Galway titles: 0
College
- Years: College
- NUI Galway
College titles
- Fitzgibbon titles: 0
Inter-county*
Years	County	Apps (scores)
2018-present	Galway	0 (0-00)
Inter-county titles
- Leinster titles: 0
- All-Irelands: 0
- NHL: 1
- All Stars: 0
- *Inter County team apps and scores correct as of 12:49, 14 November 2020.

Jack Fitzpatrick (born 1998) is an Irish hurler who plays for Galway Senior Championship club Killimordaly and at inter-county level with the Galway senior hurling team. He usually lines out as a full-back.

== Honours ==
Galway

- National Hurling League (1): 2021
- Leinster Under-21 Hurling Championship (1): 2018
- All-Ireland Minor Hurling Championship (1): 2015

Sporting positions
Preceded by Seán Loftus	Galway minor hurling team captain 2016	Succeeded by Darren Morrissey
