= Brian Concannon (hurler) =

Irish hurler (born 1997)

Personal information
- Native name: Brian Ó Concheannainn (Irish)
- Born: 1997 (age 28–29) Ballinasloe, County Galway, Ireland
- Occupation: Student
- Height: 6 ft 2 in (188 cm)

Sport
- Sport: Hurling
- Position: Right corner-forward
Club
Years	Club	Apps (scores)
2014-present	Killimordaly	36 (9-76)
Club titles
- Galway titles: 0
College
- Years: College
- NUI Galway
College titles
- Fitzgibbon titles: 0
Inter-county*
Years	County	Apps (scores)
2018-present	Galway	12 (5-14)
Inter-county titles
- Leinster titles: 2
- All-Irelands: 0
- NHL: 1
- All Stars: 0
- *Inter County team apps and scores correct as of 23:47, 11 June 2021.

Brian Concannon (born 1997) is an Irish hurler who plays as a right corner-forward for club side Killimordaly and at inter-county level with the Galway senior hurling team. He usually lines out as a right corner-forward.

== Playing career ==
=== NUI Galway ===
As a student at NUI Galway, Concannon has been a regular player on the university's senior hurling team in the Fitzgibbon Cup.

=== Killimordaly ===
Concannon joined the Killimordaly club at a young age and played in all grades at juvenile and underage levels before joining the club's senior team.

=== Galway ===
==== Minor and under-21 ====
Concannon first played for Galway as a member of the minor hurling team on 26 July 2015. He made his first appearance in a 1–14 to 0-13 All-Ireland quarter-final defeat of Limerick. On 6 September 2015, Concannon scored a goal from right wing-forward in Galway's 4–13 to 1–16 defeat of Tipperary in the All-Ireland final at Croke Park.

On 20 August 2016, Concannon made his first appearance for the Galway under-21 team in a 0–21 to 0-19 All-Ireland semi-final defeat of Dublin. In the subsequent All-Ireland final on 10 September 2016, he was an unused substitute in the 5–15 to 0–14 defeat by Waterford.

Concannon won a Leinster Championship medal on 4 July 2018 after a 4–21 to 2-26 extra-time defeat of Wexford in the final. In Concannon's last game in the grade on 8 August 2018, he was red-carded in the 33rd minute for an off-the-ball strike.

==== Senior ====
Concannon was one of eight new players drafted onto the Galway senior hurling panel prior to the start of the 2018 National League. He made his senior debut, scoring 1-01 from play at right corner-forward, in a 1–19 to 1-16 National Hurling League defeat of Antrim on 28 January 2018. Later that season Concannon made his first appearance in the Leinster Championship, scoring 2-01 from play, in a 5–18 to 2–15 defeat of Offaly. On 8 July 2018, he was an unused substitute in Galway's 1–28 to 3-15 Leinster final replay defeat of Kilkenny at Semple Stadium. Concannon subsequently missed the All-Ireland final defeat by Limerick after having the red card he picked up in an under-21 game upheld after an appeal.

== Career statistics ==
As of match played 6 June 2021.

Team	Year	National League			Leinster		All-Ireland		Total	
Team	Year	Division	Apps	Score	Apps	Score	Apps	Score	Apps	Score
Galway	2018	Division 1B	6	1-02	4	2-02	0	0-00	10	3-04
Galway	2019	Division 1B	6	2-06	4	1-04	—		10	3-10
Galway	2020	Division 1A	4	1-08	2	1-05	2	1-03	8	4-16
Galway	2021	Division 1A	4	3-07	0	0-00	0	0-00	4	3-07
Total			20	7-23	10	4-11	2	1-03	32	12-37

== Honours ==
Galway

- Leinster Senior Hurling Championship (2): 2018 2026
- National Hurling League (1): 2021
- Leinster Under-21 Hurling Championship (1): 2018
- All-Ireland Minor Hurling Championship (1): 2015

== Individual ==
- Fitzgibbon Cup All Star: 2023
