= Michael Kiely =

Irish hurler

Personal information
- Native name: Mícheál Ó Cadhla (Irish)
- Born: 2001 (age 24–25) Abbeyside, County Waterford, Ireland
- Occupation: Teacher

Sport
- Sport: Hurling
- Position: Full-forward
Club
- Years: Club
- Abbeyside–Ballinacourty
Club titles
- Waterford titles: 0
College
Years	College	Apps (scores)
2020-2023	University of Limerick	10 (12-18)
College titles
- Fitzgibbon titles: 2
Inter-county*
Years	County	Apps (scores)
2021-present	Waterford	4 (0-03)
Inter-county titles
- Munster titles: 0
- All-Irelands: 0
- NHL: 0
- All Stars: 0
- *Inter County team apps and scores correct as of 22:26, 30 March 2022.

Michael Kiely (born 2001) is an Irish hurler who plays for Waterford SHC club Abbeyside and at inter-county level with the Waterford senior hurling team. He usually lines out as a forward.

== Career ==
Kiely played at juvenile and underage levels with Abbeyside before progressing onto the club's senior team. He was a member of the University of Limerick team that won the 2022 Fitzgibbon Cup. Kiely first appeared on the inter-county scene as a member of the Waterford minor hurling team before later lining out with the under-20 team. He was drafted onto the Waterford senior hurling team in 2021.

== Career statistics ==
As of 27 March 2022.

Team	Year	National League			Munster		All-Ireland		Total	
Team	Year	Division	Apps	Score	Apps	Score	Apps	Score	Apps	Score
Waterford	2021	Division 1A	4	0-02	0	0-00	4	0-03	8	0-05
Waterford	2022	Division 1B	6	1-04	0	0-00	0	0-00	6	1-04
Career total			10	1-06	0	0-00	4	0-03	14	1-09

== Honours ==
University of Limerick

- Fitzgibbon Cup: 2022, 2023
- 2017 Munster u16.5 E Hurling and Football Championships with Meánscoil San Nioclás, An Rinn.
