= Evan Niland =

Irish hurler (born 1998)

Personal information
- Native name: Eimhín Ó Nialláin (Irish)
- Born: 10 July 1998 (age 28) Clarinbridge, County Galway, Ireland
- Occupation: Secondary School Teacher
- Height: 1.73m (5ft 8in)

Sport
- Sport: Hurling
- Position: Corner-forward
Club*
Years	Club	Apps (scores)
2015-present	Clarinbridge	64 (6 - 647)
Club titles
- Galway titles: 0
College
Years	College	Apps (scores)
2017-2023	University of Galway	20 (1 - 225)
College titles
- Fitzgibbon titles: 0
Inter-county**
Years	County	Apps (scores)
2019-present	Galway	28 (1 - 124)
Inter-county titles
- Leinster titles: 1
- All-Irelands: 0
- NHL: 1
- All Stars: 0
- * club appearances and scores correct as of 22:28, 06 December 2025. **Inter County team apps and scores correct as of 21:42, 26 May 2026.

Evan Niland (born 10 July 1998) is an Irish hurler who plays for Galway Senior Championship club Clarinbridge and at inter-county level with the Galway senior hurling team. He usually lines out as a corner-forward. His brother Aaron also plays for both teams.

== Career ==
Niland first came to hurling prominence as a schoolboy with the Presentation College in Athenry, with whom he won three successive Connacht Colleges Championships. He simultaneously lined out with the Clarinbridge club at juvenile and underage levels and was part of the senior team that lost the 2021 Galway SHC final to St Thomas's. Niland first appeared on the inter-county scene as a member of the Galway minor hurling team that beat Tipperary in the 2015 All-Ireland minor hurling final. He later won a Leinster U21 Championship. Niland was drafted onto the Galway senior hurling team in 2019.

== Career statistics ==
=== Club ===
As of match played 6 December 2025.

Team	Year	Galway SHC	
Team	Year	Apps	Score
Clarinbridge	2015	4	0-39
Clarinbridge	2016	5	1-44
Clarinbridge	2017	9	0-70
Clarinbridge	2018	7	0-76
Clarinbridge	2019	6	1-58
Clarinbridge	2020	3	0-32
Clarinbridge	2021	7	0-75
Clarinbridge	2022	8	0-87
Clarinbridge	2023	5	1-54
Clarinbridge	2024	6	2-72
Clarinbridge	2025	4	1-43
Career total		64	6-647

=== Inter-county ===
As of match played 26 May 2025.

Team	Year	National League			Leinster		All-Ireland		Total	
Team	Year	Division	Apps	Score	Apps	Score	Apps	Score	Apps	Score
Galway Minor	2015	—			—		4	0-31	4	0-31
Galway Minor	2016	—			—		2	1-12	2	1-12
Galway Minor	Total	—			—		6	1-43	6	1-43
Galway U21	2017	—			—		1	0-01	1	0-01
Galway U21	2018	—			3	2-22	1	0-06	4	2-28
Galway U21	Total	—			3	2-22	2	0-07	5	2-29
Galway	2019	Division 1B	0	0-00	0	0-00	—		0	0-00
Galway	2020	Division 1A	3	0-18	1	0-00	2	0-02	6	0-20
Galway	2021	Division 1A	5	0-42	1	0-02	1	0-02	7	0-46
Galway	2022	Division 1A	3	1-07	5	1-03	2	0-02	10	2-12
Galway	2023	Division 1A	4	0-41	6	0-60	2	0-17	12	0-118
Galway	2024	Division 1B	5	0-40	5	0-32	—		10	0-72
Galway	2025	Division 1B	2	0-16	0	0-00	0	0-00	2	0-16
Galway	2026	Division 1A	1	0-01	2	0-06	0	0-00	3	0-07
Total			23	1-165	20	1-104	7	0-21	50	2-290
Career total			23	1-165	23	3-126	15	1-71	61	5-362

== Honours ==
Presentation College, Athenry

- Connacht Colleges Senior Hurling Championship: 2014, 2015, 2016

National University of Galway

- Fitzgibbon Cup Runners-up (2): 2022, 2023

Clarinbridge

- Galway Minor A Hurling Championship: 2015, 2016
- Galway Under-21 A Hurling Championship: 2018

Galway

- National Hurling League: 2021
- Leinster Senior Hurling Championship: 2026
- Leinster Under-21 Hurling Championship: 2018
- All-Ireland Minor Hurling Championship: 2015
- Walsh Cup: 2023, 2026

== Individual ==
- Fitzgibbon Cup All Star: 2019, 2022
- All-Ireland Minor Hurling Championship Final Man of the Match: 2015
- Fitzgibbon CupTop Scorer 2019, 2022, 2023
