= Dean Mason (hurler) =

Irish hurler

Personal information
- Native name: Dean Másún (Irish)
- Born: 3 October 2000 (age 26) Ballyhale, County Kilkenny, Ireland
- Height: 6 ft 0 in (183 cm)

Sport
- Sport: Hurling
- Position: Goalkeeper
Club
- Years: Club
- 2018-present: Ballyhale Shamrocks
Club titles
- Kilkenny titles: 5
- Leinster titles: 4
- All-Ireland Titles: 3
College
- Years: College
- University of Limerick
College titles
- Fitzgibbon titles: 2
Inter-county
- Years: County
- 2022-present: Kilkenny
Inter-county titles
- Leinster titles: 2
- All-Irelands: 0
- NHL: 0
- All Stars: 0

Dean Mason (born 3 October 2000) is an Irish hurler. At club level he plays as a goalkeeper with Ballyhale Shamrocks and at inter-county level with the Kilkenny senior hurling team.

== Career ==
Mason had a number of hurling successes as a student at St Kieran's College in Kilkenny. He won two Leinster Colleges SHC titles, as well as consecutive Croke Cup titles in 2018 and 2019. Mason later lined out with University of Limerick and was part of their Fitzgibbon Cup-winning teams in 2022 and 2023.

At club level, Mason first played hurling at juvenile and underage levels with the Ballyhale Shamrocks club. He had several underage successes, including the Kilkenny MAHC title in 2016 and consecutive Kilkenny U21AHC titles in 2017 and 2018. Mason was just 17-years-old when he became the club's senior team goalkeeper. Over the course of the following few years, he won five consecutive Kilkenny SHC titles, four Leinster Club SHC titles and three All-Ireland Club SHC titles.

Mason was 16-years-old when he first played on the inter-county scene with Kilkenny as a member of the minor team. He won a Leinster MHC medal in 2017, however, a change in the age limit meant that this was his only year in that grade. Mason won a Leinster U2HC medal in 2019. He joined the senior team's extended panel as third-choice goalkeeper in 2022. Mason won consecutive Leinster SHC medals in 2022 and 2023.

== Personal life ==
His granduncle, Maurice Mason, also played for Ballyhale Shamrocks and captained Kilkenny in 1981.

== Honours ==
St Kieran's College

- Dr Croke Cup: 2018, 2019
- Leinster Colleges Senior Hurling Championship: 2017, 2019

University of Limerick

- Fitzgibbon Cup: 2022, 2023

Ballyhale Shamrocks

- All-Ireland Senior Club Hurling Championship: 2019, 2020, 2023
- Leinster Senior Club Hurling Championship: 2018, 2019, 2021, 2022
- Kilkenny Senior Hurling Championship: 2018, 2019, 2020, 2021, 2022
- Kilkenny Under-21 A Hurling Championship: 2017, 2018
- Kilkenny Minor Hurling Championship: 2016

Kilkenny

- Leinster Senior Hurling Championship: 2022, 2023
- Leinster Under-20 Hurling Championship: 2019
- Leinster Minor Hurling Championship: 2017
