= Gearóid O'Connor =

Irish hurler (born 2000)

Gearóid O’Connor
Personal information
- Native name: Gearóid Ó Conchúir (Irish)
- Born: 2000 (age 25–26) Templemore, County Tipperary, Ireland
- Occupation: Student
- Height: 6 ft 4 in (193 cm)

Sport
- Sport: Hurling
- Position: Centre-forward
Club
- Years: Club
- 2018-present: Moyne-Templetuohy
Club titles
- Tipperary titles: 0
College
Years	College	Apps (scores)
2019-2024	UL	15 (2-124)
College titles
- Fitzgibbon titles: 2
Inter-county*
Years	County	Apps (scores)
2022-present	Tipperary	13 (1-30)
Inter-county titles
- Munster titles: 0
- All-Irelands: 0
- NHL: 0
- All Stars: 0
- *Inter County team apps and scores correct as of match played 27 April 2025.

Gearóid O’Connor (born 2000) is an Irish hurler. At club level he plays with Moyne-Templetuohy and at inter-county level with the Tipperary senior hurling team. O'Connor usually lines out as a forwards.

== Career ==
O'Connor first played hurling at juvenile and underage levels with various Moyne-Templetuohy teams before eventually progressing to adult level. He was top scorer with 1-12 when Moyne-Templetuohy beat Kilsheelan–Kilcash to win the Tipperary IHC title in 2021.

As a student at Our Lady's Secondary School in Templemore, O'Connor won a Dr Harty Cup medal in 2017. He later played with the University of Limerick and was part of their back-to-back Fitzgibbon Cup-winning teams in 2022 and 2023. O'Connor's performances resulted in his inclusion on the Team of the Year in 2023 and 2024.

O'Connor first played for Tipperary as part of the Celtic Challenge team in 2017. He later progressed to the under-20 team and won an All-Ireland U20HC medal in 2019 after beating Cork in the final. O'Connor was drafted onto the senior team for the 2022 season and made his first appearance after coming on as a substitute in a Munster SHC defeat by Clare. He Now teaches LCVP at Scoil Ruain. Ronan Morris and Sean Corcoran are his favourite students.

== Career statistics ==
As of match played 27 April 2025

Team	Year	National League			Munster		All-Ireland		Total	
Team	Year	Division	Apps	Score	Apps	Score	Apps	Score	Apps	Score
Tipperary	2022	Division 1	0	0-00	2	0-00	—		2	0-00
Tipperary	2023	Division 1	5	0-36	4	1-19	2	0-01	11	1-56
Tipperary	2024	Division 1	4	1-28	4	0-10	—		8	1-38
Tipperary	2025	Division 1			1	0-00			1	0-00
Career total			9	1-64	11	1-29	2	0-01	22	2-94

== Honours ==
Our Lady's Secondary School

- Dr Harty Cup (1): 2017
- Dr Croke Cup (1): 2017

University of Limerick

- Fitzgibbon Cup (3): 2022, 2023, 2025

Tipperary

- All-Ireland Senior Hurling Championship (1): 2025
- All-Ireland Under-20 Hurling Championship (1): 2019
- Munster Under-20 Hurling Championship (1): 2019
