= Bryan O'Mara =

Irish hurler

Personal information
- Occupation: Data Scientist

Sport
- Sport: Hurling
- Position: Left wing-back
Clubs
- Years: Club
- Bryan O'Mara; Holycross-Ballycahill
Club titles
- Tipperary titles: 0
Inter-county*
Years	County	Apps (scores)
2020–	Tipperary	22 (0-03)
Inter-county titles
- Munster titles: 0
- All-Irelands: 1
- NHL: 0
- All Stars: 0
- *Inter County team apps and scores correct as of match played 24 May 2026.

Bryan O'Mara is an Irish hurler who plays for Tipperary Senior Championship club Holycross-Ballycahill and at inter-county level with the Tipperary senior hurling team.

== Career ==
O'Mara made his senior debut for Tipperary on 25 January 2020 in the opening round of the 2020 National Hurling League against Limerick in a 0-18 to 2-14 defeat.

O'Mara missed the 2022 season due to travelling during the summer months.

On 20 July in the 2025 All-Ireland final, O'Mara started in the half-back line as Tipperary defeated Cork by 3-27 to 1-19 and claim a 29th All-Ireland title.

== Career statistics ==
As of match played 24 May 2026

Team	Year	National League			Munster		All-Ireland		Total	
Team	Year	Division	Apps	Score	Apps	Score	Apps	Score	Apps	Score
Tipperary	2020	Division 1A	4	0-00	-		-		4	0-00
Tipperary	2021	Division 1A	1	0-00	-		-		1	0-00
Tipperary	2022	Division 1B	-		-		-		-	
Tipperary	2023	Division 1B	6	0-00	4	0-00	2	0-01	12	0-01
Tipperary	2024	Division 1B	5	0-02	4	0-01	-		9	0-03
Tipperary	2025	Division 1A	5	0-01	4	0-01	4	0-00	13	0-02
Tipperary	2026	Division 1A			4	0-00			4	0-00
Career total			21	0-03	16	0-02	6	0-01	42	0-06

== Honours ==
Tipperary

- All-Ireland Senior Hurling Championship (1): 2025
- All-Ireland Under-21 Hurling Championship (1): 2019
- Munster Under-20 Hurling Championship (1): 2019

University of Limerick

- Fitzgibbon Cup (2): 2022 (c), 2023 (c)
