= P. J. Scully =

Irish hurler

Personal information
- Native name: P. S. Ó Scolaí (Irish)
- Born: 7 February 1994 (age 32) Borris-in-Ossory, County Laois, Ireland
- Occupation: Secondary school teacher
- Height: 6 ft 0 in (183 cm)

Sport
- Sport: Hurling
- Position: Right corner-forward
Club
- Years: Club
- Borris-in-Ossory/Kilcotton
Club titles
- Laois titles: 2
College
- Years: College
- University of Limerick
College titles
- Fitzgibbon titles: 1
Inter-county*
Years	County	Apps (scores)
2013-present	Laois	11 (1-19)
Inter-county titles
- Leinster titles: 0
- All-Irelands: 0
- NHL: 0
- All Stars: 0
- *Inter County team apps and scores correct as of 13:55, 8 July 2021.

P. J. Scully (born 7 February 1994) is an Irish hurler who plays for Laois Senior Championship club Borris-in-Ossory/Kilcotton and at inter-county level with the Laois senior hurling team. He currently lines out as a corner-forward

== Career ==
Scully first came to prominence as a member of the Borris-in-Ossory/Kilcotton club at juvenile and underage levels. He eventually joined the club's senior team and has since won County Championship titles in 2016 and 2020. He simultaneously played with the University of Limerick and was part of their successful 2015 Fitzgibbon Cup-winning team. Scully made his first appearances at inter-county level during a two-year stint with the Laois minor team, before a three-year tenure with the Laois under-21 team. He joined the Laois senior hurling team in 2013, ending the year with a National Hurling League Division 2A title. Scully left the Laois panel midway during the 2019 season, a decision which resulted in him missing the team's Joe McDonagh Cup triumph, however, he returned at the start of the 2021 season.

== Career statistics ==
As of match played 24 July 2021.

Team	Year	National League			McDonagh Cup		Leinster		All-Ireland		Total	
Team	Year	Division	Apps	Score	Apps	Score	Apps	Score	Apps	Score	Apps	Score
Laois	2013	Division 2A	4	0-02	—		1	0-00	1	0-02	6	0-04
Laois	2014	Division 1B	6	0-02	—		1	0-01	0	0-00	7	0-03
Laois	2015	Division 1B	6	0-11	—		4	0-04	1	0-00	11	0-15
Laois	2016	Division 1B	7	2-47	—		1	1-03	1	0-01	9	3-51
Laois	2017	Division 1B	1	0-01	—		0	0-00	0	0-00	1	0-01
Laois	2018	Division 1B	2	0-06	2	0-01	—		—		4	0-07
Laois	2019	Division 1B	3	0-07	0	0-00	—		0	0-00	3	0-07
Laois	2020	Division 1B	—		—		—		—		—	
Laois	2021	Division 1B	6	1-53	—		1	0-08	2	0-19	9	1-80
Career total			35	3-129	2	0-01	8	1-16	5	0-22	50	4-168

== Honours ==
University of Limerick

- Fitzgibbon Cup: 2015

Borris-in-Ossory/Kilcotton

- Laois Senior Hurling Championship: 2016, 2020

Laois

- National Hurling League Division 2A: 2013
