= Kevin Cooney (hurler) =

Irish hurler (born 1998)

Personal information
- Native name: Caoimhín Ó Cuana (Irish)
- Born: 1998 (age 27–28) Bullaun, County Galway, Ireland

Sport
- Sport: Hurling
- Position: Left corner-forward
Club
- Years: Club
- Sarsfields
Club titles
- Galway titles: 1
Inter-county*
| Years | County | Apps (scores) |
| 2019-present | Galway | 0 (0-00) |
Inter-county titles
- Leinster titles: 0
- All-Irelands: 0
- NHL: 1
- All Stars: 0
- *Inter County team apps and scores correct as of 16:45, 12 July 2021.

Kevin Cooney (born 1998) is an Irish hurler who plays for Galway Senior Championship club Sarsfields and at inter-county level with the Galway senior hurling team. He usually lines out as a forward.

== Career ==
A member of the Sarsfields club, Cooney first came to prominence as a member of the club's 2015 County Championship-winning team. He first appeared at inter-county level as a member of the Galway minor team during the 2016 All-Ireland Minor Championship before winning a Leinster Championship title with the under-20 team in 2018. Cooney made his senior debut as part of Galway's 2019 Walsh Cup-winning team.

== Career statistics ==
As of match played 3 July 2021.

| Team | Year | National League | | | Leinster | | All-Ireland | | Total | |
| Team | Year | Division | Apps | Score | Apps | Score | Apps | Score | Apps | Score |
|---|---|---|---|---|---|---|---|---|---|---|
| Galway | 2019 | Division 1B | 2 | 0-00 | 0 | 0-00 | — | | 2 | 0-00 |
| Galway | 2020 | Division 1A | 1 | 0-00 | 0 | 0-00 | 0 | 0-00 | 1 | 0-00 |
| Galway | 2021 | Division 1A | 3 | 0-01 | 0 | 0-00 | 0 | 0-00 | 3 | 0-01 |
| Total | | | 6 | 0-01 | 0 | 0-00 | 0 | 0-00 | 67 | 0-01 |

== Honours ==
Sarsfields

- Galway Senior Hurling Championship: 2015

Galway

- National Hurling League: 2021
- Walsh Cup: 2019
