= T. J. Brennan (hurler) =

Irish hurler

Personal information
- Native name: T. S. Ó Braonáin (Irish)
- Born: 2000 (age 25–26) Clarinbridge, County Galway, Ireland
- Occupation: Secondary School Teacher

Sport
- Sport: Hurling
- Position: Centre-back
Club
- Years: Club
- Clarinbridge
Club titles
- Galway titles: 0
Inter-county*
Years	County	Apps (scores)
2019-	Galway	0 (0-00)
Inter-county titles
- Leinster titles: 0
- All-Irelands: 0
- NHL: 1
- All Stars: 0
- *Inter County team apps and scores correct as of 12:49, 14 November 2020.

T. J. Brennan (born 2000) is an Irish hurler who plays for Galway Senior Championship club Clarinbridge and at inter-county level with the Galway senior hurling team. He usually lines out as a centre-back.

== Honours ==
Galway

- National Hurling League (1): 2021
- All-Ireland Minor Hurling Championship (1): 2017
