= Jeffrey Lynskey =

Irish hurler and manager

Jeffrey Lynskey (born 1977) is an Irish hurling manager and former player who was the current manager of the Galway minor hurling team and also works as an English and history teacher in Galway Community College.

== Playing career ==
=== College ===
Lynskey first came to prominence as a hurler with St. Mary's College in Galway. Having played in every grade as a hurler, he was centre-back on the college's senior hurling team that won the Connacht Championship in 1994. Lynskey was later in the same position when the North Monastery defeated St. Mary's College by 1-10 to 1-06 in the All-Ireland final.

=== University ===
During his studies at NUI Galway, Lynskey was a regular on the college's senior hurling team that played in the Fitzgibbon Cup.

=== Club ===
Lynskey joined the Liam Mellows club at a young age and played in all grades at juvenile and underage levels. His championship career with the club's senior team lasted twenty seasons before his retirement in 2014.

=== Inter-county ===
==== Minor and under-21 ====
Lynskey first came to prominence as a hurler with Galway in 1994 when he was added to the Galway minor hurling panel. On 9 September 1994, he was an unused substitute when Galway defeated Cork by 2-10 to 1-11 in the All-Ireland final at Croke Park.

Eligible for the minor grade again the following year, Lynskey made his first appearance on 12 August 1995 in a 2-08 to 0-12 All-Ireland semi-final defeat by Cork. It was his last game in the minor grade.

Lynskey immediately made the step up to the Galway under-21 team in 1996, however, his season came to a premature end after breaking his leg. After rejoining the panel the following year, he was an unused substitute when Galway were defeated by Cork in the All-Ireland final on 21 September 1997.

On 29 August 1998, Lynskey made his first appearance for the Galway under-21 team in a 4-18 to 3-07 defeat of Kilkenny in the All-Ireland semi-final. He was later at left wing-back for Galway's second successive All-Ireland final defeat by Cork.

== Management and coaching career ==
=== St. Mary's College ===
Lynskey first became involved in coaching as a secondary school student at St. Mary's College. During a year in which he repeated his Leaving Certificate, he started coaching the school's senior team because he was overage.

=== Liam Mellows ===
Lynskey began his coaching career at club level with the various Liam Mellows juvenile teams at under-14, under-16 and under-16 levels. He subsequently became involved with the minor and under-21 teams before serving as player-manager with the Liam Mellows senior team on a number of occasions.

=== Mayo ===
In June 2012, Lynskey was appointed as Hurling Mentor for Mayo as part of the National Hurling Development Plan. The initiative saw leading coaching people from the Liam MacCarthy Cup counties being appointed to facilitate the growth of hurling in their respective adopted counties and report to Croke Park on the developments and needs of the hurling community within Mayo.

=== Galway ===
After being involved with the Galway academy system and various underage development squads, Lynskey was recommended for the position of manager of the Galway minor hurling team in October 2014. In his first season in charge, he guided Galway to defeats of Limerick and Kilkenny on the way to qualifying for an All-Ireland final appearance on 6 September 2015. A 4-13 to 1-16 defeat of Tipperary secured the title for Lynskey's side.

Lynskey's minor side surrendered their All-Ireland title the following year, however, he guided the team back to another All-Ireland title on 3 September 2017 after a two-point defeat of Cork in the final.

On 19 August 2018, Lynskey won a third All-Ireland title as manager when Galway defeated Kilkenny by 0-21 to 0-14 in the All-Ireland final. Lynskey went on to become galway under 21 manager for 3 seasons after an 11 point loss to cork in the under 20 AI final he stepped down as manager

== Honours ==
=== As a player ===
Galway

- All-Ireland Minor Hurling Championship (1): 1994

=== In management ===
Galway

- All-Ireland Minor Hurling Championship (3): 2015, 2017, 2018

Sporting positions
Preceded by Mattie Murphy	Galway Minor Hurling Manager; 2014-2018	Succeeded by Brian Hanley
Preceded by Tony Ward	Galway Under-20 Hurling Manager; 2018-2021	Succeeded by Vacant
Achievements
Preceded by Pat Hoban	All-Ireland Minor Hurling Final winning manager 2015	Succeeded by Liam Cahill
Preceded by Liam Cahill	All-Ireland Minor Hurling Final winning manager 2017-2018	Succeeded by Brian Hanley
