= 2015 All-Ireland Minor Hurling Championship =

All-Ireland Minor Hurling Championship 2015
Championship Details
- Dates: 8 April 2015 - 6 September 2015

All Ireland Champions
- Winners: Galway (10th win)
- Captain: Seán Loftus
- Manager: Jeffrey Lynskey

All Ireland Runners-up
- Runners-up: Tipperary
- Captain: Stephen Quirke
- Manager: Liam Cahill

Provincial Champions
- Munster: Tipperary
- Leinster: Kilkenny
- Ulster: Antrim
- Connacht: Not Played

Championship Statistics
- Top Scorer: Andrew Gaffney (1-38)

The 2015 All-Ireland Minor Hurling Championship was the 85th staging of the All-Ireland hurling championship for players under the age of eighteen since its establishment by the Gaelic Athletic Association in 1928. The championship began on 8 April 2014 and ended on 6 September 2014.

Kilkenny were the defending champions.

Galway won the title after a 4–13 to 1–16 win against Tipperary in the final on 6 September.

Kilkenny's Andrew Gaffney was the championship's top scorer with 1-38.

== Results ==
=== Leinster Minor Hurling Championship ===
First round

11 April 2015 First round	Wexford	2-13 - 0-17	Laois	Innovate Wexford Park
15:00	S O'Gorman (2-0), C O'Connor (0-4f), M Dwyer (0-3), I Carty (0-3), J O'Connor (0-1), S Casey (0-1), D Codd (0-1).		M Kavanagh (0-5, 2f), S Dunphy (0-3), S Phelan (0-3), L O'Connell (0-2, 1f), L Cleere (0-1), J Geaney (0-1), M Phelan (0-1), A Dunphy (0-1).

11 April 2015 First round	Offaly	1-19 - 0-10	Carlow	O'Connor Park
18:00	C Molloy (0-9f), JP Cleary (1-2), L Langton (0-3), E Cahill (0-3), J Murray (0-2).	Report	K McDonald (0-6f), A Kane (0-2), C Nolan (0-2).

11 April 2015 First round	Wicklow	0-04 - 5-19	Westmeath	Centre of Excellence Ballinakill
15:00	E Donohoe (0-4, 3f).		K Doyle (2-9, 0-6f, 1'65), C Doyle (1-4), P Doody (2-0), J McCarthy (0-3), J Rabbitte (0-1), F Dowd (0-1), J Goonery (0-1).

11 April 2015 First round	Meath	5-11 - 1-11	Kildare	St. Loman's Park
15:00	P Slevin 4-1, J Cox 0-9 (7fs), P Farrell 1-0 (f), E Devine 0-1.	Report	J Sheridan 0-7 (6fs, 1 65), N O'Sullivan 1-0 og, C Foley 0-2 (1f), A Maher, B McCormack 0-1 each.

Second round

25 April 2015 Second round	Wexford	1-17 - 1-18 (aet)	Kilkenny	Innovate Wexford Park
14:00	S Casey 1-1; C O'Connor 0-10, 7f, 1, 65; R White, D Codd 0-2 each; I Carty, J O'Connor 0-1 each.	Report	D O'Connor 1-3; A Gaffney 0-11, 10f, 0-1, 65; J Donnelly 0-2; R Leahy, N Walsh 0-1 each.

25 April 2015 Second round	Dublin	2-17 - 0-13	Offaly	Parnell Park
14:30	E Dunne 1-2, M Oliver 0-5 (0-3f, 0-1 ’65), G King 1-1 (0-1 sideline), F Whitely 0-3, M Maguire 0-2, C Brady, C Burke (0-1f), C Dowling, C Sammon 0-1 apiece.	Report	C Molloy 0-6 (0-5f), L Langton 0-3, C Cleary, JP Cleary, O Kelly, E Cahill 0-1 each.

25 April 2015 Second round	Meath	0-05 - 7-26	Laois	St. Loman's Park
15:00	C Kearney (fs), J Cox (fs) 0-2 each; R Byrne 0-1.	Report	M Kavanagh 2-3; A Mortimer 2-0; A Bergin 0-6 (3fs); L O'Connell 0-4; S Phelan, R McEvoy 1-1 eacb; E Lyons 1-0; S Dunphy 0-3; A Dunphy, S Downey, M Phelan, 0-2 each; E Kileen, R Phelan 0-1 each.

25 April 2015 Second round	Carlow	1-14 - 3-10	Westmeath	Netwatch Cullen Park
15:00	K McDonald 0-8 (6f, 2 '65s), C Nolan 0-3 (2f), A Kane 1-0, D Grennan, S Brennan, L Galway 0-1 each.	Report	K Doyle 0-7 (6f), P Doody 1-2, C Doyle 1-1 (1-0 pen, 1f), N Mitchell 1-0.

Quarter-finals

9 May 2015 Quarter-final	Laois	3-15 - 1-13	Offaly	O'Moore Park
15:00	M Kavanagh 1-7 (0-6f), R Phelan 1-2, S Phelan 1-0, S Dunphy, A Bergin, A Dunphy, L O’Connell (f), A Mortimer and L Cleere 0-1 each.	Report	C Molloy 0-6f, E Cahill 1-3, L Langton 0-2, C Cleary and JP Cleary 0-1 each.

9 May 2015 Quarter-final	Wexford	0-15 - 2-11	Westmeath	Innovate Wexford Park
15:00	J O'Connor (4f) 0-6, C O'Connor 0-5 frees, J Pettitt 0-3, S O'Gorman 0-1.	Report	K Doyle (1f) 1-4, C Doyle 0-7 frees; P Doody 1-0.	Referee: M Flynn (Kilkenny)

Semi-finals

20 June 2015 Semi-final	Westmeath	1-08 - 1-17	Dublin	Cusack Park
15:00	N Mitchell (1-1, 0-1 free), C Doyle (0-4, frees), K Doyle (0-2), J Goonery (0-1).	Report	D Burke (1-5, 0-4 frees), M Oliver (0-4, frees), M Maguire (0-3), C Burke (0-1), E Conroy (0-1), C Ryan (0-1), E Dunne (0-1), A Mellett (0-1).	Referee: M O'Sulivan (Kilkenny)

21 June 2015 Semi-final	Kilkenny	2-18 - 0-11	Laois	Nowlan Park
12:00	A. Gaffney (1-6, 3 frees, 2 ‘65’); J. Donnelly (1-2); J. Cuddihy, N. Walsh (0-2 each); R. Leahy (0-2, 1 free); M.Cody, D. Joyce, D. O’Connor, T. O’Dwyer (0-1 each).	Report	M. Kavanagh (0-8, 5 frees, 5 ‘65’); A. Dunphy, A. Bergin, S. Phelan (0-1 each).	Referee: A Devine (Westmeath)

Final

5 July 2015 Final	Dublin	1-15 - 1-17	Kilkenny	Croke Park
14:00	M Oliver (0-10, nine frees, one 65), A Considine (1-1), E Conroy (0-2), D Burke (0-1), F Whitely (0-1).	Report	A Gaffney (0-5, five frees), R Leahy (0-4, two frees), T O’Dwyer (1-0), J Donnelly (0-2), E Delaney (0-2), J Cuddihy (0-1), J Connolly (0-1), D O’Connor (0-1), C Hennessy (0-1).	Referee: M Murtagh (Westmeath)

=== Munster Minor Hurling Championship ===
Quarter-finals

8 April 2015 Quarter-final	Tipperary	1-14 - 0-16	Waterford	Semple Stadium
	D Carey 0-8f, R Mulrooney 1-0, B McGrath 0-3 (2 65s, 1f), L Fairbrother 0-2, L McCutcheon 0-1	Report	J Prendergast 0-6f, A O’Sullivan 0-4, C Lyons 0-2, D Lyons (f), E Meaney, G Waters & E Murray 0-1 each	Referee: J Murphy (Limerick)

8 April 2015 Quarter-final	Cork	2-20 - 1-13	Limerick	Páirc Uí Rinn
	S Kingston (1-9, 0-4 frees); T O’Mahony (1-3); D Dalton (0-1 ’65, 0-1 free), M O’Halloran, J Looney (0-2 each); B Dunne, C Cormack (0-1 each)	Report	S Flanagan (1-4, 0-4 frees); B Murphy (0-5); P Casey (0-2); W O’Meara, K Hayes (0-1 each)	Attendance: 3,222; Referee: R McGann (Clare)

Playoff

6 May 2015 Playoff	Limerick	0-18 - 1-10	Waterford	Semple Stadium
	P Casey 0-6 (4f), E McNamara 0-5 (3 65s, 2f), B Ryan 0-2, W O’Meara, K Hayes, S Flanagan, B Murphy & D Carroll 0-1 each.	Report	A O’Sullivan 1-1, J Prendergast 0-3 (2f), A Molumby 0-2, B Nolan (f) C Lyons, G Waters & P Hogan 0-1 each.	Referee: P Kelly (Tipperary)

Semi-finals

25 June 2015 Semi-final	Tipperary	1-15 - 1-11	Clare	Semple Stadium
19:30	L Fairbrother (0-5, four frees), T Nolan (1-1), D Gleeson (0-4), D Carey (0-2), G Ryan (0-1), A Tynan (0-1), M Connors (0-1).	Report	A Shanagher (0-5, four frees, one 65), M Daly (1-0), J Cunningham (0-2), C Fitzgerald (0-2, one free, one sideline ball), A Kennedy (0-2).	Referee: J Larkin (Cork)

2 July 2015 Semi-final	Limerick	1-14 - 0-14	Cork	Gaelic Grounds
19:30	P Casey (1-6, four frees), D Carroll, T Grimes and K Hayes (0-2 each), E McNamara (free) and B Ryan (0-1 each).	Report	M Coleman (0-6, four frees), L Healy and D Fitzgibbon (0-2 each), T O’Mahony, C Cormack, D Dalton (65m), S Powter and (0-1 each).	Referee: P Foley (Waterford)

Final

12 July 2015 Final	Tipperary	0-20 - 0-17	Limerick	Semple Stadium
14:00	L Fairbrother (0-7, 0-4 frees); T Nolan (0-3); L McCutheon, G Ryan, A Tynan (0-2 each); D Gleeson, D Carey, S Neville, C Darcy (0-1 each).	Report	P Casey (0-13, 0-10 frees); M Mackey (0-2); S Flanagan, B Murphy, (0-1 each).

=== Ulster Minor Hurling Championship ===
Quarter-final

30 May 2015 Quarter-final	Derry	6-18 - 2-05	Donegal	Owenbeg
		Report

Semi-finals

28 June 2015 Semi-final	Armagh	1-05 - 4-16	Derry	Owenbeg
12:00	P McNaughton (1-0), J Murtagh (0-4, 0-1pen, 0-1f, 0-1 65'), C Rafferty (0-1)	Report	C O'Reilly (1-10, 0-4f), C Steele (2-0), O McKeever (1-1), D Cartin (0-4), J Mullan (0-1).	Referee: C Cunning (Antrim)

28 June 2015 Semi-final	Down	1-08 - 4-18	Antrim	Owenbeg
14:00

Final

12 July 2015 Final	Derry	1-09 - 2-21	Antrim	Owenbeg
	K Feeney (1-2), C O'Reilly (0-5, 3f), D Cartin (0-1), J Mullan (0-1).	Report	C McNaughton (1-9, 1-6f), C Patterson (1-0), D McShane (0-3), G Walsh (0-2, 1f), K Molloy (0-2), C Doherty Cunning (0-2), R McKee (0-2), C Leech (0-1).

=== All-Ireland Minor Hurling Championship ===
Quarter-finals

25 July 2015 Quarter-final	Dublin	2-22 - 2-11	Antrim	Kingspan Breffni Park
	M Oliver (0-11, 10f), F Whitely (1-2), E Conroy (1-0), M Maguire (0-3), C Sammon (0-2), D Gray (0-1), E Foley (0-1), A Considine (0-1), G King (0-1).	Report	C McNaughton (1-5, 5f), C Small (1-0), K Malloy (0-2), G Walsh (0-1, f), C Doherty-Cunning (0-1), D McLaughlin (0-1), R McKee (0-1).

26 July 2015 Quarter-final	Galway	1-14 - 0-13	Limerick	Semple Stadium
12:00	E Niland 0-9 (6frees, 2 ‘65), J Grealish 1-0, B Concannon, F Burke, T Monaghan, M Lynch, C Fahy 0-1 each.	Report	P Casey 0-5 (3frees), C Magner Flynn, E McNamara (1free, 1 ‘65) 0-2 each, K Hayes, M Mackey, B Murphy, O O’Reilly 0-1 each.	Referee: T Carroll (Offaly)

Semi-finals

9 August 2015 Semi-final	Kilkenny	0-26 - 2-20 (AET)	Galway	Croke Park
13:30	A Gaffney (0-10, 8 frees, 1 ‘65’); R Leahy (0-4); C Hennessy (0-3); J Donnelly (0-2); M Cody, C Doheny, J Connolly, D O’Connor, S Mahony, J Cuddihy and B Sheehan (all 0-1).	Report	E Niland (0-8, 6 frees, 1 ‘65’); T Monaghan (1-3); C Salmon (1-0); B Concannon (0-2); C Connor, J Grealish, F Burke, M Lynch, S Loftus, C Fahy and L Forde (all 0-1).	Referee: J O'Brien (Tipperary)

16 August 2015 Semi-final replay	Kilkenny	0-17 - 3-10	Galway	Croke Park
	A Gaffney (0-6, 3 frees, 2’65s’); J Connolly, C Hennessy (0-2 each); S Mahony, D O’Connor, M Cody, R Leahy, T O’Dwyer, E Delaney, J Donnelly (0-1 each).	Report	J Coyne (1-2); E Niland (0-5 frees); J Kenny (1-0); C Salmon (1-0); M Lynch, I O’Brien, T Monaghan (0-1 each)	Referee: C Lyons (Cork)

16 August 2015 Semi-final	Tipperary	2-17 - 1-15	Dublin	Croke Park
	T Nolan (1-3); L Fairbrother (0-7, 0-4 frees, 0-1 ’65); D Gleeson (1-0); R Mulrooney (0-2); D Carey, C Darcy, G Ryan, A Tynan, S Neville (0-1 each).	Report	M Oliver (0-10, 0-7 frees, 0-1 ’65); C Dowling (0-4); F Whitley (1-0); A Considine (0-1).

Final

6 September 2015 Final	Galway	4-13 - 1-16	Tipperary	Croke Park
	E Niland (0-9, 0-8f), C Fahy (1-0), M Lynch (1-0), B Concannon (1-0), L Forde (1-0), J Coyne (0-2), T Monaghan (0-1), S Loftus (0-1).	Report	T Nolan (1-2), L Fairbrother (0-5, 0-4f), C Darcy (0-2, 0-2f), S Quirke (0-2, 0-1 ‘sl), B McGrath (0-2, 0-1f, 0-1 ’65), D Peters (0-1, 0-1 ’65), A Tynan (0-1), M Connors (0-1).	Referee: P O'Dwyer (Carlow)

== Championship statistics ==
=== Scoring ===
- First goal of the championship: Séamus Flanagan for Limerick against Cork (Munster quarter-final, 8 April 2015)

=== Top scorers ===
Overall

Rank	Player	County	Tally	Total	Matches	Average
1	Andrew Gaffney	Kilkenny	1-38	41	5	8.20
2	Matthew Oliver	Dublin	0-40	40	5	8.00
3	Peter Casey	Limerick	1-32	35	5	7.00
4	Mark Kavanagh	Laois	3-23	32	4	8.00
5	Killian Doyle	Westmeath	3-22	31	4	7.75
5	Evan Niland	Galway	0-31	31	4	6.25

Single game

Rank	Player	Club	Tally	Total	Opposition
1	Killian Doyle	Westmeath	2-9	15	Wicklow
2	Peter Slevin	Meath	4-1	13	Kildare
2	Corey O'Reilly	Derry	1-10	13	Armagh
2	Peter Casey	Limerick	0-13	13	Tipperary
5	Shane Kingston	Cork	1-9	12	Limerick
6	Andrew Gaffney	Kilkenny	0-11	11	Wexford
6	Matthew Oliver	Dublin	0-11	10	Antrim
8	Mark Kavanagh	Laois	1-7	10	Offaly
8	Ciaran O'Connor	Wexford	0-10	10	Kilkenny
8	Matthew Oliver	Dublin	0-10	10	Kilkenny
8	Andrew Gaffney	Kilkenny	0-10	10	Galway
8	Matthew Oliver	Dublin	0-10	10	Tipperary
