= 2021 National Hurling League =

90th season of the National Hurling League

League details
- Dates: 8 May – 24 July 2021
- Teams: 32

League champions
- Winners: Galway / Kilkenny (11th and 19th win)
- Captain: Pádraic Mannion / Adrian Mullen
- Manager: Shane O'Neill / Brian Cody

Other division winners
- Division 2A: Offaly
- Division 2B: Kildare
- Division 3A: Sligo
- Division 3B: Louth

The 2021 National Hurling League was the 90th season of the National Hurling League for county teams. The English county teams (London, Warwickshire and Lancashire) did not compete due to the COVID-19 pandemic travel restrictions.

In February 2021 it was announced that the league would be delayed due to the impact of the COVID-19 pandemic on Gaelic games and that cancelling it would be a last resort. The league began on 8 May 2021.

Eir Sport and RTÉ provided live TV coverage of the league on Saturday nights. TG4 broadcast Sunday afternoon games. The highlights programmes were RTÉ2's League Sunday on Sunday evenings, and TG4's GAA 2021 on Monday evenings.

Galway and Kilkenny were the joint winners.

== Format ==
League structure

Thirty-two teams competed in the 2021 National Hurling League –

- twelve teams organised in two six-team groups of approximately equal strength in Division 1
- six teams in Division 2A
- five teams in Divisions 2B and 3A
- four teams in Division 3B.

All thirty-two county teams from Ireland took part.

London, Lancashire and Warwickshire did not take part; they retained their division placings (2B, 3A and 3B respectively) for the 2022 National Hurling League.

Teams by Province and Division
| Province | Div 1 | Div 2A | Div 2B | Div 3A | Div 3B | Total |
|---|---|---|---|---|---|---|
| Connacht | 1 | 0 | 2 | 1 | 1 | 5 |
| Leinster | 5 | 4 | 1 | 1 | 1 | 12 |
| Munster | 5 | 1 | 0 | 0 | 0 | 6 |
| Ulster | 1 | 1 | 2 | 3 | 2 | 9 |
| Total | 12 | 6 | 5 | 5 | 4 | 32 |

Each team plays all the other teams in their division once, either home or away. Two points are awarded for a win, and one for a draw.

Tie-breaker

- If only two teams are level on league points, the team that won the head-to-head match is ranked ahead. If this game was a draw, score difference (total scored minus total conceded in all games) is used to rank the teams.
- If three or more teams are level on league points, score difference is used to rank the teams.

Final, promotions and relegations

Division 1

- There is no final; there will either be joint winners, or if the teams that win Divisions 1A and 1B meet in the 2021 All-Ireland Senior Hurling Championship, this will double as the NHL final.
- The bottom team in each group meet in a relegation play-off, with the losers being relegated to Division 2A

Divisions 2A, 2B and 3A

- The first-placed team is the division champion and is promoted
- The bottom team is relegated

Division 3B

- The first-placed team is the Division 3B champion and is promoted to Division 3A

== Division 1 ==
Locations of the 2021 NHL Division 1 teams.
Red: Group A; Green: Group B.

=== Division 1 Format ===
The top twelve teams compete in Division 1 in two six-team groups of approximately equal strength. This group structure was introduced in 2020.

Each team play all the other teams in their group once. Two points are awarded for a win and one for a draw. The top team in each group will be deemed "Co-champion", unless they are drawn together in the 2021 All-Ireland Senior Hurling Championship, in which case the match will double up as the league final.

=== Division 1 Group A Table ===
NHL final Relegation play-off

| Team | Pld | W | D | L | F | A | Diff | Pts |
|---|---|---|---|---|---|---|---|---|
| Galway | 5 | 4 | 0 | 1 | 12-133 | 9-98 | 44 | 8 |
| Waterford | 5 | 3 | 0 | 2 | 8-123 | 13-111 | -3 | 6 |
| Tipperary | 5 | 2 | 2 | 1 | 9-109 | 4-101 | 23 | 6 |
| Limerick | 5 | 2 | 1 | 2 | 4-117 | 3-105 | 15 | 5 |
| Cork | 5 | 2 | 1 | 2 | 18-107 | 4-122 | 27 | 5 |
| Westmeath | 5 | 0 | 0 | 5 | 2-84 | 20-136 | -106 | 0 |

=== Division 1 Group A Rounds 1 to 5 ===
==== Division 1 Group A Round 1 ====
| 8 May 2021; Round 1 | Westmeath | 1-16 - 5-34 | Galway | TEG Cusack Park; Referee: S Stack (Dublin) |
| 8 May 2021; Round 1 | N O'Brien 0-11 (10f), N Mitchell 1-0, C Doyle 0-2, S Williams 0-1, J Boyle 0-1, D Glennon 0-1. | Report | E Niland 0-13 (10f), C Cooney 1-5 (0-1 pen), N Burke 1-4, J Mannion 1-3, B Concannon 1-1, C Whelan 1-0, C Mannion 0-2, F Burke 0-2 (1'sl), S Cooney 0-2, A Harte 0-1, J Coen 0-1. | TEG Cusack Park; Referee: S Stack (Dublin) |

| 8 May 2021; Round 1 | Limerick | 0-20 - 0-20 | Tipperary | LIT Gaelic Grounds; Referee: C Lyons (Cork) |
| 8 May 2021; Round 1 | D Reidy (0-8, 6 frees); S Flanagan (0-4); A Breen (0-3); P Casey (0-2); D O'Donovan, W O'Donoghue, D Byrnes (free) (0-1 each). | Report | J Forde (0-14, 11 frees, 1 65); R Maher (0-2, 1 free); N O'Meara, W Connors, D McCormack, M Breen (0-1 each). | LIT Gaelic Grounds; Referee: C Lyons (Cork) |

| 9 May 2021; Round 1 | Cork | 5-22 - 1-27 | Waterford | Páirc Uí Chaoimh; Referee: S Cleere (Kilkenny) |
| 9 May 2021; Round 1 | P Horgan 0-12 (0-7 frees, 0-2 65), A Connolly 2-0, R O'Flynn 1-1, D Fitzgibbon 0-3, J O'Connor, S Kingston 1-0 each, S Barrett, T O'Mahony (0-1 free) 0-2 each, L Meade, S Harnedy 0-1 each. | Report | Stephen Bennett 1-12 (0-7 frees, 0-1 65), A Gleeson 0-5, K Bennett 0-3, M Kearney 0-2, M Kiely, S McNulty, I Daly, J Fagan, P Curran 0-1 each. | Páirc Uí Chaoimh; Referee: S Cleere (Kilkenny) |

==== Division 1 Group A Round 2 ====
| 15 May 2021; Round 2 | Tipperary | 0-22 - 2-16 | Cork | Semple Stadium; Referee: J Ryan (Limerick) |
| 15 May 2021; Round 2 | J Forde (0-10, frees); J McGrath, N McGrath, B Heffernan (0-2 each); J O'Dwyer, J Morris, P Flynn, R Maher (free), B McGrath, C Barrett (0-1 each). | Report | P Horgan (1-6, 0-5 frees); T O'Mahony (1-1); A Cadogan (0-3); C Cahalane (0-2): R O'Flynn, D Connery, D Fitzgibbon, A Connolly (0-1 each). | Semple Stadium; Referee: J Ryan (Limerick) |

| 16 May 2021; Round 2 | Waterford | 1-22 - 1-19 | Westmeath | Walsh Park |
| 16 May 2021; Round 2 | P Curran (0-11, 11 frees), M Kearney (1-0), DJ Foran (0-3); K Bennett (0-2), K Power (0-2); P Hogan (0-1), K Moran (0-1), B Power (0-1); J Prendergast (0-1). | Report | K Doyle (1-7, five frees), N O'Brien (0-6, six frees), D Glennon (0-3); A Clarke (0-1), C Boyle (0-1), J Coll (0-1). | Walsh Park |

| 16 May 2021; Round 2 | Galway | 0-26 - 1-17 | Limerick | Pearse Stadium; Referee: J Owens (Wexford) |
| 16 May 2021; Round 2 | E Niland 0-14 (0-14 frees), C Whelan 0-3, C Mannion 0-2, J Canning 0-2 (0-1 free), David Burke 0-2, B Concannon 0-1, N Burke 0-1, J Mannion 0-1. | Report | D Reidy 0-8 (0-7 frees), A Gillane 0-4 (0-2 frees), S Flanagan 1-0, P Casey 0-2, G Hegarty 0-2, D Byrnes 0-1 (0-1 free). | Pearse Stadium; Referee: J Owens (Wexford) |

==== Division 1 Group A Round 3 ====
| 22 May 2021 | Tipperary | 2-19 - 0-20 | Galway | Semple Stadium; Referee: J Keenan (Wicklow) |
| 22 May 2021 | J Forde (1-5, 4 frees); N McGrath (1-2); J O'Dwyer (0-3); R Maher, M Breen (0-2 each); B Maher, N O'Meara, B Heffernan, R Byrne, P Flynn (0-1 each). | Report | J Canning (0-8, 1 65, 6 frees); B Concannon, E Niland (2 frees) (0-3 each); C Cooney (0-2); C Whelan, K Cooney, J Flynn (free), J Coen (0-1 each). | Semple Stadium; Referee: J Keenan (Wicklow) |

| 23 May 2021; Round 3 | Cork | 7-27 - 0-15 | Westmeath | Páirc Uí Chaoimh; Referee: T Walsh (Waterford) |
| 23 May 2021; Round 3 | P Horgan 2-4 (0-2f), A Cadogan 1-4, A Connolly 2-1, S Barrett 1-3, L Meade 1-2, D Connery 0-3 (0-2f), T O'Mahony, D Fitzgibbon, B Turnbull (0-2f) 0-2 each, C Cahalane, R Downey, S Twomey, S O'Leary Hayes 0-1 each. | Report | K Doyle (0-4f), J Coll 0-5 each, C Doyle 0-2, A Craig, A Clarke, D Glennon 0-1 each. | Páirc Uí Chaoimh; Referee: T Walsh (Waterford) |

| 23 May 2021; Round 3 | Waterford | 1-22 - 0-21 | Limerick | Walsh Park; Referee: P O'Dwyer (Carlow) |
| 23 May 2021; Round 3 | Stephen Bennett 0-8 (4fs, 3 65s), J Fagan 1-0, P Curran, C Lyons 0-3 each, K Bennett, J Prendergast 0-2 each, Shane Bennett (f), I Daly, J Barron, A Gleeson 0-1 each. | Report | A Gillane 0-11 (8fs, 2 65s), T Morrissey 0-3 (1f, 1 65), S Flanagan 0-2, D Hannon, K Hayes, C Lynch, D O'Donovan, P Casey 0-1 each. | Walsh Park; Referee: P O'Dwyer (Carlow) |

==== Division 1 Group A Round 4 ====
| 5 June 2021; Round 4 | Limerick | 0-33 - 2-19 | Cork | LIT Gaelic Grounds; Referee: A Kelly (Galway) |
| 5 June 2021; Round 4 | A Gillane (0-10, 9 frees); T Morrissey, C Lynch (0-4); D Byrnes (1 free, 1 65) (0-3); P Ryan, P Casey, C Coughlan, C O'Neill (0-2 each); A Breen, D O'Donovan, W O'Donoghue, B Nash (0-1 each). | Report | P Horgan 0-9 (0-6f, 0-2 '65), J O'Connor 2-1, S Kingston 0-2, D Dalton 0-2 (0-2f), M Coleman 0-2 (0-2f), C Cahalane 0-1, D Cahalane 0-1, R O'Flynn 0-1. | LIT Gaelic Grounds; Referee: A Kelly (Galway) |

| 6 June 2021; Round 4 | Westmeath | 0-16 - 4-27 | Tipperary | TEG Cusack Park |
| 6 June 2021; Round 4 | C Doyle 0-4 (0-4f), K Doyle 0-3 (0-3f), R Greville 0-2, D McNicholas (0-1f) and D Clinton 0-2 each, J Galvin, C Boyle and J Boyle 0-1 each. | Report | J Forde 2-7 (0-4f, 1-0 pen, 0-1 65), J McGrath 1-2, M Kehoe 1-2, J Morris 0-3 (0-1f), M Breen, P Cadell, B Heffernan and A Flynn 0-2 each, S Callanan, B Maher, N McGrath, D McCormack, W Connors and P Flynn 0-1 each. | TEG Cusack Park |

| 6 June 2021; Round 4 | Galway | 4-28 - 3-23 | Waterford | Pearse Stadium; Referee: F Horgan (Tipperary) |
| 6 June 2021; Round 4 | J Canning 1-8 (4fs, 1 sl) B Concannon 2-2, C Whelan 0-6, E Niland 0-4 A Tuohey 1-0, C Cooney 0-3, C Mannion, S Loftus 0-2 each, D Burke 0-1. : | Report | Stephen Bennett 0-8 (6fs, 1sl), D Hutchinson 1-3, C Lyons 0-5, J Prendergast 1-2, Shane Bennett 1-1 N Montgomery, K Bennett, J Barron, P Curran all 0-1 each | Pearse Stadium; Referee: F Horgan (Tipperary) |

==== Division 1 Group A Round 5 ====
| 13 June 2021; Round 5 | Westmeath | 0-18 - 3-26 | Limerick | TEG Cusack Park; Referee: C Mooney (Dublin) |
| 13 June 2021; Round 5 | N O'Brien 0-6 (5frees, 1 '65), C Doyle 0-3 (1free), D McNicholas, A Clarke and J Coll 0-2 each, C Boyle, A Cox and S Clavin 0-1 each. | | A Gillane 0-9 (5frees, 1 '65), S Flanagan 0-4, K Hayes 1-1, D O'Connell and P Ryan 1-0 each, T Morrissey 0-3, P Casey and B Murphy (1free) 0-2 each, B O'Grady, C Boylan, G Mulcahy, G Hegarty and R English 0-1 each. | TEG Cusack Park; Referee: C Mooney (Dublin) |

| 13 June 2021; Round 5 | Cork | 2-23 - 3-25 | Galway | Páirc Uí Chaoimh; Referee: P O'Dwyer (Carlow) |
| 13 June 2021; Round 5 | P Horgan 0-11 (0-8f), J O'Connor 1-2, D Fitzgibbon 0-4, C Cahalane 1-1, S Kingston 0-2, M Coleman, R O'Flynn, B Hennessy 0-1 each. | Report | E Niland 0-8 (0-4f, 0-2 '65) C Mannion 1-2, C Whelan, C Cooney 1-1 each, B Concannon 0-4, J Cooney 0-3, D Burke, P Mannion, F Burke, S Loftus, N Burke, J Flynn (0-1f) 0-1 each. | Páirc Uí Chaoimh; Referee: P O'Dwyer (Carlow) |

| 13 June 2021; Round 5 | Waterford | 2-29 - 3-21 | Tipperary | Walsh Park; Referee: J Owens (Wexford) |
| 13 June 2021; Round 5 | Stephen Bennett (0-15, 10 frees, 1 65); D Hutchinson (2-2); Shane Bennett, P Hogan (0-2 each); C Lyons, J Fagan, D Lyons, J Prendergast, C Kirwan, K Bennett, B Power, M Kiely (0-1 each). | Report | J Forde (1-5, 3 frees); N McGrath (1-2); S Callanan (1-1), R Maher (0-4, 1 65); A Flynn, J Morris (0-2); J McGrath, W Connors, M Breen, S Kennedy, B Maher (0-1 each). | Walsh Park; Referee: J Owens (Wexford) |

=== Division 1 Group B Table ===
NHL final Relegation play-off

| Team | Pld | W | D | L | F | A | Diff | Pts |
|---|---|---|---|---|---|---|---|---|
| Kilkenny | 5 | 4 | 0 | 1 | 6-129 | 7-98 | 28 | 8 |
| Wexford | 5 | 3 | 1 | 1 | 8-102 | 5-97 | 13 | 7 |
| Clare | 5 | 3 | 0 | 2 | 7-124 | 7-105 | 19 | 6 |
| Antrim | 5 | 2 | 1 | 2 | 8-98 | 5-116 | -9 | 5 |
| Dublin | 5 | 2 | 0 | 3 | 4-115 | 3-116 | 2 | 4 |
| Laois | 5 | 0 | 0 | 5 | 3-90 | 9-126 | -54 | 0 |

=== Division 1 Group B Rounds 1 to 5 ===
==== Division 1 Group B Round 1 ====
| 8 May 2021; Round 1 | Dublin | 0-18 - 1-20 | Kilkenny | Parnell Park |
| 8 May 2021; Round 1 | D Burke 0-7 (0-4f, 0-1 65), C Crummey 0-3, D Sutcliffe and D Treacy (0-2f) 0-2 each, E Dillon, D Keogh and C Boland 0-1 each. | Report | M Keoghan 1-4, TJ Reid 0-7 (0-6f, 0-1 65), J Bergin, J Donnelly and P Walsh 0-2 each, D Corcoran, C Buckley and A Murphy 0-1 each. | Parnell Park |

| 9 May 2021; Round 1 | Antrim | 1-21 - 0-22 | Clare | Corrigan Park; Referee: L Gordon (Galway) |
| 9 May 2021; Round 1 | C Clarke 1-11 (9f, 1 '65'), K Molloy, N McManus (2f) 0-3 each, C Cunning 0-2, E Campbell, C McCann 0-1 each. | Report | T Kelly 0-11 (7f, 1 '65), D Reidy 0-3, D Ryan, S O'Donnell 0-2 each, C Malone, C Guilfoyle, A Shanagher, A McCarthy 0-1 each. | Corrigan Park; Referee: L Gordon (Galway) |

| 9 May 2021; Round 1 | Wexford | 4-17 - 0-10 | Laois | Chadwicks Wexford Park; Referee: T Walsh (Waterford) |
| 9 May 2021; Round 1 | M Dwyer 2-0, C Hearne 1-1, H Kehoe (0-1f) and L Chin (0-3f) 0-3 each, G Bailey, D O'Keeffe and S Donohoe 0-2 each, C Devitt, S Casey (0-1f), J O'Connor (0-1 65) and C Devitt 0-1 each. | Report | PJ Scully 0-6 (0-3f, 0-1 65), R King 0-2, J Kelly and P Purcell 0-1 each. | Chadwicks Wexford Park; Referee: T Walsh (Waterford) |

==== Division 1 Group B Round 2 ====
| 15 May 2021; Round 2 | Laois | 1-19 - 0-30 | Dublin | MW Hire O'Moore Park; Referee: P O'Dwyer (Carlow) |
| 15 May 2021; Round 2 | PJ Scully 0-6 (all frees), R King 0-6 (0-4 frees), C Dwyer 1-3 (0-1 sideline cut), P Purcell 0-2, E Rowland (free), C Collier 0-1 each. | Report | D Burke 0-18 (0-14 frees, 0-1 65), C Burke, A Dunphy 0-2 each, D Gray, D Keogh, E Dillon, R McBride, F Whitely, C Boland, P Crummey, S Moran 0-1 each, | MW Hire O'Moore Park; Referee: P O'Dwyer (Carlow) |

| 16 May 2021; Round 2 | Clare | 1-21 - 2-19 | Wexford | Cusack Park |
| 16 May 2021; Round 2 | A McCarthy 1-8 (0-5f, 0-1 '65, 1-0 pen), T Kelly (0-3f), C Malone, A Shanagher 0-3 each, S Meehan, M Rodgers, D Fitzgerald, I Galvin 0-1 each. | Report | L Chin 1-5 (0-4f), R O'Connor 0-6 (0-4f), S Donohoe 1-0, D Dunne 0-3, S Reck, G Bailey, C Flood, D O'Keeffe, L Óg McGovern 0-1 each. | Cusack Park |

| 16 May 2021; Round 2 | Kilkenny | 1-28 - 3-15 | Antrim | UPMC Nowlan Park; Referee: S Stack (Dublin) |
| 16 May 2021; Round 2 | A Murphy 0-13 (9 f); E Cody 1-1; J Bergin 0-4; A Mullen 0-3; C Browne, M Keoghan 0-2 each; J Donnelly, P Deegan, R Reid 0-1 each. | Report | C Clarke 1-3 (3 f); J McNaughton 0-6 (2f); C Cunning 1-1; N McManus 1-0; C McCann 0-2; M Bradley, G Walsh, N McKenna 0-1 each. | UPMC Nowlan Park; Referee: S Stack (Dublin) |

==== Division 1 Group B Round 3 ====
| 22 May 2021; Round 3 | Dublin | 1-26 - 1-18 | Antrim | Parnell Park; Referee: S Cleere (Kilkenny) |
| 22 May 2021; Round 3 | D Burke 0-7 (4f, 1 '65), D Gray, D Sutliffe 0-3 each, R Hayes 1-0, C Boland, C Crummey, C Burke, J Hetherton 0-2 each, C O'Sullivan, S Moran, J Malone, P Crummey, D Keogh 0-1 each. | Report | N McManus 1-3 (1-0 pen, 0-2f), N McKenna 0-4, C Clarke (3f), J McNaughton (2f) 0-3 each, K Molloy, C Johnson 0-2 each, E Campbell 0-1. | Parnell Park; Referee: S Cleere (Kilkenny) |

| 23 May 2021; Round 3 | Laois | 1-17 - 2-27 | Clare | MW Hire O'Moore Park; Referee: P Murphy (Carlow) |
| 23 May 2021; Round 3 | PJ Scully 0-10 (8 frees, one 65), R King 1-2, P Purcell 0-2, J Ryan 0-1, C Stapleton 0-1, J Kelly 0-1 | Report | A McCarthy 0-13 (12 frees), M Rodgers 1-2, S O'Donnell 1-1, C Malone 0-4, I Galvin 0-2, D Ryan 0-2, J Conlon 0-1, J McCarthy 0-1, D Fitzgerald 0-1. | MW Hire O'Moore Park; Referee: P Murphy (Carlow) |

| 30 May 2021; Round 3 | Kilkenny | 2-27 - 0-23 | Wexford | UPMC Nowlan Park; Referee: C Lyons (Cork) |
| 30 May 2021; Round 3 | TJ Reid (1-18, 0-14 frees, 0-1 65m), B Ryan (1-4), A Murphy (0-3), P Deegan and E Cody (0-1 each). | Report | L Chin (0-13, 0-10 frees, 0-1 65), R O'Connor (0-4), A Nolan (0-2), Joe O'Connor, D O'Keeffe, C McDonald and S Murphy (0-1 each). | UPMC Nowlan Park; Referee: C Lyons (Cork) |

==== Division 1 Group B Round 4 ====
| 5 June 2021; Round 4 | Antrim | 1-21 - 2-18 | Wexford | Corrigan Park; Referee: P Murphy (Carlow) |
| 5 June 2021; Round 4 | J McNaughton (4f), C Cunning (6f, 1 65) 0-7 each, K Molloy 0-5, S Shannon 1-0, N McManus and C Johnston 0-1 each. | Report | L Chin 0-9 (8f), C McDonald, P Morris 1-1 each, L Og McGovern 0-2, M Fanning (1f), S Donohoe, A Nolan, R O'Connor, J O'Connor. | Corrigan Park; Referee: P Murphy (Carlow) |

| 5 June 2021; Round 4 | Dublin | 2-23 - 0-34 | Clare | Parnell Park; Referee: C Cunning (Antrim) |
| 5 June 2021; Round 4 | D Burke 0-13 (9f), R Hayes 1-2, C Boland 1-1, D Sutcliffe, C Crummey 0-2 each, D Gray, M Schutte, E Dillon 0-1 each. | Report | T Kelly 0-20 (0-13f, 1 '65), A McCarthy 0-4, D Fitzgerald, S O'Donnell, M Rodgers 0-2 each, A Shanagher, D Reidy, D Ryan, C Malone 0-1 each. - | Parnell Park; Referee: C Cunning (Antrim) |

| 6 June 2021; Round 4 | Kilkenny | 1-29 - 0-22 | Laois | UPMC Nowlan Park; Referee: R McGann (Clare) |
| 6 June 2021; Round 4 | E Cody 0-11 (0-9 frees, 0-1 65), J Bergin 0-5, L Blanchfield 1-2, R Reid, A Mullen and C Fogarty 0-2 each, M Carey, J Donnelly, T O'Dwyer, M Keoghan and B Ryan 0-1 each. | Report | PJ Scully 0-11 (0-9 frees, 0-1 65), R King 0-3, J Kelly and P Purcell 0-2 each, S Maher, L Cleere and A Dunphy 0-1, E Rowland 0-1 free. | UPMC Nowlan Park; Referee: R McGann (Clare) |

==== Division 1 Group B Round 5 ====
| 12 June 2021; Round 5 | Clare | 4-20 - 1-25 | Kilkenny | Cusack Park; Referee: J Murphy (Limerick) |
| 12 June 2021; Round 5 | T Kelly (2-5, 0-5fs), D Reidy (1-2), A Shanagher (1-1), D Ryan (0-3), A McCarthy (0-3), G Cooney (0-2), M Rodgers (0-1), D McInerney (0-1), S Golden (0-1), R Taylor (0-1). | Report | TJ Reid (0-9, 0-7fs, 0-2 65), E Cody (0-4), A Mullen (0-3), R Reid (0-3), B Ryan (0-2), R Leahy (0-1), W Walsh (0-1), D Blanchfield (0-1), A Murphy (0-1). | Cusack Park; Referee: J Murphy (Limerick) |

| 12 June 2021; Round 5 | Antrim | 2-23 - 1-22 | Laois | Corrigan Park; Referee: J Keenan (Wicklow) |
| 12 June 2021; Round 5 | C Cunning 0-9 (two frees, one 65), S Elliott 0-5, P Burke 1-1, N McCormack 1-0, E O'Neill 0-2, C Clarke 0-2, N McKenna 0-2, A O'Brien 0-1, E Campbell 0-1. | Report | PJ Scully 1-3 (three frees), J Kelly 0-5, R King 0-3 (two frees), A Dunphy 0-2, S Maher 0-2, W Dunphy 0-2, R Mullaney 0-2, C Collier 0-1, P Purcell 0-1, E Rowland 0-1 (one free). | Corrigan Park; Referee: J Keenan (Wicklow) |

| 12 June 2021; Round 5 | Wexford | 0-25 - 1-18 | Dublin | Chadwicks Wexford Park |
| 12 June 2021; Round 5 | L Chin (0-10, 7f), M Fanning (0-04, 4f); R O'Connor (0-03), P Morris (0-03); C McDonald (0-01), D O'Keefe (0-01), A Nolan (0-01), M Dwyer (0-01), C Devitt (0-01). | Report | D Burke (1-10, 1-00 pen, 9f); D Sutcliffe (0-02), C O'Callaghan (0-01); D Gray (0-01), C Boland (0-01), F Whitely for (0-01), J Malone (0-01), O O'Rourke (0-01, 1f). | Chadwicks Wexford Park |

=== Division 1 Final ===
If the two teams that won Divisions 1A and 1B (Galway and Kilkenny respectively) had met in the 2021 All-Ireland Senior Hurling Championship, this would have doubled as the league final. This did not happen so both teams were declared as joint winners.

| NHL Final | Galway | Not Played | Kilkenny |

=== Division 1 relegation play-off ===
The bottom teams in the two Division 1 groups met in a play-off with the losers (Westmeath) relegated to Division 2A.

| 24 July 2021; 19:30 IST (UTC+1) | Westmeath | 0-27 - 1-27 | Laois | O'Moore Park, Portlaoise; Referee: Patrick Murphy (Carlow) |
| 24 July 2021; 19:30 IST (UTC+1) | Killian Doyle 0-11 (0-8f), Niall O'Brien 0-7, Derek McNicholas 0-3, Ciaran Doyle 0-2, Niall Mitchell 0-1, Joey Boyle 0-1, Aaron Craig 0-1, Kevin Regan 0-1 | Report | PJ Scully 0-17 (0-11f, 0-3 '65), Ross King 1-2, Charles Dwyer 0-3, Willie Dunphy 0-2, Jack Kelly 0-2, Paddy Purcell 0-1 | O'Moore Park, Portlaoise; Referee: Patrick Murphy (Carlow) |

=== Division 1 scoring statistics ===
Top scorers overall

| Rank | Player | Team | Tally | Total | Matches | Average |
|---|---|---|---|---|---|---|
| 1 | Donal Burke | Dublin | 1-55 | 58 | 5 | 11.60 |
| 2 | P. J. Scully | Laois | 1-53 | 56 | 6 | 9.33 |
| 3 | Jason Forde | Tipperary | 4-41 | 53 | 5 | 10.60 |
| 4 | Patrick Horgan | Cork | 3-42 | 51 | 5 | 10.20 |
| 5 | Stephen Bennett | Waterford | 1-43 | 46 | 4 | 11.50 |
| 6 | Tony Kelly | Clare | 2-39 | 45 | 4 | 11.25 |
| 7 | Lee Chin | Wexford | 1-40 | 43 | 5 | 8.60 |
| 8 | Evan Niland | Galway | 0-42 | 42 | 5 | 8.40 |
| 9 | T. J. Reid | Kilkenny | 1-34 | 37 | 3 | 12.33 |
| 10 | Aaron Gillane | Limerick | 0-34 | 34 | 4 | 8.50 |

Top scorers in a single game

| Rank | Player | Team | Tally | Total | Opposition |
|---|---|---|---|---|---|
| 1 | T. J. Reid | Kilkenny | 1-18 | 21 | Wexford |
| 2 | Tony Kelly | Clare | 0-20 | 20 | Dublin |
| 3 | Donal Burke | Dublin | 0-18 | 18 | Laois |
| 4 | P. J. Scully | Laois | 0-17 | 17 | Westmeath |
| 5 | Stephen Bennett | Waterford | 0-15 | 15 | Tipperary |
| 5 | Stephen Bennett | Waterford | 1-12 | 15 | Cork |
| 7 | Ciarán Clarke | Antrim | 1-11 | 14 | Clare |
| 7 | Jason Forde | Tipperary | 0-14 | 14 | Limerick |
| 7 | Evan Niland | Galway | 0-14 | 14 | Limerick |
| 10 | Jason Forde | Tipperary | 2-07 | 13 | Westmeath |
| 10 | Donal Burke | Dublin | 1-10 | 13 | Wexford |
| 10 | Evan Niland | Galway | 0-13 | 13 | Westmeath |
| 10 | Lee Chin | Wexford | 0-13 | 13 | Kilkenny |
| 10 | Aidan McCarthy | Clare | 0-13 | 13 | Laois |
| 10 | Alan Murphy | Kilkenny | 0-13 | 13 | Antrim |
| 10 | Donal Burke | Dublin | 0-13 | 13 | Clare |

== Division 2A ==
Locations of the 2021 NHL Division 2A teams.

=== Division 2A Table ===
Division champions, promoted to Division 1 Automatic relegation to Division 2B

| Team | Pld | W | D | L | F | A | Diff | Pts |
|---|---|---|---|---|---|---|---|---|
| Offaly (C, P) | 5 | 5 | 0 | 0 | 13-135 | 5-68 | 91 | 10 |
| Carlow | 5 | 3 | 0 | 2 | 15-107 | 5-93 | 44 | 6 |
| Down | 5 | 3 | 0 | 2 | 11-107 | 12-89 | 15 | 6 |
| Kerry | 5 | 3 | 0 | 2 | 9-99 | 6-113 | -5 | 6 |
| Meath | 5 | 1 | 0 | 4 | 3-84 | 13-111 | -57 | 2 |
| Wicklow (R) | 5 | 0 | 0 | 5 | 1-69 | 11-127 | -83 | 0 |

=== Division 2A Rounds 1 to 5 ===
==== Division 2A Round 1 ====
| 9 May 2021; Round 1 | Kerry | 4-18 - 0-19 | Down | Austin Stack Park; Referee: P Murphy (Carlow) |
| 9 May 2021; Round 1 | S Nolan ( 1-6, 3 '65s, 2 fs), M O'Connor (2-0), F O'Sullivan (1-1), D Collins (0-4), M Boyle (0-2), B O'Mahony, F Mackessy, P O'Connor, M Leane and D Hunt (0-1 each). | Report | P Sheehan (0-11, 7fs, 3 '65), R Costello and Tim Prenter (0-2 each), L Savage, D Hughes, E Sands and P J Davidson (0-1 each). | Austin Stack Park; Referee: P Murphy (Carlow) |

| 9 May 2021; Round 1 | Meath | 3-09 - 3-25 | Offaly | Páirc Tailteann |
| 9 May 2021; Round 1 | P O'Hanrahan (0-4, three frees); J McGowan (1-0), M O'Sullivan (1-0), A Douglas (0-2); A Gannon (0-1), J Regan (0-1), G McGowan (0-1). | Report | E Cahill (0-12, eight frees, two sidelines), L Langton (0-5), S Kinsella (1-0), A Hynes (1-0), O Kelly (1-0), B Duignan (0-2); L Fox (0-1, free), R Ravenhill (0-1); B Watkins (0-1), B Conneely (0-1), S Dooley (0-1, one free), J Sampson (0-1). | Páirc Tailteann |

| 9 May 2021; Round 1 | Carlow | 3-19 - 0-17 | Wicklow | Netwatch Cullen Park |
| 9 May 2021; Round 1 | M Kavanagh (2-9, 0-8 frees), R Smithers (1-0); C Wall (0-3); C Nolan (0-3, 1 free), J Kavanagh (0-2), JM Nolan (0-2). | Report | C Moorehouse (0-8 frees), A O'Brien (0-3), M Boland (0-2), D Staunton (0-2, 1 free), E McCormack (0-1), M Lee (0-1). | Netwatch Cullen Park |

==== Division 2A Round 2 ====
| 15 May 2021; Round 2 | Wicklow | 0-11 - 0-20 | Meath | Aughrim County Ground; Referee: T Gleeson (Waterford) |
| 15 May 2021; Round 2 | C Moorehouse 0-5 frees; A O'Brien 0-2 one free; E McCormack 0-1; L Evans 0-1; W Kinsella 0-1; D Staunton 0-1. | Report | J Regan 0-6 five frees; P O'Hanrahan 0-4 three frees; G McGowan 0-3; A Gannon 0-2; M O'Sullivan 0-2; P Conneely 0-1; A Douglas 0-1; J Kelly 0-1. | Aughrim County Ground; Referee: T Gleeson (Waterford) |

| 16 May 2021; Round 2 | Down | 3-20 - 3-18 | Carlow | McKenna Park |
| 16 May 2021; Round 2 | P Sheehan (1-9, 0-8 frees), C Woods (2-0, 1-0 pen, 1-0 free), C Egan (0-2), P Óg McCrickard (0-2), D Hughes (0-2), D Sands (0-2), C Taggart, O MacManus, L Savage (0-1 each) | Report | M Kavanagh (0-12, 0-10 frees), J Nolan (2-2), C Nolan (1-2), J Kavanagh (0-2). | McKenna Park |

| 16 May 2021; Round 2 | Offaly | 2-28 - 0-13 | Kerry | Bord na Móna O'Connor Park |
| 16 May 2021; Round 2 | L Langton (1-6), E Cahill (0-8, 3F, 1 "65"), B Duignan (0-5); O Kelly (0-2), J Murphy (0-2), S Kinsella (0-1), P Guinan (0-1), K Sampson (0-1); L Fox (0-1), D Nally (0-1). | Report | S Nolan (0-4, 3f, 1 "65"), P Boyle (0-4), J Diggins (0-1), M Leane (0-1); C Walsh (0-1), E Leen (0-1), F O'Sullivan (0-1). | Bord na Móna O'Connor Park |

==== Division 2A Round 3 ====
| 23 May 2021; Round 3 | Kerry | 1-24 - 0-24 | Meath | Austin Stack Park |
| 23 May 2021; Round 3 | S Conway (0-11, 8 f's, 1'65), S Nolan (1-2) B O'Leary (0-4, 1 sideline), D Collins (0-3), M O'Connor (0-2), P O'Connor and M Boyle ( 0-1 each). | | J Regan ( 0-12, 9 f's), J Toher (0-3), J Kelly, D Reilly, D McGowan, G McGowan, P Connelly, E O Donnchadha, S Morris, D Healy and M O'Sullivan ( 0-1 each). | Austin Stack Park |

| 23 May 2021; Round 3 | Carlow | 1-17 - 2-25 | Offaly | Netwatch Cullen Park; Referee: T Gleeson (Carlow) |
| 23 May 2021; Round 3 | M Kavanagh 0-13 (8f and 3 '65s'), JM Nolan 1-0, K McDonald, C Wall, C Nolan and P Coady 0-1 each. | Report | E Cahill (1-12, 9F), O Kelly (1-4), L Langton (0-4), B Duignan (0-1); L Fox (0-1), S Kinsella (0-1), A Treacy (0-1), J Murphy (0-1). | Netwatch Cullen Park; Referee: T Gleeson (Carlow) |

| 23 May 2021; Round 3 | Wicklow | 0-14 - 3-26 | Down | Aughrim County Ground; Referee: C Mooney (Dublin) |
| 23 May 2021; Round 3 | A O'Brien (0-7, 4f, 2 65), C Moorehouse (0-3, 1f), E Kearns (0-2), D Staunton (0-1); M Lee (0-1). | Report | P Sheehan (0-11, 9f), E Sands (2-1), O McManus (1-3, 1f), D Sands (0-3), M Fisher (0-2), C Woods (0-1f), L Savage (0-1); P Óg McCrickard (0-1); T Prenter (0-1), PJ Davidson (0-1), J Doran (0-1). | Aughrim County Ground; Referee: C Mooney (Dublin) |

==== Division 2A Round 4 ====
| 5 June 2021; Round 4 | Kerry | 4-30 - 1-17 | Wicklow | Austin Stack Park; Referee: K Jordan (Tipperary) |
| 5 June 2021; Round 4 | S Conway ( 1-13, 8 f's, 1'65), M Boyle ( 2-3), C Hussey ( 0-4), N Guerin ( 1-0), S Nolan ( 0-3), P Boyle ( 0-2), T O'Connor, D Collins, M Leane, J Diggins and C Walsh ( 0-1 each). | Report | C Moorehouse (0-13, 10's), G Hughes (1-1), M Lee (0-2), D Stanton (0-1free). | Austin Stack Park; Referee: K Jordan (Tipperary) |

| 6 June 2021; Round 0:17 | Meath | 0-17 - 5-28 | Carlow | Páirc Tailteann; Referee: R Fitzsimons (Offaly) |
| 6 June 2021; Round 0:17 | J Regan 0-5 four frees; P O'Hanrahan 0-4; K Keoghan 0-2; A Douglas 0-2; J Kelly 0-1; A Gannon 0-1; M O'Sullivan 0-1; E O Donnchadha 0-1. | Report | M Kavanagh 1-12, eight frees, two '65s'; K McDonnell 2-0; JM Nolan 1-3; C Nolan 1-5; G Coady 0-1; R Coady 0-1; T Joyce 0-1; J Doyle 0-1; J Nolan 0-1; C Wall 0-1; P Coady 0-1; T Lawlor 0-1. | Páirc Tailteann; Referee: R Fitzsimons (Offaly) |

| 6 June 2021; Round 4 | Offaly | 5-25 - 1-19 | Down | St. Brendan's Park; Referee: S Hynes (Galway) |
| 6 June 2021; Round 4 | E Cahill 1-11 (4f, 1-0 pen, 0-2 '65), L Langton 2-3, B Duignan 1-0, O Kelly 1-0, J Sampson 0-3, K Sampson 0-1, L Fox 0-1, A Treacy (f) 0-1 each, J Murphy 0-3, D Nally 0-1, S Dooley 0-1. | Report | P Sheehan 1-5 (1-0 pen, 3f, 0-1 '65), E Sands 0-3, R Costello 0-4, R McCusker 0-1, D Hughes 0-1, P McCrickard 0-1, O McManus 0-4 (3f). | St. Brendan's Park; Referee: S Hynes (Galway) |

==== Division 2A Round 5 ====
| 13 June 2021; Round 5 | Down | 4-23 - 0-14 | Meath | McKenna Park |

| 13 June 2021; Round 5 | Carlow | 3-25 - 0-14 | Kerry | Netwatch Cullen Park; Referee: N Wall (Cork) |
| 13 June 2021; Round 5 | M Kavanagh 1-14 (12f, 1 '65), J M Nolan 1-3, C Nolan 1-1, Jon Nolan, K McDonald 0-2 each, J Doyle, T Joyce, G Lawlor 0-1 each. | Report | P Boyle, S Conway 0-4 (4f) each, M Boyle, C O'Keeffe 0-2 each, B Murphy (line ball), E Ross 0-1 each. | Netwatch Cullen Park; Referee: N Wall (Cork) |

| 13 June 2021; Round 5 | Wicklow | 0-10 - 1-32 | Offaly | Baltinglass; Referee: D Hughes (Kilkenny) |
| 13 June 2021; Round 5 | D Staunton (1f), A O'Brien and J Doyle 0-2 each, G Byrne, E Kearns, M Lee and C Moorehouse (f) 0-1 each. | Report | S Dooley 0-17 (13f and 1 "65"), J Murphy 1-3, L O'Connor 0-5, A Treacy 0-2, J Keenaghan, C Langton, D Egan, A Cleary and A Maher 0-1 each. | Baltinglass; Referee: D Hughes (Kilkenny) |

=== Division 2A scoring statistics ===
Top scorers overall

| Rank | Player | Club | Tally | Total | Matches | Average |
|---|---|---|---|---|---|---|
| 1 | Marty Kavanagh | Carlow | 4-60 | 72 | 5 | 14.40 |
| 2 | Eoghan Cahill | Offaly | 2-43 | 49 | 4 | 12.25 |
| 3 | Paul Sheehan | Down | 2-36 | 42 | 4 | 10.50 |
| 4 | Shane Conway | Kerry | 1-28 | 31 | 3 | 10.33 |
| 5 | Christy Moorehouse | Wicklow | 0-30 | 30 | 5 | 6.00 |
| 6 | Liam Langton | Offaly | 3-18 | 27 | 4 | 6.75 |
| 7 | John Michael Nolan | Carlow | 5-10 | 25 | 5 | 5.00 |
| 8 | Jack Regan | Meath | 0-24 | 24 | 4 | 6.00 |
| 9 | Chris Nolan | Carlow | 3-12 | 21 | 5 | 4.25 |
| 9 | Shane Nolan | Kerry | 2-15 | 21 | 5 | 4.20 |

Top scorers in a single game

| Rank | Player | Team | Tally | Total | Opposition |
|---|---|---|---|---|---|
| 1 | Marty Kavanagh | Carlow | 1-14 | 17 | Kerry |
| 1 | Shane Dooley | Offaly | 0-17 | 17 | Wicklow |
| 2 | Shane Conway | Kerry | 1-13 | 16 | Wicklow |
| 3 | Marty Kavanagh | Carlow | 2-09 | 15 | Wicklow |
| 3 | Eoghan Cahill | Offaly | 1-12 | 15 | Carlow |
| 3 | Marty Kavanagh | Carlow | 1-12 | 15 | Meath |
| 4 | Eoghan Cahill | Offaly | 1-11 | 14 | Down |
| 5 | Marty Kavanagh | Carlow | 0-13 | 13 | Offaly |
| 5 | Christy Moorehouse | Wicklow | 0-13 | 13 | Kerry |
| 6 | Paul Sheehan | Down | 1-09 | 12 | Carlow |
| 6 | Marty Kavanagh | Carlow | 0-12 | 12 | Down |
| 6 | Jack Regan | Meath | 0-12 | 12 | Kerry |
| 6 | Eoghan Cahill | Offaly | 0-12 | 12 | Meath |

== Division 2B ==
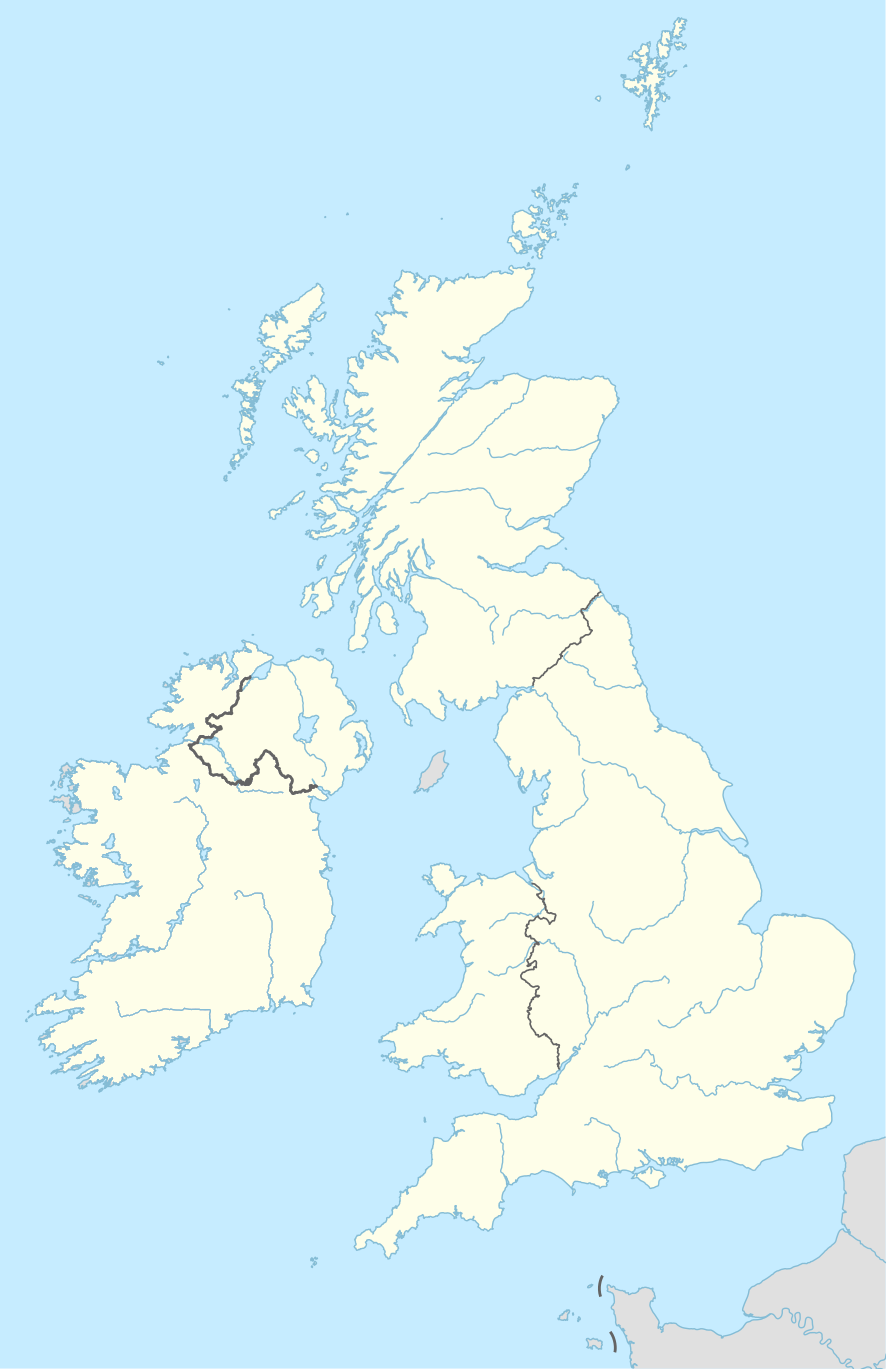
Locations of the 2021 NHL Division 2B teams.

=== Division 2B Table ===
Division champions, promoted to Division 2A Relegation to Division 3A

| Team | Pld | W | D | L | F | A | Diff | Pts |
|---|---|---|---|---|---|---|---|---|
| Kildare | 4 | 4 | 0 | 0 | 15-95 | 2-57 | 77 | 8 |
| Derry | 4 | 2 | 0 | 2 | 6-78 | 8-73 | -1 | 4 |
| Donegal | 4 | 2 | 0 | 2 | 8-66 | 8-75 | -9 | 4 |
| Mayo | 4 | 2 | 0 | 2 | 2-73 | 8-67 | -12 | 4 |
| Roscommon | 4 | 0 | 0 | 4 | 2-44 | 7-84 | -55 | 0 |

- London did not compete in 2021 due to the impact of the COVID-19 pandemic on Gaelic games. They returned to Division 2B in 2022.

=== Division 2B Rounds 1 to 5 ===
==== Division 2B Round 1 ====
| 9 May 2021; Round 1 | Donegal | 1-13 - 1-11 | Roscommon | O'Donnell Park |
| 9 May 2021; Round 1 | D Coulter 0-9, R McDermott 1-1, G Gilmore 0-2, N Cleary 0-1. | Report | C Dolan 1-5, C Kenny 0-3, G Egan 0-1, C Mulry 0-1, O Kelly 0-1. | O'Donnell Park |

| 9 May 2021; Round 1 | Mayo | 0-21 - 1-16 | Derry | Elvery's McHale Park |
| 9 May 2021; Round 1 | S Boland (0-8, 6f), C Freeman (0-3), K Higgins (0-3, 1f), A Phillips (0-2), S Regan (0-2); B Hunt (0-2), J Cassidy (0-1). | Report | C O'Doherty (0-11, 9f, 1 '65'), N Ferris (1-2), P Cleary (0-1), G Bradley (0-1), B Cassidy (0-1). | Elvery's McHale Park |

==== Division 2B Round 2 ====
| 15 May 2021; Round 2 | Kildare | 4-29 - 0-14 | Donegal | St. Conleth's Park |
| 15 May 2021; Round 2 | B Byrne 0-11 (7f, 2 '65'), J Burke 2-1 (1-0 pen); J Byrne 1-3, C Dowling 1-1 (0-1f), P Divilly 0-3; C Smith 0-3, K Aherne 0-3, S Whelan 0-2, D Flaherty 0-1, C Kielty 0-1. | Report | D Coulter 0-7 (7f), D Cullen 0-3, C Mathewson 0-3 (3f); N Cleary 0-1. | St. Conleth's Park |

| 15 May 2021; Round 2 | Roscommon | 1-09 - 1-20 | Mayo | Dr. Hyde Park |
| 15 May 2021; Round 2 | C Dolan (0-5, 0-3f), J Lohan (1-0), O Coyle (0-1), E Costello (0-1), A Finnerty (0-1), S Naughton (0-1). | Report | K Higgins (1-5, 0-3 65', 0-1f), S Boland (0-4, 0-3f), C Freeman (0-3), P McCrann (0-2f), C Scahill (0-2), B Morley (0-1), G Kelly (0-1f), K Kiely (0-1), A Phillips (0-1). | Dr. Hyde Park |

==== Division 2B Round 3 ====
| 23 May 2021; Round 3 | Donegal | 4-18 - 0-13 | Mayo | O'Donnell Park |
| 23 May 2021; Round 3 | D Coulter 2-8, R Ryan 1-2, B Lafferty 0-4, R McDermott 1-0, R Campbell 0-2, D Cullen 0-1, S McVeigh 0-1. | Report | S Boland 0-4, A Phillips 0-2, C Freeman 0-1, E Delaney 0-1, C Scahill 0-1, B Morley 0-1, B Hunt 0-1, M Phillips 0-1, C Phillips 0-1. | O'Donnell Park |

| 23 May 2021; Round 3 | Kildare | 5-17 - 1-14 | Derry | Manguard Plus Hawkfield |
| 23 May 2021; Round 3 | J Byrne 3-4; J Burke 1-1, C Dowling 1-0, P Divilly 0-3; B Byrne 0-3, J Sheridan 0-2, T Forde 0-1, D Slattery 0-1, S Ryan 0-1, C Chan 0-1. | Report | B Cassidy 1-7, C O'Doherty 0-4, S McGuigan 0-1, J Mullan 0-1, S Cassidy 0-1. | Manguard Plus Hawkfield |

==== Division 2B Round 4 ====
| 6 June 2021; Round 4 | Derry | 3-22 - 3-21 | Donegal | Celtic Park |
| 6 June 2021; Round 4 | C O'Doherty 0-13 (10f, 1 '65'), B Cassidy 1-2, S McGuigan 1-1, J Mullan 1-1, R Mullan 0-3, G Bradley and O McKeever 0-1 each. | Report | D Coulter 0-10 (2 '65', 7f), C Matthewson 1-4, R McDermott 1-2, G Gilmore 1-1, R Ryan 0-2, C O'Grady and D Cullen 0-1 each. | Celtic Park |

| 6 June 2021; Round 4 | Roscommon | 0-10 - 4-25 | Kildare | Dr. Hyde Park |
| 6 June 2021; Round 4 | C Dolan 0-5 (4f), B McGahon 0-2, C Kenny 0-1, P Dolan 0-1, P Kellehan 0-1. | Report | J Sheridan 2-5 (1-0f, 0-1 s/line), D Slattery 2-1, P Divilly 0-5; B Byrne 0-3, K Aherne 0-2, G Keegan 0-2, J Burke 0-2, C Dowling 0-2, S Leacy 0-1; J Byrne 0-1; S Christanseen 0-1. | Dr. Hyde Park |

==== Division 2B Round 5 ====
| 12 June 2021; Round 5 | Derry | 1-26 - 0-14 | Roscommon | Celtic Park |
| 12 June 2021; Round 5 | C O'Doherty (0-7, 4f, 1 65), G Bradley (1-2), J Mullan (0-5), O McKeever (0-4), S McGuigan (0-3), D Foley (0-2, 1f), M McGuigan (0-1), R Mullan (0-1), S Cassidy (0-1). | Report | C Dolan (0-10, 2f, 1 65), E Costello (0-2), C Kenny (0-1). | Celtic Park |

| 12 June 2021; Round 5 | Mayo | 1-19 - 2-24 | Kildare | Elvery's MacHale Park |
| 12 June 2021; Round 5 | K Higgins 0-8, S Regan 1-3, C Freeman 0-3, A Phillips 0-1, S Boland 0-1, C Scahill 0-1, P McCrann 0-1, J Cassidy 0-1. | Report | J Sheridan 0-9, D Slattery 1-2, J Burke 0-5, C Dowling 1-1, C McCabe 0-2, J Byrne 0-2, P Divilly 0-1, S Ryan 0-1, K Whelan 0-1. | Elvery's MacHale Park |

=== Division 2B scoring statistics ===
Top scorers overall

| Rank | Player | Club | Tally | Total | Matches | Average |
|---|---|---|---|---|---|---|
| 1 | Declan Coulter | Donegal | 2-34 | 40 | 4 | 10.00 |
| 2 | Cormac O'Doherty | Derry | 0-35 | 35 | 4 | 8.75 |
| 3 | Cathal Dolan | Roscommon | 1-25 | 28 | 4 | 7.00 |
| 4 | Johnny Byrne | Kildare | 4-10 | 22 | 4 | 5.50 |
| 4 | Jack Sheridan | Kildare | 2-16 | 22 | 3 | 7.33 |
| 5 | Keith Higgins | Mayo | 1-16 | 19 | 3 | 6.33 |
| 6 | James Burke | Kildare | 3-09 | 18 | 4 | 4.50 |
| 7 | Brian Byrne | Kildare | 0-17 | 17 | 4 | 4.25 |
| 7 | Shane Boland | Mayo | 0-17 | 17 | 4 | 4.25 |
| 8 | Brian Cassidy | Derry | 2-10 | 16 | 3 | 5.33 |

Top scorers in a single game

| Rank | Player | Team | Tally | Total | Opposition |
|---|---|---|---|---|---|
| 1 | Declan Coulter | Donegal | 2-08 | 14 | Mayo |
| 2 | Johnny Byrne | Kildare | 3-04 | 13 | Derry |
| 2 | Cormac O'Doherty | Derry | 0-13 | 13 | Donegal |
| 3 | Jack Sheridan | Kildare | 2-05 | 11 | Roscommon |
| 3 | Cormac O'Doherty | Derry | 0-11 | 11 | Mayo |
| 3 | Brian Byrne | Kildare | 0-11 | 11 | Donegal |
| 4 | Brian Cassidy | Derry | 1-07 | 10 | Kildare |
| 4 | Declan Coulter | Donegal | 0-10 | 10 | Derry |
| 4 | Cathal Dolan | Roscommon | 0-10 | 8 | Derry |
| 5 | Declan Coulter | Donegal | 0-09 | 9 | Roscommon |
| 5 | Jack Sheridan | Kildare | 0-09 | 9 | Mayo |

== Division 3A ==
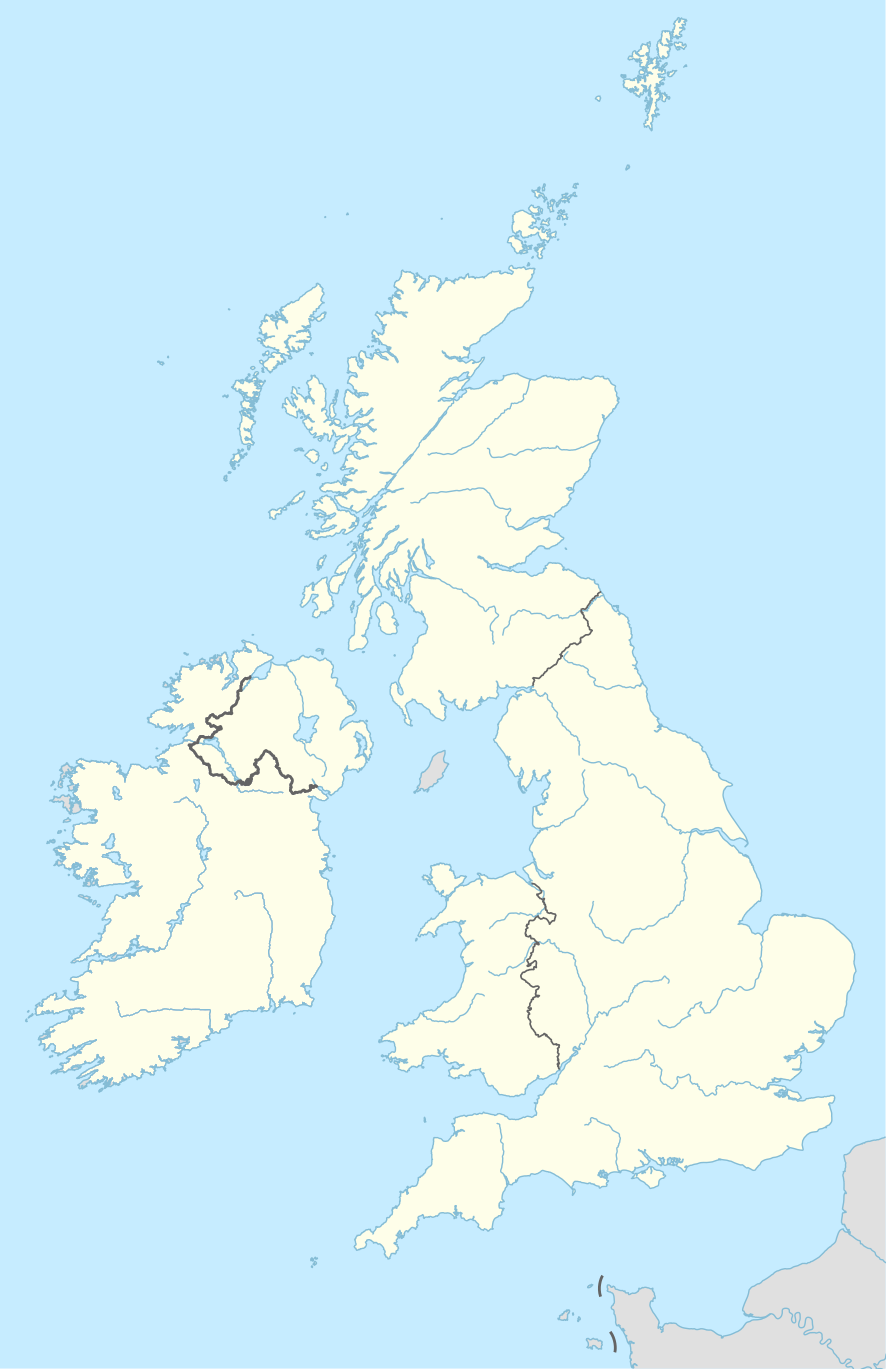
Locations of the 2021 NHL Division 3A teams.

=== Division 3A Table ===
Division champions, automatic promotion to Division 2B Automatic relegation to Division 3B

| Team | Pld | W | D | L | F | A | Diff | Pts |
|---|---|---|---|---|---|---|---|---|
| Sligo | 4 | 4 | 0 | 0 | 8-86 | 3-69 | 32 | 8 |
| Armagh | 4 | 3 | 0 | 1 | 5-91 | 6-73 | 15 | 6 |
| Tyrone | 4 | 1 | 1 | 2 | 5-79 | 6-78 | -2 | 3 |
| Monaghan | 4 | 1 | 0 | 3 | 5-67 | 5-86 | -19 | 2 |
| Longford | 4 | 0 | 1 | 3 | 7-69 | 10-86 | -26 | 1 |

- Warwickshire did not compete in 2021 due to the impact of the COVID-19 pandemic on Gaelic games. They returned to Division 3A in 2022.

=== Division 3A Rounds 1 to 5 ===
==== Division 3A Round 1 ====
| 16 May 2021; Round 1 | Armagh | 2-21 - 0-15 | Longford | Athletic Grounds |
| 16 May 2021; Round 1 | F Donnelly (0-11), S Keenan (1-2), D Magee (1-1), E McGuinness (0-2), P McBride (0-2), A Fox (0-2), J Shortt (0-1). | | J O'Brien (0-9), S Creaven (0-3), R Murray (0-1), C Mullane (0-1), D Buckley (0-1). | Athletic Grounds |

| 16 May 2021; Round 1 | Tyrone | 1-25 - 2-13 | Monaghan | Healy Park |
| 16 May 2021; Round 1 | D Casey (1-16), B McGurk (0-2); T Morgan (0-2), CJ McGourty (0-2), L Armstrong (0-1), SP McKernan (0-1), R Weir (0-1). | | S Lambe (2-2), F Rafter (0-6), M Treanor (0-1); N Garland (0-1), H Byrne (0-1); S Slevin (0-1), P McGahon (0-1). | Healy Park |

==== Division 3A Round 2 ====
| 22 May 2021; Round 2 | Longford | 2-22 - 2-22 | Tyrone | Glennon Brothers Pearse Park |
| 22 May 2021; Round 2 | C Mullane (2-3), J O'Brien (0-8), D Buckley (0-5), S Creaven (0-2), M Coyle (0-1), L Kelly (0-1); P Barden Jnr (0-1), C Kavanagh (0-1). | | CJ McGourty (2-4), D Casey (0-9), T Morgan (0-4), M Little (0-2), L Devlin (0-1), B McGurk (0-1); D Grogan (0-1); | Glennon Brothers Pearse Park |

| 22 May 2021; Round 2 | Sligo | 2-24 - 1-18 | Armagh | Markievicz Park |
| 22 May 2021; Round 2 | G O'Kelly-Lynch (1-11), J McHugh (1-3), T Cawley (0-3), T O'Kelly-Lynch (0-2); C Hannify (0-2); K Banks (0-1), R McHugh (0-1), F Moylan (0-1). | | F Donnelly (0-13), M McClatchey (1-0), E McGuinness (0-2), P McKearney (0-1); O Curry (0-1); D Magee (0-1). | Markievicz Park |

==== Division 3A Round 3 ====
| 29 May 2021; Round 3 | Sligo | 5-23 - 2-19 | Longford | Markievicz Park |
| 29 May 2021; Round 3 | G O'Kelly-Lynch (3-9), J McHugh (1-2); T Cawley (1-2), T O'Kelly-Lynch (0-3); M Munnelly (0-2), K Banks (0-2), F Cawley (0-1), F Moylan (0-1), E Comerford (0-1). | | J O'Brien (0-11), D Buckley (0-3), J Mulhern (1-0), M Coyle (1-0), S Creaven (0-2), D Sheedy (0-1); E Naughton (0-1), E Tully (0-1). | Markievicz Park |

| 30 May 2021; Round 3 | Monaghan | 2-15 - 1-27 | Armagh | Grattan Park |
| 30 May 2021; Round 3 | | | F Donnelly 0-10, E McGuinness 1-1, P McKearney 0-4, D Magee 0-3, P McBride 0-2, S McKearney 0-2, O Curry 0-2, T O'Neill 0-1, A Fox 0-1, C Clifford 0-1. | Grattan Park |

==== Division 3A Round 4 ====
| 12 June 2021; Round 4 | Longford | 3-13 - 1-20 | Monaghan | Glennon Brothers Pearse Park |

| 12 June 2021; Round 4 | Tyrone | 0-13 - 1-18 | Sligo | Healy Park |

==== Division 3A Round 5 ====
| 19 June 2021; Round 5 | Armagh | 1-25 - 2-19 | Tyrone | Athletic Grounds |

| 19 June 2021; Round 5 | Monaghan | 0-19 - 0-21 | Sligo | Inniskeen |

== Division 3B ==
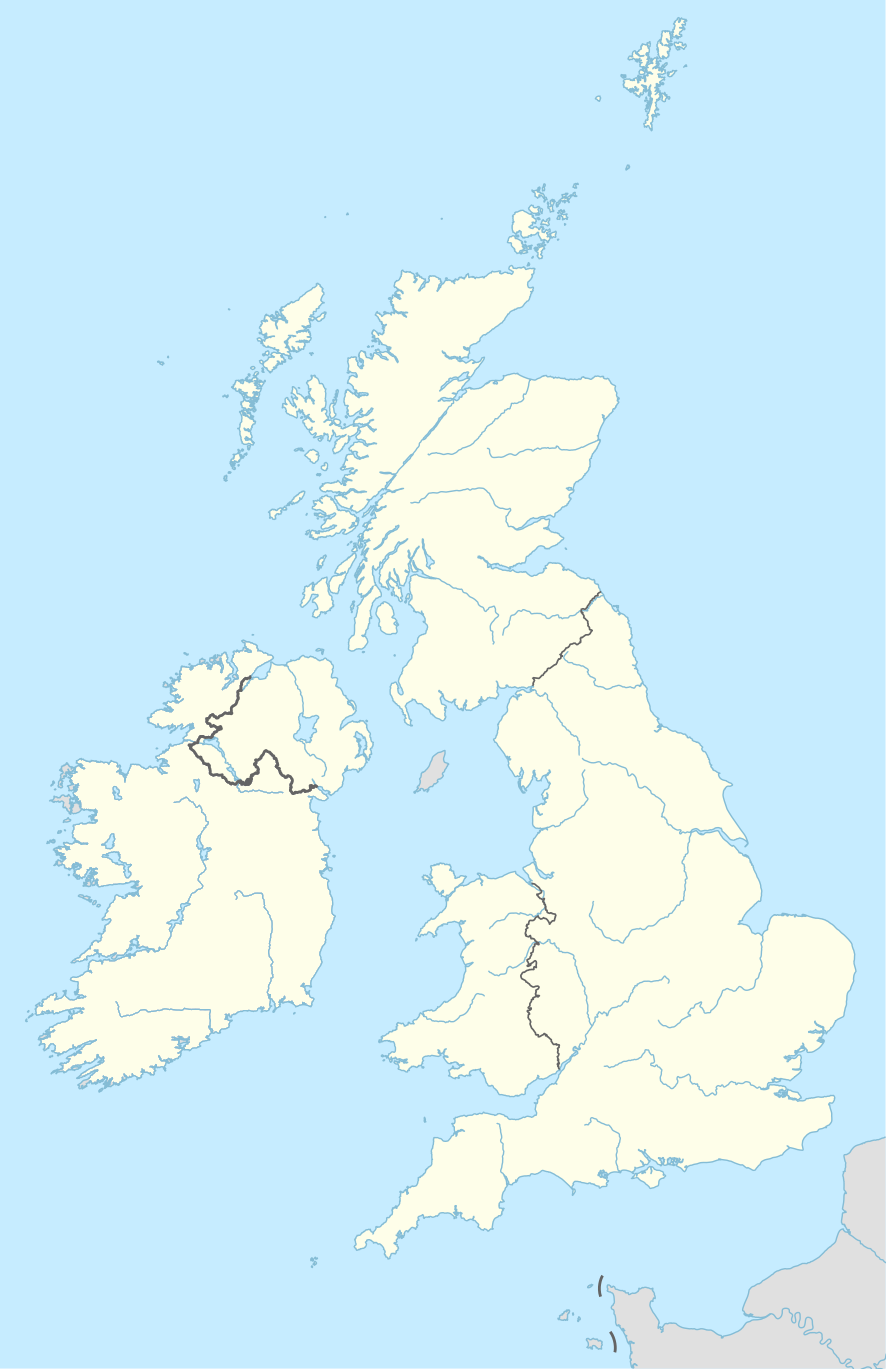
Locations of the 2021 NHL Division 3B teams.

=== Division 3B Table ===
Division champions, promoted to Division 3A

| Team | Pld | W | D | L | F | A | Diff | Pts |
|---|---|---|---|---|---|---|---|---|
| Louth | 3 | 3 | 0 | 0 | 4-51 | 4-39 | 12 | 6 |
| Cavan | 3 | 1 | 1 | 1 | 4-51 | 3-52 | 2 | 3 |
| Fermanagh | 3 | 1 | 1 | 1 | 3-50 | 5-46 | -2 | 3 |
| Leitrim | 3 | 0 | 0 | 3 | 4-40 | 3-55 | -12 | 0 |

- Lancashire did not compete in 2021 due to the impact of the COVID-19 pandemic on Gaelic games. They returned to Division 3B in 2022.

=== Division 3B Rounds 1 to 3 ===
==== Division 3B Round 1 ====
| 16 May 2021; Round 1 | Cavan | 1-19 - 2-16 | Fermanagh | Kingspan Breffni Park |

| 16 May 2021; Round 1 | Leitrim | 2-12 - 1-16 | Louth | Avantcard Páirc Seán Mac Diarmada |

==== Division 3B Round 2 ====
| 23 May 2021; Round 2 | Louth | 0-19 - 2-12 | Cavan | Darver |

| 23 May 2021; Round 2 | Fermanagh | 1-19 - 1-11 | Leitrim | Brewster Park |

==== Division 3B Round 3 ====
| 6 June 2021; Round 3 | Louth | 3-16 - 0-15 | Fermanagh | Darver |

| 6 June 2021; Round 3 | Leitrim | 1-17 - 1-20 | Cavan | Avantcard Páirc Seán Mac Diarmada |
