= 1992 Croke Cup =

Irish hurling competition

- Dates: 5–26 April 1992
- Teams: 4
- Champions: St Kieran's College (11th title); Ciarán Connery (captain)
- Runners-up: St Colman's College; Kieran Begley (captain)

Tournament statistics
- Matches played: 3
- Goals scored: 9 (3 per match)
- Points scored: 46 (15.33 per match)
- Top scorer(s): Tom Kavanagh (2-01); Ciarán Muldowney (1-04)

The 1992 Croke Cup was the 41st staging of the Croke Cup since its establishment by the Gaelic Athletic Association in 1944. The competition ran from 5 April to 26 April 1992.

St Flannan's College were the defending champions, however, they were beaten by St Colman's College in the Harty Cup final. Representatives from the Ulster Championship contested the All-Ireland series for the first time in 25 years.

The final was played on 26 April 1992 at Semple Stadium in Thurles, between St Kieran's College and St Colman's College, in what was their second meeting in the final overall and a first meeting in 15 years. St Kieran's College won the match by 1–07 to 0–08 to claim a record-equalling 11th Croke Cup title overall and a first title in two years.

== Qualification ==
Province	Champions
Connacht	St. Raphael's College
Leinster	St Kieran's College
Munster	St Colman's College
Ulster	St Patrick's College

== Results ==
=== Semi-finals ===
5 April 1992 Semi-final	St Colman's College	1-12 - 0-03	St Patrick's College	St Loman's Park
	W Hegarty 1-2, A Kenny 0-3, K Begley 0-2, I Lynch 0-1, A O'Brien 0-1, S Cotter 0-1, P O'Connor 0-1, K Morrison 0-1.		P McCormick 0-1, M McCormick 0-1, M Collins 0-1.

12 April 1992 Semi-final	St Kieran's College	4-13 - 3-03	St Raphael's College	O'Connor Park
	R Dalton 1-2, J Hanrahan 1-1, C Muldowney 0-4, C Connery 1-0, M Owens 1-0, L Smith 0-2, P Barry 0-2, C Kenny 0-1, R Kelly 0-1.		T Kavanagh 2-1, J Flanagan 1-2.

=== Final ===
26 April 1992 Final	St Kieran's College	1-07 - 0-08	St Colman's College	Semple Stadium
	C Muldowney 1-0, L Smith 0-2, C Kenny 0-2, J Philpott 0-1, J Hanrahan 0-1, K Hughes 0-1.		P O'Connor 0-2, A Kenny 0-2, T Slattery 0-1, W Hegarty 0-1, K Morrison 0-1, A O'Brien 0-1.

== Statistics ==
=== Top scorers ===
Overall

Rank	Player	County	Tally	Total	Matches	Average
1	Tom Kavanagh	St Raphael's College	2-01	7	1	7.00
1	Ciarán Muldowney	St Kieran's College	1-04	7	2	3.50
3	Willie Hegarty	St Colman's College	1-03	6	2	3.00
4	Brendan Dalton	St Kieran's College	1-02	5	2	2.50
4	Justin Hanrahan	St Kieran's College	1-02	5	2	2.50
4	Aidan Kenny	St Colman's College	0-05	5	2	2.50
