= 2009 Croke Cup =

Hurling competition

- Dates: 21 March – 13 April 2009
- Teams: 5
- Champions: Thurles CBS (1st title); James Barry (captain)
- Runners-up: Good Counsel College; Ian Duggan (captain)

Tournament statistics
- Matches played: 4
- Goals scored: 7 (1.75 per match)
- Points scored: 98 (24.5 per match)
- Top scorer(s): Michael O'Brien (2-07)

The 2009 Croke Cup was the 58th staging of the Croke Cup since its establishment by the Gaelic Athletic Association in 1944. The competition ran from 21 March to 13 April 2009.

De La Salle College Waterford were the defending champions, however, they were beaten by Blackwater Community School in the Harty Cup quarter-final.

The final was played on 13 April 2009 at Semple Stadium in Thurles, between Thurles CBS and Good Counsel College, in what was their first ever meeting in the final. Thurles CBS won the match by 1–17 to 1–15 to claim their first ever Croke Cup title.

Michael O'Brien was the top scorer with 2-07.

== Results ==
=== Quarter-final ===
21 March 2009 Quarter-final	Castlecomer Community School	2-09 - 1-09	St Caimin's Community School	MacDonagh Park
	C Dwyer 1-3, D Dunne 1-1, C Maher 0-4, M Dwyer 0-1.		P Collins 0-4, T Crowe 1-0, A Cunningham 0-2, A Mulready 0-1, J Guilfoyle 0-1, K Lynch 0-1.	Referee: N Cosgrave (Tipperary)

=== Semi-finals ===
28 March 2009 Semi-final	Good Counsel College	1-12 - 0-11	Gort Community School	Páirc Shíleáin
	J Cassin 0-5, D Murphy 1-1, G Aylward 0-4, W Walsh 0-1, M Crowdle 0-1.		R Cummins 0-4, C Cooney 0-3, K Higgins 0-2, P O'Connor 0-1, J Regan 0-1.	Referee: P Casey (Waterford)

28 March 2009 Semi-final	Castlecomer Community School	0-09 - 1-16	Thurles CBS	Nowlan Park
	C Maher 0-4, T Breen 0-3, C Callinan 0-1, C Dwyer 0-1.		M O'Brien 1-2, K Morris 0-5, A McCormack 0-3, J O'Neill 0-3, D Maher 0-1, D Butler 0-1, P Ralph 0-1.	Referee: J Owens (Wexford)

=== Final ===
13 April 2009 Final	Thurles CBS	1-17 - 1-15	Good Counsel College	Semple Stadium
	M O'Brien (1-5), J O'Neill (0-3); D Fogarty (0-3), K Morris (0-3, 1 '65), D Butler (0-1), D Maher (0-1 free), J Meagher (0-1).		J Cassin (0-7, 5 frees, 1 '65), W Walsh (1-0), G Aylward (0-3, 1 free); M Crowdle (0-1), I Duggan (0-1), A Nolan (0-1), M O'Hanlon (0-1), D Murphy (0-1).	Referee: A Kelly (Galway)

== Statistics ==
=== Top scorers ===
Overall

Rank	Player	County	Tally	Total	Matches	Average
1	Michael O'Brien	Thurles CBS	2-07	13	2	6.50
2	James Cassin	Good Counsel College	0-12	12	2	6.00
3	Kieran Morris	Thurles CBS	0-08	8	2	4.00
3	Canice Maher	Castlecomer CS	0-08	8	2	4.00
5	Charles Dwyer	Castlecomer CS	1-04	7	2	3.50
5	Ger Aylward	Castlecomer CS	1-04	7	2	3.50
