= 2005 Croke Cup =

Irish hurling competition

- Teams: 5
- Champions: St Flannan's College (14th title); James McInerney (captain); Jamesie O'Connor (manager)
- Runners-up: St Kieran's College; Maurice Nolan (captain)

Tournament statistics
- Matches played: 4
- Top scorer(s): Colin Ryan (0-14)

The 2005 Croke Cup was the 54th staging of the Croke Cup since its establishment by the Gaelic Athletic Association in 1944.

St Kieran's College were the defending champions. The introduction of a "back door system" allowed the defeated Leinster and Munster finalists entry into the All-Ireland series for the first time.

The final was played on 2 May 2005 at Semple Stadium in Thurles, between St Flannan's College and St Kieran's College, in what was their 10th meeting in the final overall and a first meeting in the final in five years. St Flannan's College won the match by 2–15 to 2–12 to claim their 14th Croke Cup title overall and a first title in six years. It remains their last All-Ireland title.

== Results ==
=== Semi-finals ===
9 April 2005 Semi-final	St Kieran's College	5-14 - 2-09	Thurles CBS	MacDonagh Park
	P Hogan 2-2 (1-0 pen), R Hogan 1-4 (1f), TJ Reid 1-3, Martin Walsh 1-0, M Nolan 0-3 (2f), Mark Walsh, JJ Farrell 0-1 each.	Report	C Clohessy 2-0, P Burke 0-2 (1f), B Moran 0-3 (2f) M Cahill 0-1 (f), T Hammersley 0-2, T Hassett, M Cahill (f) 0-1 each.	Referee: S Sexton (Limerick)

9 April 2005 Semi-final	St Flannan's College	2-13 - 1-14	St Brendan's Community School	MacDonagh Park
	C Ryan 0-7 (3f, 1 65), I Colleran 1-2, A Arthur 1-1, C Coughlan (f), B Gaffney, J Neylon 0-1 each.	Report	J Bergin 0-3 (3f), P Cleary 1-0, D Horan, B Nolan, D Masterson, Mark Mulrooney 0-2 each, C Coughlan 0-2 (1f, 65), R Carroll 0-1.	Referee: B White (Wexford)

=== Final ===
2 May 2005 Final	St Flannan's College	2-15 - 2-12	St Kieran's College	Semple Stadium
	C Ryan (0-7, 5f, 2 '65), B Gaffney 1-3, N Killeen 1-0, J McInerney 0-2 (1f), G Arthur 0-2, D O'Halloran 0-1.	Report	R Hogan 1-3 (2f), M Nolan 0-5 (4f), P Hogan 1-1, TJ Reid 0-2, J Farrell 0-1.	Referee: N Cosgrove (Tipperary)
