= 2006 Croke Cup =

Irish hurling competition

- Dates: 25 March – 2 May 2006
- Teams: 5
- Champions: Dublin Colleges (14th title); Conor Connolly (captain); Vinny Teehan (manager)
- Runners-up: St Flannan's College; Colm Madden (captain); Jamesie O'Connor (manager)

Tournament statistics
- Matches played: 4
- Goals scored: 4 (1 per match)
- Points scored: 97 (24.25 per match)
- Top scorer(s): Conor Tierney (1-10)

The 2006 Croke Cup was the 55th staging of the Croke Cup since its establishment by the Gaelic Athletic Association in 1944. The competition ran from 25 March to 2 May 2006.

St Flannan's College were the defending champions.

The final was played on 1 May 2006 at Dr Cullen Park in Carlow, between Dublin Colleges and St Flannan's, in what was their first ever meeting in the final. Dublin Colleges won the match by 1–11 to 0–11 to claim their first ever Croke Cup title.

Conor Tierney was the top scorer with 1-10.

== Results ==
=== Quarter-final ===
| 25 March 2006 Quarter-final | St Flannan's College | 1-16 - 0-12 | Gort Community School | MacDonagh Park |
| | C Tierney 1-4, C Madden 0-3, C Nealon 0-2, D Stack 0-2, D Ryan 0-2, R Horan 0-1, B Coffey 0-1, F O'Reilly 0-1. | | J Hannelly 0-9, D Callanan 0-1, J Moylan 0-1, A Harte 0-1. | Referee: D Conroy (Kilkenny) |

=== Semi-finals ===
| 1 April 2006 Semi-final | Dublin Colleges | 1-13 - 0-10 | Midleton CBS | Nowlan Park |
| | P Ryan 1-0, R O'Carroll 0-3, J Maher 0-3 (0-1 free, 0-1 65), S Murphy 0-2 (0-1 free 0-1 65), J Cooper 0-2, C McBride, S O'Rourke, D Kelly 0-1 each. | Report | R White 0-7 (0-5 frees), B Lawton, E O'Keeffe, E Walsh 0-1 each. | Referee: M Haverty (Galway) |

| 2 April 2006 Semi-final | St Flannan's College | 1-11 - 0-13 | Kilkenny CBS | MacDonagh Park |
| | C Madden 1-0; C Nealon, J Conlon 0-3 each; C Tierney 0-2; B Coffey, D Ryan (f), R Horan 0-1 each. | Report | M Bergin 0-6 (5f, 1 '65); M Kelly, J Fitzpatrick 0-2 each; D Webster, J Comerford, A Stapleton 0-1 each. | Referee: B White (Tipperary) |

=== Final ===
| 2 May 2005 Final | Dublin Colleges | 1-11 - 0-11 | St Flannan's College | Dr Cullen Park |
| | P Ryan 0-6 (5f), C McBride 1-0, J Maher 0-2, D Connolly, R O'Carroll, J Cooper 0-1 each. | Report | C Tierney 0-4 (4f), C Nealon 0-2, C O'Doherty 0-2 (2f), J Conlon, D Stack and C Madden 0-1 each. | Referee: D Murphy (Wexford) |

== Statistics ==
=== Top scorers ===
Overall

| Rank | Player | County | Tally | Total | Matches | Average |
|---|---|---|---|---|---|---|
| 1 | Conor Tierney | St Flannan's College | 1-10 | 13 | 3 | 4.33 |
| 2 | Paul Ryan | Dublin Colleges | 1-06 | 9 | 2 | 4.50 |
| 2 | Jerry Hannelly | Gort Community School | 0-09 | 9 | 1 | 9.00 |
| 4 | Colm Madden | St Flannan's College | 1-04 | 7 | 3 | 2.33 |
| 4 | Conor Nealon | St Flannan's College | 0-07 | 7 | 3 | 2.33 |
| 4 | Robert White | Midleton CBS | 0-07 | 7 | 1 | 7.00 |
