= 2007 Croke Cup =

Irish hurling competition

- Dates: 24 March - 22 April 2007
- Teams: 5
- Champions: DLS College Waterford (1st title); David O'Sullivan (captain); Craig Moloney (captain)
- Runners-up: Kilkenny CBS; Mark Bergin (captain)

Tournament statistics
- Matches played: 4
- Goals scored: 9 (2.25 per match)
- Points scored: 91 (22.75 per match)
- Top scorer(s): Mark Bergin (0-24)

The 2007 Croke Cup was the 56th staging of the Croke Cup since its establishment by the Gaelic Athletic Association in 1944. The competition ran from 24 March to 22 April 2007.

Dublin Colleges were the defending champions, however, they were beaten by Kilkenny CBS in the Leinster Championship quarter-final.

The final was played on 22 April 2007 at Croke Park in Dublin, between De La Salle College Waterford and Kilkenny CBS, in what was their first ever meeting in the final. De La Salle College Waterford won the match by 0–13 to 1–09 to claim their first ever Croke Cup title.

Mark Bergin was the top scorer with 0-24.

== Results ==
=== Quarter-final ===
24 March 2007 Quarter-final	Kilkenny CBS	2-12 - 1-14	St Flannan's College	MacDonagh Park
	M Bergin 0-6, S Maher 1-2, P Guinan 1-0, A Stapleton 0-2, J Fitzpatrick 0-1, L Ryan 0-1.		J Conlon 0-10, D Russell 1-0, I White 0-2, E Callinan 0-1, M Barry 0-1.	Referee: J Ryan (Tipperary)

=== Semi-finals ===
29 March 2007 Semi-final	DLS College Waterford	3-06 - 1-07 (aet)	Castlecomer Community School	O'Kennedy Park
	S Power 2-5, W Walsh 1-0, A Brophy 0-1.		A Ruth 1-0, C McGrath 0-2, P Boran 0-2, T Breen 0-1, C Maher 0-1, B Dillon 0-1.	Referee: D Murphy (Wexford)

31 March 2007 Semi-final	Kilkenny CBS	0-19 - 1-11	Gort Community School	St Brendan's Park
	M Bergin 0-13 (0-10f), A Stapleton 0-4, S Maher, P Guinan 0-1 each.	Report	K Killea 1-2, S Coen 0-4, A Harte (0-1f), G Hennelly 0-2 each, K Helebert 0-1 (f).	Referee: J O'Mahony (Limerick)

=== Final ===
22 April 2007 Final	DLS College Waterford	0-13 - 1-09	Kilkenny CBS	Croke Park
	S Power 0-9 (6f, 2 '65'), W Walsh 0-2, C Maloney, P McCarthy 0-1 each.	Report	M Bergin 0-5 (3f), A Stapleton 1-2, M Kelly 0-2.	Referee: M Haverty (Galway)

== Statistics ==
=== Top scorers ===
Overall

Rank	Player	County	Tally	Total	Matches	Average
1	Mark Bergin	Kilkenny CBS	0-24	24	3	8.00
2	Stephen Power	DLS College	2-14	20	2	10.00
3	Adrian Stapleton	Kilkenny CBS	1-08	11	3	3.66
4	John Conlon	St Flannan's College	0-10	10	1	10.00
5	Shane Maher	Kilkenny CBS	1-03	6	3	2.00
