= 1994 Croke Cup =

Irish hurling competition

- Dates: 17–24 April 1994
- Teams: 4
- Champions: North Monastery (5th title); Brian Hurley (captain)
- Runners-up: St Mary's College; Brian Carr (captain)

Tournament statistics
- Matches played: 3
- Goals scored: 7 (2.33 per match)
- Points scored: 68 (22.67 per match)
- Top scorer(s): Kevin Egan (1-07); Dara Burke (1-07)

The 1994 Croke Cup was the 43rd staging of the Croke Cup since its establishment by the Gaelic Athletic Association in 1944. The competition ran from 17 April to 24 April 1994.

St Kieran's College were the defending champions, however, they were beaten by St Mary's College in the All-Ireland semi-final.

The final was played on 24 April 1994 at MacDonagh Park in Nenagh, between the North Monastery and St Mary's College, in what was their first ever meeting in the final. The North Monastery won the match by 1–10 to 1–06 to claim their fifth Croke Cup title overall and a first title in nine years. It remains their last Croke Cup title.

Kevin Egan and Dara Burke were the top scorers with 1-07 each.

== Qualification ==
| Province | Champions |
|---|---|
| Connacht | St Mary's College |
| Leinster | St Kieran's College |
| Munster | North Monastery |
| Ulster | Cross & Passion College |

== Results ==
=== Semi-finals ===
| 17 April 1994 Semi-final | North Monastery | 1-16 - 0-07 | Cross & Passion College | MacDonagh Park |
| | M Daly 1-2, D O'Sullivan 0-5, K Egan 0-4, P Ryan 0-4, A Coughlan 0-1. | | A McCloskey 0-2, C McCaughan 0-2, J McKay 0-2, D Connolly 0-1. |

| 17 April 1994 Semi-final | St Mary's College | 3-13 - 1-16 | St Kieran's College | St Brendan's Park |
| | D Burke 1-5, A Kerins 0-6, P Ryan 1-0, D Fahy 1-0, B O'Donnell 0-1, L Keane 0-1. | | PJ Cody 0-8, M Connolly 1-0, D Dalton 0-3, B Kelly 0-2, M Phelan 0-1, D Duggan 0-1, E Behan 0-1. |

=== Final ===
| 24 April 1994 Final | North Monastery | 1-10 - 1-06 | St Mary's College | MacDonagh Park |
| | K Egan 1-3, D O'Sullivan 0-3, G Shaw 0-1, S Óg Ó hAilpín 0-1, P Ryan 0-1, A Coughlan 0-1. | | B O'Donnell 1-0, D Burke 0-2, D Fahy 0-2, P Ryan 0-1, A Kerins 0-1. | Referee: P Delaney (Laois) |

== Statistics ==
=== Top scorers ===
Overall

| Rank | Player | County | Tally | Total | Matches | Average |
|---|---|---|---|---|---|---|
| 1 | Kevin Egan | North Monastery | 1-07 | 10 | 2 | 5.00 |
| 1 | Dara Burke | St Mary's College | 1-07 | 10 | 2 | 5.00 |
| 3 | Damien O'Sullivan | North Monastery | 0-08 | 8 | 2 | 4.00 |
| 3 | P. J. Cody | St Kieran's College | 0-08 | 8 | 2 | 4.00 |
| 5 | Alan Kerins | St Mary's College | 0-07 | 7 | 2 | 3.50 |
