= 1979 Croke Cup =

Irish hurling competition

- Dates: 31 March - 29 April 1979
- Teams: 3
- Champions: St Flannan's College (7th title); Gerry McInerney (captain); Séamus Gardiner (manager)
- Runners-up: Presentation College, Birr; Joe Verney (captain); Brother Denis (manager)

Tournament statistics
- Matches played: 2
- Goals scored: 10 (5 per match)
- Points scored: 34 (17 per match)
- Top scorer(s): Tom Howard (2-06)

The 1979 Croke Cup was the 28th staging of the Croke Cup since its establishment by the Gaelic Athletic Association in 1944. The competition ran from 31 March to 29 April 1979.

Templemore CBS were the defending champions, however, they were beaten by St Flannan's College in the Harty Cup semi-final.

The final was played on 29 April 1979 at Semple Stadium in Thurles, between St Flannan's College and Presentation College, Birr, in what was their first ever meeting in the final. St Flannan's College won the match by 3–15 to 2–03 to claim a record-equalling seventh Croke Cup title and a first title in three years.

Tom Howard was the top scorer with 2-06.

== Qualification ==
Province	Champions
Connacht	St Mary's College
Leinster	Presentation College, Birr
Munster	St Flannan's College

== Results ==
=== Semi-final ===
31 March 1979 Semi-final	St Flannan's College	4-15 - 1-01	St Mary's College	MacDonagh Park
	R Colleran 2-3, P Colleran 1-2, T Howard 0-5, J Morey 1-0, G Corry 0-3, G McInerney 0-1, M O'Grady 0-1.		P Burke 1-0, G Kilcommins 0-1.

=== Final ===
29 April 1979 Final	St Flannan's College	3-15 - 2-03	Presentation College, Birr	Semple Stadium
	T Howard 2-1, G McInerney 0-7, M O'Grady 1-0, R Colleran 0-2, P Colleran 0-2, S McMahon 0-1, G Corry 0-1.		J Verney 1-0, A Rosney 1-0, P Corrigan 0-2, J McLoughlin 0-1.

== Statistics ==
=== Top scorers ===
Overall

Rank	Player	County	Tally	Total	Matches	Average
1	Tom Howard	St Flannan's College	2-06	12	2	6.00
2	Ray Colleran	St Flannan's College	2-05	11	2	5.50
3	Gerry McInerney	St Flannan's College	0-08	8	2	4.00
