= Ray Sampson (hurler) =

Irish hurler

Personal information
- Native name: Réamann Samsún (Irish)
- Born: 1965 (age 60–61) Knocklong, County Limerick, Ireland
- Occupation: Business owner

Sport
- Sport: Hurling
- Position: Centre-forward
Clubs
- Years: Club
- Garryspillane; Limerick Club, New York
Club titles
- New York titles: 2
Inter-county*
Years	County	Apps (scores)
1984-1993	Limerick	10 (2-06)
Inter-county titles
- Munster titles: 0
- All-Irelands: 0
- NHL: 2
- All Stars: 0
- *Inter County team apps and scores correct as of 16:58, 9 December 2021.

Raymond Sampson (born 1965) is an Irish former hurler who played at club level with Garryspillane and at inter-county level with the Limerick senior hurling team. He usually lined out as a forward.

== Career ==
Sampson first came to prominence as a hurler at juvenile and underage levels with the Garryspillane club before eventually progressing onto the club's top adult team. During his club career he claimed championship medals in the junior and intermediate grades, while he also won two senior titles with the Limerick Club in New York. Sampson also represented the St. Flannan's College team in his youth and won consecutive All-Ireland Colleges Championship titles in 1982 and 1983, having earlier won consecutive Harty Cup titles. He first appeared on the inter-county scene as a member of the Limerick minor hurling team in 1983, before winning a Munster Under-21 Championship title in 1986. Sampson was a regular with the Limerick senior team for almost a decade, during which time he won two National Hurling League titles.

== Honours ==
St. Flannan's College

- Dr. Croke Cup: 1982, 1983 (c)
- Dr. Harty Cup: 1982, 1983 (c)

Garryspillane

- Limerick Intermediate Hurling Championship: 1990, 1996
- Limerick Junior Hurling Championship: 1984

Limerick Club, New York

- New York Senior Hurling Championship: 1994, 1995

Limerick

- National Hurling League: 1984-85, 1991-92
- Munster Under-21 Hurling Championship: 1986
