= 2001 Croke Cup =

Irish hurling competition

- Dates: 8 April - 5 May 2001
- Teams: 3
- Champions: St Colman's College (3rd title); Brian Carey (captain)
- Runners-up: Gort Community School; Conor Crotty (captain)

Tournament statistics
- Matches played: 2
- Goals scored: 7 (3.5 per match)
- Points scored: 29 (14.5 per match)
- Top scorer(s): Andrew O'Shaughnessy (3-11)

The 2001 Croke Cup was the 50th staging of the Croke Cup since its establishment by the Gaelic Athletic Association in 1944. The competition ran from 8 April to 5 May 2001.

St Kieran's College were the defending champions, however, they were beaten by Dublin Colleges in the Leinster semi-final.

The final was played on 5 May 2001 at Croke Park in Dublin, between St Colman's College and Gort Community School, in what was their first ever meeting in the final. St Colman's College won the match by 2–10 to 2–07 to claim their third Croke Cup title overall and a first title in four years.

Andrew O'Shaughnessy was the top scorer with 3-11.

== Qualification ==
| Province | Champions |
|---|---|
| Connacht | Gort Community School |
| Leinster | Dublin Colleges |
| Munster | St Colman's College |

== Results ==
=== Semi-final ===
| 8 April 2001 Semi-final | St Colman's College | 2-07 - 1-05 | Dublin Colleges | Clonmel GAA Ground |
| | A O'Shaughnessy 1-3, B Carey 1-1, D Fitzgerald 0-2, S Kearney 0-1. | | J Twomey 1-0, C Keaney 0-2, S Quinn 0-1, S Hiney 0-1, S Fee 0-1. | Referee: M Bodkin (Galway) |

=== Final ===
| 5 May 2001 Final | St Colman's College | 2-10 - 2-07 | Gort Community School | Croke Park |
| | A O'Shaughnessy 2-8 (7f), P Kearney, D Fitzgerald 0-1 each. | Report | J Gantley 1-1, J O'Leary 1-0, S Kavanagh 0-2 (2f), C Forde, D Green (1f), T Lee, C Connoly 0-1. |
