= 1999 Croke Cup =

Irish hurling competition

- Dates: 27 March - 18 April 1999
- Teams: 4
- Champions: St Flannan's College (13th title); Dermot Gleeson (captain)
- Runners-up: St Kieran's College; Hugh Gannon (captain)

Tournament statistics
- Matches played: 3
- Goals scored: 9 (3 per match)
- Points scored: 76 (25.33 per match)
- Top scorer(s): Eoin Kelly (2-15)

The 1999 Croke Cup was the 48th staging of the Croke Cup since its establishment by the Gaelic Athletic Association in 1944. The competition ran from 27 March to 18 April 1999.

St Flannan's College were the defending champions. A combined Ulster Colleges team, made up of players from various colleges in the province, represented Ulster in the All-Ireland series.

The final was played on 18 April 1999 at Croke Park in Dublin, between St Flannan's College and St Kieran's College, in what was their eighth meeting in the final overall and a first meeting in eight years. St Flannan's College won the match by 2–15 to 2–10 to claim their 13th Croke Cup title overall and a second title in succession.

Eoin Kelly was the top scorer with 2-15.

== Qualification ==
Province	Champions
Connacht	Gort Community School
Leinster	St Kieran's College
Munster	St Flannan's College
Ulster	Ulster Colleges

== Results ==
=== Semi-finals ===
27 March 1999 Semi-final	St Flannan's College	2-16 - 0-10	Gort Community School	MacDonagh Park
	A Quinn 1-5, B Gantley 0-4, R Conlon 1-0, T Griffin 0-3, T Carmody 0-2, B Dunne 0-1, D Kennedy 0-1.		S Coen 0-4, D Greene 0-3, B Fitzsimons 0-1, A Diviney 0-1, C Brennan 0-1.	Referee: P Horan (Offaly)

28 March 1999 Semi-final	St Kieran's College	3-19 - 0-06	Ulster Colleges	Parnell Park
	E Kelly 1-8, B Carroll 0-6, D Dowling 1-1, S Hennessy 1-0, P Reid 0-3, G Whelan 0-1.		K O'Connell 0-3, P Kirk 0-1, C Herron 0-1, S McGourty 0-1.	Referee: A Mac Suibhne (Dublin)

=== Final ===
18 April 1999 Final	St Flannan's College	2-15 - 2-10	St Kieran's College	Croke Park
	A Quinn 1-7 (0-6 fs); B Dunne 0-3, T Carmody 1-0; B Gantley, G Quinn 0-2 each; D Kennedy 0-1.	Report	E Kelly 1-7 (0-4 fs); B Carroll 0-3, P Reid 1-0.	Referee: P Horan (Offaly)

== Statistics ==
=== Top scorers ===
Overall

Rank	Player	County	Tally	Total	Matches	Average
1	Eoin Kelly	St Kieran's College	2-15	21	2	10.50
2	Andrew Quinn	St Flannan's College	2-12	18	2	9.00
3	Brian Carroll	St Kieran's College	0-09	9	2	4.50
4	Patrick Reid	St Kieran's College	1-03	6	2	3.00
4	Brendan Gantley	St Flannan's College	0-06	6	2	3.00
