= 2000 Croke Cup =

Irish hurling competition

- Dates: 2–16 April 2000
- Teams: 3
- Champions: St Kieran's College (14th title); Tim Murphy (captain)
- Runners-up: St Flannan's College; Ronan O'Looney (captain)

Tournament statistics
- Matches played: 2
- Goals scored: 3 (1.5 per match)
- Points scored: 44 (22 per match)
- Top scorer(s): Eoin Kelly (0-13)

The 2000 Croke Cup was the 49th staging of the Croke Cup since its establishment by the Gaelic Athletic Association in 1944. The competition ran from 2 April to 16 April 2000.

St Flannan's College were the defending champions.

The final was played on 16 April 2000 at MacDonagh Park in Nenagh, between St Kieran's College and St Flannan's College, in what was their ninth meeting in the final overall and a second consecutive meeting. St Kieran's College won the match by 1–10 to 0–09 to claim a record-breaking 14th Croke Cup title overall and a first title in four years.

Eoin Kelly was the top scorer with 0-13.

== Qualification ==
Province	Champions
Connacht	Gort Community School
Leinster	St Kieran's College
Munster	St Flannan's College

== Results ==
=== Semi-finals ===
2 April 2000 Semi-final	St Kieran's College	2-14 - 0-11	Gort Community School	MacDonagh Park
	B Carroll 1-6 (1f), E Kelly 0-6 (2f), L Heffernan 1-0, S O'Neill 0-1, P Reid 0-1.	Report	A Diviney 0-5 (4f), P Mahony 0-3, B Coen 0-2 (2f), S Carey 0-1.	Referee: J McDonnell (Tipperary)

=== Final ===
16 April 2000 Final	St Kieran's College	1-10 - 0-09	St Flannan's College	MacDonagh Park
	E Kelly 0-7, L Heffernan 1-1, S O'Neill 0-1, T Murphy 0-1.		A Quinn 0-5, D Kennedy 0-2, B Gantley 0-1, J Culkin 0-1.	Referee: J McDonnell (Tipperary)

== Statistics ==
=== Top scorers ===
Overall

Rank	Player	County	Tally	Total	Matches	Average
1	Eoin Kelly	St Kieran's College	0-13	13	2	6.50
2	Brian Carroll	St Kieran's College	1-06	9	2	4.50
3	Liam Heffernan	St Kieran's College	2-01	7	2	3.50
4	Andrew Quinn	St Flannan's College	0-05	5	1	5.00
4	Adrian Diviney	Gort Community School	0-05	5	1	5.00
