= 1967 Croke Cup =

Irish hurling competition

- Dates: 9 April - 7 May 1967
- Teams: 4
- Champions: St Peter's College (2nd title); Paddy Bernie (captain)
- Runners-up: Limerick CBS; Matt Grace (captain)

Tournament statistics
- Matches played: 4
- Goals scored: 33 (8.25 per match)
- Points scored: 71 (17.75 per match)
- Top scorer(s): Richard Grace (4-14)

The 1967 Croke Cup was the 16th staging of the Croke Cup since its establishment by the Gaelic Athletic Association in 1944. The competition ran from 9 April to 7 May 1967.

Limerick CBS were the defending champions.

The final, a replay, was played on 7 May 1967 at Croke Park in Dublin, between St Peter's College and Limerick CBS, in what was their first ever meeting in the final. St Peter's College won the match by 5–11 to 3–06 to claim their second Croke Cup title overall and a first title in five years.

Richard Grace was the top scorer with 4-14.

== Qualification ==
Province	Champions
Connacht	St Mary's College
Leinster	St Peter's College
Munster	Limerick CBS
Ulster	St Mary's CBGS

== Results ==
=== Semi-final ===
9 April 1967 Semi-final	St Peter's College	7-12 - 1-03	St Mary's CBGS	Croke Park
	P Murphy 3-1, T Royce 1-4, J Murphy 2-0, J Murphy 1-0, M Casey 0-3, P Bernie 0-2, M Quigley 0-2.		B Rice 1-0, A Hamill 0-2, K Carson 0-1.

9 April 1967 Semi-final	Limerick CBS	5-09 - 2-04	St Mary's College	MacDonagh Park
	M Grace 2-1, R Grace 1-4, S Burke 1-1, W O'Connor 1-1, G McKeown 0-2.		J Hanniffy 2-0, M O'Connell 0-2, J Rabbitte 0-1, C O'Malley 0-1.

=== Final ===
23 April 1967 Final	St Peter's College	5-13 - 5-13	Limerick CBS	O'Moore Park
	T Royce 2-1, P Bernie 1-4, L O'Loughlin 1-1, M Quigley 1-1, P Murphy 0-4, M Casey 0-1, J Quigley 0-1.		R Grace 2-6, W O'Connor 1-2, M Grace 1-1, S Burke 1-0, C Cregan 0-1, S Condon 0-1, M Hanley 0-1, P McCarthy 0-1.

7 May 1967 Final replay	St Peter's College	5-11 - 3-06	Limerick CBS	Croke Park
	T Royce 1-4, P Murphy 1-1, J Murphy 1-1, P Bernie 0-4, M Quigley 1-0, L O'Loughlin 1-0, M Casey 0-1.		R Grace 1-4, M Grace 1-0, S Condon 1-0, P McCarthy 0-1, W O'Connor 0-1.

== Statistics ==
=== Top scorers ===
Overall

Rank	Player	County	Tally	Total	Matches	Average
1	Richard Grace	Limerick CBS	4-14	26	3	8.33
2	Tom Royce	St Peter's College	4-09	21	3	7.00
3	Peter Murphy	St Peter's College	4-06	18	3	6.00
4	Matt Grace	Limerick CBS	4-02	14	3	4.66
5	Paddy Bernie	St Peter's College	1-10	13	3	4.33
