= 1970 Croke Cup =

Irish hurling competition

- Dates: 22 March - 26 April 1970
- Teams: 3
- Champions: North Monastery (2nd title); Des O'Grady (captain)
- Runners-up: Kilkenny CBS; Ger Burke (captain)

Tournament statistics
- Matches played: 2
- Goals scored: 8 (4 per match)
- Points scored: 37 (18.5 per match)
- Top scorer(s): Gerald Hanley (2-02)

The 1970 Croke Cup was the 19th staging of the Croke Cup since its establishment by the Gaelic Athletic Association in 1944. The competition ran from 22 March to 26 April 1970.

St Finbarr's College were the defending champions, however, they were beaten ny Limerick CBS in the Harty Cup first round. Teams were reduced to 13-a-side.

The final was played on 26 April 1970 at Fraher Field in Dungarvan, between the North Monastery and Kilkenny CBS, in what was their first ever meeting in the final. The North Monastery won the match by 2–13 to 2–08 to claim their second Croke Cup title overall and a first title in 10 years.

Gerald Hanley was the top scorer with 2-02.

== Qualification ==
Province	Champions
Connacht	Presentation College
Leinster	Kilkenny CBS
Munster	North Monastery

== Results ==
=== Semi-final ===
22 March 1970 Semi-final	Kilkenny CBS	3-07 - 1-09	Presentation College	St Brendan's Park
	J Giles 1-1, R Dunne 1-0, B Young 1-0, T Neary 0-3, B O'Brien 0-1, G Burke 0-1.		M Donoghue 1-3, F Burke 0-2, G Corley 0-2, G Holland 0-1, P Flannery 0-1.	Referee: M Spain (Offaly)

=== Final ===
26 April 1970 Final	North Monastery	2-13 - 2-08	Kilkenny CBS	Fraher Field
	G Hanley 2-2, S Greene 0-3, M Corbett 0-3, D Sexton 0-3, F Coughlan 0-1, S O'Connell 0-1.		W Young 1-1, T Gaffney 1-0, T Neary 0-2, J O'Brien 0-2, S McGarry 0-1, T O'Brien 0-1, J Giles 0-1.	Referee: J Moloney (Tipperary)
