= 1984 Croke Cup =

Irish hurling competition

- Dates: 15 April - 6 May 1984
- Teams: 3
- Champions: St Finbarr's College (5th title); Barry Harte (captain)
- Runners-up: St Kieran's College

Tournament statistics
- Matches played: 2
- Goals scored: 5 (2.5 per match)
- Points scored: 36 (18 per match)
- Top scorer(s): Liam Egan (1-10)

The 1984 Croke Cup was the 33rd staging of the Croke Cup since its establishment by the Gaelic Athletic Association in 1944. The competition ran from 15 April to 6 May 1984.

St Flannan's College were the defending champions, however, they were beaten by the North Monastery in the Harty Cup quarter-final.

The final was played on 6 May 1984 at Croke Park in Dublin, between St Finbarr's College and St Kieran's College, in what was their fifth meeting in the final and a first meeting in 10 years. St Finbarr's College won the match by 1–15 to 0–08 to claim their fifth Croke Cup title overall and a first title in 10 years. It would be their last Croke Cup title.

Liam Egan was the top scorer with 1-10.

== Qualification ==
| Province | Champions |
|---|---|
| Connacht | Our Lady's College |
| Leinster | St Kieran's College |
| Munster | St Finbarr's College |

== Results ==
=== Semi-final ===
| 15 April 1984 Semi-final | St Kieran's College | 3-08 - 1-05 | St Joseph's College | St Brendan's Park |
| | L Egan 1-4, E Keher 1-1, E Morrissey 1-0, T Holohan 0-2, T McCluskey 0-1. | | T O'Sullivan 1-0, J Lee 0-3, T O'Driscoll 0-1, S O'DOnoghue 0-1. |

=== Final ===
| 6 May 1984 Final | St Finbarr's College | 1-15 - 0-08 | St Kieran's College | Croke Park |
| | DJ Kiely 0-6, M Foley 1-0, A Crowley 0-3, B Harte 0-3, D Kenneally 0-1, S McSweeney 0-1, C Noonan 0-1. | | L Egan 0-6, E Keher 0-1, E Morrissey 0-1. |

== Statistics ==
=== Top scorers ===
Overall

| Rank | Player | County | Tally | Total | Matches | Average |
|---|---|---|---|---|---|---|
| 1 | Liam Egan | St Kieran's College | 1-10 | 13 | 2 | 6.50 |
| 1 | D. J. Kiely | St Finbarr's College | 0-06 | 6 | 1 | 6.00 |
| 3 | Éamonn Keher | St Kieran's College | 1-02 | 5 | 2 | 2.50 |
