= 1998 Croke Cup =

Irish hurling competition

- Dates: 5 April - 3 May 1998
- Teams: 4
- Champions: St Flannan's College (12th title); Brian Clancy (captain)
- Runners-up: St Raphael's College; Anthony Keane (captain)

Tournament statistics
- Matches played: 3
- Goals scored: 7 (2.33 per match)
- Points scored: 62 (20.67 per match)
- Top scorer(s): John Casey (0-15); Gavin Keary (1-12)

The 1998 Croke Cup was the 47th staging of the Croke Cup since its establishment by the Gaelic Athletic Association in 1944. The competition ran from 5 April to 3 May 1998.

St Colman's College were the defending champions, however, they were beaten by St Flannan's College in the Harty Cup final.

The final was played on 3 May 1998 at Croke Park in Dublin, between St Flannan's College and St Raphael's College, in what was their first ever meeting in the final. St Flannan's College won the match by 2–16 to 1–11 to claim their 12th Croke Cup title overall and a first title in seven years.

== Qualification ==
| Province | Champions |
|---|---|
| Connacht | St Raphael's College |
| Leinster | Coláiste Éamann Rís |
| Munster | St Flannan's College |
| Ulster | St Mary's CBGS |

== Results ==
=== Semi-finals ===
| 5 April 1998 Semi-final | St Raphael's College | 2-16 - 0-05 | St Mary's CBGS | Drogheda Park |
| | K Daniels 2-4, G Keary 0-9, N Kelly 0-1, A Morgan 0-1, S Morgan 0-1. | | M McCullough 0-2, P Kelly 0-1, H Kennedy 0-1, C Herron 0-1. | Referee: P Horan (Offaly) |

| 5 April 1998 Semi-final | St Flannan's College | 1-08 - 1-06 | Coláiste Éamann Rís | Semple Stadium |
| | J Casey 1-5, C O'Reilly 0-1, S Mullane 0-1, J Carmody 0-1. | | J Gormley 1-0, J O'Neill 0-2, G Cleere 0-2, C Herity 0-1, JP Corcoran 0-1. | Referee: J McDonnell (Tipperary) |

=== Final ===
| 3 May 1998 Final | St Flannan's College | 2-16 - 1-11 | St Raphael's College | Croke Park |
| | J Casey 0-7, C O'Reilly 1-2, M Greaney 1-0, G Considine 0-2, G Quinn 0-2, T Carmody 0-1, S Mullane 0-1, B Clancy 0-1. | | G Keary 0-6, K Daniels 1-1, N Kelly 0-2, A Keane 0-1, S Morgan 0-1. | Referee: A Mac Suibhne (Dublin) |

== Statistics ==
=== Top scorers ===
Overall

| Rank | Player | County | Tally | Total | Matches | Average |
|---|---|---|---|---|---|---|
| 1 | John Casey | St Flannan's College | 1-12 | 15 | 2 | 7.50 |
| 1 | Gavin Keary | St Raphael's | 0-15 | 15 | 2 | 7.50 |
| 3 | Keith Daniels | St Raphael's | 3-05 | 14 | 2 | 7.00 |
