= 1972 Croke Cup =

Irish hurling competition

- Dates: 26 March - 30 April 1972
- Teams: 3
- Champions: St Finbarr's College (6th title); Tom Fogarty (captain); Michael O'Brien (manager)
- Runners-up: St Kieran's College; Billy Fitzpatrick (captain)

Tournament statistics
- Matches played: 2
- Goals scored: 15 (7.5 per match)
- Points scored: 27 (13.5 per match)
- Top scorer(s): Joe Reidy (3-00)

The 1972 Croke Cup was the 21st staging of the Croke Cup since its establishment by the Gaelic Athletic Association in 1944. The competition ran from 26 March to 30 April 1972.

St Kieran's College were the defending champions.

The final was played on 30 April 1972 at Semple Stadium in Thurles, between St Finbarr's College and St Kieran's College, in what was their third meeting in the final and a second successive meeting in the final. St Finbarr's College won the match by 3–07 to 2–05 to claim a third Croke Cup title overall and a first title in two years.

Joe Reidy was the top scorer with 3-00.

== Qualification ==
Province	Champions
Connacht	Our Lady's College
Leinster	St Kieran's College
Munster	St Finbarr's College

== Results ==
=== Semi-final ===
26 March 1972 Semi-final	St Kieran's College	7-05 - 3-01	Our Lady's College	MacDonagh Park
	G Freaney 2-1, J Reidy 2-0, J Quane 2-0, B Fitzpatrick 1-1, B Cody 0-1, J Dunne 0-1, N Minogue 0-1.		V Mullins 1-0, E O'Connor 1-0, A Curtin 1-0, M Glynn 0-1.

=== Final ===
30 April 1972 Final	St Finbarr's College	3-07 - 2-05	St Kieran's College	Semple Stadium
	T O'Sullivan 2-1, T Murphy 1-1, T Fogarty 0-3, D Dwyer 0-2.		B Fitzpatrick 1-1, J Reidy 1-0, G Woodcock 0-2, J Dunne 0-1, B Cody 0-1.

== Statistics ==
=== Top scorers ===
Overall

Rank	Player	County	Tally	Total	Matches	Average
1	Joe Reidy	St Kieran's College	3-00	9	2	4.50
1	Billy Fitzpatrick	St Kieran's College	2-02	8	2	4.00
3	Ger Freaney	St Kieran's College	2-01	7	2	3.50
3	Tadhg O'Sullivan	St Finbarr's College	2-01	7	1	7.00
