= 1971 Croke Cup =

Irish hurling competition

- Dates: 28 March - 9 May 1971
- Teams: 3
- Champions: St Kieran's College (6th title); Brian Cody (captain)
- Runners-up: St Finbarr's College; Barry Murphy (captain)

Tournament statistics
- Matches played: 2
- Goals scored: 19 (9.5 per match)
- Points scored: 28 (14 per match)
- Top scorer(s): Joe Ryan (4-00)

The 1971 Croke Cup was the 20th staging of the Croke Cup since its establishment by the Gaelic Athletic Association in 1944. The competition ran from 28 March to 9 May 1971.

The North Monastery were the defending champions, however, they were beaten by Coláiste Iognáid Rís in the Harty Cup first round.

The final was played on 9 May 1971 at Semple Stadium in Thurles, between the St Kieran's College and St Finbarr's College, in what was their second meeting in the final and a first in two years. St Kieran's College won the match by 8–06 to 5–08 to claim a record-breaking sixth Croke Cup title overall and a first title in six years.

Joe Ryan was the top scorer with 4-00.

== Qualification ==
Province	Champions
Connacht	Presentation College
Leinster	St Kieran's College
Munster	St Finbarr's College

== Results ==
=== Semi-final ===
28 March 1971 Semi-final	St Finbarr's College	4-08 - 2-06	Presentation College	Gaelic Grounds
	G Hennessy 1-4, J O'Donovan 1-3, F O'Regan 1-0, B Murphy 1-0, M Crowley 0-1.		S Hynes 0-6, JJ Kane 1-0, G Cullinane 1-0.

=== Final ===
9 May 1971 Final	St Kieran's College	8-06 - 5-08	St Finbarr's College	Semple Stadium
	J Ryan 4-0, P White 2-3, N Minogue 1-1, N Brennan 0-2, P Kearney 1-0.		T Fogarty 1-5, M Crowley 2-0, G Hennessy 1-1, D Dwyer 1-0, J O'Donovan 0-2.	Referee: J Moloney (Tipperary)

== Statistics ==
=== Top scorers ===
Overall

Rank	Player	County	Tally	Total	Matches	Average
1	Joe Ryan	St Kieran's College	4-00	12	1	12.00
2	Gerry Hennessy	St Finbarr's College	2-05	11	2	5.50
3	Pat White	St Kieran's College	2-03	9	1	9.00
