= 1993 Croke Cup =

Sports event

- Dates: 4–25 April 1993
- Teams: 4
- Champions: St Kieran's College (12th title); Joe Philpott (captain)
- Runners-up: Our Lady's College, Gort

Tournament statistics
- Matches played: 3
- Goals scored: 8 (2.67 per match)
- Points scored: 57 (19 per match)
- Top scorer(s): Ollie O'Connor (0-15)

The 1993 Croke Cup was the 42nd staging of the Croke Cup since its establishment by the Gaelic Athletic Association in 1944. The competition ran from 4 April to 25 April 1993.

St Kieran's College were the defending champions.

The final was played on 25 April 1993 at MacDonagh Park in Nenagh, between St Kieran's College and Our Lady's College, in what was their first ever meeting in the final. St Kieran's College won the match by 3–15 to 1–10 to claim a record-breaking 12th Croke Cup title overall and a second successive title.

Ollie O'Connor was the top scorer with 0-15.

== Qualification ==
Province	Champions
Connacht	Our Lady's College
Leinster	St Kieran's College
Munster	Limerick CBS
Ulster	St Patrick's College

== Results ==
=== Semi-finals ===
4 April 1993 Semi-final	St Kieran's College	1-15 - 0-03	St Patrick's College	Athboy Grounds
	O O'Connor 0-7, R Moore 1-1, K Hughes 0-2, D Hurley 0-2, B Dalton 0-2, J Young 0-1.		N McCormick 0-3.

4 April 1993 Semi-final	Our Lady's College	1-09 - 2-05	Limerick CBS	Cusack Park
	E Taaffe 0-5, A Quinn 1-0, M Lynskey 0-3, E Costelloe 0-1.		T Houlihan 1-2, P Neenan 1-0, D Hennessy 0-1, J O'Donnell 0-1, A Shanahan 0-1.

=== Final ===
25 April 1993 Final	St Kieran's College	3-15 - 1-10	Our Lady's College	MacDonagh Park
	O O'Connor 0-8, K Hughes 1-1, D Hurley 1-1, S Drennan 1-0, B Dalton 0-2, M Phelan 0-1, O Farrell 0-1, J Young 0-1.		E Taaffe 0-5, S Linnane 1-1, B Murray 0-2, O Clancy 0-1, M Lynskey 0-1.	Referee: T Lyons (Limerick)

== Statistics ==
=== Top scorers ===
Overall

Rank	Player	County	Tally	Total	Matches	Average
1	Ollie O'Connor	St Kieran's College	0-15	15	2	7.50
2	Éamonn Taaffe	Our Lady's College	0-10	10	2	5.00
3	Ken Hughes	St Kieran's College	1-03	6	2	3.00
3	Damien Hurley	St Kieran's College	1-03	6	2	3.00
5	Tony Houlihan	Limerick CBS	1-02	5	1	5.00
