= 1974 Croke Cup =

Irish hurling competition

- Dates: 7–28 April 1974
- Teams: 3
- Champions: St Finbarr's College (4th title); Tadhg Murphy (captain); Michael O'Brien (manager)
- Runners-up: St Kieran's College

Tournament statistics
- Matches played: 2
- Goals scored: 9 (4.5 per match)
- Points scored: 39 (19.5 per match)
- Top scorer(s): Brendan Fennelly (2-15)

The 1974 Croke Cup was the 23rd staging of the Croke Cup since its establishment by the Gaelic Athletic Association in 1944. The competition ran from 7 April to 28 April 1974.

St Peter's College were the defending champions, however, they were beaten by St Kieran's College in the Leinster final.

The final was played on 28 April 1974 at Fraher Field in Dungarvan, between St Finbarr's College and St Kieran's College, in what was their fourth meeting in the final and a first meeting in two years. St Finbarr's College won the match by 2–11 to 1–12 to claim a fourth Croke Cup title overall and a first title in two years.

Brendan Fennelly was the top scorer wit 2-15.

== Qualification ==
Province	Champions
Connacht	Our Lady's College
Leinster	St Kieran's College
Munster	St Finbarr's College

== Results ==
=== Semi-final ===
7 April 1974 Semi-final	St Kieran's College	5-12 - 1-04	Our Lady's College	MacDonagh Park
	B Fennelly 2-5, J Prendergast 1-2, K Brennan 1-2, T Doheny 1-1, D Reid 0-1, S Brennan 0-1.		GP Fahy 1-1, P Gill 0-2, P O'Connor 0-1.

=== Final ===
28 April 1974 Final	St Finbarr's College	2-11 - 1-12	St Kieran's College	Fraher Field
	J Higgins 1-4, T Murphy 1-2, G McEvoy 0-1, F Tobin 0-1, T Hourihane 0-1, S Collins 0-1, J Crowley 0-1.		B Fennelly 0-10, S Brennan 1-1, K Brennan 0-1.

== Statistics ==
=== Top scorers ===
Overall

Rank	Player	County	Tally	Total	Matches	Average
1	Brendan Fennelly	St Kieran's College	2-15	21	2	10.50
2	John Higgins	St Finbarr's College	1-04	7	1	7.00
3	Kieran Brennan	St Kieran's College	1-03	6	2	3.00
