= 1988 Croke Cup =

Irish hurling competition

- Dates: 24 April - 8 May 1988
- Teams: 3
- Champions: St Kieran's College (8th title); Jimmy Conroy (captain)
- Runners-up: Midleton CBS; John Dillon (captain)

Tournament statistics
- Matches played: 2
- Goals scored: 8 (4 per match)
- Points scored: 29 (14.5 per match)
- Top scorer(s): Adrian Ronan (2-08)

The 1988 Croke Cup was the 37th staging of the Croke Cup since its establishment by the Gaelic Athletic Association in 1944. The competition ran from 24 April to 8 May 1988.

St Flannan's College were the defending champions, however, they were beaten by Midleton CBS in the Harty Cup semi-final.

The final was played on 8 May 1988 at Walsh Park in Waterford, between St Kieran's College and Midleton CBS, in what was their first ever meeting in the final. St Kieran's College won the match by 3–10 to 2–07 to claim their eighth Croke Cup title overall and a first title in 13 years.

== Qualification ==
Province	Champions
Connacht	St Mary's College
Leinster	St Kieran's College
Munster	Midleton CBS

== Results ==
=== Semi-final ===
24 April 1988 Semi-final	St Kieran's College	3-08 - 0-04	St Mary's College	Portumna Grounds
	A Ronan 1-5, DJ Carey 1-1, S Lawlor 1-0, T Shefflin 0-2.		L Turley 0-2, P Coyne 0-1, B Cloherty 0-1.

=== Final ===
8 May 1988 Final	St Kieran's College	3-10 - 2-07	Midleton CBS	Walsh Park
	A Ronan 1-3, P Brennan 1-1, E Teehan 1-0, DJ Carey 0-2, D Bradley 0-1, B Ryan 0-1, P O'Neill 0-1, T Shefflin 0-1.		D Quirke 1-2, P O'Brien 1-1, J Dillon 0-3, C Regan 0-1.	Referee: J Moore (Waterford)

== Statistics ==
=== Top scorers ===
Overall

Rank	Player	County	Tally	Total	Matches	Average
1	Adrian Ronan	St Kieran's College	2-08	14	2	7.00
2	D. J. Carey	St Kieran's College	1-03	6	2	3.00
3	David Quirke	Midleton CBS	1-02	5	1	5.00
