= 2002 Croke Cup =

Irish hurling competition

- Dates: 14–28 April 2002
- Teams: 3
- Champions: St Colman's College (4th title); Maurice O'Brien (captain)
- Runners-up: St Kieran's College; Michael Rice (captain)

Tournament statistics
- Matches played: 2
- Goals scored: 6 (3 per match)
- Points scored: 35 (17.5 per match)
- Top scorer(s): Andrew O'Shaughnessy (1-09)

The 2002 Croke Cup was the 51st staging of the Croke Cup since its establishment by the Gaelic Athletic Association in 1944. The competition ran from 14 April to 28 April 2002.

St Colman's College were the defending champions.

The final was played on 28 April 2002 at Semple Stadium in Thurles, between St Colman's College and St Kieran's College, in what was their fifth meeting in the final overall and a first meeting in six years. St Colman's College won the match by 0–11 to 2–04 to claim their fourth Croke Cup title overall and a second successive title.

Andrew O'Shaughnessy was the top scorer with 1-09.

== Qualification ==
Province	Champions
Connacht	Mercy College
Leinster	St Kieran's College
Munster	St Colman's College

== Results ==
=== Semi-final ===
14 April 2002 Semi-final	St Colman's College	4-15 - 0-05	Mercy College	FitzGerald Park
	A O'Shaughnessy 1-6, S Molumphy, L Philpott, M Allen 1-1, P Kearney 0-4, J O'Donnell, E Condon 0-1.	Report	A Garvey, K Hooban 0-2, D Kelly 0-1.	Referee: S McMahon (Clare)

=== Final ===
28 April 2002 Final	St Colman's College	0-11 - 2-04	St Kieran's College	Semple Stadium
	A O'Shaughnessy 0-3 (2f); P Kearney and P Kirby 0-2 each; S Molumphy, A Kearney, R Relihan and E Condon 0-1 each.	Report	E Reid and M Rice (1f) 1-1 each; J Fitzpatrick and S O'Connor 0-1 each.	Referee: A Mac Suibhne (Dublin)

== Statistics ==
=== Top scorers ===
Overall

Rank	Player	Club	Tally	Total	Matches	Average
1	Andrew O'Shaughnessy	St Colman's College	1-09	12	2	6.00
2	Paul Kearney	St Colman's College	0-06	6	2	3.00
3	Stephen Molumphy	St Colman's College	1-02	5	2	2.50
4	Eoin Reid	St Kieran's College	1-01	4	1	4.00
4	Michael Rice	St Kieran's College	1-01	4	1	4.00
4	Luke Philpott	St Colman's College	1-01	4	2	2.00
4	Michael Allen	St Colman's College	1-01	4	2	2.00
