= 1986 Croke Cup =

Irish hurling competition

- Dates: 13–27 April 1986
- Teams: 3
- Champions: St Brendan's CS (1st title); Michael Hogan (captain)
- Runners-up: North Monastery; John Healy (captain)

Tournament statistics
- Matches played: 2
- Goals scored: 9 (4.5 per match)
- Points scored: 31 (15.5 per match)
- Top scorer(s): Joe Errity (2-03)

The 1986 Croke Cup was the 35th staging of the Croke Cup since its establishment by the Gaelic Athletic Association in 1944. The competition ran from 13 April to 27 April 1986.

North Monastery were the defending champions.

The final was played on 27 April 1986 at O'Moore Park, Portlaoise, between the St Brendan's Community School and North Monastery, in what was their second consecutive meeting in the final. St Brendan's Community School won the match by 5–08 to 1–08 to claim their first ever Croke Cup title.

Joe Errity was the top scorer with 2-03.

== Qualification ==
Province	Champions
Connacht	St Joseph's College
Leinster	St Brendan's Community School
Munster	North Monastery

== Results ==
=== Semi-final ===
13 April 1986 Semi-final	St Brendan's Community School	2-10 - 1-05	St Joseph's College	Tynagh Grounds
	P Guinan 1-0, B O'Dwyer 1-0, G Cahill 0-3, J Errity 0-3, D Regan 0-2, M Hogan 0-1, V Dunne 0-1.		D Curley 1-1, A Ryan 0-1, M Duignan 0-1, J Shiel 0-1.

=== Final ===
27 April 1986 Final	St Brendan's Community School	5-08 - 1-08	North Monastery	O'Moore Park
	J Errity 2-0, B Dooley 1-1, D Regan 1-1, G Cahill 0-4, J Pilkington 1-0, M Hogan 0-1, D O'Mara 0-1.		D Hurley 1-1, T O'Keeffe 0-3, P Cummins 0-2, M McElhinney 0-1, G Healy 0-1.	Referee: P Delaney (Laois)

== Statistics ==
=== Top scorers ===
Overall

Rank	Player	County	Tally	Total	Matches	Average
1	Joe Errity	St Brendan's CS	2-03	9	2	4.50
2	Gary Cahill	St Brendan's CS	0-07	7	2	3.50
3	Daithí Regan	St Brendan's CS	1-03	6	2	3.00
