= 1959 Croke Cup =

Irish hurling competition

- Dates: 15 March - 19 April 1959
- Teams: 3
- Champions: St Kieran's College (3rd title); Eddie Keher (captain); Tommy Maher (manager)
- Runners-up: Abbey CBS; Fonsie Condon (captain)

Tournament statistics
- Matches played: 2
- Goals scored: 20 (10 per match)
- Points scored: 31 (15.5 per match)
- Top scorer(s): Eddie Keher (2-09)

The 1959 Croke Cup was the eighth staging of the Croke Cup since its establishment by the Gaelic Athletic Association in 1944. The competition ran from 15 March to 19 April 1959.

St Flannan's College were the defending champions, however, they were beaten by Abbey CBS in the Harty Cup final.

The final was played on 19 April 1959 at Thurles Sportsfield, between St Kieran's College and Abbey CBS, in what was their first ever meeting in the final. St Kieran's College won the match by 2–13 to 4–02 to claim their third Croke Cup title overall and a first title in two years.

Eddie Keher was the top scorer with 2-09.

== Qualification ==
Province	Champions
Connacht	St Joseph's College
Leinster	St Kieran's College
Munster	Abbey CBS

== Results ==
=== Semi-final ===
15 March 1959 Semi-final	St Kieran's College	8-07 - 6-05	St Joseph's College	St Brendan's Park
	E Keher 2-2, M Walsh 2-1, D Somers 2-0, M Langan 1-1, L Kehoe 1-0, J Alley 0-2, P Freaney 0-1.		J Moran 2-0, J Madden 2-0, P Cormican 0-4, N Kelly 1-0, J Langan 1-0, C Stanley 0-1.	Referee: J Dwyer (Tipperary)

=== Final ===
19 April 1959 Final	St Kieran's College	2-13 - 4-02	Abbey CBS	Thurles Sportsfield
	E Keher 0-7, J Nyhan 1-3, T Forristal 1-0, R Somers 0-1, M Walsh 0-1, J Alley 0-1.		L Ryan 1-0, P O'Dwyer 1-0, P O'Sullivan 1-0, F Condon 1-0, M Kirby 0-1, J O'Reilly 0-1.	Referee: G Rosengrave (Dublin)

== Statistics ==
=== Top scorers ===
Overall

Rank	Player	County	Tally	Total	Matches	Average
1	Eddie Keher	St Kieran's College	2-09	15	2	7.50
2	Martin Walsh	St Kieran's College	2-02	8	2	4.00
3	Richard Somers	St Kieran's College	2-01	7	2	3.50
