= 1966 Croke Cup =

Irish hurling competition

- Dates: 3 April – 1 May 1966
- Teams: 4
- Champions: Limerick CBS (2nd title); Éamonn Grimes (captain)
- Runners-up: St Mary's College

Tournament statistics
- Matches played: 3
- Goals scored: 26 (8.67 per match)
- Points scored: 39 (13 per match)
- Top scorer(s): Seán Burke (7-01)

The 1966 Croke Cup was the 15th staging of the Croke Cup since its establishment by the Gaelic Athletic Association in 1944. The competition ran from 3 April to 1 May 1966.

St Kieran's College were the defending champions, however, they were beaten by Limerick CBS in the semi-finals.

The final was played on 1 May 1966 at St Brendan's Park in Birr, between Limerick CBS and St Mary's College, in what was their first ever meeting in the final. Limerick CBS won the match by 8–09 to 2–02 to claim their second Croke Cup title overall and a first title in two years.

Seán Burke was the top scorer with 7-01.

== Qualification ==
Province	Champions
Connacht	St Mary's College
Leinster	St Kieran's College
Munster	Limerick CBS
Ulster	St Mary's CBGS

== Results ==
=== Semi-final ===
3 April 1966 Semi-final	St Mary's College	4-05 - 1-05	St Mary's CBGS	St Tiernach's Park
	J Hughes 2-0, A Rabbitte 1-1, L Hanniffy 1-0, P Fahy 0-2, R Glynn 0-1, M O'Connell 0-1.		R Rice 1-0, C Carson 0-2, A Hamill 0-1, A McGlone 0-1, G Mallon 0-1.

24 April 1966 Semi-final	Limerick CBS	8-09 - 3-09	St Kieran's College	MacDonagh Park
	S Burke 5-1, E Grimes 1-2, M Grace 1-1, L Ryan 1-0, P Doherty 0-4, G O'DOnoghue 0-1.		P Dunne 0-6, B Morrissey 1-0, S Walsh 1-0, M Delaney 1-0, D Prendergast 0-2, JJ Ryan 0-1.

=== Final ===
1 May 1966 Final	Limerick CBS	8-09 - 2-02	St Mary's College	St Brendan's Park
	L Ryan 2-0, S Burke 2-0, E Grimes 1-3, G O'Donoghue 1-2, P McCarthy 1-2, R Grace 1-1, P Doherty 0-1.		P Fahy 1-2, R Glynn 1-0.	Referee: J Dowling (Offaly)

== Statistics ==
=== Top scorers ===
Overall

Rank	Player	County	Tally	Total	Matches	Average
1	Seán Burke	Limerick CBS	7-01	22	2	11.00
2	Éamonn Grimes	Limerick CBS	2-05	11	2	5.50
3	Liam Ryan	Limerick CBS	3-00	9	2	4.50
