= 1995 Croke Cup =

Hurling competition

- Dates: 2–30 April 1994
- Teams: 4
- Champions: St. Raphael's College (1st title); Cathal O'Reilly (captain)
- Runners-up: Midleton CBS; Donal Óg Cusack (captain)

Tournament statistics
- Matches played: 3
- Goals scored: 9 (3 per match)
- Points scored: 59 (19.67 per match)
- Top scorer(s): Kevin Broderick (5-06)

The 1995 Croke Cup was the 44th staging of the Croke Cup since its establishment by the Gaelic Athletic Association in 1944. The competition ran from 2 April to 30 April 1995.

The North Monastery were the defending champions, however, they were beaten by Lismore CBS in the Harty Cup semi-final.

The final was played on 30 April 1995 at the Gaelic Grounds in Limerick, between St. Raphael's College and Midleton CBS Secondary School, in what was their first ever meeting in the final. St Raphael's College won the match by 3–10 to 3–05 to claim their first ever Croke Cup title. They remain the only Galway school to have claimed the title.

Kevin Broderick was the top scorer with 5-06.

== Qualification ==
Province	Champions
Connacht	St. Raphael's College
Leinster	Good Counsel College
Munster	MIdleton CBS
Ulster	Cross & Passion College

== Results ==
=== Semi-finals ===
2 April 1995 Semi-final	St. Raphael's College	3-27 - 0-02	Cross & Passion College	Páirc Tailteann
	K Broderick 2-5, C Earls 0-8, T Daniels 1-2, K Keane 0-4, C Hynes 0-3, E McMahon 0-2, N Shiel 0-2, V Maher 0-1.		C McCaughan 0-1, L McMullan 0-1.	Referee: O O'Neill (Meath)

23 April 1995 Semi-final	Midleton CBS	0-10 - 0-05	Good Counsel College	Fraher Field
	J Deane 0-4, M O'Connell 0-3, L Walsh 0-1, J Cotter 0-1, P Mullaney 0-1.		M Redmond 0-3, P Cottrell 0-1, L Purcell 0-1.	Referee: P Moore (Waterford)

=== Final ===
30 April 1995 Final	St. Raphael's College	3-10 - 3-05	Midleton CBS	Gaelic Grounds
	K Broderick 3-1, K Keane 2-0, C Earls 0-5, T Daniels 0-2, E McMahon 0-1, K Daniels 0-1.		J Deane 3-1, M O'Connell 0-3, P Mullaney 0-1.	Referee: T Walsh (Limerick)

== Statistics ==
=== Top scorers ===
Overall

Rank	Player	County	Tally	Total	Matches	Average
1	Kevin Broderick	St Raphael's College	5-06	21	2	10.50
2	Joe Deane	Midleton CBS	3-05	14	2	7.00
3	Clement Earls	St Raphael's College	0-13	13	2	6.50
4	Kenneth Keane	St Raphael's College	2-04	10	2	5.00
5	Trevor Daniels	St Raphael's College	1-04	7	2	3.50
