= 1976 Croke Cup =

Irish hurling competition

- Dates: 4 April - 16 May 1976
- Teams: 3
- Champions: St Flannan's College (6th title); Leo Quinlan (captain)
- Runners-up: Presentation College, Athenry

Tournament statistics
- Matches played: 3
- Goals scored: 15 (5 per match)
- Points scored: 45 (15 per match)
- Top scorer(s): Pat Hurney (3-03)

The 1976 Croke Cup was the 25th staging of the Croke Cup since its establishment by the Gaelic Athletic Association in 1944. The competition ran from 4 April to 16 May 1976.

St Kieran's College were the defending champions, however, they were beaten by Kilkenny CBS in the Leinster Champiosnhip semi-final.

The final, a replay, was played on 16 May 1976 at MacDonagh Park in Nenagh, between St Flannan's College and Presentation College, Athenry, in what was their first ever meeting in the final. St Flannan's College won the match by 3–09 to 1–07 to claim a sixth Croke Cup title overall and a first title in 18 years.

Pat Hurney was the top scorer with 3-03.

== Qualification ==
Province	Champions
Connacht	Presentation College
Leinster	Kilkenny CBS
Munster	St Flannan's College

== Results ==
=== Semi-final ===
4 April 1976 Semi-final	Presentation College	2-11 - 2-07	Kilkenny CBS	MacDonagh Park
	P Hurney 1-2, M Duffy 1-2, G Dempsey 0-4, J Connolly 0-2, L Kennedy 0-1.		M Nolan 1-2, M Langton 0-4, A Berrigan 1-0, A Malone 0-1.

=== Final ===
2 May 1976 Final	St Flannan's College	3-07 - 4-04	Presentation College	MacDonagh Park
	C Lyons 2-1, L Quinlan 1-4, G Murphy 0-1, M Meehan 0-1.		P Hurney 1-1, P Ryan 1-0, J Ryan 1-0, T Connolly 1-0, M Duffy 0-1, G Dempsey 0-1, P Powell 0-1.

16 May 1976 Final replay	St Flannan's College	3-09 - 1-07	Presentation College	MacDonagh Park
	J Moran 2-0, J Murphy 1-1, PJ Deasy 0-3, C Lyons 0-2, M Meehan 0-2, L Quinlan 0-1.		P Hurney 1-0, P Ryan 0-2, M Duffy 0-2, P Powell 0-1, J Ryan 0-1, G Dempsey 0-1.

== Statistics ==
=== Top scorers ===
Overall

Rank	Player	County	Tally	Total	Matches	Average
1	Pat Hurney	Presentation College	3-03	12	3	4.00
2	Cyril Lyons	St Flannan's College	2-03	9	2	4.50
3	Leo Quinlan	St Flannan's College	1-05	8	2	4.00
3	Michael Duffy	St Flannan's College	1-05	8	3	2.33
