= 1973 Croke Cup =

Irish hurling competition

- Dates: 23 March - 15 April 1973
- Teams: 3
- Champions: St Peter's College (4th title); Andy Doyle (captain)
- Runners-up: Our Lady's College, Gort

Tournament statistics
- Matches played: 3
- Goals scored: 15 (5 per match)
- Points scored: 44 (14.67 per match)
- Top scorer(s): Pat O'Connor (3-12)

The 1973 Croke Cup was the 22nd staging of the Croke Cup since its establishment by the Gaelic Athletic Association in 1944. The competition ran from 23 March to 15 April 1973.

St Finbarr's College were the defending champions.

The final, a replay, was played on 15 April 1973 at O'Moore Park in Portlaoise, between St Peter's College and Our Lady's College, in what was their first ever meeting in the final. St Peter's College won the match by 4–15 to 1–05 to claim a fourth Croke Cup title overall and a first title in five years.

Pat O'Connor was the top scorer with 3-12.

== Qualification ==
| Province | Champions |
|---|---|
| Connacht | Our Lady's College |
| Leinster | St Peter's College |
| Munster | St Finbarr's College |

== Results ==
=== Semi-final ===
| 23 March 1973 Semi-final | Our Lady's College | 4-06 - 2-06 | St Finbarr's College | Gaelic Grounds |
| | P O'Connor 3-6, P Lane 1-0. | | J Crowley 2-2, P O'Flynn 0-2, J Higgins 0-1, T Murphy 0-1. |

=== Final ===
| 8 April 1973 Final | St Peter's College | 2-06 - 2-06 | Our Lady's College | Semple Stadium |
| | M Doyle 2-0, J Moynihan 0-2, P Hanrick 0-2, D O'Connor 0-2. | | G Curtin 1-0, A Brennan 1-0, P O'Connor 0-3, N Lane 0-2, A Connolly 0-1. |

| 15 April 1973 Final replay | St Peter's College | 4-15 - 1-05 | Our Lady's College | O'Moore Park |
| | D O'Connor 1-5, M Doyle 2-1, P Hanrick 0-5, N Fanning 1-0, D Rowesome 0-2, P Kinsella 0-1, J Moynihan 0-1. | | A Brennan 1-0, P O'Connor 0-3, G Curtin 0-1, A Connolly 0-1. |

== Statistics ==
=== Top scorers ===
Overall

| Rank | Player | County | Tally | Total | Matches | Average |
|---|---|---|---|---|---|---|
| 1 | Pat O'Connor | Our Lady's College | 3-12 | 21 | 3 | 7.00 |
| 2 | Mick Doyle | St Peter's College | 4-01 | 13 | 2 | 6.50 |
| 3 | Denis O'Connor | St Peter's College | 1-07 | 10 | 2 | 5.00 |
| 4 | Johnny Crowley | St Finbarr's College | 2-02 | 8 | 1 | 8.00 |
| 5 | Pat Hanrick | St Peter's College | 0-07 | 7 | 2 | 3.50 |
