= 2008 Croke Cup =

Irish hurling competition

- Dates: 23 March – 19 April 2008
- Teams: 5
- Champions: DLS College Waterford (2nd title); Noel Connors (captain); Philip Mahony (captain)
- Runners-up: Thurles CBS; Kevin O'Gorman (captain)

Tournament statistics
- Matches played: 5
- Goals scored: 12 (2.4 per match)
- Points scored: 117 (23.4 per match)
- Top scorer(s): Stephen Power (2-22)

The 2008 Croke Cup was the 57th staging of the Croke Cup since its establishment by the Gaelic Athletic Association in 1944. The competition ran from 23 March to 19 April 2008.

De La Salle College Waterford were the defending champions.

The final, a replay, was played on 19 April 2008 at Nowlan Park in Kilkenny, between De La Salle College Waterford and Thurles CBS, in what was their first ever meeting in the final but their third meeting that season. De La Salle College Waterford won the match by 2–09 to 2–08 to claim their second Croke Cup title overall and their second title in succession.

Stephen Power was the top scorer with 2-22.

== Results ==
=== Quarter-final ===
23 March 2008 Quarter-final	Thurles CBS	0-22 - 0-10	Kilkenny CBS	Tom Ryall Park
	D Butler 0-9, K Morris 0-4, J O'Neill 0-2, P O'Brien 0-2, D Maher 0-1, C Shelly 0-1, M Russell 0-1, C Ryan 0-1, T Comerford 0-1.		P Guinan 0-5, M Gaffney 0-3, M Bambrick 0-1, R Doyle 0-1.	Referee: J O'Mahony (Limerick)

=== Semi-finals ===
29 March 2008 Semi-final	Thurles CBS	0-12 - 0-10	Dublin Colleges	Nowlan Park
	D Butler 0-5, R Ryan 0-2, C Shelly 0-2, J O'Neill 0-1, C Ryan 0-1, M Russell 0-1.		N McMorrow 0-5, K O'Loughlin 0-2, C Clinton 0-2, L Rushe 0-1.	Referee: J Owens (Wexford)

29 March 2008 Semi-final	DLS College Waterford	4-14 - 1-05	Gort Community School	Páirc Shíleáin
	S Power 1-11, B O'Sullivan 1-0, P McCarthy 1-0, D Smith 1-0, E Barrett 0-1, Paudie Mahony 0-1, I Power 0-1.		P O'Connor 1-0, G Hennelly 0-2, R Cummins 0-2, S Lambert 0-1.	Referee: B Kelly (Westmeath)

=== Final ===
12 April 2008 Final	DLS College Waterford	2-12 - 1-15	Thurles CBS	Nowlan Park
	S Power 0-8 (8f); P Mahony 1-3; P McCarthy 1-0; K Fitzgerald 0-1.	Report	K Morris 0-5 (4f); J O'Neill 1-2; P O'Brien 0-3; D Butler, M Russell, M Greene, A McCormack, C Shelley 0-1 each.	Referee: J McGrath (Armagh)

19 April 2008 Final replay	DLS College Waterford	2-09 - 2-08	Thurles CBS	Nowlan Park
	S Power 1-3 (1-0 pen, 0-1f, 0-1 65), P Mahony 1-3, D Purcell 0-2, P McCarthy 0-1.	Report	K Morris 2-5, (0-3f), R Ryan, C Shelley and A. McCormack 0-1 each.	Referee: J Owens (Wexford)

== Statistics ==
=== Top scorers ===
Overall

Rank	Player	County	Tally	Total	Matches	Average
1	Stephen Power	DLS College	2-22	28	3	9.33
2	Kieran Morris	Thurles CBS	2-14	20	4	5.00
3	David Butler	Thurles CBS	0-15	15	4	3.75
4	Pauric Mahony	DLS College	2-07	13	3	4.33
5	John O'Neill	Thurles CBS	1-05	8	4	2.00
