= 2012 Croke Cup =

Irish hurling competition

- Dates: 10 March - 31 March 2012
- Teams: 5
- Champions: St Joseph's CBS (1st title); Jason Forde (captain)
- Runners-up: Kilkenny CBS; Jack Langton (captain)

Tournament statistics
- Matches played: 4
- Goals scored: 12 (3 per match)
- Points scored: 99 (24.75 per match)
- Top scorer(s): Jason Forde (2-16)

The 2012 Croke Cup was the 61st staging of the Croke Cup since its establishment by the Gaelic Athletic Association in 1944. The competition ran from 10 March to 31 March 2012.

St Kieran's College were the defending champions, however, they were beaten by St Joseph's CBS, Nenagh in the All-Ireland semi-final.

The final was played on 31 March 2012 at Semple Stadium in Thurles, between St Joseph's CBS and Kilkenny CBS, in what was their first ever meeting in the final. St Joseph's CBS won the match by 3–10 to 2–11 to claim their first ever Croke Cup title.

Jason Forde was the top scorer with 2-16.

== Results ==
=== Quarter-final ===
10 March 2012 Quarter-final	Kilkenny CBS	2-12 - 1-12	Coláiste na nDéise	Walsh Park
	O McGrath 1-5 (1-2f, 2 65), M Clifford 1-2, J Langton, JP Treacy, K Kenny, R Buckley, D Bolger 0-1 each.	Report	Cathal Curran 0-7 (6f), P Curran 1-0, R Donnelly 0-2, K Power, M Harney, C Dunford 0-1 each.	Referee: P O'Dwyer (Carlow)

=== Semi-finals ===
17 March 2012 Semi-final	Kilkenny CBS	3-15 - 1-08	Portumna Community School	The Ragg
	C Doyle 0-9 (7f), K Kenny 2-1, M Clifford 1-1, D Sheehan, P Campion, D Bolger, P Delahunty 0-1 each.	Report	P Killeen 1-3 (1-0 pen, 0-1f), J Starr, R O'Meara (1f) 0-2 each, D Daly 0-1.	Referee: F Horgan (Tipperary)

17 March 2012 Semi-final	St Joseph's CBS	0-17 - 0-14	St Kieran's College	The Ragg
	J Forde 0-14 (12f), P Fogarty 0-2, K Gleeson 0-1.	Report	A Cleere 0-8f, M Donnelly 0-4 (2f), C Prendergast, J Maher 0-1 each.	Referee: A Stapleton (Laois)

=== Final ===
31 March 2012 Final	St Joseph's CBS	3-10 - 2-11	Kilkenny CBS	Semple Stadium
	J Forde 2-2 (2f), J Mackey 0-3, P Fogarty 1-0, S O’Brien, K Gleeson 0-2 each, S Geaney 0-1.	Report	M Clifford 0-4, O McGrath 0-3f, S Cuddihy, N Mullins 1-0 each, P Campion, E Fennelly, K Kenny, R Buckley 0-1 each.	Referee: C McAllister (Cork)

== Statistics ==
=== Top scorers ===
Rank	Player	Club	Tally	Total	Matches	Average
1	Jason Forde	St Joseph's CBS	2-16	22	2	11.00
2	Mason Clifford	Kilkenny CBS	2-07	13	3	4.33
3	Owen McGrath	Kilkenny CBS	1-08	11	3	3.66
4	Ciarán Doyle	Kilkenny CBS	0-09	9	3	3.00
5	Aidan Cleere	St Kieran's College	0-08	8	1	8.00
