= 2004 Croke Cup =

Irish hurling competition

- Dates: 4 April - 3 May 2004
- Teams: 3
- Champions: St Kieran's College (16th title); John Walsh (captain)
- Runners-up: St Raphael's College

Tournament statistics
- Matches played: 2
- Goals scored: 5 (2.5 per match)
- Points scored: 51 (25.5 per match)
- Top scorer(s): Richie Power (1-17)

The 2004 Croke Cup was the 53rd staging of the Croke Cup since its establishment by the Gaelic Athletic Association in 1944. The competition ran from 4 April to 3 May 2004.

St Kieran's College were the defending champions.

The final was played on 3 May 2004 at Parnell Park in Dublin, between St Kieran's College and St Raphael's College, in what was their first ever meeting in the final. St Kieran's College won the match by 3–20 to 1–06 to claim their 16th Croke Cup title overall and a second successive title.

Richie Power was the top scorer with 1–17.

== Qualification ==
Province	Champions
Connacht	St Raphael's College
Leinster	St Kieran's College
Munster	St Flannan's College

== Results ==
=== Semi-final ===
4 April 2004 Semi-final	St Kieran's College	0-17 - 1-08	St Flannan's College	The Ragg
	R Power (0-8), D O'Neill, M McEvoy (0-2) each, N Prendergast, S Prendergast, M Aylward, D Bergin, R Hogan (0-1) each.	Report	B Gaffney, K Kennedy (0-3) each, C Ryan (1-0< J McInerney, S O'Brien (0-1) each.	Referee: J McDonnell (Tipperary)

=== Final ===
3 May 2004 Final	St Kieran's College	3-20 - 1-06	St Raphael's College	Parnell Park
	R Power 1-9 (5f); M Aylward 2-1; R Hogan 0-5; M Nolan, D O'Neill, S Prendergast, K Lanigan, J Walsh (f) 0-1 each.	Report	K Haverty 1-1; F Kerrigan 0-2; G Kilcarr 0-2 (2f); S Kelly 0-1.	Referee: J McDonnell (Tipperary)

== Statistics ==
=== Top scorers ===
Overall

Rank	Player	Club	Tally	Total	Matches	Average
1	Richie Power	St Kieran's College	1-17	20	2	10.00
2	Mark Aylward	St Kieran's College	2-02	8	2	4.00
3	Richie Hogan	St Kieran's College	0-06	6	2	3.00

=== Miscellaneous ===
- John Walsh of Laois became the first non-Kilkenny man since Lar Dunphy in 1948 to captain St Kieran's College to the All-Ireland title.
