= 1946 Croke Cup =

Irish hurling competition

- Dates: 5 May 1946
- Teams: 2
- Champions: St Flannan's College (3rd title); J. Bugler (captain)
- Runners-up: O'Connell School

Tournament statistics
- Matches played: 1
- Goals scored: 10 (10 per match)
- Points scored: 9 (9 per match)
- Top scorer(s): J. Bugler (2-03)

The 1946 Croke Cup was the third staging of the Croke Cup since its establishment by the Gaelic Athletic Association in 1944.

St Flannan's College were the defending champions.

The final was played on 5 May 1946 at Croke Park in Dublin, between St Flannan's College and O'Connell School, in what was their first ever meeting in the final. St Flannan's College won the match by 5–07 to 5–02 to claim their third successive Croke Cup title.

== Qualification ==
Province	Champions
Leinster	O'Connell School
Munster	St Flannan's College

== Results ==
=== Final ===
5 May 1946 Final	St Flannan's College	5-07 - 5-02	O'Connell School	Croke Park
	J Bugler 2-3, T O'Meara 0-4, J Hanley 1-0, T Gallagher 1-0, T Lynch 1-0.		E Clancy 2-0, J Clancy 2-0, T Jennings 1-0, T Mulligan 0-1, J O'Neill 0-1.
