= 1982 Croke Cup =

Irish hurling competition

- Dates: 25 April - 16 May 1982
- Teams: 3
- Champions: St Flannan's College (8th title); Peter Leyden (captain)
- Runners-up: St Peter's College

Tournament statistics
- Matches played: 3
- Goals scored: 6 (2 per match)
- Points scored: 54 (18 per match)
- Top scorer(s): Tom Dempsey (0-17)

The 1982 Croke Cup was the 31st staging of the Croke Cup since its establishment by the Gaelic Athletic Association in 1944. The competition ran from 25 April to 16 May 1982.

Kilkenny CBS were the defending champions, however, they were beaten by St Peter's College in the Leinster final.

The final, a replay, was played on 16 May 1982 at Semple Stadium, Thurles, between St Flannan's College and the St Peter's College, in what was their first ever meeting in the final. St Flannan's College won the match by 2–09 to 0–10 to claim a record-breaking eighth Croke Cup title and a first title in three years.

Tom Dempsey was the top scorer with 0–17.

== Qualification ==
Province	Champions
Connacht	Our Lady's College
Leinster	St Peter's College
Munster	St Flannan's College

== Results ==
=== Semi-final ===
25 April 1982 Semi-final	St Peter's College	1-18 - 1-09	Our Lady's College	Semple Stadium
	T Dempsey 0-11, F O'Leary 0-4, S Kelly 1-0, L Turner 0-1, J Harding 0-1, G Lyons 0-1.		P Taaffe 1-7, A Cunningham 0-1, S Keane 0-1.

=== Final ===
9 May 1982 Final	St Flannan's College	1-04 - 1-04	St Peter's College	Semple Stadium
	M Kelly 1-1, R Sampson 0-2, G Mannion 0-1.		S Kelly 1-0, T Dempsey 0-2, J Roche 0-1.

16 May 1982 Final replay	St Flannan's College	2-09 - 0-10	St Peter's College	Semple Stadium
	D Quirke 1-2, G Mannion 1-2, J Murphy 0-2, M Kelly 0-1, J McInerney 0-1, E O'Flaherty 0-1.		T Dempsey 0-4, G Lyons 0-2, F O'Leary 0-1, J Roche 0-1.

== Statistics ==
=== Top scorers ===
Overall

Rank	Player	County	Tally	Total	Matches	Average
1	Tom Dempsey	St Peter's College	0-17	17	3	5.66
2	Pat Taaffe	Our Lady's College	1-07	10	1	10.00
3	Seán Kelly	St Flannan's College	2-00	6	3	2.00
3	Gearóid Mannion	St Flannan's College	1-03	6	3	2.00
