= 1978 Croke Cup =

Irish hurling competition

- Dates: 16 April - 7 May 1978
- Teams: 3
- Champions: Templemore CBS (1st title); Martin Bourke (captain)
- Runners-up: St Peter's College

Tournament statistics
- Matches played: 2
- Goals scored: 4 (2 per match)
- Points scored: 28 (14 per match)
- Top scorer(s): Éamonn Cody (2-02)

The 1978 Croke Cup was the 27th staging of the Croke Cup since its establishment by the Gaelic Athletic Association in 1944. The competition ran from 16 April to 7 May 1978.

St Colman's College were the defending champions, however, they were beaten by De La Salle College Waterford in the Harty Cup second round.

The final was played on 17 May 1978 at Nowlan Park in Kilkenny, between Templemore CBS and St Peter's College, in what was their first ever meeting in the final. Templemore CBS won the match by 2–11 to 1–04 to claim their first ever Croke Cup title.

Éamonn Cody was the top scorer with 2-02.

== Qualification ==
Province	Champions
Connacht	Our Lady's College
Leinster	St Peter's College
Munster	Templemore CBS

== Results ==
=== Semi-final ===
16 April 1978 Semi-final	St Peter's College	1-09 - 0-04	Our Lady's College	Dr Cullen Park
	T Wright 1-0, J White 0-2, J O'Dwyer 0-2, J McDonald 0-2, B Foley 0-1, J Kavanagh 0-1, B Curtis 0-1.		P Piggott 0-1, G Broderick 0-1, P Conroy 0-1, A Moylan 0-1.

=== Final ===
7 May 1978 Final	Templemore CBS	2-11 - 1-04	St Peter's College	Nowlan Park
	E Cody 2-2, P McGrath 0-3, B Russell 0-2, B Ryan 0-2, P Treacy 0-1, N Fogarty 0-1.		P Doyle 1-0, J McDonald 0-1, J O'Dwyer 0-1, P Crean 0-1, M Farrell 0-1.
