= 2017 Croke Cup =

Irish hurling competition

- Dates: 8–25 March 2017
- Teams: 6
- Sponsor: Masita
- Champions: Our Lady's SS (1st title); Paddy Cadell (captain); Tom Byrnes (manager)
- Runners-up: St Kieran's College; Adrian Mullen (captain); Tom Hogan (manager)

Tournament statistics
- Matches played: 5
- Goals scored: 16 (3.2 per match)
- Points scored: 147 (29.4 per match)
- Top scorer(s): Adrian Mullen (4-11)

The 2017 All-Ireland Post Primary Schools Croke Cup was the 66th staging of the Croke Cup since its establishment by the Gaelic Athletic Association in 1944.

St Kieran's College were the defending champions.

The final was played on 25 March 2017 at Semple Stadium in Thurles, between Our Lady's Secondary School and St Kieran's College, in what was their first ever meeting in the final. Our Lady's Secondary School won the match by 3–13 to 3–11 to claim their first ever Croke Cup title.

Adrian Mullen was the top scorer with 4–11.

== Qualification ==
Province	Champions	Runners-up
Connacht	St Brigid's College	Presentation College
Leinster	St Kieran's College	Kilkenny CBS
Munster	Our Lady's SS	St Colman's College

== Results ==
=== Quarter-finals ===
8 March 2017 Quarter-final	St Brigid's College	0-19 - 1-13	St Colman's College	University of Limerick
	C Molloy 0-8 (0-6f, 0-1 ’65), R Glennon, D Towolawi, D Mannion (0-1 sl) 0-3 each, J Nevin & B Moran 0-1 each.	Report	D Lenihan 0-8 (0-5f), J Mehigan 1-0, N O’Leary 0-2f, B Murphy, G Lardner & A Creed 0-1 each.	Referee: J Murphy (Limerick)

8 March 2017 Quarter-final	Kilkenny CBS	3-09 - 0-15	Presentation College, Athenry	Abbottstown COE
	S Bolger 2-2, N Brassil 0-4 (0-1f), C Heary 0-3, S Boyd 1-0.	Report	E Niland 0-11 (0-10f), P Foley, B Callanan, O Connolly and E Caulfield 0-1 each.	Referee: B Gavin (Offaly)

=== Semi-finals ===
15 March 2017 Semi-final	St Kieran's College	3-19 - 1-09	St Brigid's College	O'Connor Park
	A Mullen (2-9, 5 frees); C Brennan (1-2); E Moylan (0-4); D Barron (0-3); T Drea (0-1).	Report	D Towolawi (1-2); C Molloy (0-4, 0-2 frees); D McGlynn, R Glennon, D Mannion (0-1 each).	Referee: C McAllister (Cork)

15 March 2017 Semi-final	Our Lady's Secondary School	0-24 - 2-15	Kilkenny CBS	O'Moore Park
	B McGrath 0-9 (0-5f, 0-2 ’65) A Ormonde 0-5, D O’Shea 0-3, J Kelly & L Fairbrother (1f) 0-2 each, É McBride, J Ryan & R McCormack 0-1 each.	Report	N Brassil 0-9 (7f, 1 65), J Sheehan 1-3, B Maher 1-0f, S Boyd 0-2, S Bolger 0-1.	Referee: J Keane (Galway)

=== Final ===
25 March 2017 Final	Our Lady's Secondary School	3-13 - 3-11	St Kieran's College	Semple Stadium
	B McGrath 1-8 (4f, 2 '65'), L Fairbrother 1-1, R McCormack 1-0, D Ryan, J Kelly, D O'Shea, A O'Meara 0-1 each.	Report	A Mullen 2-2 (1f, 1'65'), C Brennan 1-1, E O'Shea 0-3, D Barron 0-2, E Shefflin, T Drea, D Phelan 0-1 each.	Referee: C Lyons (Cork)

== Statistics ==
=== Top scorers ===
Rank	Player	Club	Tally	Total	Matches	Average
1	Adrian Mullen	St Kieran's College	4-11	23	2	11.50
2	Brian McGrath	Our Lady's SS	1-17	20	2	10.00
3	Niall Brassil	Kilkenny CBS	0-13	13	2	6.50
4	Conor Molloy	St Brigid's College	0-12	12	2	6.00
5	Evan Niland	Presentation College	0-11	11	1	11.00
