= 1975 Croke Cup =

Irish hurling competition

- Dates: 23 March - 20 April 1975
- Teams: 3
- Champions: St Kieran's College (7th title); Kieran Brennan (captain)
- Runners-up: Coláiste Iognáid Rís

Tournament statistics
- Matches played: 2
- Goals scored: 21 (10.5 per match)
- Points scored: 24 (12 per match)

The 1975 Croke Cup was the 24th staging of the Croke Cup since its establishment by the Gaelic Athletic Association in 1944. The competition ran from 23 March to 20 April 1975.

St Finbarr's College were the defending champions, however, they were beaten by Thurles CBS in the Harty Cup first round.

The final was played on 20 April 1975 at Semple Stadium in Thurles, between St Kieran's College and Coláiste Iognáid Rís, in what was their first ever meeting in the final. St Kieran's College won the match by 6–09 to 2–03 to claim a seventh Croke Cup title overall and a first title in four years.

== Qualification ==
Province	Champions
Connacht	Our Lady's College
Leinster	St Kieran's College
Munster	Coláiste Iognáid Rís

== Results ==
=== Semi-final ===
23 March 1975 Semi-final	Coláiste Iognáid Rís	8-10 - 5-02	Our Lady's College	Gaelic Grounds

=== Final ===
20 April 1975 Final	St Kieran's College	6-09 - 2-03	Coláiste Iognáid Rís	Semple Stadium
	K Brennan 2-3, P Brennan 2-0, K O'Shea 1-1, J Prendergast 1-1, P Prendergast 0-1, D Fitzgerald 0-1, G Ryan 0-1, S Brennan 0-1.		J Barry 1-1, J Murphy 1-1, P Crowley 0-1.	Referee: J Moloney (Tipperary)
