= 1958 Croke Cup =

Irish hurling competition

- Dates: 30 March - 27 April 1958
- Teams: 3
- Champions: St Flannan's College (5th title)
- Runners-up: St Kieran's College

Tournament statistics
- Matches played: 2
- Goals scored: 10 (5 per match)
- Points scored: 23 (11.5 per match)
- Top scorer(s): Ger Jordan (5-01)

The 1958 Croke Cup was the seventh staging of the Croke Cup since its establishment by the Gaelic Athletic Association in 1944. The competition ran from 30 March to 27 April 1958.

St Kieran's College were the defending champions.

The final was played on 27 April 1958 at Thurles Sportsfield, between St Flannan's College and St Kieran's College, in what was their third meeting in the final and a second consecutive meeting. St Flannan's College won the match by 3–10 to 0–2 to claim their fifth Croke Cup title overall and a first title in 11 years.

Ger Jordan was the top scorer with 5-01.

== Qualification ==
Province	Champions
Connacht	St Mary's College
Leinster	St Kieran's College
Munster	St Flannan's College

== Results ==
=== Semi-final ===
30 March 1958 Semi-final	St Flannan's College	6-08 - 1-03	St Mary's College	Cusack Park
	J Jordan 4-1, F Cleary 2-0, O Naughton 0-4, K Smith 0-1, M Deasy 0-1, B McDonnell 0-1.		Barry 1-1, Deignam 0-2.

=== Final ===
27 April 1958 Final	St Flannan's College	3-10 - 0-02	St Kieran's College	Thurles Sportsfield
	P Kennedy 1-9, J Devlin 1-1, J Jordan 1-0.		M Kehoe 0-1, O Harrington 0-1.

== Statistics ==
=== Top scorers ===
Overall

Rank	Player	County	Tally	Total	Matches	Average
1	Ger Jordan	St Flannan's College	5-01	16	2	8.00
1	Pádraig Kennedy	St Flannan's College	1-09	12	2	6.00
3	Frank Cleary	St Flannan's College	2-00	6	2	3.00
