= 1960 Croke Cup =

Irish hurling competition

- Dates: 27 March - 8 May 1960
- Teams: 3
- Champions: North Monastery (1st title); John Sutton (captain)
- Runners-up: St Peter's College

Tournament statistics
- Matches played: 3
- Goals scored: 12 (4 per match)
- Points scored: 33 (11 per match)
- Top scorer(s): Paddy Fahy (1-06)

The 1960 Croke Cup was the ninth staging of the Croke Cup since its establishment by the Gaelic Athletic Association in 1944. The competition ran from 27 March to 8 May 1960.

St Kieran's College were the defending champions, however, they were beaten by St Peter's College in the Leinster final.

The final was played on 8 May 1960 at Croke Park in Dublin, between the North Monastery and St Peter's College, in what was their first ever meeting in the final. The North Monastery won the match by 1–09 to 1–04 to claim their first ever Croke Cup title.

Paddy Fahy was the top scorer with 1-06.

== Qualification ==
Province	Champions
Connacht	St Mary's College
Leinster	St Peter's College
Munster	North Monastery

== Results ==
=== Semi-final ===
27 March 1960 Semi-final	St Peter's College	4-04 - 3-07	St Mary's College	Croke Park
	E Doyle 1-2, P Murphy 1-0, B O'Neill 1-0, M Jordan 1-0, W Redmond 0-1, M Rossiter 0-1.		P Fahy 1-5, M Caulfield 1-0, M Niland 1-0, J Whiriskey 0-2.

10 April 1960 Semi-final replay	St Peter's College	2-05 - 1-04	St Mary's College	Croke Park
	M Rossiter 1-0, W Redmond 1-0, P Murphy 0-2, T Byrne 0-1, B O'Neill 0-1, E Doyle 0-1.		J Setright 1-0, M Connolly 0-2, M Niland 0-1, P Fahy 0-1.

=== Final ===
8 May 1960 Final	North Monastery	1-09 - 1-04	St Peter's College	Croke Park
	P Curley 1-4, C Mulcahy 0-2, E O'Connor 0-1, D Joyce 0-1, D Moore 0-1.		J Byrne 1-1, P Murphy 0-1, E Doyle 0-1, W Redmond 0-1.

== Statistics ==
=== Top scorers ===
Overall

Rank	Player	County	Tally	Total	Matches	Average
1	Paddy Fahy	St Mary's College	1-06	9	2	4.50
2	Paddy Curley	North Monastery	1-04	7	1	7.00
2	Éamonn Doyle	St Mary's College	1-04	7	3	2.33
