= Dr Croke Cup =

Hurling competition

All-Ireland PPS Croke Cup
- Current season or competition: 2026 Croke Cup
- Irish: Craobh Iomána Iarbhunscoileanna na hÉireann
- Code: Hurling
- Founded: 1944; 82 years ago
- Region: Ireland (GAA)
- Trophy: Dr Croke Cup
- No. of teams: 6
- Title holders: St Kieran's College (26th title)
- First winner: St Flannan's College
- Most titles: St Kieran's College (26 titles)
- Sponsors: Masita
- TV partner: TG4
- Official website: Official website

The All-Ireland Post-Primary Schools Croke Cup, is an annual inter-schools hurling competition organised by the Gaelic Athletic Association. It is the highest inter-schools hurling competition in Ireland, and has been contested every year, except on two occasions, since 1944.

The All-Ireland final, usually held in March, serves as the culmination of a knockout series of games played in February and March. Currently, qualification for the All-Ireland series is limited to teams competing in Connacht, Leinster and Munster. Eligible players must be under the age of 19.

The title has been won at least once by 17 different schools, nine of which have won the title more than once. The all-time record-holders are St Kieran's College, who have won the competition 26 times.

St Kieran's College are the current champions, having beaten Presentation College Athenry in the 2026 All-Ireland final.

== History ==
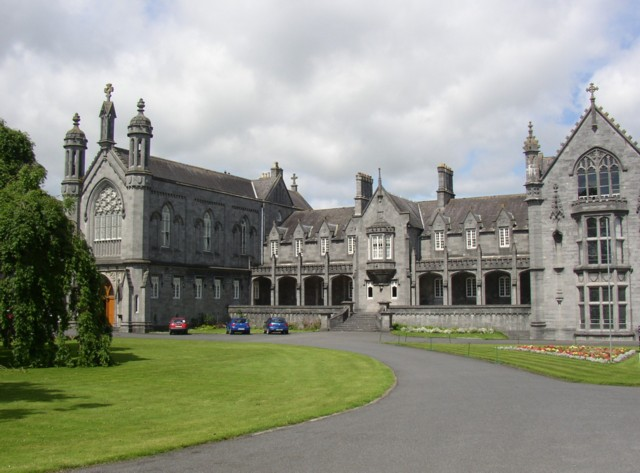
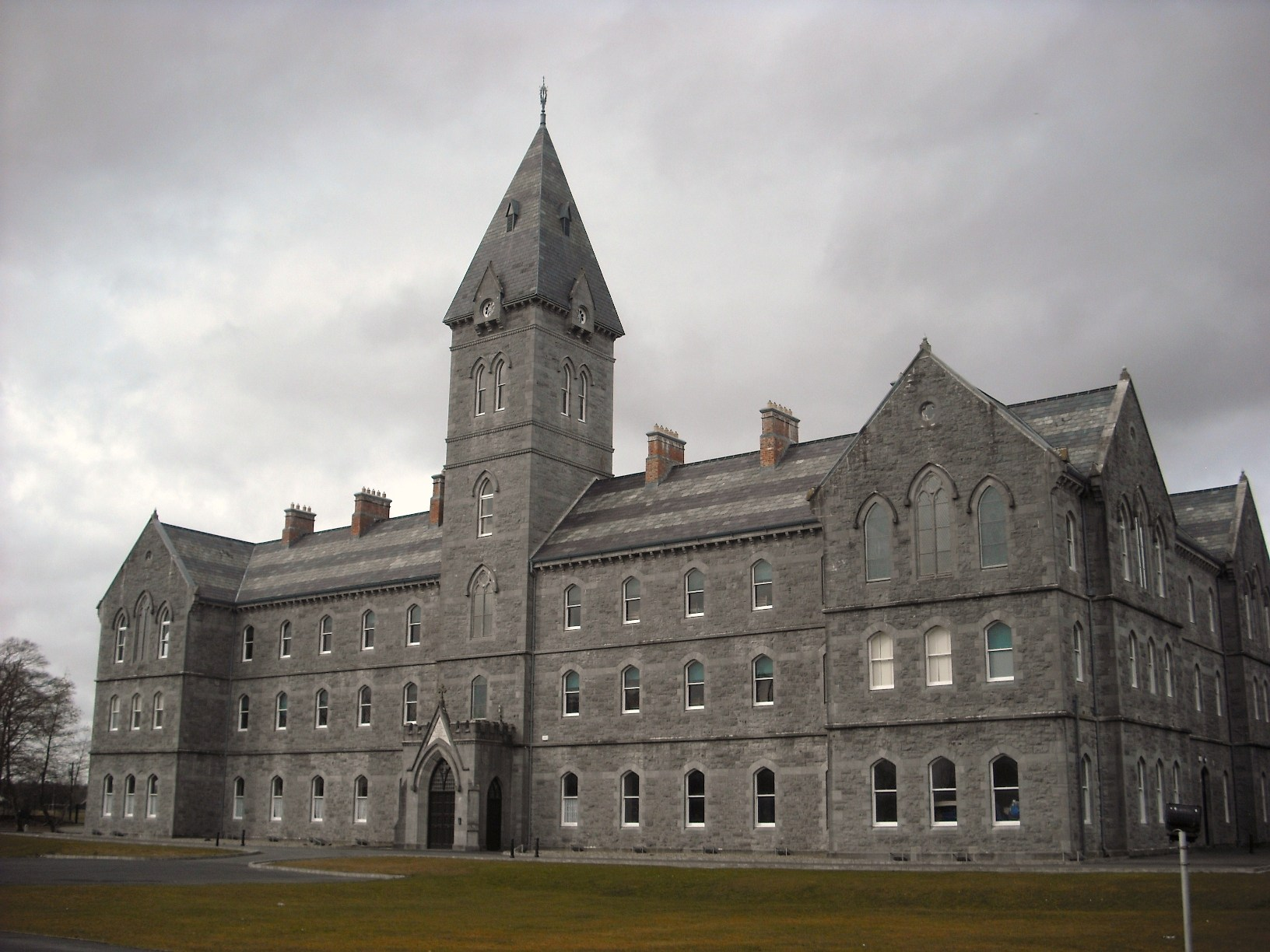
St Kieran's College (left) and St Flannan's College (right) have won 38 All-Ireland titles between them.

Inter-colleges hurling competitions had been played since 1918, with the Leinster Championship and Dr Harty Cup both being formed that year. A similar competition had been running in Connacht since 1938. Participation in these competitions was limited to voluntary secondary schools. Similarly, an annual inter-provincial competition between Connacht, Leinster and Munster had been taking place, with the best college players from the respective provinces being picked to form the teams. It wasn't until 1944 that the Leinster and Munster champions faced each other to decide the All-Ireland champions. St Flannan's College beat St Kieran's College by 5–05 to 3–03 to claim the inaugural title. It was the first of a record-setting four successive All-Ireland titles for St Flannan's College.

St Kieran's College became the second team to win the All-Ireland title, however, the championship was suspended following their victory over St Colman's College in 1948. The championship was reintroduced in 1957, with representatives from the Connacht Championship being allowed to contest the All-Ireland series for the first time. Representatives from the Ulster Championship were allowed to contest the All-Ireland series for the first time in 1964, however, their participation was shortlived.

The Croke Cup has seen a keen rivalry develop between St Flannan's College and St Kieran's College. By 1999, both colleges had won 13 All-Ireland titles. In spite of this, other colleges have enjoyed multiple successes at various times throughout the history of the competition. The North Monastery, St Finbarr's College and St Colman's College brought 10 All-Ireland titles to County Cork between 1960 and 1977. St Peter's College, Wexford won four All-Ireland titles from six All-Ireland finals appearances between 1960 and 1973, while Limerick CBS claimed two victories from four consecutive finals appearances between 1964 and 1967. County Tipperary wrote their name into the All-Ireland roll of honour when Templemore CBS claimed the title in 1978, while St Brendan's Community School from County Offaly won their sole Croke Cup in 1986. The Leinster-Munster stranglehold on the competition was broken in 1995 when St. Raphael's College became the first college from County Galway to claim the All-Ireland title.

The turn of the century has seen St Kieran's College dominate by winning 11 titles between 2000 and 2023. Amalgamated teams have also enjoyed successes during this period, with Dublin colleges claiming the title in 2006 and Dungarvan colleges winning in 2013. Amalgamated teams were later precluded from participating in the All-Ireland series, however, vocational schools were permitted to field teams in the competition after a merger with the All-Ireland VS SAHC in 2014. By that stage, the championship had undergone a further expansion when the introduction of a "back door system" in 2005 allowed the defeated Leinster and Munster finalists entry into the All-Ireland series for the first time. The "back door system" was extended to the Connacht runners-up in 2014. The Croke Cup was suspended mid-championship in 2020 and not held in 2021 due to the COVID-19 pandemic.

== Current format ==
=== Qualification ===
Province	Championship	Teams progressing
Connacht	Connacht GAA PPS Senior A Hurling Championship	Champions and runners-up
Leinster	Leinster GAA PPS Senior A Hurling Championship	Champions and runners-up
Munster	Dr Harty Cup	Champions and runners-up

=== Championship ===
The championship features six teams in a knockout series of games. Two teams receive byes to the All-Ireland semi-finals, while the other four teams play each other in two All-Ireland quarter-finals. This is organised on a strict rotational basis between the Connacht, Leinster and Munster teams. Teams who have met each other in the respective provincial championships are precluded from meeting each other until the All-Ireland final.

== Sponsorship ==
Masita became the title sponsor of the championship in 2013. The competition was previously sponsored by Coca-Cola.

== Trophy and medals ==
The Dr Croke Cup is the current prize for winning the All-Ireland final. It was commissioned to honour Thomas Croke (1824–1902), who was the Archbishop of Cashel and Emly and one of the first patrons of the Gaelic Athletic Association.

Traditionally, the victory presentation takes place at a special rostrum in the main grandstand of the stadium. The winning captain accepts the cup on behalf of his team before giving a short speech. Individual members of the winning team then have an opportunity to come to the rostrum to lift the cup, which is held by the winning team until the following year's final. In accordance with GAA rules, a set of gold medals is awarded to the championship winners.

== Roll of honour ==
#	Team	County	Won	Years won
1	St Kieran's College	Kilkenny	26	1948, 1957, 1959, 1961, 1965, 1971, 1975, 1988, 1989, 1990, 1992, 1993, 1996, 2000, 2003, 2004, 2010, 2011, 2014, 2015, 2016, 2018, 2019, 2023, 2024, 2026
2	St Flannan's College	Clare	14	1944, 1945, 1946, 1947, 1958, 1976, 1979, 1982, 1983, 1987, 1991, 1998, 1999, 2005
3	North Monastery	Cork	5	1960, 1970, 1980, 1985, 1994
3	St Finbarr's College	Cork	5	1963, 1969, 1972, 1974, 1984
4	St Peter's College	Wexford	4	1962, 1967, 1968, 1973
4	St Colman's College	Cork	4	1977, 1997, 2001, 2002
5	Thurles CBS	Tipperary	2	2009, 2025
5	Limerick CBS	Limerick	2	1964, 1966
5	DLS College Waterford	Waterford	2	2007, 2008
6	Templemore CBS	Tipperary	1	1978
6	Kilkenny CBS	Kilkenny	1	1981
6	St Brendan's CS	Offaly	1	1986
6	St Raphael's College	Galway	1	1995
6	Dublin Colleges	Dublin	1	2006
6	Nenagh CBS	Tipperary	1	2012
6	Dungarvan Colleges	Waterford	1	2013
6	Our Lady's SS	Tipperary	1	2017
6	Ardscoil Rís	Limerick	1	2022

== List of finals ==
Year	Winners	Score	Runners-up	Score
1944	St Flannan's College	5-05	St Kieran's College	3-03
1945	St Flannan's College	7-10	St Joseph's CBS	2-03
1946	St Flannan's College	5-07	O'Connell School	5-02
1947	St Flannan's College	6-08	Cistercian College	3-01
1948	St Kieran's College	2-12	St Colman's College	2-02
1949	No competition			
1950	No competition			
1951	No competition			
1952	No competition			
1953	No competition			
1954	No competition			
1955	No competition			
1956	No competition			
1957	St Kieran's College	4-02	St Flannan's College	2-07
1958	St Flannan's College	3-10	St Kieran's College	0-02
1959	St Kieran's College	2-13	Tipperary CBS	4-02
1960	North Monastery	1-09	St Peter's College	1-04
1961	St Kieran's College	8-08	North Monastery	1-04
1962	St Peter's College	4-11	Rice College	2-04
1963	St Finbarr's College	4-08	Patrician College	3-04
1964	Limerick CBS	6-07	St Peter's College	4-05
1965	St Kieran's College	6-09	Limerick CBS	6-01
1966	Limerick CBS	8-09	St Mary's College	2-02
1967	St Peter's College	5-11	Limerick CBS	3-06
1968	St Peter's College	5-10	Coláiste Chríost Rí	4-05
1969	St Finbarr's College	5-15	St Kieran's College	2-01
1970	North Monastery	2-13	Kilkenny CBS	2-08
1971	St Kieran's College	8-06	St Finbarr's College	5-08
1972	St Finbarr's College	3-07	St Kieran's College	2-05
1973	St Peter's College	4-15	Our Lady's College, Gort	1-05
1974	St Finbarr's College	2-11	St Kieran's College	1-12
1975	St Kieran's College	6-09	Colaiste Iognaid Ris, Cork	2-03
1976	St Flannan's College	3-09	Presentation College, Athenry	1-07
1977	St Colman's College	2-13	St Kieran's College	1-09
1978	Templemore CBS	2-11	St Peter's College	1-04
1979	St Flannan's College	3-15	Presentation College, Birr	2-03
1980	North Monastery	5-11	St Brendan's Community School	3-07
1981	Kilkenny CBS	3-05	North Monastery	1-08
1982	St Flannan's College	2-09	St Peter's College	0-10
1983	St Flannan's College	0-16	Kilkenny CBS	2-04
1984	St Finbarr's College	1-15	St Kieran's College	0-08
1985	North Monastery	4-11	Birr Community School	1-05
1986	Birr Community School	5-08	North Monastery	1-08
1987	St Flannan's College	4-11	St Kieran's College	1-07
1988	St Kieran's College	3-10	Midleton CBS	2-07
1989	St Kieran's College	3-05	St Flannan's College	1-09
1990	St Kieran's College	2-10	St Flannan's College	0-07
1991	St Flannan's College	1-15	St Kieran's College	1-09
1992	St Kieran's College	1-07	St Colman's College	0-08
1993	St Kieran's College	3-15	Our Lady's, Gort	1-10
1994	North Monastery	1-10	St Mary's College	1-06
1995	St Raphael's College	3-10	Midleton CBS	3-05
1996	St Kieran's College	1-14	St Colman's College	2-06
1997	St Colman's College	4-20	Good Counsel College	0-09
1998	St Flannan's College	2-16	St Raphael's College	1-11
1999	St Flannan's College	2-15	St Kieran's College	2-10
2000	St Kieran's College	1-10	St Flannan's College	0-09
2001	St Colman's College	2-10	Gort Community School	2-07
2002	St Colman's College	0-11	St Kieran's College	2-04
2003	St Kieran's College	1-15	St Colman's College	1-04
2004	St Kieran's College	3-20	St Raphael's College	1-06
2005	St Flannan's College	2-15	St Kieran's College	2-12
2006	Dublin Colleges	1-11	St Flannan's College	0-11
2007	De La Salle College, Waterford	0-13	Kilkenny CBS	1-09
2008	De La Salle College, Waterford	2-12, 2-09 (R)	Thurles CBS	1-15, 2-08 (R)
2009	Thurles CBS	1-17	Good Counsel College	1-15
2010	St Kieran's College	2-11	Ardscoil Rís	2-08
2011	St Kieran's College	2-10	Ardscoil Rís	1-11
2012	Nenagh CBS	3-10	Kilkenny CBS	2-11
2013	Dungarvan Colleges	1-12	Kilkenny CBS	1-07
2014	St Kieran's College	2-16	Kilkenny CBS	0-13
2015	St Kieran's College	1-15	Thurles CBS	1-12
2016	St Kieran's College	1-15	Ardscoil Rís	1-13
2017	Our Lady's SS	3-13	St Kieran's College	3-11
2018	St Kieran's College	5-19	Presentation College, Athenry	3-16
2019	St Kieran's College	1-15	Presentation College, Athenry	1-12
2020	No competition due to the impact of the COVID-19 pandemic on Gaelic games.			
2021	No competition due to the impact of the COVID-19 pandemic on Gaelic games.			
2022	Ardscoil Rís	1-17	St Kieran's College	0-15
2023	St Kieran's College	3-13	Presentation College, Athenry	0-12
2024	St Kieran's College	0-26	St Raphael's College	1-18
2025	Thurles CBS	0-24	Presentation College, Athenry	2-17
2026	St Kieran's College	3-19	Presentation College, Athenry	2-16

== Records and statistics ==
=== Final ===
- Most wins: 26:
  - St Kieran's College (1948, 1957, 1959, 1961, 1965, 1971, 1975, 1988, 1989, 1990, 1992, 1993, 1996, 2000, 2003, 2004, 2010, 2011, 2014, 2015, 2016, 2018, 2019, 2023, 2024, 2026)
- Most consecutive wins: 4:
  - St Flannan's College (1944, 1945, 1946, 1947)
- Most second-place finishes: 13:
  - St Kieran's College (1944, 1969, 1972, 1974, 1977, 1984, 1987, 1991, 1999, 2002, 2005, 2017, 2022)
- Most consecutive second-place finishes: 3:
  - Kilkenny CBS (2012, 2013, 2014)
- Most appearances: 39:
  - St Kieran's College (1944, 1948, 1957, 1959, 1961, 1965, 1969, 1971, 1972, 1974, 1975, 1977, 1984, 1987, 1988, 1989, 1990, 1991, 1992, 1993, 1996, 1999, 2000, 2002, 2003, 2004, 2005, 2010, 2011, 2014, 2015, 2016, 2017, 2018, 2019, 2022, 2023, 2024, 2026)
- Most appearances without winning: 6:
  - Presentation College, Athenry (1976, 2018, 2019, 2023, 2024, 2026)

=== Teams ===
==== By decade ====
The most successful college of each decade, judged by number of championship titles, is as follows:

- 1940s: 4 for St Flannan's College (1944-45-46-47)
- 1950s: 2 for St Kieran's College (1957-59)
- 1960s: 3 for St Peter's College (1962-67-68)
- 1970s: 2 each for St Kieran's College (1971-75), St Finbarr's College (1972-74) and St Flannan's College (1976-79)
- 1980s: 3 for St Flannan's College (1982-83-87)
- 1990s: 4 for St Kieran's College (1990-92-93-96)
- 2000s: 3 for St Kieran's College (2000-03-04)
- 2010s: 7 for St Kieran's College (2010-11-14-15-16-18-19)
- 2020s: 2 for St Kieran's College (2023-24)

==== Gaps ====
Longest gaps between successive championship titles:

- 20 years: St Colman's College (1977-1997)
- 18 years: St Flannan's College (1958-1976)
- 13 years: St Kieran's College (1975-1988)
- 11 years: St Flannan's College (1947-1958)
- 10 years: North Monastery (1960-1970)
- 10 years: North Monastery (1970-1980)
- 10 years: St Finbarr's College (1974-1984)
- 9 years: St Kieran's College (1948-1957)
- 9 years: North Monastery (1985-1994)

=== Top scorers ===
==== All time ====
As of 2023 Croke Cup

#	Name	Team(s)	Goals	Points	Total
1	Jack Aylmer	St Kieran's College	4	37	49
2	Stephen Power	DLS College	4	36	48
3	Harry Shine	St Kieran's College	4	24	36

==== In finals ====
#	Player	Team	Final	Score	Total
1	Bernie McMahon	St Flannan's College	1947	4-02	14
1	Frank O'Brien	St Finbarr's College	1969	4-02	14
1	Andrew O'Shaughnessy	St Colman's College	2001	2-08	14
1	Tony O'Sullivan	North Monastery	1980	2-08	14
5	Joe Ryan	St Kieran's College	1971	4-00	12
5	D. J. Carey	St Kieran's College	1989	3-03	12
5	Richard Grace	Limerick CBS	1967	2-06	12
5	Richie Power	St Kieran's College	2004	1-09	12
5	Mark Kennedy	Presentation College	2018	1-09	12
5	Pádraig Kennedy	St Flannan's College	1958	1-09	12

== See also ==
- All-Ireland Colleges Interprovincial Hurling Championship
- All-Ireland PPS Senior B Hurling Championship
