= 1983 Croke Cup =

Irish hurling competition

- Dates: 24 April - 8 May 1983
- Teams: 3
- Champions: St Flannan's College (9th title); Ray Sampson (captain)
- Runners-up: Kilkenny CBS

Tournament statistics
- Matches played: 2
- Goals scored: 6 (3 per match)
- Points scored: 38 (19 per match)
- Top scorer(s): Timmy Murnane (1-07)

The 1983 Croke Cup was the 32nd staging of the Croke Cup since its establishment by the Gaelic Athletic Association in 1944. The competition ran from 24 April to 8 May 1983.

St Flannan's College were the defending champions.

The final was played on 8 May 1983 at Semple Stadium, Thurles, between St Flannan's College and Kilkenny CBS, in what was their first ever meeting in the final. St Flannan's College won the match by 0–16 to 2–04 to claim their ninth Croke Cup title and a second title in succession.

Timmy Murnane was the top scorer with 1-07.

== Qualification ==
Province	Champions
Connacht	St Joseph's College
Leinster	Kilkenny CBS
Munster	St Flannan's College

== Results ==
=== Semi-final ===
24 April 1983 Semi-final	St Flannan's College	4-07 - 0-11	St Joseph's College	MacDonagh Park
	T Murnane 1-5, A Hanley 2-0, D McInerney 1-1, R Sampson 0-1.		M Shiels 0-5, PJ Lynch 0-2, T Monaghan 0-2, G Noone 0-1, G Curley 0-1.

=== Final ===
9 May 1983 Final	St Flannan's College	0-16 - 2-04	Kilkenny CBS	Semple Stadium
	D Quirke 0-8, T Quinlivan 0-2, N Romer 0-2, T Murnane 0-2, D McInerney 0-1, E O'Flaherty 0-1.		E O'Leary 1-2, P Cass 1-0, R Moran 0-1, B Walsh 0-1.	Referee: J Moloney (Tipperary)

== Statistics ==
=== Top scorers ===
Overall

Rank	Player	County	Tally	Total	Matches	Average
1	Timmy Murnane	St Flannan's College	1-07	10	2	5.00
2	Dick Quirke	St Flannan's College	0-08	8	2	4.00
3	Andrew Hanley	St Flannan's College	2-00	6	2	3.00
