= 1997 Croke Cup =

Irish hurling competition

- Dates: 13–27 April 1997
- Teams: 4
- Champions: St Colman's College (2nd title); Luke Mannix (captain); Denis Ring (manager)
- Runners-up: Good Counsel College

Tournament statistics
- Matches played: 3
- Goals scored: 14 (4.67 per match)
- Points scored: 70 (23.33 per match)
- Top scorer(s): Neil Ronan (3-18)

The 1997 Croke Cup was the 46th staging of the Croke Cup since its establishment by the Gaelic Athletic Association in 1944. The competition ran from 13 April to 27 April 1997.

St Kieran's College were the defending champions, however, they were beaten by Good Counsel College in the Leinster final.

The final was played on 27 April 1997 at Croke Park in Dublin, between St Colman's College and Good Counsel College, in what was their first ever meeting in the final. St Colman's College won the match by 4–20 to 0–09 to claim their second Croke Cup title overall and a first title in 20 years.

Neil Ronan was the top scorer with 3–18.

== Qualification ==
Province	Champions
Connacht	St. Raphael's College
Leinster	Good Counsel College
Munster	St Colman's College
Ulster	St Mary's CBGS

== Results ==
=== Semi-finals ===
13 April 1997 Semi-final	St Colman's College	4-18 - 1-06	St Mary's CBGS	O'Connor Park
	N Ronan 2-11, E Fitzgerald 2-3, I Gardiner 0-1, J O'Driscoll 0-1, S Kearney 0-1, D McInerney 0-1.		T McGuire 0-4, C McGee 1-0, J Flynn 0-2.	Referee: A Mac Suibhne (Dublin)

13 April 1997 Semi-final	Good Counsel College	4-10 - 1-07	St. Raphael's College	MacDonagh Park
	P Sheehan 2-2, M Doyle 0-7, R Codd 1-0, T Howlin 1-0, M O'Neill 0-1.		K Colleran 1-0, G Carey 0-3, E McMahon 0-2, E Rocks 0-1, K Daniels 0-1.	Referee: TJ Corby (Tipperary)

=== Final ===
27 April 1997 Final	St Colman's College	4-20 - 0-09	Good Counsel College	Croke Park
	N Ronan 1-7, E Fitzgerald 2-3, J O'Driscoll 1-6, C O'Kane 0-1, I Gardiner 0-1, P Cotter 0-1, L Mannix 0-1.		M Doyle 0-6, P Sheehan 0-2, T Howlin 0-1.	Referee: P Horan (Offaly)

== Statistics ==
=== Top scorers ===
Overall

Rank	Player	County	Tally	Total	Matches	Average
1	Neil Ronan	St Colman's College	3-18	27	2	13.50
2	Eoin Fitzgerald	St Colman's College	4-06	18	2	9.00
3	Michael Doyle	Good Counsel College	0-13	13	2	6.50
4	Paul Sheehan	Good Counsel College	2-04	10	2	5.00
4	Jerome O'Driscoll	St Colman's College	1-07	10	2	5.00
