= 1963 Croke Cup =

Irish hurling competition

- Dates: 7 April - 5 May 1963
- Teams: 3
- Champions: St Finbarr's College (1st title); Connie O'Leary (captain); Christy Ring (manager)
- Runners-up: Patrician College, Ballyfin; Pat Bradley (captain)

Tournament statistics
- Matches played: 2
- Goals scored: 15 (7.5 per match)
- Points scored: 30 (15 per match)
- Top scorer(s): Seánie Barry (4-05)

The 1963 Croke Cup was the 12th staging of the Croke Cup since its establishment by the Gaelic Athletic Association in 1944. The competition ran from 7 April to 5 May 1963.

St Peter's College were the defending champions, however, they were beaten in the Leinster Championship.

The final was played on 5 May 1963 at Croke Park in Dublin, between St Finbarr's College and Patrician College, in what was their first ever meeting in the final. St Finbarr's College won the match by 4–08 to 3–04 to claim their first ever Croke Cup title.

Seánie Barry was the top scorer with 4-05.

== Qualification ==
Province	Champions
Connacht	St Mary's College
Leinster	Patrician College
Munster	St Finbarr's College

== Results ==
=== Semi-final ===
7 April 1963 Semi-final	St Finbarr's College	7-09 - 2-06	St Mary's College	Gaelic Grounds
	J Dineen 3-1, S Barry 2-1, D Harrington 1-0, J Hennessy 1-0, T McEvoy 0-2, C O'Leary 0-2, M Donegan 0-1, L McAuliffe 0-1, P Crowley 0-1.		P O'Toole 2-1, F Coffey 0-3, T Canavan 0-2.

=== Final ===
5 May 1963 Final	St Finbarr's College	4-08 - 2-04	Patrician College	Croke Park
	S Barry 2-4, M Donegan 1-1, J Dineen 1-0, C O'Leary 0-1, D Harrington 0-1, T McEvoy 0-1.		D Hayes 1-0, R Niland 1-0, N Mahony 1-0, P Bradley 0-3, S Gaffney 0-1.	Referee: S Gleeson (Limerick)

== Statistics ==
=== Top scorers ===
Overall

Rank	Player	County	Tally	Total	Matches	Average
1	Seánie Barry	St Finbarr's College	4-05	17	2	8.50
2	John Dineen	St Finbarr's College	4-01	13	2	6.50
3	Pat O'Toole	Patrician College	2-01	7	2	3.50
