= 1977 Croke Cup =

Irish hurling competition

- Dates: 3 April - 1 May 1977
- Teams: 3
- Champions: St Colman's College (1st title); John Lenihan (captain)
- Runners-up: St Kieran's College

Tournament statistics
- Matches played: 2
- Goals scored: 7 (3.5 per match)
- Points scored: 35 (17.5 per match)
- Top scorer(s): John Mangan (2-02)

The 1977 Croke Cup was the 26th staging of the Croke Cup since its establishment by the Gaelic Athletic Association in 1944. The competition ran from 3 April to 1 May 1977.

St Flannan's College were the defending champions, however, they were beaten by St Colman's College in the Harty Cup final.

The final was played on 1 May 1977 at Semple Stadium in Thurles, between St Colman's College and St Kieran's College, in what was their first ever meeting in the final. St Colman's College won the match by 2–13 to 1–09 to claim their first ever Croke Cup title.

John Mangan was the top scorer with 2-02.

== Qualification ==
Province	Champions
Connacht	Presentation College
Leinster	St Kieran's College
Munster	St Colman's College

== Results ==
=== Semi-final ===
3 April 1977 Semi-final	St Colman's College	2-10 - 2-03	Presentation College	MacDonagh Park
	J Mangan 1-2, J Monaghan 1-0, M Mellerick 0-2, W Cashman 0-2, G O'Regan 0-2, J Hartnett 0-2.		J Ryan 1-1, N Burke 1-0, P Ryan 0-1, L Kennedy 0-1.

=== Final ===
1 May 1977 Final	St Colman's College	2-13 - 1-09	St Kieran's College	Semple Stadium
	G O'Regan 0-5, J Mangan 1-0, M Mellerick 1-0, J Hartnett 0-2, J Boylan 0-2, T Murphy 0-1, W Cashman 0-1, S O'Brien 0-1, J Monaghan 0-1.		N Kelly 1-0, P Gannon 0-3, G Ryan 0-3, M Morrissey 0-2, M McGrath 0-1.

== Statistics ==
=== Top scorers ===
Overall

Rank	Player	County	Tally	Total	Matches	Average
1	John Mangan	St Colman's College	2-02	8	2	4.00
2	Gerard O'Regan	St Colman's College	0-07	7	2	3.50
3	Michael Mellerick	St Colman's College	1-02	5	2	2.50
