= 1981 Croke Cup =

Irish hurling competition

- Dates: 12 April - 10 May 1981
- Teams: 3
- Champions: Kilkenny CBS (1st title); Paul Cleere (captain); Brother Minniter (manager)
- Runners-up: North Monastery; John Drinan (captain); Donal O'Grady (manager); Murt Murphy (manager)

Tournament statistics
- Matches played: 2
- Goals scored: 5 (2.5 per match)
- Points scored: 26 (13 per match)
- Top scorer(s): Michael Lawlor (2-00)

The 1981 Croke Cup was the 30th staging of the Croke Cup since its establishment by the Gaelic Athletic Association in 1944. The competition ran from 12 April to 10 May 1981.

North Monastery were the defending champions.

The final was played on 10 May 1981 at Walsh Park in Waterford, between Kilkenny CBS and the North Monastery, in what was their first ever meeting in the final. Kilkenny CBS won the match by 3–05 to 1–08 to claim their first ever Croke Cup title.

Michael Lawlor was the top scorer with 2-00.

== Qualification ==
Province	Champions
Connacht	Our Lady's College
Leinster	Kilkenny CBS
Munster	North Monastery

== Results ==
=== Semi-final ===
12 April 1981 Semi-final	North Monastery	1-09 - 0-04	Our Lady's College	Semple Stadium
	J Chisholm 1-1, D McCarthy 0-3, J Drinan 0-2, T O'Mahony 0-1, T McCarthy 0-1, D Geaney 0-1.		A Cunningham 0-3, J O'Byrne 0-1.	Referee: N Dalton (Waterford)

=== Final ===
10 May 1981 Final	Kilkenny CBS	3-05 - 1-08	North Monastery	Walsh Park
	M Lawlor 2-0, T Bawle 1-1, S O'Leary 0-4.		T O'Mahony 1-1, J Drinan 0-2, R Allen 0-2, T McCarthy 0-1, J Chisholm 0-1, P Connery 0-1.	Referee: J Moloney (Tipperary)

== Statistics ==
=== Top scorers ===
Overall

Rank	Player	County	Tally	Total	Matches	Average
1	Michael Lawlor	Kilkenny CBS	2-00	6	1	6.00
2	John Chisholm	North Monastery	1-02	5	2	2.50
2	Terry O'Mahony	North Monastery	1-02	5	2	2.50
