= 1985 Croke Cup =

Irish hurling competition

- Dates: 21 April - 19 May 1985
- Teams: 3
- Champions: North Monastery (5th title); Frank Horgan (captain)
- Runners-up: St Brendan's Community School; Ray Kelly (captain)

Tournament statistics
- Matches played: 3
- Goals scored: 12 (4 per match)
- Points scored: 45 (15 per match)
- Top scorer(s): Frank Horgan (4-01)

The 1985 Croke Cup was the 34th staging of the Croke Cup since its establishment by the Gaelic Athletic Association in 1944. The competition ran from 21 April to 19 May 1985.

St Finbarr's College were the defending champions, however, they were beaten by St Flannan's College in the Harty Cup quarter-final.

The final, a replay, was played on 19 May 1985 at the Gaelic Grounds in Limerick, between the North Monastery and St Brendan's Community School, in what was their first ever meeting in the final. North Monastery won the match by 4–11 to 1–05 to claim their fourth Croke Cup title overall and a first title in five years.

Frank Horgan was the top scorer with 4-01.

== Qualification ==
Province	Champions
Connacht	St Joseph's College
Leinster	St Brendan's Community School
Munster	North Monastery

== Results ==
=== Semi-final ===
21 April 1985 Semi-final	North Monastery	2-11 - 0-07	St Joseph's College	Gaelic Grounds
	R Feeney 1-1, K Cotter 0-4, F Horgan 1-0, K McGuckian 0-3, G O'Riordan 0-2, T O'Keeffe 0-1.		M Duignan 0-3, A Ryan 0-2, E Lynch 0-2.

=== Final ===
12 May 1985 Final	North Monastery	2-07 - 3-04	St Brendan's Community School	O'Moore Park
	D O'Brien 2-0, G O'Riordan 0-2, K Cotter 0-2, R Feeney 0-1, F Horgan 0-1, P O'Neill 0-1.		G Cahill 1-2, D Cleere 1-0, N Gath 1-0, D Pilkington 0-1, B Guinan 0-1.

19 May 1985 Final replay	North Monastery	4-11 - 1-05	St Brendan's Community School	Gaelic Grounds
	F Horgan 3-0, D O'Brien 1-2, K Cotter 0-4, T O'Keeffe 0-2, R Feeney 0-1, D Murphy 0-1, J O'Riordan 0-1.		N Gath 1-0, B Guinan 0-2, G Cahill 0-1, D Cleere 0-1, E Regan 0-1.	Referee: S Brennan (Galway)

== Statistics ==
=== Top scorers ===
Overall

Rank	Player	County	Tally	Total	Matches	Average
1	Frank Horgan	North Monastery	4-01	13	3	4.33
2	Donncha O'Brien	North Monastery	3-02	11	3	3.66
3	Ken Cotter	North Monastery	0-10	10	3	3.33
4	Niall Gath	St Brendan's CS	2-00	6	2	3.00
4	Gary Cahill	St Brendan's CS	1-03	6	2	3.00
4	Rodney Feeney	North Monastery	1-03	6	3	2.00
