= 1969 Croke Cup =

Irish hurling competition

- Dates: 20–27 April 1969
- Teams: 3
- Champions: St Finbarr's College (3rd title); Donie Collins (captain)
- Runners-up: St Kieran's College; Michael O'Shea (captain)

Tournament statistics
- Matches played: 2
- Goals scored: 19 (9.5 per match)
- Points scored: 27 (13.5 per match)
- Top scorer(s): Frank O'Brien (7-04)

The 1969 Croke Cup was the 18th staging of the Croke Cup since its establishment by the Gaelic Athletic Association in 1944. The competition ran from 20 April to 27 April 1969.

St Peter's College were the defending champions, however, they were beaten in the Leinster Championship.

The final was played on 27 April 1969 at Thurles Sportsfield, between St Finbarr's College and St Kieran's College, in what was their first ever meeting in the final. St Finbarr's College won the match by 5–15 to 2–01 to claim their second Croke Cup title overall and a first title in six years.

Frank O'Brien was the top scorer with 7-04.

== Qualification ==
Province	Champions
Connacht	Our Lady's College
Leinster	St Kieran's College
Munster	St Finbarr's College

== Results ==
=== Semi-final ===
20 April 1969 Semi-final	St Finbarr's College	9-10 - 3-01	Our Lady's College	Thurles Sportsfield
	F O'Brien 3-2, K O'Driscoll 3-0, P Lucey 1-1, T Crowley 1-1, J Hegarty 1-0, D Collins 0-3, N Crowley 0-3.		B Brennan 2-0, M Donoghue 1-0, M O'Connor 0-1.	Referee: J Moloney (Tipperary)

=== Final ===
26 April 1969 Final	St Finbarr's College	5-15 - 2-01	St Kieran's College	Thurles Sportsfield
	F O'Brien 4-2, D Collins 0-6, N Crowley 0-6, J Hegarty 1-0, P Lucey 0-1.		J Prendergast 1-1, J Mahon 1-0.	Referee: J Moloney (Tipperary)

== Statistics ==
=== Top scorers ===
Overall

Rank	Player	County	Tally	Total	Matches	Average
1	Frank O'Brien	St Finbarr's College	7-04	25	2	12.50
2	Kieran O'Driscoll	St Finbarr's College	3-00	9	2	4.50
2	Donie Collins	St Finbarr's College	0-09	9	2	4.50
2	Noel Crowley	St Finbarr's College	0-09	9	2	4.50
