= 1968 Croke Cup =

Irish hurling competition

- Dates: 7 April - 19 May 1968
- Teams: 3
- Champions: St Peter's College (3rd title); Paddy Breen (captain)
- Runners-up: Coláiste Chríost Rí; Brendan Cummins (captain)

Tournament statistics
- Matches played: 3
- Goals scored: 22 (7.33 per match)
- Points scored: 43 (14.33 per match)
- Top scorer(s): Dan Callanan (2-08)

The 1968 Croke Cup was the 17th staging of the Croke Cup since its establishment by the Gaelic Athletic Association in 1944. The competition ran from 7 April to 19 May 1968.

St Peter's College were the defending champions.

The final, a replay, was played on 19 May 1968 at Croke Park in Dublin, between St Peter's College and Coláiste Chríost Rí, in what was their first ever meeting in the final. St Peter's College won the match by 5–10 to 4–05 to claim their third Croke Cup title overall and a second title in succession.

Dan Callanan was the top scorer with 2-08.

== Qualification ==
Province	Champions
Connacht	St Joseph's College
Leinster	St Peter's College
Munster	Coláiste Chríost Rí

== Results ==
=== Semi-final ===
7 April 1968 Semi-final	St Peter's College	4-14 - 2-05	St Joseph's College	O'Moore Park
	W French 1-5, J Kavanagh 1-2, P Lawless 1-2, M Byrne 1-0, M Casey 0-2, A Kavanagh 0-1, M Quigley 0-1, P Kennedy 0-1.		T Frehill 1-3, N Kilroy 1-0, S Silke 0-1, J Lyons 0-1.

=== Final ===
12 May 1968 Final	St Peter's College	4-03 - 3-06	Coláiste Chríost Rí	Clonmel Sportsground
	M Casey 1-2, J Kavanagh 1-0, M Byrne 1-0, D O'Brien 1-0, M Quigley 0-1.		D Callanan 2-4, N Callanan 1-0, P Mackey 0-2.

19 May 1968 Final replay	St Peter's College	5-10 - 4-05	Coláiste Chríost Rí	Croke Park
	M Quigley 1-4, D O'Brien 2-0, M Casey 1-2, M Byrne 1-1, W French 0-2, J Kavanagh 0-1.		E Fitzpatrick 2-0, D Callanan 0-4, N Callanan 1-0, S Looney 1-0, P Mackey 0-1.

== Statistics ==
=== Top scorers ===
Overall

Rank	Player	County	Tally	Total	Matches	Average
1	Dan Callanan	Coláiste Chríost Rí	2-08	14	2	7.00
2	Martin Casey	St Peter's College	2-06	12	3	4.00
3	Martin Byrne	St Peter's College	3-01	10	3	3.33
3	Watty French	St Peter's College	1-07	10	3	3.33
5	Joe Kavanagh	St Peter's College	2-03	9	3	3.00
5	Martin Quigley	St Peter's College	1-06	9	3	3.00
