= 1948 Croke Cup =

Irish hurling competition

- Dates: 2 May 1948
- Teams: 2
- Champions: St Kieran's College (1st title); Lar Dunphy (captain)
- Runners-up: St Colman's College; Liam Abernethy (captain)

Tournament statistics
- Matches played: 1
- Goals scored: 4 (4 per match)
- Points scored: 14 (14 per match)
- Top scorer(s): Jim Mahony (2-00); Lar Dunphy (1-03)

The 1948 Croke Cup was the fifth staging of the Croke Cup since its establishment by the Gaelic Athletic Association in 1944.

St Flannan's College were the defending champions, however, they were beaten by St Colman's College in a replay of the Harty Cup final.

The final was played on 2 May 1948 at Croke Park in Dublin, between St Kieran's College and St Colman's College, in what was their first ever meeting in the final. St Kieran's College won the match by 2–12 to 2–02 to claim their first ever Croke Cup title.

== Qualification ==
Province	Champions
Leinster	St Kieran's College
Munster	St Colman's College

== Results ==
=== Final ===
2 May 1948 Final	St Kieran's College	2-12 - 2-02	St Colman's College	Croke Park
	J Mahony 2-0, L Dunphy 1-3, W Bennett 0-4, G O'Malley 0-2, T Connolly 0-2, W Hoban 0-1.		L Abernethy 1-1, L Moore 1-0, B Troy 0-1.
