= 1957 Croke Cup =

Irish hurling competition

- Dates: 7–28 April 1957
- Teams: 3
- Champions: St Kieran's College (2nd title); Ted Carroll (captain); Tommy Maher (manager)
- Runners-up: St Flannan's College

Tournament statistics
- Matches played: 2
- Goals scored: 14 (7 per match)
- Points scored: 19 (9.5 per match)
- Top scorer(s): Brendan Hennessy (2-02)

The 1957 Croke Cup was the sixth staging of the Croke Cup since its establishment by the Gaelic Athletic Association in 1944. The competition ran from 7 April to 28 April 1957.

St Kieran's College were the defending champions, having won the competition before its suspension in 1948. Representatives from the Connacht Championship were allowed to contest the All-Ireland series for the first time.

The final was played on 28 April 1957 at Croke Park in Dublin, between St Kieran's College and St Flannan's College, in what was their second meeting in the final and a first meeting in 13 years. St Kieran's College won the match by 4–02 to 2–07 to claim their second Croke Cup title overall and a first title in nine years.

Brendan Hennessy was the top scorer with 2-02.

== Qualification ==
Province	Champions
Connacht	St Mary's College
Leinster	St Kieran's College
Munster	St Flannan's College

== Results ==
=== Semi-final ===
7 April 1957 Semi-final	St Mary's College	1-06 - 7-04	St Flannan's College	Galway
	S Conroy 0-4, P Finnegan 1-0, S Fallon 0-2.		B Hennessy 2-1, P Nealon 2-0, T Ryan 1-0, F Custy 1-0, J Devlin 1-0, P Kennedy 0-1, M Deasy 0-1, O Naughton 0-1.

=== Final ===
28 April 1957 Final	St Kieran's College	4-02 - 2-07	St Flannan's College	Croke Park
	D Walsh 1-0, E Keher 1-0, T White 0-1, D Dowling 1-0, M Walsh 0-2.		F Custy 1-0, J Devlin 1-0, P Kennedy 0-3, B Hennessy 0-1, P Nealon 0-1, J Slattery 0-1, T Ryan 0-1.	Referee: L Flaherty (Galway)
