= 1947 Croke Cup =

Irish hurling competition

- Dates: 4 May 1947
- Teams: 2
- Champions: St Flannan's College (4th title); Jimmy Smyth (captain)
- Runners-up: Cistercian College, Roscrea

Tournament statistics
- Matches played: 1
- Goals scored: 9 (9 per match)
- Points scored: 9 (9 per match)
- Top scorer(s): Bernie McMahon (4-02)

The 1947 Croke Cup was the fourth staging of the Croke Cup since its establishment by the Gaelic Athletic Association in 1944.

St Flannan's College were the defending champions.

The final was played on 4 May 1947 at Thurles Sportsfield, between St Flannan's College and Cistercian College, Roscrea, in what was their first ever meeting in the final. St Flannan's College won the match by 6–08 to 3–01 to claim their fourth successive Croke Cup title.

== Qualification ==
Province	Champions
Leinster	Cistercian College, Roscrea
Munster	St Flannan's College

== Results ==
=== Final ===
4 May 1947 Final	St Flannan's College	6-08 - 3-01	Cistercian College, Roscrea	Thurles Sportsfield
	B McMahon 4-2, J Smyth 1-5, T Feely 1-0, J Kenny 0-1.		S Murphy 2-0, V Cowen 1-0, L O'Meara 0-1.
