= 1945 Croke Cup =

Irish hurling competition

- Dates: 29 April 1944
- Teams: 2
- Champions: St Flannan's College (2nd title)
- Runners-up: St Joseph's, Fairview

Tournament statistics
- Matches played: 1
- Goals scored: 9 (9 per match)
- Points scored: 13 (13 per match)
- Top scorer(s): D. McNamara (2-01)

The 1945 Croke Cup was the second staging of the Croke Cup since its establishment by the Gaelic Athletic Association in 1944.

St Flannan's College were the defending champions.

The final was played on 29 April 1945 at Croke Park in Dublin, between St Flannan's College and St Joseph's, Fairview, in what was their first ever meeting in the final. St Flannan's College won the match by 7–10 to 2–03 to claim their second successive Croke Cup title.

== Qualification ==
Province	Champions
Leinster	St Joseph's, Fairview
Munster	St Flannan's College

== Results ==
=== Final ===
29 April 1945 Final	St Flannan's College	7-10 - 2-03	St Joseph's, Fairview	Croke Park
	D McNamara 2-1, B O'Donoghue 2-0, J Bugler 1-2, H O'Meara 0-4, J Dooley 1-0, J O'Grady 1-0, J Ryan 0-2, J Hanley 0-1.		K Heffernan 2-0, P Donnelly 0-1, D Healy 0-1, S McLoughlin 0-1.
