= 1962 Croke Cup =

Irish hurling competition

- Dates: 1 April - 6 May 1962
- Teams: 3
- Champions: St Peter's College (1st title); Michael Rossiter (captain)
- Runners-up: Rice College

Tournament statistics
- Matches played: 3
- Goals scored: 13 (4.33 per match)
- Points scored: 40 (13.33 per match)
- Top scorer(s): Pat Quigley (1-10)

The 1962 Croke Cup was the 11th staging of the Croke Cup since its establishment by the Gaelic Athletic Association in 1944. The competition ran from 1 April to 6 May 1962.

St Kieran's College were the defending champions, however, they were beaten in the Leinster Championship.

The final, a replay, was played on 6 May 1962 at Croke Park in Dublin, between St Peter's College and Rice College, in what was their first ever meeting in the final. St Peter's College won the match by 4–11 to 2–04 to claim their first ever Croke Cup title.

Pat Quigley was the top scorer with 1-10.

== Qualification ==
Province	Champions
Connacht	St Molaise's College
Leinster	St Peter's College
Munster	Rice College

== Results ==
=== Semi-final ===
1 April 1962 Semi-final	St Peter's College	4-08 - 1-03	St Molaise's College	Nowlan Park
	J Kennedy 2-0, P Quigley 1-3, M Rossiter 1-1, E Doyle 0-3, D O'Neill 0-1.		N Lane 1-0, P Mannion 0-1, M Burke 0-1, T O'Hara 0-1.

=== Final ===
15 April 1962 Final	St Peter's College	0-10 - 2-04	Rice College	Thurles Sportsfield
	E Doyle 0-6, P Quigley 0-2, C O'Rafferty 0-2.		V Loftus 1-1, S McMahon 1-0, G Stack 0-1, M Maher 0-1, M Hanrahan 0-1.

6 May 1962 Final replay	St Peter's College	4-11 - 2-04	Rice College	Thurles Sportsfield
	C O'Rafferty 1-5, P Quigley 0-5, D O'Neill 1-0, W Foley 1-0, P Cullen 1-0, M Kinsella 0-1.		D Guerin 2-0, V Hogan 0-2, V Loftus 0-1, M O'Hanrahan 0-1.

== Statistics ==
=== Top scorers ===
Overall

Rank	Player	County	Tally	Total	Matches	Average
1	Pat Quigley	St Peter's College	1-10	13	3	4.33
2	Conor O'Rafferty	St Peter's College	1-07	10	3	3.33
3	Éamonn Doyle	St Peter's College	0-09	9	3	3.00
