= 1965 Croke Cup =

Irish hurling competition

- Dates: 2–16 May 1965
- Teams: 3
- Champions: St Kieran's College (5th title); Tom Nolan (captain)
- Runners-up: Limerick CBS

Tournament statistics
- Matches played: 2
- Goals scored: 22 (11 per match)
- Points scored: 25 (12.5 per match)
- Top scorer(s): Frank Power (3-04)

The 1965 Croke Cup was the 14th staging of the Croke Cup since its establishment by the Gaelic Athletic Association in 1944. The competition ran from 2 May to 16 May 1965.

Limerick CBS were the defending champions.

The final was played on 16 May 1965 at Clonmel Sportsground, between St Kieran's College and Limerick CBS, in what was their first ever meeting in the final. St Kieran's College won the match by 6–09 to 6–01 to claim a record-equalling fifth Croke Cup title and a first title in four years.

Frank Power was the top scorer with 3-04.

== Qualification ==
Province	Champions
Connacht	St Mary's College
Leinster	St Kieran's College
Munster	Limerick CBS

== Results ==
=== Semi-final ===
2 May 1965 Semi-final	St Kieran's College	5-08 - 5-07	St Mary's College	Croke Park
	M Delaney 2-0, T Holohan 1-3, F Power 1-3, R Prendergast 1-2.		A Rabbitte 2-0, P Fahy 2-0, J Gibbons 1-0, A Henry 0-3, J McLoughlin 0-3, M O'Connell 0-1.

=== Final ===
16 May 1965 Final	St Kieran's College	6-09 - 6-01	Limerick CBS	Croke Park
	F Power 2-1, R Prendergast 1-4, T Nolan 2-0, B Butler 1-1, M Delaney 0-2, D Freaney 0-1.		É Grimes 3-0, T Clohessy 1-1, L Ryan 1-0, M Grace 1-0.	Referee: A Higgins (Galway)

== Statistics ==
=== Top scorers ===
Overall

Rank	Player	County	Tally	Total	Matches	Average
1	Frank Power	St Kieran's College	3-04	13	2	6.50
2	Ray Prendergast	St Kieran's College	2-06	12	2	6.00
3	Éamonn Grimes	Limerick CBS	3-00	9	2	4.50
