= 1991 Croke Cup =

Irish hurling competition

- Dates: 13–27 April 1991
- Teams: 3
- Champions: St Flannan's College (11th title); Thomas Corbett (captain)
- Runners-up: St Kieran's College; Andy Comerford (captain)

Tournament statistics
- Matches played: 2
- Goals scored: 3 (1.5 per match)
- Points scored: 40 (20 per match)
- Top scorer(s): Bernard Scanlon (0-10)

The 1991 Croke Cup was the 40th staging of the Croke Cup since its establishment by the Gaelic Athletic Association in 1944. The competition ran from 13 April to 27 April 1991.

St Kieran's College were the defending champions.

The final was played on 27 April 1991 at Semple Stadium in Thurles, between St Flannan's College and St Kieran's College, in what was their seventh meeting in the final overall and a third consecutive meeting. St Flannan's College won the match by 1–15 to 1–09 to claim a record-breaking 11th Croke Cup title overall and a first title in four years.

== Qualification ==
Province	Champions
Connacht	St. Raphael's College
Leinster	St Kieran's College
Munster	St Flannan's College

== Results ==
=== Semi-final ===
13 April 1991 Semi-final	St Flannan's College	1-07 - 0-09	St. Raphael's College	Whitegate Grounds
	B Scanlon 0-4, M Daly 1-0, C O'Doherty 0-1, G Quinlan 0-1, F O'Connor 0-1.		M Headd 0-5, T Kavanagh 0-1, J Murray 0-1, D Keane 0-1, J Flanagan 0-1.	Referee: D Murphy (Wexford)

=== Final ===
27 April 1991 Final	St Flannan's College	1-15 - 1-09	St Kieran's College	Semple Stadium
	M Daly 1-3, B Scanlon 0-6, F O'Connor 0-2, J Healy 0-1, R O'Hara 0-1, T Corbett 0-1, C O'Doherty 0-1.		PJ Delaney 0-7, D Hurley 1-0, A Comerford 0-1, B Kenny 0-1.	Referee: P Delaney (Laois)

Overall

Rank	Player	County	Tally	Total	Matches	Average
1	Bernard Scanlon	St Flannan's College	0-10	10	2	5.00
2	Martin Daly	St Flannan's College	2-03	9	2	4.50
3	P. J. Delaney	St Kieran's College	0-07	7	1	7.00
