= 1990 Croke Cup =

Irish hurling competition

- Dates: 15 April - 6 May 1990
- Teams: 3
- Champions: St Kieran's College (10th title); Noel Maher (captain)
- Runners-up: St Flannan's College; Jamesie O'Connor (captain)

Tournament statistics
- Matches played: 2
- Goals scored: 8 (4 per match)
- Points scored: 27 (13.5 per match)
- Top scorer(s): Andy Comerford (1-08)

The 1990 Croke Cup was the 39th staging of the Croke Cup since its establishment by the Gaelic Athletic Association in 1944. The competition ran from 15 April to 6 May 1990.

St Kieran's College were the defending champions.

The final was played on 6 May 1990 at the Mitchelstown Grounds, between St Kieran's College and St Flannan's College, in what was their sixth meeting in the final overall and a second consecutive meeting. St Kieran's College won the match by 2–10 to 0–07 to claim a record-equalling 10th Croke Cup title overall and a third title in succession.

Andy Comerford was the top scorer with 1-08.

== Qualification ==
Province	Champions
Connacht	St Mary's College
Leinster	St Kieran's College
Munster	St Flannan's College

== Results ==
=== Semi-final ===
15 April 1990 Semi-final	St Kieran's College	4-07 - 2-03	St Mary's College	St Brendan's Park
	A Comerford 1-5, C Brennan 1-0, PJ Delaney 1-0, M Casey 1-0, P Larkin 0-1, S Ryan 0-1.		D Moore 1-0, K Greally 1-0, P Howley 0-2, J O'Brien 0-1.

=== Final ===
6 May 1990 Final	St Kieran's College	2-10 - 0-07	St Flannan's College	Mitchelstown Grounds
	PJ Delaney 2-0, A Comerford 0-3, J Dermody 0-2, N Maher 0-2, P Purcell 0-1, S Ryan 0-1, C Brennan 0-1.		J O'Connor 0-3, D McCarthy 0-2, L Meaney 0-1, T McEnery 0-1.

== Statistics ==
=== Top scorers ===
Overall

Rank	Player	County	Tally	Total	Matches	Average
1	Andy Comerford	St Kieran's College	1-08	11	2	5.50
2	P. J. Delaney	St Kieran's College	3-00	9	2	4.50
3	Canice Brennan	St Kieran's College	1-01	4	2	2.00
