= Gort Community School =

School in County Galway, Ireland

Gort Community School (Irish: Pobalscoil Ghort Inse Guaire) is a secondary school in Gort in County Galway, Ireland. Founded in 1995, as of 2025, the school had over 1000 pupils enrolled and the principal was Brian Crossan.

Denis Corry was principal in 2010 when an extension, called the Noone Building, was opened and included new dressing rooms, a music room, a career guidance suite and an oratory. In 2022, the design for a further extension was approved by the Department of Education, and was projected to include new class rooms, special education rooms, science laboratories and general purpose and fitness areas.

In 2022, the school was included in the top 10 shortlist of the "supporting healthy lives" category of the "World's Best School Prizes" program.

== Alumni ==
- Lisa McInerney (b. 1981) - novelist, short story writer, essayist, editor and screenwriter
- Niall Donohue (1990-2013) - hurler
- Cianan Fahy (b. 1998) - hurler
