= MacDonagh Park =

Stadium in Ireland

- Páirc Mhic Dhonncha
- Interactive map of MacDonagh Park
- Location: Gortlandroe, Nenagh, County Tipperary, Ireland
- Coordinates: 52.866863°N 8.215265°W
- Public transit: Nenagh railway station
- Owner: Nenagh Éire Óg GAA
- Field size: 145 x 90 m

Website
- www.nenagheireog.com

MacDonagh Park is a GAA stadium in Nenagh, County Tipperary, Ireland. It is the home ground of the Nenagh Éire Óg club and has often been used for inter-county matches, including some of Tipperary's National Hurling League fixtures.

== See also ==
- List of Gaelic Athletic Association stadiums
