= 2016 Croke Cup =

Irish hurling competition

- Dates: 6–28 March 2016
- Teams: 6
- Sponsor: Masita
- Champions: St Kieran's College (21st title); Tommy Walsh (captain)
- Runners-up: Ardscoil Rís; Peter Casey (captain); Jerome Boylan (captain)

Tournament statistics
- Matches played: 5
- Goals scored: 10 (2 per match)
- Points scored: 155 (31 per match)
- Top scorer(s): Paul O'Brien (0-22)

The 2016 Croke Cup was the 65th staging of the Croke Cup since its establishment by the Gaelic Athletic Association in 1944. The competition ran from 6 March to 28 March 2016.

St Kieran's College were the defending champions.

The final was played on 28 March 2016 at Semple Stadium in Thurles, between St Kieran's College and Ardscoil Rís, in what was their third meeting in the final overall and a first meeting in five tears. St Kieran's College won the match by 1–15 to 1–13 to claim their 21st Croke Cup title overall and a third successive title.

Paul O'Brien was the top scorer with 0-22.

== Qualification ==
Province	Champions	Runners-up
Connacht	Presentation College	Gort Community School
Leinster	St Kieran's College	Kilkenny CBS
Munster	Ardscoil Rís, Limerick	Our Lady's SS

== Results ==
=== Quarter-finals ===
5 March 2016 Quarter-final	Our Lady's Secondary School	1-18 - 0-14	Gort Community School	FitzGerald Park
	J Bergin 0-7 (6f); A Ryan 1-2; B McGrath (frees), L Fairbrother 0-3 each; D O’Shea, J Kelly, P Cadell 0-1 each.	Report	C Noonan 0-6f; C Fahy 0-3 (2f); E Fahy, E Egan (1 s-cut) 0-2 each; C O’Shea 0-1.	Referee: C McAllister (Cork)

8 March 2016 Quarter-final	Ardscoil Rís	3-15 - 1-13	Kilkenny CBS	Páirc Shíleáin
	P O’Loughlin 2-0, P Casey & P O’Brien (3f, 1 65) 0-5 each, C Boylan 1-1, D Carroll & D Fitzgerald 0-2 each.	Report	S Bolger 0-6 (2f, 1 65), B Sheehan 1-1, N Brassil 0-2, S Mahony, J McEvoy, J Molloy & R Buckley 0-1 each.	Referee: F Horgan (Tipperary)

=== Semi-finals ===
12 March 2016 Semi-final	Ardscoil Rís	1-18 - 0-20	Presentation College	Gurteen Grounds
	P O’Brien 0-10 (8f, 1’65), C Boylan 1-1, P O’Loughlin 0-4, P Casey 0-2, B Ryan 0-1.	Report	E Niland 0-9 (8f, 1’65), P Foley 0-4, S Loftus 0-2, B Concannon 0-2, L Forde 0-2, R Hardiman 0-1.	Referee: J Ryan (Tipperary)

12 March 2016 Semi-final	St Kieran's College	2-16 - 0-13	Our Lady's Secondary School	Clonmel Sportsground
	A Mullen 0-7 (6f), C Prendiville 1-3, J Cuddihy 1-1, M Cody, E Delaney, J Connolly, S Carey & E Moylan 0-1 each.	Report	B McGrath 0-5 (3f, 1 65), J Bergin 0-3f, J Kelly 0-2, D O’Shea, S Nolan & L Fairbrother 0-1 each.	Referee: J Keane (Galway)

=== Final ===
28 March 2016 Final	St Kieran's College	1-15 - 1-13	Ardscoil Rís	Semple Stadium
	J Cuddihy (1-3); A Mullen (0-5, 0-2 frees); E Delaney, J Connolly (0-2 each); M Keoghan, E Moylan, C Prendiville (0-1).		P O’Brien (0-7, 0-7 frees); P O’Loughlin (1-2); C Boylan (0-2); B Ryan, D Cunningham (0-1).	Referee: D Kirwan (Cork)

== Statistics ==
=== Top scorers ===
Rank	Player	Club	Tally	Total	Matches	Average
1	Paul O'Brien	Ardscoil Rís	0-22	22	3	7.33
2	Paddy O'Loughlin	Ardscoil Rís	3-06	15	3	5.00
3	Adrian Mullen	St Kieran's College	0-12	12	3	4.00
4	Joe Cuddihy	St Kieran's College	2-04	10	2	5.00
4	Conor Boylan	Ardscoil Rís	2-04	10	3	3.33
4	Colum Prendiville	St Kieran's College	1-07	10	2	5.00
4	Jamie Bergin	Our Lady's SS	0-10	10	2	5.00
