= 2024 Croke Cup =

Irish hurling competition

- Dates: 17 February - 17 March 2024
- Teams: 6
- Sponsor: Masita
- Champions: St Kieran's College (25th title); Jeff Neary (captain); Stephen Manogue (captain); Brian Dowling (manager)
- Runners-up: St Raphael's College; Paudie McCarry (captain); Francis Forde (manager)

Tournament statistics
- Matches played: 5
- Goals scored: 13 (2.6 per match)
- Points scored: 163 (32.6 per match)
- Top scorer(s): Marc O'Brien (1-15)

The 2024 All-Ireland Post Primary Schools Croke Cup was the 71st staging of the Croke Cup since its establishment by the Gaelic Athletic Association in 1944. The competition ran from 17 February to 16 March 2024.

St Kieran's College were the defending champions.

The final was played on 16 March 2024 at Croke Park in Dublin, between St Kieran's College and St Raphael's College, in what was their first ever meeting in the final. St Kieran's College won the match by 0–26 to 1–18 to claim their 25th Croke Cup title overall and a second consecutive title.

Sophie Myers was the top scorer with 6-7

== Qualification ==
Province	Champions	Runners-up
Connacht	St Raphael's College	Presentation College
Leinster	St Kieran's College	Kilkenny CBS
Munster	St Joseph's CBS, Nenagh	Ardscoil Rís

== Results ==
=== Quarter-finals ===
17 February 2024 Quarter-final	St Joseph's CBS, Nenagh	3-19 - 2-11	Kilkenny CBS	Kelly O'Daly Park
	D McCarthy (2 frees), E Doughan (4 frees) 0-6 each; Joe O’Dwyer 1-1; D Quinn, D Treacy 1-0 each; M Cawley 0-3; C Foley 0-2; A Duff 0-1.	Report	R Corcoran 0-5 (3 frees); E O Casaide, S Culleton 1-0 each; M Stynes 0-2 (1 free); G Kelly (pen), A Clifford, P Lacey B Moore 0-1 each.	Referee: P Dunne (Laois)

18 February 2024 Quarter-final	Ardscoil Rís	1-14 - 1-09	Presentation College, Athenry	Páirc an Dálaigh
	M O'Brien 1-9 (0-6 frees), P Kearney 0-2, D Chaplin 0-1(0-1 free), F Fitzgerald and J Cosgrove 0-1 each.	Report	A Nilland 0-5 (0-4 frees), C Leen 1-0, D Kearney 0-2, O Burke and J Rabbitte 0-1 each.	Referee: M Farrell (Roscommon)

=== Semi-finals ===
2 March 2024 Semi-final	St Raphael's College	1-20 - 3-13	St Joseph's CBS, Nenagh	Páirc an Dálaigh
	P MacCárthaigh (0-8), B Feeney (1-3, 3fs), C Killeen (0-3), V Morgan, E Mulleady (0-2 each), D MacCárthaigh, L McInerney (0-1 each).	Report	D McCarthy (0-11, 9fs, ‘65), A O’Connor (2-0), D Quinn (1-0), J Hackett, Z Keller (0-1 each).	Referee: E Stapleton (Limerick)

2 March 2024 Semi-final	St Kieran's College	1-19 - 0-14	Ardscoil Rís	Canon Hayes Park
	A McEvoy (0-6, 6 frees); S Hunt (1-2); R Glynn (0-4); S Manogue (free), J Neary, T McPhillips, T Roche, E Lauhoff, T Brennan, J Hughes (0-1 each).	Report	M O’Brien (0-6, 4 frees, 1 65); M Collins (0-3); F Fitzgerald (0-2, 1 free); E Begley, C Lohan, D Chaplin (0-1 each).	Referee: A Tierney (Tipperary)

=== Final ===
16 March 2024 Final	St Kieran's College	0-26 - 1-18 (aet)	St Raphael's College	Croke Park
	A McEvoy 0-8 (4fs, 1 ‘65’), S Hunt, R Glynn 0-4 each, J Hughes 0-3, E Lauhoff, C Brennan 0-2, S Bergin, E McDermott, B McDermott 0-1 each.	Report	V Morgan 1-3, B Feeney 0-5 (5fs), P Mac Carthaigh 0-5, C Killeen 0-2, O O’Gorman, D Mac Carthaigh, L McInerney 0-1 each.	Referee: J Keenan (Wicklow)

== Statistics ==
=== Top scorers ===
Rank	Player	County	Tally	Total	Matches	Average
1	Marc O'Brien	Ardscoil Rís	1-15	18	2	9.00
2	Darragh McCarthy	St Joseph's CBS	0-17	17	2	8.50
3	Aaron McEvoy	St Kieran's College	0-14	14	2	7.00
4	Paddy Mac Cárthaigh	St Raphael's College	0-13	13	2	6.50
5	Bobby Feeney	St Raphael's College	1-08	11	2	5.50
6	Seán Hunt	St Kieran's College	1-06	9	2	4.50
7	Vince Morgan	St Raphael's College	1-05	8	2	4.00
7	Rory Glynn	St Kieran's College	0-08	8	2	4.00
9	Joe Greene	St Kieran’s college	2-00	6	2	3.00
9	Eoghan Doughan	St Joseph's CBS	0-06	6	2	3.00
