= 2019 Croke Cup =

Irish hurling competition

- Dates: 2–30 March 2019
- Teams: 6
- Sponsor: Masita
- Champions: St Kieran's College (23rd title); Conor Murphy (captain); Tom Hogan (manager)
- Runners-up: Presentation College; Mike Finn (manager)

Tournament statistics
- Matches played: 5
- Goals scored: 9 (1.8 per match)
- Points scored: 123 (24.6 per match)
- Top scorer(s): Mark Kennedy (2-14)

The 2019 All-Ireland Post Primary Schools Croke Cup was the 68th staging of the Croke Cup since its establishment by the Gaelic Athletic Association in 1944. The competition ran from 2 March to 30 March 2019.

St Kieran's College were the defending champions.

The final was played on 30 March 2019 at O'Connor Park in Tullamore, between St Kieran's College and Presentation College, Athenry, in what was their second meeting in the final overall and a second successive meeting. St Kieran's College won the match by 1–15 to 1–12 to claim their 23rd Croke Cup title overall and a second title in succession.

Mark Kennedy was the top scorer with 2–14.

== Qualification ==
Province	Champions	Runners-up
Connacht	Presentation College	Gort Community School
Leinster	St Kieran's College	Coláiste Eoin
Munster	Midleton CBS	Christian Brothers College, Cork

== Results ==
=== Quarter-finals ===
2 March 2019 Quarter-final	Christian Brothers College, Cork	1-13 - 1-07	Gort Community School	FitzGerald Park
	S Barrett (0-7 0-6 frees, 0-1 sl), R Cotter (1-2), I Daly (0-2), C Long (free) and O McCarthy (0-1 each).	Report	P Cummins (0-4 frees), E Egan (1-0), J Linnane (0-2), O Flannery (0-1).	Referee: D O'Callaghan (Limerick)

6 March 2019 Quarter-final	Midleton CBS Secondary School	1-14 - 1-12	Coláiste Eoin	Nowlan Park
	R McCarthy (0-10, 6 frees, 2 sidelines, 1 65); J Hankard (1-1); R O’Regan (0-2); S Quirke (0-1)	Report	S Ó Fiachna (1-3, 2 frees); P Ó Luanacháin (0-4, 2 65s); D Mac Duinnsléibhe (0-2); D Mac Giolla Bhríde, P Puirséil, O Mac Gearailt (0-1 each).	Referee: D Hughes (Carlow)

=== Semi-finals ===
18 March 2019 Semi-final	Presentation College, Athenry	1-12 - 2-06	Midleton CBS Secondary School	FitzGerald Park
	M Kennedy (1-6, 0-3 frees, 0-1 ‘65); TJ Brennan, A Clarke (0-2 each); A Brett, G Lee (0-1 each).	Report	R McCarthy (1-3, 1-0 pen, 0-3 frees); J Stack (0-3); R O’Regan (1-0).	Referee: F Horgan (Tipperary)

20 March 2019 Semi-final	St Kieran's College	0-17 - 0-15	Christian Brothers College, Cork	Waterford IT Sports Campus
	E Cody 0-8 (5fs), A Brennan 0-3, D Blanchfield, M O’Connell 0-2 each, C Kenny, C Hoban 0-1 each.	Report	S Barrett 0-7 (7fs), K Finn, P Power 0-2 each, C O’Donovan, D Hanlon, C Long (f), J O’Kelly 0-1 each.	Referee: D O'Callaghan (Limerick)

=== Final ===
30 March 2019 Final	St Kieran's College	1-15 - 1-12	Presentation College, Athenry	O'Connor Park
	E Cody 0-8 (0-6f), C Kelly 1-0, D Blanchfield & K Egan 0-2 each, M O’Connell, C Brennan & A Brennan 0-1 each.	Report	M Kennedy 1-8 (0-5f), TJ Brennan 0-2, G Lee & A Clarke 0-1 each.	Referee: J Murphy (Limerick)

== Statistics ==
=== Top scorers ===
Overall

Rank	Player	Club	Tally	Total	Matches	Average
1	Mark Kennedy	Presentation College	1-13	16	2	8.00
2	Ryan McCarthy	Midleton CBS	1-13	16	2	8.00
2	Eoin Cody	St Kieran's College	0-16	16	2	8.00
4	Shane Barrett	CBC Cork	0-14	14	2	7.00
5	Séamus Ó Fiachna	Coláiste Eoin	1-03	6	1	6.00

In a single game

Rank	Player	Club	Tally	Total	Opposition
1	Mark Kennedy	Presentation College	1-08	11	St Kieran's College
2	Ryan McCarthy	Midleton CBS	0-10	10	Coláiste Eoin
3	Mark Kennedy	Presentation College	1-06	9	Midleton CBS
4	Eoin Cody	St Kieran's College	0-08	8	CBC Cork
4	Eoin Cody	St Kieran's College	0-08	8	Presentation College
6	Shane Barrett	CBC Cork	0-07	7	Gort Community School
6	Shane Barrett	CBC Cork	0-07	7	St Kieran's College
8	Séamus Ó Fiachna	Coláiste Eoin	1-03	6	Midleton CBS
8	Ryan McCarthy	Midleton CBS	1-03	6	Presentation College
10	Robbie Cotter	CBC Cork	1-02	5	Gort Community School
