= 2014 Croke Cup =

Irish hurling competition

- Dates: 15 March - 5 April 2014
- Teams: 6
- Sponsor: Masita
- Champions: St Kieran's College (19th title); James Maher (captain); Liam Smith (manager)
- Runners-up: Kilkenny CBS; Darragh Holohan (captain); Niall Tyrrell (manager)

Tournament statistics
- Matches played: 5
- Goals scored: 19 (3.8 per match)
- Points scored: 142 (28.4 per match)
- Top scorer(s): Colin Ryan (0-17)

The 2014 Croke Cup was the 63rd staging of the Croke Cup since its establishment by the Gaelic Athletic Association in 1944. The competition ran from 15 March to 5 April 2014.

Dungarvan Colleges were the defending champions, however, that amalgamated team disbanded. The Connacht Championship runners-up were allowed to contest the All-Ireland series for the first time.

The final was played on 5 April 2014 at Nowlan Park in Kilkenny, between St Kieran's College and Kilkenny CBS, in what was their first ever meeting in the final but their second meeting that season. St Kieran's College won the match by 2–16 to 0–13 to claim their 19th Croke Cup title overall and their first title in three years.

Colin Ryan was the top scorer with 0–17.

== Qualification ==
Province	Champions	Runners-up
Connacht	Presentation College	St Brigid's College
Leinster	Kilkenny CBS	St Kieran's College
Munster	Ardscoil Rís	Scoil na Tríonóide Naofa

== Results ==
=== Quarter-finals ===
15 March 2014 Quarter-final	Scoil na Tríonóide Naofa	3-13 - 1-15	Presentation College	Gurteen Grounds
	C Ryan 0-8 (6fs), D Coleman 1-2, B Murphy, M Coleman 1-0 each, J Lonergan, S O'Connell, S Ryan 0-1 each.	Report	B Concannon 1-1, E Niland, B Burke (4fs), R Doyle (4fs) 0-4 each, C Burke, C Shaughnessey 0-1 each.	Referee: F Horgan (Tipperary)

15 March 2014 Quarter-final	St Kieran's College	4-22 - 2-22	St Brigid's College	St Brendan's Park
	J Maher 1-4, C O'Carroll 2-1, C Murphy 0-6 (3fs, 1 '65), T O'Dwyer 1-1, L Blanchfield, B Cody 0-3 each, K Blanchfield 0-2, R Leahy, B Ryan 0-1 each.	Report	B Molloy 0-14 (8fs), E Burke 1-4 (0-1f), J Conroy 1-0, J Mannion 0-3, L Kelly 0-1.	Referee: C McAllister (Cork)

=== Semi-finals ===
22 March 2014 Semi-final	St Kieran's College	4-10 - 1-12	Ardscoil Rís	Páirc Shíleaín
	T O'Dwyer, R Donnelly (0-1f) 1-3 each, B Fitzpatrick (o-g), C O'Carroll 1-0 each, C Murphy 0-2, K Blanchfield, E Walsh 0-1 each.	Report	R Lynch 1-6 (0-5fs), C Fitzgerald 0-3, C McCarthy 0-2, I Galvin 0-1.	Referee: F Horgan (Tipperary)

22 March 2014 Semi-final	Kilkenny CBS	2-09 - 0-10	Scoil na Tríonóide Naofa	Páirc Shíleaín
	A Gaffney 2-2 (0-2fs), R Buckley 0-2, JP Treacy 0-2 (1f), H Lawlor, L Scanlon, M McWey 0-1 each.	Report	C Ryan 0-9 (8fs), D Coleman 0-1.	Referee: C Browne (Galway)

=== Final ===
5 April 2014 Final	St Kieran's College	2-16 - 0-13	Kilkenny CBS	Nowlan Park
	T O'Dwyer 1-3, C Murphy (4fs), R Donnelly (4fs) 0-4 each, B Cody 1-1, S Morrissey 0-3, J Cleere 0-1.		A Gaffney (4fs, 1 '65'), L Scanlon 0-5 each, J Lenihan 0-2, P Deegan 0-1.	Referee: A Kelly (Galway)

== Statistics ==
=== Top scorers ===
Rank	Player	Club	Tally	Total	Matches	Average
1	Colin Ryan	Scoil na Tríonóide Naofa	0-17	17	2	8.50
2	Tadhg O'Dwyer	St Kieran's College	3-07	16	3	5.33
3	Brian Molloy	St Brigid's College	0-14	14	1	14.00
4	Andrew Gaffney	Kilkenny CBS	2-07	13	2	6.50
5	Conor Murphy	St Kieran's College	0-12	12	3	4.00
6	Conor O'Carroll	St Kieran's College	3-01	10	3	3.33
6	Rob Donnelly	St Kieran's College	1-07	10	3	3.33
8	Ronan Lynch	Ardscoil Rís	1-06	9	1	9.00
