= 1996 Croke Cup =

Irish hurling competition

- Dates: 31 March - 28 April 1996
- Teams: 4
- Champions: St Kieran's College (1st title); David Carroll (captain); Denis Philpott (manager)
- Runners-up: St Colman's College; Timmy McCarthy (captain); Denis Ring (manager)

Tournament statistics
- Matches played: 3
- Goals scored: 6 (2 per match)
- Points scored: 64 (21.33 per match)
- Top scorer(s): Timmy McCarthy (0-13)

The 1996 Croke Cup was the 45th staging of the Croke Cup since its establishment by the Gaelic Athletic Association in 1944. The competition ran from 31 March to 28 April 1996.

St. Raphael's College were the defending champions, however, they were beaten by St Colman's College in the All-Ireland semi-final.

The final was played on 28 April 1996 at Croke Park in Dublin, between St Kieran's College and St Colman's College, in what was their fourth meeting in the final overall and a first meeting in four years. St Kieran's College won the match by 1–14 to 2–06 to claim their 13th Croke Cup title overall and a first title in three years.

Timmy McCarthy was the top scorer with 0-13.

== Qualification ==
Province	Champions
Connacht	St. Raphael's College
Leinster	St Kieran's College
Munster	St Colman's College
Ulster	St Mary's CBGS

== Results ==
=== Semi-finals ===
31 March 1996 Semi-final	St Kieran's College	0-18 - 0-04	St Mary's CBGS	Páirc Tailteann
	J Coogan 0-7, J Staunton 0-5, P Delaney 0-2, G Kennedy 0-2, D Fahy 0-1, B O'Shea 0-1.		J Flynn 0-2, R Gamble 0-1, C Magee 0-1.	Referee: A Mac Suibhne (Dublin)

31 March 1996 Semi-final	St Colman's College	1-15 - 2-07	St. Raphael's College	MacDonagh Park
	T McCarthy 0-11, D Barry 1-1, W O'Donoghue 0-2, J McCarthy 0-1.		V Maher 1-1, C Earls 0-4, N Kelly 1-0, N Shiel 0-1, C Hynes 0-1.	Referee: J McDonnell (Tipperary)

=== Final ===
28 April 1996 Final	St Kieran's College	1-14 - 2-06	St Colman's College	Croke Park
	W Maher 1-2, J Coogan 0-3, J Staunton 0-2, P Delaney 0-2, T O'Dowd 0-1, H Shefflin 0-1, D Fahy 0-1, D Carroll 0-1, J McEvoy 0-1.		W O'Donoghue 2-1, T McCarthy 0-2, L Mannix 0-1, J Murray 0-1, E Pierce 0-1.	Referee: A Mac Suibhne (Dublin)

== Statistics ==
=== Top scorers ===
Overall

Rank	Player	County	Tally	Total	Matches	Average
1	Timmy McCarthy	St Colman's College	0-13	13	2	6.50
2	Jimmy Coogan	St Kieran's College	0-10	10	2	5.00
3	Will O'Donoghue	St Colman's College	2-03	9	2	4.50
4	John Staunton	St Kieran's College	0-07	7	2	3.50
5	William Maher	St Kieran's College	1-02	5	1	5.00
