= Eoin Cody =

Irish hurler (born 2000)

Personal information
- Native name: Eoin Mac Óda (Irish)
- Born: 12 September 2000 (age 26) Ballyhale, County Kilkenny, Ireland
- Height: 6 ft 1 in (185 cm)

Sport
- Sport: Hurling
- Position: Corner-forward
Club*
Years	Club	Apps (scores)
2018-present	Ballyhale Shamrocks	50 (25-143)
Club titles
- Kilkenny titles: 5
- Leinster titles: 4
- All-Ireland Titles: 3
College
- Years: College
- 2020-2024: Institute of Technology, Carlow
College titles
- Fitzgibbon titles: 0
Inter-county**
Years	County	Apps (scores)
2020-present	Kilkenny	32 (13-76)
Inter-county titles
- Leinster titles: 6
- All-Irelands: 0
- NHL: 1
- All Stars: 1
- * club appearances and scores correct as of 21:19, 9 November 2025. **Inter County team apps and scores correct as of 20:58, 27 April 2026.

Eoin Cody (born 12 September 2000) is a hurler who plays for Kilkenny Senior Championship club Ballyhale Shamrocks and at inter-county level with the Kilkenny senior hurling team. He usually lines out as a corner-forward.

== Playing career ==
=== St. Kieran's College ===
Cody first came to hurling prominence as a student at St. Kieran's College in Kilkenny. After lining out in different grades throughout the years, he eventually joined the college's senior team. In his first big game at college's level, Cody scored eight points from placed balls in a 1–14 to 1–11 defeat by Dublin North in the 2018 Leinster final. He was dropped from the starting fifteen for the subsequent All-Ireland final against Presentation College, Athenry, but collected a winners' medal after coming on as a substitute in the 5–19 to 3-16 extra-time victory.

Cody was once again eligible for the college's senior team the following year and claimed a Leinster Colleges Championship title after a 1–17 to 2–07 defeat of Coláiste Eoin. The subsequent All-Ireland final was a repeat of the previous year, with Cody scoring eight points and collecting a second successive winners' medal after the 1–15 to 1–12 win over Presentation College, Athenry.

=== Ballyhale Shamrocks ===
After an underage career that yielded minor and under-20 championship successes, Cody joined the Ballyhale Shamrocks senior team for the 2018 Kilkenny County Championship. He made his debut on 23 September 2018, scoring a goal in the 3–22 to 1-12 first-round win over St. Patrick's. Cody ended the championship by claiming his first winners' medal after scoring 1-01 from play in the 2–20 to 2–17 defeat of Bennettsbridge in the final. He later claimed his first Leinster Club Championship medal after the 2–21 to 0–11 win over Ballyboden St. Enda's in the Leinster final. Cody was selected at left corner-forward when Ballyhale qualified for the All-Ireland final on 17 March 2019. He collected a first winners' medal following the 2–28 to 2–11 victory over St. Thomas's. Cody was one of six Ballyhale Shamrocks hurlers later chosen on the Team of the Year.

Cody won a second successive Kilkenny County Championship title after scoring 1-02 from play in the 2–21 to 1–15 win over James Stephens in the 2019 final. His undefeated championship run continued when he subsequently won a second successive Leinster CLub Championship medal after a 1–21 to 0–15 victory over St. Mullin's in the 2019 Leinster final. On 18 January 2020, Cody was again selected at left corner-forward when Ballyhale Shamrocks faced Borris-Ileigh in the 2020 All-Ireland final. He was held scoreless over the course of the game but claimed a second successive All-Ireland Club Championship medal after the 0–18 to 0–15 victory.

=== Kilkenny ===
Cody first played for Kilkenny as a 16-year-old when he was drafted onto the minor team for the 2017 Leinster Minor Championship. He claimed a Leinster Minor Championship title that season after coming on as a substitute in the 3–15 to 1–17 defeat of Dublin in the Leinster final. After being overage for the minor grade the following year, Cody was added to the Kilkenny under-20 team in 2019. He won a Leinster Under-20 Championship medal that season after scoring two points from play in the 1–17 to 0–18 win over Wexford in the final.

Performances at club level saw Cody drafted onto the Kilkenny senior team during the 2020 National League. He made his first appearance for the team when he came on as a substitute for Billy Ryan in a drawn round 4 game with Clare. Cody was later retained on Kilkenny's Leinster Championship panel, and claimed a provincial winners' medal after lining out at left corner-forward in the 2–20 to 0–24 victory over Galway in the 2020 final.

== Career statistics ==
=== Club ===
As of 8 November 2026.

Team	Year	Kilkenny		Leinster		All-Ireland		Total	
Team	Year	Apps	Score	Apps	Score	Apps	Score	Apps	Score
Ballyhale Shamrocks	2018-19	4	2-05	2	1-04	2	1-06	8	4-15
Ballyhale Shamrocks	2019-20	4	3-12	3	3-08	2	0-02	9	6-22
Ballyhale Shamrocks	2020-21	4	3-08	—		—		4	3-08
Ballyhale Shamrocks	2021-22	4	1-13	3	3-12	2	0-05	9	4-30
Ballyhale Shamrocks	2022-23	4	1-18	3	3-13	2	1-07	9	5-38
Ballyhale Shamrocks	2023-24	4	1-09	—		—		4	1-09
Ballyhale Shamrocks	2024-25	2	1-06	—		—		2	1-06
Ballyhale Shamrocks	2025-26	4	1-10	3	1-09	—		7	2-19
Ballyhale Shamrocks	2026-27	3	0-09	1	0-02	—		4	0-11
Total		33	13-100	15	11-48	8	2-20	56	26-158

=== Inter-county ===
As of 25 April 2026

Team	Year	National League			Leinster		All-Ireland		Total	
Team	Year	Division	Apps	Score	Apps	Score	Apps	Score	Apps	Score
Kilkenny	2020	Division 1A	2	1-09	2	0-02	1	0-02	5	1-13
Kilkenny	2021	Division 1B	4	1-17	2	1-06	1	0-04	7	2-27
Kilkenny	2022	Division 1B	2	0-06	6	2-10	2	0-04	10	2-20
Kilkenny	2023	Division 1B	5	2-09	6	3-16	2	2-05	13	7-30
Kilkenny	2024	Division 1A	7	3-23	4	2-05	1	1-00	12	6-28
Kilkenny	2025	Division 1A	4	1-22	2	2-18	1	0-02	7	3-42
Kilkenny	2026	Division 1A	6	2-21	2	0-02	0	0-00	8	2-23
Total			30	10-107	24	10-59	8	3-17	62	23-183

== Honours ==
St. Kieran's College

- All-Ireland Colleges Senior Hurling Championship: 2018, 2019
- Leinster Colleges Senior Hurling Championship: 2019

Ballyhale Shamrocks

- All-Ireland Senior Club Hurling Championship: 2019, 2020, 2023
- Leinster Senior Club Hurling Championship: 2018, 2019, 2021, 2022
- Kilkenny Senior Hurling Championship: 2018, 2019, 2020, 2021, 2022

Kilkenny

- Leinster Senior Hurling Championship: 2020, 2021, 2022, 2023 (c), 2024, 2025
- National Hurling League: 2021
- Leinster Under-20 Hurling Championship: 2019
- Leinster Minor Hurling Championship: 2017

Individual

- GAA GPA All Stars Awards: 2023

Sporting positions
Preceded by Richie Reid	Kilkenny senior hurling team captain 2023	Succeeded by Paddy Deegan
