= 2018 Croke Cup =

Irish hurling competition

- Dates: 10–31 March 2018
- Teams: 6
- Sponsor: Masita
- Champions: St Kieran's College (22nd title); Daithí Barron (captain); Tom Hogan (manager)
- Runners-up: Presentation College; Conor Walsh (captain); Mike Finn (manager)

Tournament statistics
- Matches played: 5
- Goals scored: 17 (3.4 per match)
- Points scored: 131 (26.2 per match)
- Top scorer(s): Conor Drennan (0-20)

The 2018 All-Ireland Post Primary Schools Croke Cup was the 67th staging of the Croke Cup since its establishment by the Gaelic Athletic Association in 1944. The competition ran from 10 to 31 March 2018.

Our Lady's Secondary School were the defending champions, however, they were beaten by Midleton CBS in the semi-final of the Harty Cup. Dublin North were the Leinster Championship winners, however, as an amalgamated team they were debarred from the provincial stage onwards. Their place in the All-Ireland series was taken by Kilkenny CBS, who qualified after beating Good Counsel College in a playoff.

The final was played on 31 March 2018 at Semple Stadium in Thurles, between St Kieran's College and Presentation College, Athenry, in what was their first ever meeting in the final. St Kieran's College won the match by 5–19 to 3–17 to claim their 22nd Croke Cup title overall and a first title in two years.

Conor Drennan was the top scorer with 0-20.

== Qualification ==
Province	Team 1	Team 2
Connacht	Presentation College	Gort Community School
Leinster	St Kieran's College	Kilkenny CBS
Munster	Ardscoil Rís	Midleton CBS

== Results ==
=== Quarter-finals ===
10 March 2018 Quarter-final	Kilkenny CBS	0-16 - 2-09	Midleton CBS	Clonmel Sportsground
	C Drennan (0-13, 0-10 frees); C Heary, S Boyd, L Hogan (0-1 each).	Report	L Gosnell (1-3, 0-2 frees); L O’Shea (1-1, frees); S O’Leary-Hayes (0-2); J Landers, G Millerick, K Farmer (0-1 each).

10 March 2018 Quarter-final	St Kieran's College	1-10 - 0-05	Gort Community School	Woodmount Grounds
	D O'Carroll 1-1, C Brennan 0-3, E Cody 0-3, A Mullen 0-1, E O'Shea 0-1, E Moylan 0-1.		E Egan 0-3, P Commins 0-2.	Referee: A Devine (Westmeath)

=== Semi-finals ===
19 March 2018 Semi-final	Presentation College, Athenry	4-10 - 2-12	Kilkenny CBS	Ferbane Grounds
	E Caulfield 2-0, M Kennedy 1-3 (0-2f), A Brett 1-0, C Walsh 0-3 (0-2f, 0-1 65), C Lawless 0-2, E O’Donnell 0-1, K Conneely 0-1.	Report	C Drennan 0-7 (0-3f), J Ryan 1-2, L Hogan 1-0, S Boyd 0-2, C Heary 0-1.	Referee: A Devine (Westmeath)

21 March 2018 Semi-final	St Kieran's College	0-19 - 0-14	Ardscoil Rís	Clonmel Sportsground
	A Mullen 0-6 (0-4f, 0-2 ’65), C Kelly 0-5 (0-3f), E O’Shea 0-3, D Barron, C Kelly (0-1f), D O’Carroll, C Brennan, E Cody (0-1 sideline cut).	Report	P O’Brien 0-7 (0-5f, 0-2 ‘65), D Ryan 0-3, R Considine 1-0, C O’Neill 0-2, A Moriarty, R Duff 0-1 each.	Referee: F Horgan (Tipperary)

=== Final ===
31 March 2018 Final	St Kieran's College	5-19 - 3-17 (aet)	Presentation College, Athenry	Semple Stadium
	C Brennan 2-1, A Mullen 0-7 (2F), C Kelly 0-7 (1F, 1 ‘65’), D Barron 1-2, D O’Carroll 1-0, J Young 1-0, E O’Shea 0-1, I Walsh 0-1	Report	M Kennedy 1-9 (6F, 2 ‘65’), A Brett 2-1, TJ Brennan 0-3, C Lawless 0-1, E Caulfield 0-1, C Walsh 0-1, McGlynn 0-1 (F)	Referee: F Horgan (Tipperary)

== Statistics ==
=== Top scorers ===
Overall

Rank	Player	County	Tally	Total	Matches	Average
1	Conor Drennan	Kilkenny CBS	0-20	20	2	10.00
2	Mark Kennedy	Presentation College	2-12	18	2	9.00
3	Adrian Mullen	St Kieran's College	0-14	14	3	4.66
4	Conor Kelly	St Kieran's College	0-12	12	2	6.00
5	Ciarán Brennan	St Kieran's College	2-05	11	3	3.66

Single game

Rank	Player	Club	Tally	Total	Opposition
1	Conor Drennan	Kilkenny CBS	0-13	13	Midleton CBS
2	Mark Kennedy	Presentation College	1-09	12	St Kieran's College
3	Ciarán Brennan	St Kieran's College	2-01	7	Presentation College
3	Adam Brett	Presentation College	2-01	7	St Kieran's College
3	Adrian Mullen	St Kieran's College	0-07	7	Presentation College
3	Conor Kelly	St Kieran's College	0-07	7	Presentation College
3	Conor Drennan	Kilkenny CBS	0-07	7	Presentation College
3	Paul O'Brien	Ardscoil Rís	0-07	7	St Kieran's College
9	Eoin Caulfield	Presentation College	2-01	7	Kilkenny CBS
9	Mark Kennedy	Presentation College	1-03	6	Kilkenny CBS
9	Liam Gosnell	Midleton CBS	1-03	6	Kilkenny CBS
9	Adrian Mullen	St Kieran's College	0-06	6	Ardscoil Rís
