= Adrian Mullen =

Irish hurler (born 1999)

Personal information
- Native name: Dreáin Ó Maoláin (Irish)
- Born: 30 March 1999 (age 27) Ballyhale, County Kilkenny, Ireland
- Occupation: Student
- Height: 6 ft 0 in (183 cm)

Sport
- Sport: Hurling
- Position: Right wing-forward
Club*
Years	Club	Apps (scores)
2017-present	Ballyhale Shamrocks	33 (10-78)
Club titles
- Kilkenny titles: 5
- Leinster titles: 4
- All-Ireland Titles: 2
College(s)
- Years: College
- University College Dublin; DCU Dóchas Éireann
College titles
- Fitzgibbon titles: 0
Inter-county**
Years	County	Apps (scores)
2019-present	Kilkenny	34 (5-73)
Inter-county titles
- Leinster titles: 3
- All-Irelands: 0
- NHL: 0
- All Stars: 1
- * club appearances and scores correct as of 16:36, 1 December 2019. **Inter County team apps and scores correct as of 18:40, 14 November 2025.

Adrian Mullen (born 30 March 1999) is an Irish hurler who plays for Kilkenny Senior Championship club Ballyhale Shamrocks and at inter-county level with the Kilkenny senior hurling team. He usually lines out as a right wing-forward.

== Playing career ==
=== St. Kieran's College ===
Mullen first came to prominence as a hurler with St. Kieran's College in Kilkenny. He played in every grade of hurling before eventually joining the college's senior hurling team. On 28 February 2015, he lined out in goal when St. Kieran's College defeated St Peter's College from Wexford by 1–14 to 1–06 to win the Leinster Championship. Mullen was again in goal when St. Kieran's College faced Thurles CBS in the All-Ireland final on 5 April 2015. He ended the game with a winners' medal following a 1–15 to 1–12 victory.

Mullen was switched from goal to the forwards for the 2016 Leinster Championship. He won a second successive Leinster Championship medal on 27 February 2016 after scoring 1–09 in the 2–12 to 1–11 defeat of Kilkenny CBS. On 28 March, Mullen won a second successive All-Ireland medal when he lined out at right wing-forward when St. Kieran's College defeated Ardscoil Rís from Limerick by 1–15 to 1–13.

Mullen was appointed captain of the team for the 2017 Leinster Championship. On 26 February, he won a third successive Leinster Championship medal after scoring ten points in a 1–14 to 0–13 defeat of Kilkenny CBS in the final. On 25 March, Mullen top scored with 2-02 when St. Kieran's College suffered a 3–13 to 3–11 defeat by Our Lady's Secondary School from Templemore in the All-Ireland final.

After deciding to repeat his Leaving Certificate, Mullen was again eligible for the team for a fourth successive year. On 22 February 2018, he scored 1-02 from left wing-forward when St. Kieran's College were defeated by 1–14 to 1–11 by Dublin North in the Leinster final. He was switched to midfield on 31 March 2018 when he became one of only a small group of players to play in four All-Ireland finals. Mullen scored seven points and collected a third winners' medal following the 5–19 to 3–16 defeat of Presentation College from Athenry.

=== Ballyhale Shamrocks ===
Mullen joined the Ballyhale Shamrocks club at a young age and played in all grades at juvenile and underage levels. He enjoyed championship success at minor level before later winning back-to-back championships with the under-21 team.

Mullen made his first senior championship appearance on 17 September 2017 in a first round game against Rower-Inistioge. He scored a point from play in the 2–16 to 0–12 victory.

On 28 October 2018, Mullen scored a point from right wing-forward when Ballyhale Shamrocks defeated Bennettsbridge by 2–20 to 2–17 to win the Kilkenny Championship. He lined out in the same position when Ballyhale faced Ballyboden St. Enda's in the Leinster final. Mullen scored 2-01 from play in the 2–21 to 0–11 victory. He was switched to the left wing-forward position for the All-Ireland final against St. Thomas's on 17 March 2019. Mullen scored five points from play and collected a winners' medal following the 2–28 to 2–11 victory. He ended the season by being named at right wing-forward on the Club Hurling Team of the Year while he was also named Club Hurler of the Year.

On 27 October 2019, Mullen lined out at right wing-forward when Ballyhale Shamrocks faced James Stephens in the Kilkenny Championship final. He scored three points from play and collected a second successive winners' medal after the 2–21 to 1–15 victory. On 1 December 2019, Mullen was again selected at right wing-forward when Ballyhale Shamrocks faced St. Mullin's in the Leinster final. He scored three points from play and collected a second successive provincial winners' medal following the 1–21 to 0–15 victory.

=== Kilkenny ===
==== Minor, under-21 and under-20 ====
Mullen first lined out for Kilkenny as a member of the minor team during the 2016 Leinster Championship. He made his first appearance on 14 May 2016 and scored eight points from right corner-forward in a 2–18 to 1–19 defeat by Dublin.

Mullen was eligible for the minor grade again the following year. On 2 July 2017, he top scored with 1-09 when Kilkenny defeated Dublin by 3–15 to 1–17 to win the Leinster Championship. Mullen ended the season by being included on the inaugural GAA Minor Star Awards Hurling Team of the Year.

On 20 June 2018, Mullen made his first appearance for the Kilkenny under-21 team. He scored two points from left wing-forward in a 1–17 to 3–13 defeat by Galway in the Leinster Championship.

On 24 June 2019, Mullen made his first appearance for Kilkenny's inaugural under-20 team. He scored two goals from left wing-forward in the 1–20 to 0–16 defeat of Laois. On 17 July 2019, Mullen won a Leinster Championship medal as an unused substitute when Kilkenny defeated Wexford by 1–17 to 0–18 in the final.

==== Senior ====
Mullen was drafted onto the Kilkenny senior team prior to the start of the 2019 Leinster Championship. He made his first appearance on 11 May 2019 when he lined out at right wing-forward in a 2–23 to 1–21 defeat of Dublin. On 30 June 2019, Mullen scored three points from left wing-forward when Kilkenny suffered a 1–23 to 0–23 defeat by Wexford in the Leinster final. Mullen was selected at right corner-forward for the All-Ireland final against Tipperary on 18 August 2019, however, his participation was in doubt after being hospitalised with an illness in the week leading up to the match. He was declared fit to play but was held scoreless in the 3–25 to 0–20 defeat. Mullen ended the season by being shortlisted for the Young Hurler of the Year award.

On 24 February 2020, it was confirmed that Mullen would miss the rest of the season having torn a knee cruciate ligament in Kilkenny's draw with Clare in Round 4 of the National League.

In 2021, Mullen was named as captain of the Kilkenny team for the 2021 hurling season.

== Career statistics ==
=== Club ===
As of 6 December 2025

Team	Year	Kilkenny		Leinster		All-Ireland		Total	
Team	Year	Apps	Score	Apps	Score	Apps	Score	Apps	Score
Ballyhale Shamrocks	2017-18	4	1-04	—		—		4	1-04
Ballyhale Shamrocks	2018-19	4	0-11	2	2-04	2	0-07	8	2-22
Ballyhale Shamrocks	2019-20	4	3-10	3	0-05	2	0-02	9	3-17
Ballyhale Shamrocks	2020-21	0	0-00	—		—		0	0-00
Ballyhale Shamrocks	2021-22	2	1-03	3	1-09	2	0-03	7	2-15
Ballyhale Shamrocks	2022-23	4	2-12	3	0-10	1	0-01	8	2-23
Ballyhale Shamrocks	2023-24	4	2-12	—		—		4	2-12
Ballyhale Shamrocks	2024-25	2	1-04	—		—		2	1-04
Ballyhale Shamrocks	2025-26	4	0-06	1	0-03	—		5	0-09
Total		28	10-62	12	3-31	7	0-13	47	13-106

=== Inter-County Underage ===
As of match played 17 July 2021.

Team	Year	National League			Leinster		All-Ireland		Total	
Team	Year	Division	Apps	Score	Apps	Score	Apps	Score	Apps	Score
Kilkenny Minor	2016	—			1	0-08	—		1	0-08
Kilkenny Minor	2017	—			4	3-38	1	0-04	5	3-42
Kilkenny Minor	Total	—			5	3-46	1	0-04	6	3-50
Kilkenny U21	2018	—			1	0-02	—		1	0-02
Kilkenny U21	Total	—			1	0-02	—		1	0-02
Kilkenny U20	2019	—			2	2-01	0	0-00	2	2-01
Kilkenny U20	Total	—			2	2-01	0	0-00	2	2-01
Kilkenny	2019	Division 1A	—		5	1-08	3	0-05	8	1-13
Kilkenny	2020	Division 1B	1	0-02	—		—		1	0-02
Kilkenny	2021	Division 1B	5	0-08	2	0-03	0	0-00	7	0-11
Kilkenny	Total		6	0-10	7	1-11	3	0-05	16	1-26

=== Senior Inter-County ===
As of match played 19 April 2025

Team	Year	National League			Leinster		All-Ireland		Total	
Team	Year	Division	Apps	Score	Apps	Score	Apps	Score	Apps	Score
Kilkenny	2019	Division 1A	—		5	1-08	3	0-05	8	1-13
Kilkenny	2020	Division 1B			—		—		—	
Kilkenny	2021	Division 1B			2	0-03	1	1-03	3	1-06
Kilkenny	2022	Division 1B			6	0-20	1	0-03	7	0-23
Kilkenny	2023	Division 1B			5	0-13	2	0-03	7	0-16
Kilkenny	2024	Division 1B			2	0-08	1	0-00	3	0-08
Kilkenny	2025	Division 1B			1	1-00			1	1-00
Total					21	2-52	8	1-14	29	3-66

== Honours ==
St. Kieran's College

- All-Ireland Colleges Senior Hurling Championship: 2015, 2016, 2018
- Leinster Colleges Senior Hurling Championship: 2015, 2016, 2017

Ballyhale Shamrocks

- All-Ireland Senior Club Hurling Championship: 2019, 2020
- Leinster Senior Club Hurling Championship: 2018, 2019, 2021, 2022
- Kilkenny Senior Hurling Championship: 2018, 2019, 2020, 2021, 2022

Kilkenny

- Leinster Senior Hurling Championship: 2021 (c), 2022
- Leinster Under-20 Hurling Championship: 2019
- Leinster Minor Hurling Championship: 2017

Awards

- All Stars Young Hurler of the Year (1): 2019
- All-Star Award (1): 2022

Sporting positions
Preceded by Colin Fennelly	Kilkenny Senior Hurling Captain; 2021	Succeeded by Richie Reid
Awards
Preceded by Seán Moran	GAA Club Hurler of the Year; 2019	Succeeded by Incumbent
