= Daniel Loftus =

Irish hurler

Personal information
- Native name: Dónall Ó Lachtnáin (Irish)
- Born: 1999 (age 26–27) Turloughmore, County Galway, Ireland
- Occupation: Student

Sport
- Sport: Hurling
- Position: Midfield
Club
- Years: Club
- Turloughmore
Club titles
- Galway titles: 0
College
- Years: College
- University of Galway
College titles
- Fitzgibbon titles: 0
Inter-county
- Years: County
- 2021-present: Galway
Inter-county titles
- Leinster titles: 0
- All-Irelands: 0
- NHL: 1
- All Stars: 0

Daniel Loftus (born 1999) is an Irish hurler. At club level, he plays with Turloughmore and at inter-county level with the Galway senior hurling team.

== Career ==
Loftus played hurling at all levels as a student at the Presentation College in Athenry. He later played with University of Galway in the Fitzgibbon Cup. At club level, Loftus plays with Turloughmore and was a Galway SHC runner-up in 2020 and 2023.

At inter-county level, Loftus first played for Galway as a member of the minor team. He was full-back when Galway beat Cokr by 2–17 to 2–15 to win the All-Ireland MHC title in 2017. He later progressed to the under-20 team. Loftus joined the senior team, alongside his brother Seán, In January 2021. He was part of the panel when Galway shared the National Hurling League title with Kilkenny in his debut season.

== Honours ==
Galway

- National Hurling League: 2021
- All-Ireland Minor Hurling Championship: 2017
