= Eoin Lawless =

Irish hurler

Personal information
- Born: 2002 (age 23–24) Athenry, County Galway, Ireland
- Occupation: Student

Sport
- Sport: Hurling
- Position: Full-back
Club
- Years: Club
- St Mary's, Athenry
Club titles
- Galway titles: 0
College
- Years: College
- University of Galway
College titles
- Fitzgibbon titles: 0
Inter-county
- Years: County
- 2023–: Galway
Inter-county titles
- Leinster titles: 0
- All-Irelands: 0
- NHL: 0
- All Stars: 0

Eoin Lawless (born 2002) is an Irish hurler. At club level he plays with St Mary's, Athenry, while he has also lined out at inter-county level with various Galway teams.

== Career ==
Lawless first played hurling to a high standard as a student at Presentation College, Athenry. He was part of the Pres team that won consecutive Connacht Colleges SAHC titles in 2018 and 2019 but lost the subsequent All-Ireland finals to St Kieran's College. Lawless later lined out with the University of Galway team that lost back-to-back Fitzgibbon Cup finals in 2022 and 2023.

At club level, Lawless first played hurling at juvenile and underage levels with the St Mary's club in Athenry. He was part of the club's under-21 team that claimed the Galway U21AHC title in 2019. Lawless has since joined the St Mary's senior team.

Lawless first appeared at inter-county level with Galway as a member of the minor team that won back-to-back All-Ireland MHC titles in 2018 and 2019. The latter season saw him being named on the Minor Team of the Year. Lawless immediately progressed onto the under-20 team and was at right wing-forward late addition on the team beaten by Cork in the 2021 All-Ireland under-20 final. He made his senior team debut in 2023.

== Honours ==
Presentation College Athenry

- Connacht Colleges Senior A Hurling Championship: 2018, 2019

St Mary's, Athenry

- Galway Under-21 A Hurling Championship: 2019

Galway

- Leinster Under-20 Hurling Championship: 2021
- All-Ireland Minor Hurling Championship: 2018, 2019
