= Colum Prendiville =

Irish hurler (born 1998)

Personal information
- Born: 19 May 1998 (age 28) Ballycallan, County Kilkenny, Ireland
- Occupation: Software developer
- Height: 6 ft 3 in (191 cm)

Sport
- Sport: Hurling
- Position: Midfield
Club
- Years: Club
- Graigue-Ballycallan
Club titles
- Kilkenny titles: 0
College
- Years: College
- 2017-2021: DCU Dóchas Éireann
College titles
- Fitzgibbon titles: 0
Inter-county
- Years: County
- 2022: Kilkenny
Inter-county titles
- Leinster titles: 1
- All-Irelands: 0
- NHL: 0
- All Stars: 0

Colum Prendiville (born 19 May 1998) is an Irish hurler. At club level he plays with Graigue-Ballycallan, while he has also lined out at inter-county level with various Kilkenny teams.

== Career ==
Prendiville first played hurling at juvenile and underage levels with the Graigue-Ballycallan club. As a schoolboy, he won a Croke Cup medal with St Kieran's College in 2016, while he later lined out with Dublin City University in the Fitzgibbon Cup. After progressing to adult club level, Prendiville was a panel member when Graigue-Ballycallan beat Portlaoise to win the Leinster Club IHC title in 2018.

Prendiville first played for Kilkenny at inter-county level at minor level in 2016. He was later included on the under-21 team. Prendiville later progressed to the intermediate team and won an All-Ireland IHC medal after a defeat of Cork in 2017. After a number of years out of the inter-county scene, he was drafted onto the senior team in 2022 and won a Leinster SHC medals as a panel member.

== Honours ==
St Kieran's College

- All-Ireland PPS Croke Cup: 2016
- Leinster PPS Senior Hurling Championship: 2016

Graigue-Ballycallan

- Leinster Intermediate Club Hurling Championship: 2018
- Kilkenny Intermediate Hurling Championship: 2018

Kilkenny

- Leinster Senior Hurling Championship: 2022
- All-Ireland Intermediate Hurling Championship: 2017
- Leinster Intermediate Hurling Championship: 2017
