= Seán Loftus =

Seán Loftus may refer to:

- Seán Dublin Bay Rockall Loftus (1927–2010), Irish environmentalist, barrister and politician
- Seán Loftus (hurler), Irish hurler
