= James Maher (hurler) =

Irish hurler (born 1995)

Personal information
- Native name: Séamus Ó Meachair (Irish)
- Born: 14 July 1995 (age 31) Freshford, County Kilkenny, Ireland
- Occupation: Operations manager
- Height: 6 ft 1 in (185 cm)

Sport
- Sport: Hurling
- Position: Midfield
Club
- Years: Club
- St Lachtain's
Club titles
- Limerick titles: 0
College
- Years: College
- 2014-2018: University College Dublin
College titles
- Fitzgibbon titles: 0
Inter-county*
Years	County	Apps (scores)
2016–present	Kilkenny	10 (0-10)
Inter-county titles
- Leinster titles: 0
- All-Irelands: 0
- NHL: 1
- All Stars: 0
- *Inter County team apps and scores correct as of 11:44, 14 December 2019.

James Maher (born 14 July 1995) is an Irish hurler who plays for Kilkenny Intermediate Championship club St Lachtain's and at inter-county level with the Kilkenny senior hurling team. He usually lines out as a midfielder.

== Playing career ==
=== St Kieran's College ===
Maher first came to prominence as a hurler with St Kieran's College and played in every grade of hurling before eventually joining the college's senior hurling team. On 3 March 2012, he was introduced as a substitute when St Kieran's College defeated local rivals Kilkenny CBS by 2–09 to 1–10 to win the Leinster Championship.

On 3 March 2013, Maher lined out at centre-back when St. Kieran's College faced Kilkenny CBS in a second successive Leinster final. He ended the game on the losing side following a 2–09 to 1–07 defeat.

Maher was appointed captain of the St Kieran's College senior team for the 2013–14 season. On 9 March 2014, he lined out at centre-back when St Kieran's College suffered a 2–13 to 0–13 defeat by Kilkenny CBS in the Leinster final. Maher was switched to midfield when he captained the team to an All-Ireland final meeting with Kilkenny CBS on 5 April 2014. He ended the game with a winners' medal following a 2–16 to 0–13 victory.

=== University College Dublin ===
As a student at University College Dublin, Maher joined the senior hurling team during his second year at the university. He was a regular player for the senior hurling team during several Fitzgibbon Cup campaigns.

=== St Lachtain's ===
Maher joined the St Lachtain's club at a young age and played in all grades at juvenile and underage levels. He enjoyed championship success in the under-21 grade before eventually joining the club's top adult team in the Kilkenny Intermediate Championship.

=== Kilkenny ===
==== Minor and under-21 ====
Maher first played for Kilkenny as a member of the minor team during the 2011 Leinster Championship. On 3 July 2011, he scored 1-01 from play after coming on as 38th-minute substitute for Conor Martin in Kilkenny's 1–14 to 1–11 defeat by Dublin in the Leinster final.

Maher was again eligible for the minor grade for a third and final season in 2013. On 7 July 2013, he won a Leinster Championship medal after lining out at right wing-back in Kilkenny's 1–18 to 0–08 defeat of Laois in the final.

On 2 June 2015, Maher made his first appearance for the Kilkenny under-21 team when he scored 1-01 from play in a 4–12 to 2–16 defeat of Dublin. On 8 July 2015, he was introduced as a substitute after starting the game on the bench in Kilkenny's 4–17 to 1–09 defeat by Wexford in the Leinster final.

==== Intermediate ====
Maher was just 17-years-old when he was added to the Kilkenny intermediate team for the 2012 Leinster Championship. He was an unused substitute on 28 June 2012 but collected a Leinster Championship medal in a 3–20 to 2–14 defeat of Wexford in the final. Maher was again named on the substitutes' bench for the All-Ireland final against Tipperary on 1 September 2012, however, he ended on the losing side following a 3–13 to 1–17 defeat.

==== Senior ====
Maher was added to the Kilkenny senior team in advance of the 2016 National League. He made his first appearance for the team on 14 February 2016 when he was introduced as a 48th-minute substitute for Mark Kelly at left corner-forward in a 0–14 to 0–10 defeat by Waterford. On 3 July 2016, Maher won a Leinster Championship medal as a member of the extended panel following Kilkenny's 1–26 to 0–22 defeat of Galway in the final. He was again a member of the extended panel when Kilkennyb suffered a 2–29 to 2–20 defeat by Tipperary in the All-Ireland final on 4 September 2016.

On 8 April 2018, Maher lined out at midfield when Kilkenny defeated Tipperary by 2–23 to 2–17 to win the National League title. He was again selected at midfield when Kilkenny faced Galway in the Leinster final on 1 July 2018. Maher scored a point from play in the 0-18 apiece draw. He retained his position for the replay a week later, however, Kilkenny suffered a 1–28 to 3–15 defeat.

Maher was selected at midfield on 30 June 2019 when Kilkenny faced Wexford in the Leinster final. He scored a point from play but ended the game on the losing side following a 1–23 to 0–23 defeat. On 18 August 2019, Maher was listed amongst the substitutes when Kilkenny faced Tipperary in the All-Ireland final. He remained on the bench for the 3–25 to 0–20 defeat.

== Personal life ==
Maher was born in Freshford, County Kilkenny. His mother, Jillian Dillon-Maher, played camogie with the Kilkenny senior team and won All-Ireland medals in 1990, 1991 and 1994. Maher's grandfather, Pa Dillon, won three All-Ireland medals with the Kilkenny senior hurling team between 1967 and 1972.

== Career statistics ==
As of match played 18 August 2019.

Team	Year	National League			Leinster		All-Ireland		Total	
Team	Year	Division	Apps	Score	Apps	Score	Apps	Score	Apps	Score
Kilkenny	2016	Division 1A	5	0-06	0	0-00	0	0-00	5	0-06
Kilkenny	2017	Division 1A	3	0-00	0	0-00	0	0-00	3	0-00
Kilkenny	2018	Division 1A	8	0-07	5	0-05	1	0-03	14	0-15
Kilkenny	2019	Division 1A	6	0-04	2	0-01	2	0-01	10	0-06
Total			22	0-17	7	0-06	3	0-04	32	0-27

== Honours ==
St Kieran's College

- All-Ireland Colleges Senior Hurling Championship (1): 2014 (c)
- Leinster Colleges Senior Hurling Championship (1): 2012

St Lachtain's

- Kilkenny Under-21 Hurling Championship (1): 2012

Kilkenny

- Leinster Senior Hurling Championship (1): 2016
- National Hurling League (1): 2018
- Leinster Intermediate Hurling Championship (1): 2012
- Leinster Minor Hurling Championship (1): 2013
