= Jeff Neary =

Irish hurler

Personal information
- Native name: Séafra Ó Náraigh (Irish)
- Born: 2005 (age 20–21) Ballycallan, County Kilkenny, Ireland
- Occupation: Student
- Height: 6 ft 11 in (211 cm)

Sport
- Sport: Hurling
- Position: Right corner-back
Club
- Years: Club
- 2023-present: Graigue–Ballycallan
Club titles
- Kilkenny titles: 0
Inter-county
- Years: County
- 2025-: Kilkenny
Inter-county titles
- Leinster titles: 0
- All-Irelands: 0
- NHL: 0
- All Stars: 0

Jeff Neary (born 2005) is an Irish hurler. At club level he plays with Graigue–Ballycallan and at inter-county level with the Kilkenny senior hurling team.

== Career ==
Neary played hurling at all levels during his schooldays at St Kieran's College in Kilkenny. He spent two years with the college's senior team and won a Dr Croke Cup title in 2023, before captaining the team to a second successive title in 2024. Neary plays his club hurling with Graigue–Ballycallan.

At inter-county level, Neary spent two years with Kilkenny's minor team. He won a Leinster MHC medal in 2021 after a 1–15 to 2–10 defeat of Wexford in the final. Neary immediately progressed to the under-20 team.

Neary was listed amongst the substitutes for Kilkenny's game against Wexford in the National Hurling League in February 2025.

== Honours ==
St Kieran's College

- Dr Croke Cup: 2023, 2024 (c)
- Leinster Colleges Senior Hurling Championship: 2023, 2024

Kilkenny

- Leinster Minor Hurling Championship: 2021
