= William Maher (hurler) =

Irish hurler, coach, and manager

Personal information
- Native name: Liam Ó Meachair (Irish)
- Born: 6 March 1979 (age 47) Ballingarry, County Tipperary, Ireland
- Occupation: Account manager
- Height: 6 ft 2 in (188 cm)

Sport
- Sport: Hurling
- Position: Midfield
Club
- Years: Club
- 1996-2002: Ballingarry
Club titles
- Tipperary titles: 0
College
- Years: College
- 1997-2001: Waterford Institute of Technology
College titles
- Fitzgibbon titles: 2
Inter-county
- Years: County
- 1998-1999: Tipperary
Inter-county titles
- Munster titles: 0
- All-Irelands: 0
- NHL: 1
- All Stars: 0

William Maher (born 6 March 1979) is an Irish hurling coach selector and former player. At club level, he played with Ballingarry and at inter-county level played for Tipperary at all levels. Maher has also been involved as a coach and team manager at club and county levels in Tipperary, Waterford, Dublin, Laois and Kilkenny. He was appointed as the GAA's National Head of Hurling in January 2025.

== Playing career ==
Maher first played hurling to a high standard as a student at St Kieran's College in Kilkenny. He won several provincial titles in all grades, before claiming a Dr Croke Cup title following a 1–14 to 2–06 win over St Colman's College in the 1996 All-Ireland final. Maher later attended Waterford Institute of Technology and won consecutive Fitzgibbon Cup medals in 1999 and 2000.

At club level, Maher first played with the Ballingarry Gaels juvenile club. He won consecutive Tipperary MAHC titles in 1995 and 1996, before later claiming consecutive divisional U21AHC titles in 1997 and 1998. By that stage, he had also started playing at adult level as a dual player with Ballingarry. Maher won three South Tipperary SHC medals between 1996 and 2001. He also had a Gaelic football success in 1996, when the club won the South Tipperary JAFC title.

Maher first appeared on the inter-county scene with Tipperary at minor level. He won consecutive Munster MHC medals, as well as captaining the team to the All-Ireland MHC title in 1996. His subsequent three seasons with the under-21 team ended without success. Maher joined the senior team during the pre-season South-East League in 1998 and was a panel member when Tipperary won the National Hurling League title in 1999. A freak accident in a training match in February 2001 effectively ended his career.

== Coaching career ==
Maher's coaching career began at club level with Ballingarry. He was also part of Shay Boland's Dublin minor hurling management team in 2008. Maher's next inter-county position was as a selector with the Tipperary under-21 team. His two-year tenure saw the team claim the All-Ireland U21HC title in 2010 after a 5-22 to 0-12 defeat of Galway in the final.

Maher was appointed as Tipperary minor hurling team manager in October 2011. His first season in charge saw the team win the All-Ireland MHC title following a 2-18 to 1-11 win over Dublin in the final. Maher became assistant manager of the Waterford senior hurling team in October 2013, but left the position after one season. He served two seasons as manager of the Tipperary under-21 team, with one season also in charge of the intermediate team, but stepped down in July 2017.

After being passed over for the Tipperary senior hurling team manager's position, Maher returned to club hurling and took charge of Cuala in November 2018, having earlier served as Ireland's joint-manager for the annual Shinty–Hurling International Series. He guided Cuala to consecutive Dublin SHC title in 2019 and 2020. Maher later had a season as a selector Bennettsbridge before being appointed Laois senior hurling team manager in September 2022. His second season saw him guide the team to the Division 2A title, before losing the Joe McDonagh Cup final to Offaly.

== Honours ==
=== Player ===
St Kieran's College

- All-Ireland Colleges Senior Hurling Championship: 1996
- Leinster Colleges Senior Hurling Championship: 1996
- Leinster Colleges Junior Hurling Championship: 1994, 1995

Waterford Institute of Technology

- Fitzgibbon Cup: 1999, 2000

Ballingarry

- South Tipperary Senior Hurling Championship: 1996, 1998, 2001
- South Tipperary Junior Football Championship: 1996
- South Tipperary Under-21 A Hurling Championship: 1997, 1998
- Tipperary Minor A Hurling Championship: 1995, 1996

Tipperary

- National Hurling League: 1999
- All-Ireland Minor Hurling Championship: 1996 (c)
- Munster Minor Hurling Championship: 1996 (c), 1997

=== Management ===
Cuala

- Dublin Senior Hurling Championship: 2019, 2020

Tipperary

- All-Ireland Under-21 Hurling Championship: 2010
- Munster Under-21 Hurling Championship: 2010
- All-Ireland Minor Hurling Championship: 2012
- Munster Minor Hurling Championship: 2012

Laois

- National Hurling League Division 2A: 2024

Achievements
Preceded by Brian O'Keeffe	All-Ireland Minor Hurling Final winning captain 1996	Succeeded by John Reddan
Preceded by Mattie Murphy	All-Ireland Minor Hurling Final winning manager 2012	Succeeded by Seán Power
Sporting positions
Preceded by Liam Cahill	Tipperary minor hurling team captain 1996	Succeeded by Donnacha Fahy
Preceded by Raymie Ryan	Tipperary minor hurling team manager 2012-2013	Succeeded by Liam Cahill
Preceded by T. J. Connolly	Tipperary under-21 hurling team manager 2015-2017	Succeeded by Liam Cahill
Preceded by Séamus Plunkett	Laois senior hurling team manager 2022-2024	Succeeded by Darren Gleeson
