= Ed McDermott =

Irish hurler

Personal information
- Native name: Éamonn Mac Diarmada (Irish)
- Nickname: Big Ed
- Born: 2006 (age 19–20) Kilkenny, Ireland
- Occupation: Student

Sport
- Sport: Hurling
- Position: Right corner-forward
Club
- Years: Club
- 2024-present: James Stephens
Club titles
- Kilkenny titles: 0
College
- Years: College
- 2024-present: University College Cork
College titles
- Fitzgibbon titles: 0
Inter-county*
Years	County	Apps (scores)
2026-	Kilkenny	0 (0-00)
Inter-county titles
- Leinster titles: 0
- All-Irelands: 0
- NHL: 0
- All Stars: 0
- *Inter County team apps and scores correct as of 17:59, 23 April 2024.

Edward McDermott (born 2006) is an Irish hurler. At club level he plays with James Stephens and at inter-county level with the Kilkenny senior hurling team.

== Career ==
McDermott attended St Kieran's College and played in all grades of hurling during his time there. He was part of the back-to-back Dr Croke Cup-winning teams in 2023 and 2024, while he also won a Leinster PPS SAHC title. McDermott later lined out with University College Cork in the Fitzgibbon Cup.

At club level, McDermott first played for James Stephens at juvenile and underage levels. He won consecutive Kilkenny MAHC titles in 2023 and 2024, before progressing to adult level. McDermott's first year with the seniors saw the team relegated to the Kilkenny IHC.

McDermott first appeared on the inter-county scene for Kilkenny during a two-year tenure with the minor team in 2022 and 2023. He immediately progressed to the under-20 team and lined out with them in the 3–19 to 1–16 defeat by Tipperary in the 2025 All-Ireland U20HC final. McDermott made his senior team debut in a National Hurling League game against Cork in March 2026.

== Honours ==
St Kieran's College

- All-Ireland PPS Senior A Hurling Championship (2): 2023, 2024
- Leinster PPS Senior A Hurling Championship (1): 2024

James Stephens

- Kilkenny Minor A Hurling Championship (2): 2023, 2024

Kilkenny

- Leinster Under-20 Hurling Championship: 2025
