= Timeline of the Lyndon B. Johnson presidency (1964) =

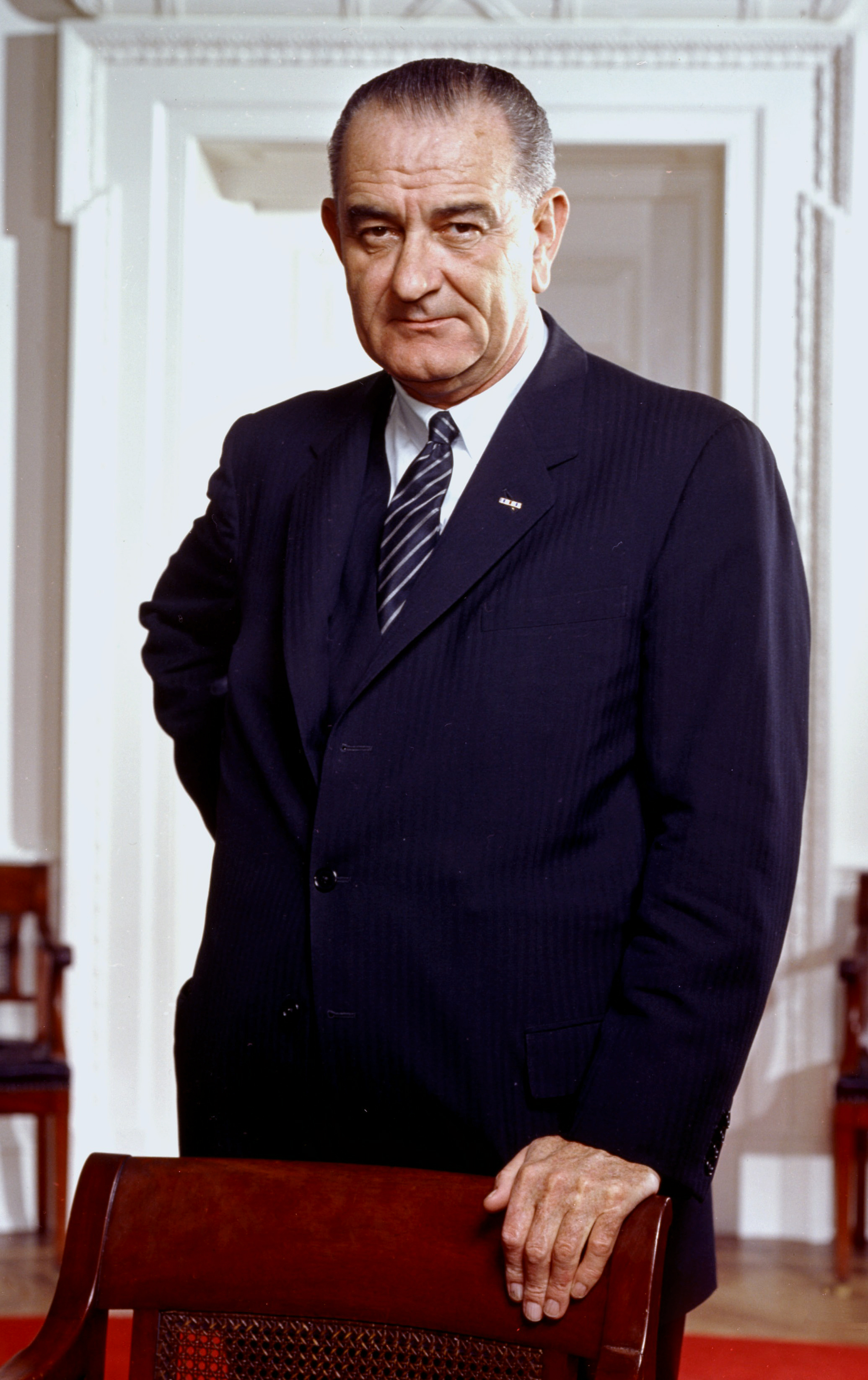
Johnson in 1964

The following is a timeline of the presidency of Lyndon B. Johnson from January 1, 1964, to December 31, 1964.

== January ==
- January 1 – Informants of the White House say the year end appraisal of the plans and policies of President Johnson caused the latter to worry over the stand off between Russia and the western world. They were close to with a closeness to reaching an ultimatum involving nuclear precipice.
- January 2 – President Johnson holds a budget conference with United States Postmaster General John Gronouski. Gronouski says after the meeting that the plan designed to save money for the upcoming fiscal year of 1965 will not cut back on the utilities of the mailing service. The US receives a note from the Soviet Union calling for the denunciation of force in disputes of territory ownership. President Johnson releases a statement on labor-management relations.
- January 3 – President Johnson releases a statement on the assassination attempt of President of Ghana Kwame Nkrumah. President Johnson signs Executive Order 11136, creating the President's Committee on Consumer Interests as well as establishing the Consumer Advisory Council. President Johnson announces the establishment of the President's Committee on Consumer Interests and appointment of Esther Peterson as chairman of the committee.
- January 5 – President Johnson releases the Task Force on Manpower Conservation report.
- January 6 – United States Secretary of Labor W. Willard Wirtz announces the federal government will step in to mediate the railroad work rules dispute.

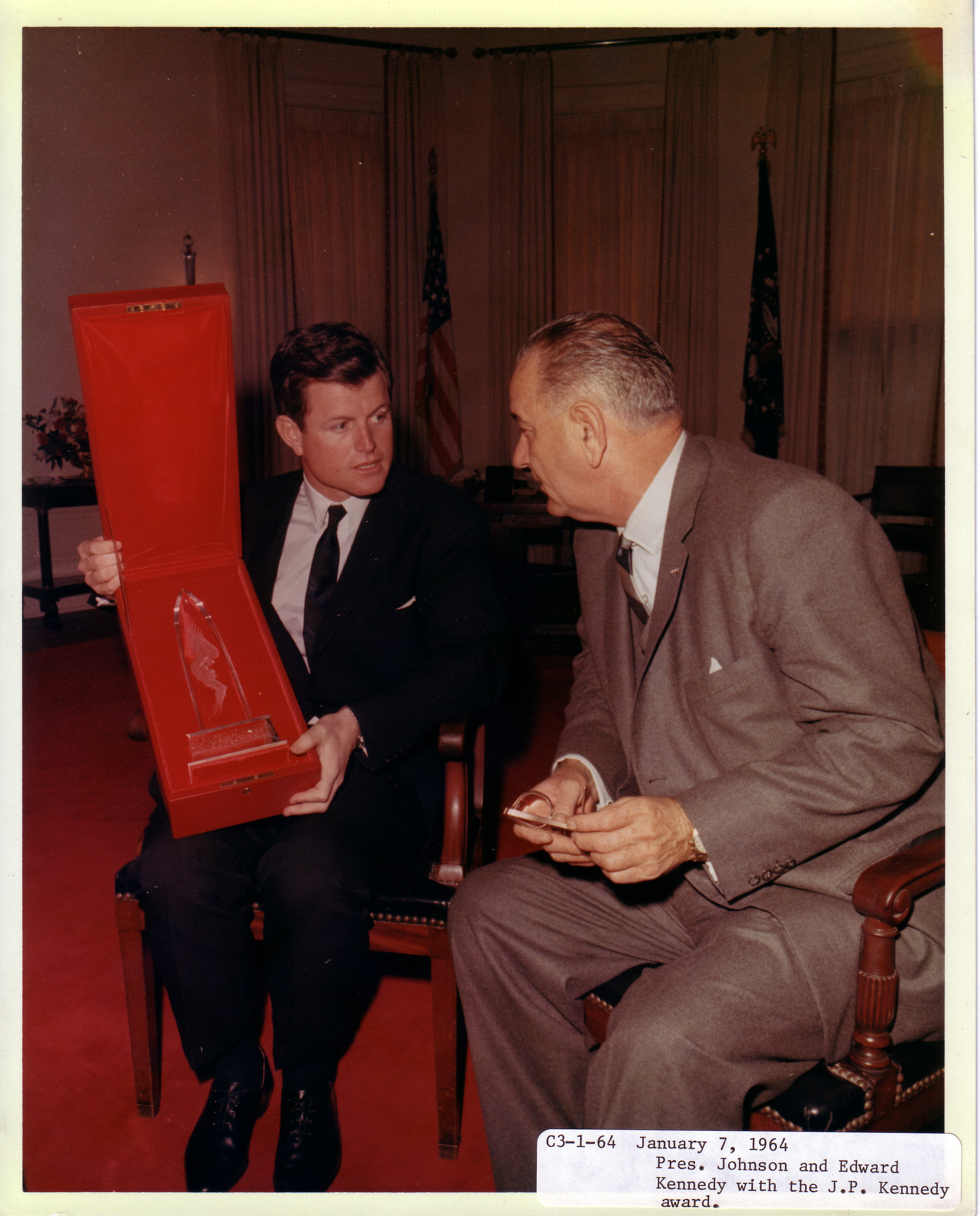
Senator Ted Kennedy presents Joseph P. Kennedy Award to President Johnson, 7 January 1964

- January 8 – President Johnson delivers the 1964 State of the Union Address to a joint session of Congress. These remarks serve as the announcement of the legislation that will become known as the War on Poverty.
- January 9 – President Johnson holds a Cabinet Room meeting with the executive committee of the Business Committee for Tax Reduction during the afternoon and meets with the Citizens Committee for Tax Reduction and Revision in the Fish Room hours later for discussions on tax reduction.
- January 10 – The White House releases a statement confirming a meeting between President Johnson and his senior advisors over the Panama situation had taken place.
- January 15 – President Johnson addresses members of the Davis Cup Team in the Cabinet Room during the morning.
- January 16 – The White House releases a statement confirming the willingness of the American government to become involved in holding conversations on "all problems affecting the relationship between the United States and Panama."
- January 17 – President Johnson releases a statement on the report by the Immigration and Naturalization Service advocating for the passage of proposed legislation intending to abolish the discriminatory national origins system.
- January 18 – President Johnson attends the dedication of the National Geographic Society Building in D.C. during the afternoon.
- January 20 – President Johnson signs the 1965 budget in the Cabinet Room during a ceremony attended by members of the Budget Bureau Staff. Reverend Jorge Mejia reads a message from President Johnson while attending the evening session of the First Conference of the Catholic Inter-American Cooperation Program.
- January 21 – President Johnson addresses the Geneva Disarmament Conference reopening in the Cabinet Room during the morning. President Johnson sends the budget of the District of Columbia in an annual message to Congress.
- January 23 – The 24th Amendment to the United States Constitution

== February ==
- February 1 – President Johnson holds his fifth news conference in the Theater at the White House, beginning the conference with an address on the efforts of the United States "to insure both peace and freedom in the widest possible areas" and answers questions from reporters on if he could see a scenario where he would endorse the admission of Red China into the United Nations, whether General de Gaulle's proposal for neutralizing Southeast Asia interferes with American efforts there, if he shares the optimism of Canada Prime Minister Pearson, his anticipation of a filibuster for the civil rights bill, if he would back the inclusion of an amendment to add women in the civil rights bill, his opinions on the activities of Walter Jenkins, on if his opinion on North and South Vietnam differs from President de Gaulle, and what general area he believes the war on poverty program should focus on.
- February 4 – Administrator of General Services Bernard L. Boutin certifies the twenty-fourth Amendment to the United States Constitution during a morning appearance in the Cabinet Room.
- February 5 – President Johnson attends the Joseph P. Kennedy Jr. Foundation Awards Dinner at the Americana Hotel in New York City.
- February 5 – President Johnson submits a special message on consumer interest to Congress.
- February 5 – President Johnson attends the 12th Annual Presidential Prayer Breakfast at the Mayflower Hotel in Washington.
- February 6 – President Johnson attends a dinner for the Weizmann Institute of Science in the Grand Ballroom at the Waldorf-Astoria Hotel in New York City.
- February 7 – In a statement, President Johnson expresses his satisfaction with congressional approval for the tax bill, extending his "gratitude to the House which passed the tax bill last session, and to the Senate whose members worked hard to assure swift but full consideration of it in the last few weeks."
- February 7 – The Beatles arrive in New York City for their first U.S. tour.
- February 7 – The White House releases a statement declaring American determination to secure the protection for the Naval Base at Guantanamo.
- February 7 – President Johnson signs Proclamation 3573, proclaiming the week beginning with March 15, 1964 as "National Poison Prevention Week."
- February 9 – In a statement, President Johnson states that the issues "millions of older Americans face" and promotes "the enactment of hospital insurance for the aged through social security to help older people meet the high costs of illness without jeopardizing their economic independence" and urges each state "to adopt adequate programs of medical assistance for the aged under the Kerr-Mills legislation."
- February 10 – In a statement, President Johnson notes the advancing of the Communications Satellite Act and the United States' national program "moves forward aggressively toward the fulfillment of the policy and purposes of the Congress."
- February 10 – In a special message to Congress, President Johnson notes various ailments afflicting the health of Americans and lays out the year's agenda for America's good health.
- February 11 – President Johnson signs a bill amending the Library Services Act in the Cabinet Room. President Johnson says the legislation "expands a program which helps make library services available to 38 million Americans in rural areas" and "authorizes efforts to strengthen inadequate urban libraries. This act authorizes for the first time grants for the construction and renovation of library buildings."
- February 11 – President Johnson addresses key officials of the Internal Revenue Service on the importance of the Treasury and Defense Departments as well as matters of foreign policy in the East Room.
- February 12 – In a letter to Sargent Shriver, President Johnson states his directing of "all departmental and agency heads and their personnel to dedicate themselves to this great task, and to exert their maximum energies and resources to assist our fellow citizens who are ill-clad, ill-fed, ill-housed or to whom the door of self-improvement and opportunity is closed."

== March ==
- March 1 – In recorded remarks, President Johnson discusses the benefits of Red Cross and calls on Americans to show support in any way they can to Red Cross during the month.
- March 2 – Nicholas Johnson is sworn in as Maritime Administrator in the Cabinet Room.
- March 2 – President Johnson signs Proclamation 3576, proclaiming "Tuesday, April 14, 1964, as Pan American Day and the week beginning April 12 and ending April 18 as Pan American Week" and calling "upon the Governors of the fifty States of the Union, the Governor of the Commonwealth of Puerto Rico, and appropriate officials of all other areas under the United States flag to issue similar proclamations."
- March 2 – President Johnson signs Executive Order 11143, establishing a "Public Advisory Committee for Trade Negotiations" that will "advise the Special Representative for Trade Negotiations with respect to such matters as he may specify pertaining to the preparation for and the participation in international trade negotiations."
- March 3 – President Johnson delivers remarks to winners of the Federal Woman's Award in the Fish Room.
- March 3 – In a statement, the White House announces that President Johnson has revealed minority employees have had increased job opportunities according to a federal employment study from June 1963 showing "impressive gains in the number of higher paid jobs filled by Negroes and other minorities."
- March 4 – President Johnson presents the first Eleanor Roosevelt Memorial Award to judge Anna M. Kross at the Statler Hilton Hotel in Washington.
- March 4 – In a statement, President Johnson says the resolution adopted by the "Security Council in agreement with all parties to the crisis in Cyprus is a major step toward peace" and that the resolution's adoption means the Security Council open "the way to the creation of a United Nations peacekeeping force and the appointment of an international mediator."
- March 4 – Frederick C. Belen and William McMillan are sworn in as Deputy Postmaster General and Assistant Postmaster General in the Cabinet Room.
- March 5 – President Johnson signs Executive Order 11144, creating the Temporary Alaska Claims Commission and its intent to "consider, ascertain, adjust, determine, and settle the dispute which has arisen between the United States and the State of Alaska concerning the transfer, conveyance, or other disposal to the State of Alaska of the said property."
- March 6 – In a statement, President Johnson says the recently deceased Paul of Greece had "steadfast devotion and unwavering faith in Greece and the Greek people provided leadership in times of strife, unrest, readjustment, and recovery."
- March 16 – In a special message to Congress, President Johnson submits the Economic Opportunity Act of 1964. Johnson promotes the legislation as giving the five basic opportunities of granting "almost half a million underprivileged young Americans the opportunity to develop skills, continue education, and find useful work", giving "every American community the opportunity to develop a comprehensive plan to fight its own poverty--and help them to carry out their plans", permitting "dedicated Americans the opportunity to enlist as volunteers in the war against poverty", allotting "many workers and farmers the opportunity to break through particular barriers which bar their escape from poverty", and giving "the entire nation the opportunity for a concerted attack on poverty through the establishment, under my direction, of the Office of Economic Opportunity, a national headquarters for the war against poverty."
- March 16 – President Johnson delivers remarks on the third anniversary of the Alliance for Progress at the Pan American Union.
- March 16 – President Johnson delivers remarks to the Labor Advisory Council to the President's Committee on Equal Employment Opportunity in the Fish Room.
- March 17 – President Johnson delivers remarks at a dinner for the Friendly Sons of St. Patrick in the Grand Ballroom at the Waldorf-Astoria Hotel in New York City.
- March 17 – In a statement, the White House reports that Defense Secretary Robert McNamara and General Taylor gave a report to President Johnson and National Security Council members regarding "the situation in South Viet-Nam, the measures being taken by General Khanh and his government, and the need for United States assistance to supplement and support these measures" as well as "the continuing support and direction of the Viet Cong insurgency from North Viet-Nam."
- March 17 – In a letter to Speaker of the House John W. McCormack, President Johnson urges "the House to reconsider and approve legislation to increase pay levels of Government employees", adding that 2 million federal workers would continue to be deprived "of fair and reasonable pay adjustments", difficulty in the recruiting and retention of "top-flight men and women", and his administration's efforts to attain a "true economy in government" would all be made unattainable if the legislation was not enacted.
- March 17 – President Johnson signs Executive Order 11147, creating a board to investigate the dispute between the "National Railway Labor Conference, designated in List A attached hereto and made a part hereof, and certain of their employees".
- March 18 – In a letter to United States Secretary of the Treasury Douglas Dillon, President Johnson expresses his concern with "reports of a lack of coordination of action and procedures among the Federal agencies charged with the responsibility for the regulation of banks" and directs Douglas "to establish procedures which will insure that every effort is made by these agencies to act in concert and compose their differences."
- March 18 – President Johnson holds a telephone conversation with President of the National Farmers' Union James O. Patton on the National Farmers' Union convention from his White House office.
- March 19 – In a special message to Congress, President Johnson mentions other countries needing assistance and that the United States, through its aid for other regions, will be providing "an incentive to our friends and allies." Johnson recommends "335 Million for Supporting Assistance, $225 Million for Technical Cooperation, $134 Million for Contributions to International Organizations, $150 Million for the President's Contingency Fund, and $73 Million for Administrative and Miscellaneous Expenses."
- March 19 – In a letter to House Speaker McCormick and Senate President pro tempore Carl Hayden, President Johnson submits "copies of two publications of the Federal Council for Science and Technology that set forth Government-wide plans and budget details."
- March 19 – President Johnson attends the 1964 Democratic Congressional Dinner at the National Guard Armory in Washington, D.C., delivering remarks on the "basic purpose" of the Democratic Party as outlined by former president Franklin D. Roosevelt during the first Democratic Congressional Dinner in 1936.
- March 20 – President Johnson signs what he calls "the largest separate fund authorization ever enacted by the Congress" in the Cabinet Room and in tribute to Carl Vinson, notes that it "marks one of the final official acts of patriotism from a man whose entire life has been an exercise in patriotism."
- March 26 – In a letter to the speaker of the House of Representatives, President Johnson recounts his directing "the heads of executive departments and agencies to tighten operations, reduce employment and effect savings" and addresses a report from the director of the Bureau of the Budget.
- March 28 – President Johnson holds his eighth news conference in his office at the LBJ ranch, beginning the conference with an address on the surveys being conducted on the Anchorage area and towns as well as the anticipated receiving of the first Alaska report from Ed McDermott.
- March 28 – In a statement, President Johnson offers condolences to Alaskans in the aftermath of the earthquake that hit the state and his declaration of "a disaster area in Alaska, and I have assured Governor Egan that all possible help will be made available."

== April ==
- April 1 – President Johnson signs Executive Order 11149, establishing the President's Advisory Committee on Supersonic Transport as well as its membership and purpose of studying and recommending to the president "all aspects of the supersonic transport program".
- April 2 – In a message to President of Brazil Pascoal Ranieri Mazzilli, President Johnson transmits his "warmest good wishes" on Mazzilli becoming Brazil's president and adds that Americans "have watched with anxiety the political and economic difficulties through which your great nation has been passing, and have admired the resolute will of the Brazilian community to resolve these difficulties within a framework of constitutional democracy and without civil strife."
- April 2 – President Johnson signs Executive Order 11150, establishing the Federal Reconstruction and Development Planning Commission for Alaska and its functions.
- April 3 – In the Cabinet Room, President Johnson says the agreement reached between the United States and Panama "is both a beginning and a renewal. It provides that we will reestablish diplomatic relations, we will immediately appoint special ambassadors with sufficient powers to seek the prompt elimination of the causes of conflict between the two countries without limitations or preconditions of any kind." He confirms that he has informed President of Panama Roberto Francisco Chiari Remón about the wishes of the United States for former Treasury Secretary Robert B. Anderson to serve as American Ambassador in the talks between the two countries.
- April 3 – President Johnson delivers remarks commemorating the fifteenth anniversary of the signing of the North Atlantic Treaty in the East Room.
- April 4 – President Johnson holds his ninth news conference in the Cabinet Room, answering questions from reporters on if he has any comments on increasing criticism from presidential candidates on his handling of foreign policy, on if he has reached a definite determination on a trip to visit poverty-stricken areas in the United States, if he expects revisions to NATO in the coming years, the progress of the civil rights debate in the Senate, the Panama Canal treaty, his reaction to an exchange of criticism between China and Russia, whether he intends to make any new additions to the White House staff, his position on whether the actions of General de Gaulle are hurting the Western alliance, if he has any theories for why cattle prices remain low while meat prices are high, and what he thinks on loosening morals of the youth in America.
- April 5 – In a statement on the death of General Douglas MacArthur, President Johnson says he has given instruction that MacArthur be buried with all honors and that the United States is grateful for all 84 years of his life.
- April 5 – President Johnson signs Proclamation 3579, a response to the death of Douglas MacArthur ordering "that the flag of the United States shall be flown at half-staff in the District of Columbia and throughout the United States and its territories and possessions, upon all public buildings and grounds, at all military posts and naval stations, and on all naval vessels, until after his funeral shall have taken place" while directing "that the flag shall be flown at half-staff for the same length of time at all United States embassies, legations, consular offices, and other facilities abroad, including all military facilities and naval vessels and stations."
- April 7 – President Johnson delivers remarks to the Cabinet Committee on Export Expansion in the Fish Room.
- April 8 – President Johnson signs Executive Order 11151, suspending "the provisions of Section 5770 of Title 10 of the United States Code which require certain male officers on the active list in the line of the Navy to have had specified sea or foreign service before they may be promoted."
- April 9 – In a statement, President Johnson requests the parties in the railroad dispute "restore the status quo as it existed 2 days ago and to maintain this status quo for 20 days."
- April 9 – In a radio and television statement, President Johnson announces that after hours of meeting with representatives of the railroad management and the railroad brotherhoods that both parties "have agreed to postpone any action for 15 days while we seek to resolve the issues between them."
- April 9 – President Johnson delivers remarks to those participating in the "Plans for Progress" Equal Opportunity Agreements in the East Room.
- April 9 – In a statement, President Johnson says the House passing the cotton-wheat bill the previous day "represented good judgment and economic progress" and that the action "can forestall severe economic difficulties in areas where wheat is a major source of income and, in turn, this will sustain job levels in communities that serve the farmer and his family and manufacture the things he needs" while allowing taxpayers to "gain through lower costs as excess supplies of cotton and wheat are reduced to adequate reserve levels."
- April 18 – President Johnson holds his fourteenth news conference in his White House office. President Johnson begins the conference with an address on a "very general statement of our foreign policy" in addition to his approval of "the plans for a very comprehensive study of the draft system and of related manpower policies submitted to me by the Secretary of Defense" before answering questions from reporters on the first quarter on housing, who is behind the creation of the draft study, his reaction to the Supreme Court decision on the separation of state and church, if he saw any progress in relations between the United States and Soviet Union, and attributions to the improved economic outlook.
- April 20 – President Johnson attends a luncheon for foreign Affairs at the Associated Press at the Waldorf Astoria Hotel in New York City.
- April 20 – The White House releases "the text of a letter from Secretary of Defense Robert McNamara and Dr. Glenn T. Seaborg, Chairman of the Atomic Energy Commission, reporting their conclusions following a joint review conducted by the Department of Defense and the Atomic Energy Commission of the status of progress during the past 8 months on the implementation of the Limited Test Ban Treaty Safeguards recommended by the Joint Chiefs of Staff, and approved by the late President Kennedy."
- April 20 – In a message to the 73rd Continental Congress of the Daughters of the American Revolution, President Johnson challenges them "to even greater service to your fellow Americans--to continuing your humanitarian efforts on behalf of underprivileged children--to helping win the war against poverty--to pursuing your constructive activities in the preservation of the historic landmarks and the sites of our revolutionary past."
- April 20 – President Johnson says that Secretary of State Dean Rusk "has just made a very interesting and informative report on his meeting with SEATO and with Generalissimo Chiang Kai-shek and with Ambassador Lodge in Saigon."
- April 20 – William Randolph Lovelace II is sworn in as Director of Space Medicine for the Manned Space flight in the Cabinet Room.
- April 21 – President Johnson delivers remarks to Treasury Department officials on Equal Employment Opportunity in the Rose Garden.
- April 21 – President Johnson receives a citation from the Disciples of Christ Historical Society in his White House office.
- April 28 – In a letter to President pro tempore Hayden and House Speaker McCormick, President Johnson announces his intent to send Congress "a bill designed to make possible the economic development of the Appalachian Region" prior to divulging details relating to the legislation and advocating for its passage.
- April 29 – President Johnson delivers remarks to civil rights leaders in the East Room on the need for Congress to pass the administration's civil rights bill.
- April 30 – President Johnson signs Proclamation 3590, urging "the citizens of this Nation to observe Saturday, October 24, 1964, as United Nations Day by means of community programs which will demonstrate their faith in the United Nations and contribute to a fuller understanding of its aims, problems, and accomplishments" and calling "upon the officials of the Federal and State Governments and upon local officials to encourage citizen groups and agencies of the press, radio, television, and motion pictures to engage in appropriate observance of United Nations Day throughout the land in cooperation with the United States Committee for the United Nations and other organizations."
- April 30 – President Johnson signs Proclamation 3588, extending "the welcome of the people of the United States to those persons who come to our country to visit the New York World's Fair, and express the hope that they will take this opportunity to enjoy the hospitality of other parts of our Nation."
- April 30 – President Johnson signs Proclamation 3587, establishing an immigration quota "solely for the purpose of compliance with the pertinent provisions of the Immigration and Nationality Act and is not to be considered as having any significance extraneous to such purpose."
- April 30 – President Johnson signs Proclamation 3586, designating "the week beginning May 24, 1964, as Small Business Week" and urging the "chambers of commerce, boards of trade, and other public and private organizations to participate in ceremonies recognizing the great contribution made by the 4.6 million small businesses of this country to our prosperous society and to the well-being and happiness of our people."
- April 30 – President Johnson attends a meeting with the President's Committee on Employment of the Handicapped in the Departmental Auditorium in Washington.
- April 30 – President Johnson signs Proclamation 3589, proclaiming "the ensuing twelve months a period of commemoration of the beginnings of the office of the Presidency of the United States."
- April 30 – President Johnson commemorates the one hundred and seventy-fifth anniversary of the inauguration of George Washington in the Fish Room.
- April 30 – President Johnson delivers remarks at the 1964 Campaign Conference for Democratic Women at the Sheraton-Park Hotel in Washington.

== July ==
- July 1 – John T. McNaughton, Daniel Luevano, Solis Horwitz, and Robert W. Morse are sworn in as officials in the Defense Department in the Rose Garden.
- July 2 – President Johnson signs H.R. 6041 into law in the Cabinet Room. President Johnson says the legislation updates the Davis–Bacon Act and "sensibly provides that wage determinations shall, in addition to cash wages, take account of prevailing benefits such as medical and hospital care, pensions and workmen's compensation, unemployment insurance, vacations, holidays, and other such factors."
- July 2 – Maxwell D. Taylor is sworn in as United States Ambassador to South Vietnam in the Rose Garden.
- July 2 – Civil Rights Act of 1964
- July 4 – In a statement, President Johnson reveals the recipients of the Presidential Medal of Freedom.
- July 6 – President Johnson signs Executive Order 11160, prescribing "regulations relating to the medical care of certain retired personnel of the Coast and Geodetic Survey and dependents of Coast and Geodetic Survey ships' officers and crew members, both active and retired."
- July 6 – President Johnson signs Proclamation 3595, designating "the week beginning October 4, 1964, as Fire Prevention Week" and urging "State and local governments, the American National Red Cross, the Chamber of Commerce of the United States, and business, labor, and farm organizations, as well as schools, civic groups, and public-information agencies to observe Fire Prevention Week, to develop and employ effective means for disseminating fire safety information and recommendations to all citizens throughout the year, and promptly to undertake other effective community actions designed to eliminate the causes of preventable fires."
- July 6 – President Johnson signs Proclamation 3596, a proclamation of agreements with Paraguay and the United Arab Republic as it pertains to trade.
- July 7 – In telephonic remarks from the Cabinet Room, President Johnson addresses those participating in the ceremony for the laying down of USS Mariano G. Vellejo (SSBN-658) in Mare Island Naval Shipyard.
- July 7 – President Johnson delivers remarks to members of the President's Committee on Equal Employment Opportunity on his association with the committee prior to becoming president and their work in securing groundwork for the "peaceful acceptance of the Civil Rights Act of 1964" in the Rose Garden.
- July 7 – President Johnson signs Executive Order 11161, directing the Defense Secretary and Administrator of the Federal Aviation Agency "to prepare and develop plans, procedures, policies, programs, and courses of action in anticipation of the probable transfer of the Federal Aviation Agency to the Department of Defense in the event of war" and functions of the Federal Aviation Agency.
- July 7 – President Johnson signs Proclamation 3597, amending headnote 2(d) of part 3 of the Appendix to the Tariff Schedules of the United States (77A Stat. 441) and adding "Dried milk, dried cream, and dried whey provided for in part 4 of schedule 1:" to 950.01 of part 3 of the Appendix to the Tariff Schedules of the United States (77A Stat. 442) via amendment.
- July 7 – President Johnson signs Proclamation 3598, designating "July 9, 1964, as Monocacy Battle Centennial" and urging "those who can do so to attend the dedication ceremonies to be held on that date at the site of the battle" and allow "others, in their home communities, hold ceremonies honoring the brave men of both sides who fought there-men who represented no fewer than twelve States, from Vermont to Louisiana."
- July 8 – Attorney General Robert F. Kennedy introduces President Johnson at a meeting with American attorneys in the East Room. President Johnson states his hope that the attorneys "will be restless champions of the cause of equal justice for the poor as well as for the rich" in the same mold as RFK and support both the Civil Rights Act and civil liberties.
- July 8 – In a statement, President Johnson reflects on asking the now deceased Roy E. Davidson and other individuals "to help preserve collective bargaining in America" during the previous winter.
- July 8 – In a statement, President Johnson addresses the rising rate of joblessness of the American youth and says that the "program announced today is the latest and one of the most promising in a variety of efforts we are making to bring opportunity to neighborhoods where it has long been absent."
- July 9 – President Johnson signs the Urban Mass Transportation Act of 1964 into law in the Cabinet Room. President Johnson says the "long-needed, long-awaited, landmark legislation" remains faithful to the congressional vision of support for highways and airways for automobile and airplane travel.
- July 10 – President Johnson presents the Distinguished Service Medal to Admiral Felt in the Cabinet Room.
- July 11 – President Johnson holds his twenty-first news conference in the Cabinet Room. President Johnson begins the conference with an address on "some announcements and some appointments" in addition to discussing differences in the economy as well as the progress of auto negotiations before answering questions from reporters regarding the mission of FBI Director J. Edgar Hoover in Mississippi, comments made by Senator Goldwater about the Johnson administration, if cuts to the budget of the National Space Administration will derail American efforts to land a man on the moon during the 1960s, his series of meetings with Latin American ambassadors, if his oratorical propensities being recognized by the National Forensic Society will influence his decision to debate the Republican nominee during the election cycle, what he expects to emerge from the meeting of inter-American foreign ministers, and additional comments by Senator Goldwater on Johnson's ability to beat any Republican in the general election at this point.
- July 12 – In a letter to Chairman of the Massachusetts Institute of Technology James R. Killian, Jr., President Johnson thanks Killian's committee for completing a report that "deals with issues which are important in carrying out this Nation's commitment to deploy science and technology boldly and effectively in the interest of the Nation's welfare."
- July 12 – In a statement, President Johnson says the recommendation in the report of the Committee on Public Higher Education in the District of Columbia "should have the immediate attention of the Congress" and that he is asking "the District Commissioners to prepare a draft of appropriate legislation for submission to the Congress."
- July 14 – President Johnson signs Proclamation 3599, calling on Americans "to observe the week beginning October 11, 1964, as National School Lunch Week, with ceremonies and activities designed to promote public understanding and awareness of the significance of the school lunch program to the child, to the home, to the farm, to industry, and to the Nation."
- July 15 – In a statement, President Johnson says the federal government bears some of the responsibility for both illegal traffic in drugs and the consequences of that traffic and designates government departments "to examine into their present procedures, to bring those procedures into maximum activity, and, wherever necessary, put into effect additional programs of action aimed at major corrections in the conditions caused by drug abuse." He designates Lee White of the White House Staff "to act as liaison agent between them, with instructions to implement the foregoing directive."
- July 17 – President Johnson signs the Water Resources Research Act of 1964 into law. President Johnson says the legislation will form "local centers of water research", "enlist the intellectual power of universities and research institutes in a nationwide effort to conserve and utilize our water resources for the common benefit", and "contemplates a high degree of interstate cooperation".
- July 17 – President Johnson reports on changes in the gross national product and personal income as proof of the United States' "strong and balanced economic expansion".
- July 23 – President Johnson delivers remarks at a luncheon for a group of businessmen in the State Dining Room.
- July 24 – President Johnson delivers farewell remarks to Thailand General Praphas Charusathien from the West Wing.
- July 24 – President Johnson attends a reception for labor leader groups in the East Room.
- July 24 – President Johnson holds his twenty-third news conference in the State Department Auditorium. President Johnson begins the conference with announcements on "the successful development of a major new strategic manned aircraft system, which will be employed by the Strategic Air Command" and "that in the year ending July 30th American exports of farm products broke all records, reaching an all-time high of $6 billion 151 million" before answering questions with reporters on indications of Communist involvement in the racial violence in New York City, his meeting with Senator Goldwater, President de Gaulle's call "for France, Communist China, the Soviet Union, and the United States all to get out of Indochina and leave them to settle their problems themselves", his reaction to the Republican Convention rejecting an amendment to the party platform restating the traditional civilian authority over the military, the new leadership of the Congolese Government, if he and the Defense Department think there is room for a potential withdrawal of American military wives and children from Saigon "or other southeast Asian command posts in the foreseeable future", his views on a satisfying running mate for his campaign, the effect of Governor of Alabama George Wallace exiting the race, and how active he intents to be in his campaign.
- July 27 – In a statement, the White House says the "President has requested the Department of the Interior to collaborate with the Atomic Energy Commission, in consultation with the Office of Science and Technology, to develop a plan" for a program that would advance progress "in large-scale desalting of sea water."
- July 27 – President Johnson delivers remarks at the White House welcoming ceremony for President of Madagascar Philibert Tsiranana on the South Lawn.
- July 27 – President Johnson and Madagascar President Tsiranana deliver toasts at a state dinner in the Rose Garden.
- July 28 – President Johnson addresses delegates to the Conference on International Rural Development in the Rose Garden.
- July 28 – President Johnson signs H.R. 6237 into law in the Cabinet Room. President Johnson says the legislation "will be a major step forward in assisting both public and private groups to preserve the records of our times" and thanks Representative Jack Brooks for suggesting the gathering.
- July 28 – President Johnson signs Proclamation 3602, proclaiming "the month of December 1964 as United States International Aviation Month" and inviting "the Governors of the States, the Commonwealth of Puerto Rico, the Commissioners of the District of Columbia, and appropriate officials in other areas subject to the jurisdiction of the United States to issue similar proclamations and to join in the observance of the event at all appropriate levels."
- July 28 – President Johnson signs Executive Order 11162, amending Executive Order 10925 to include "(c) The Secretary of Defense, the Attorney General, the Postmaster General, the Secretary of Commerce, the Secretary of Health, Education, and Welfare, the Secretaries of the Army, Navy, and Air Force, the Chairman of the Atomic Energy Commission, the Administrator of the National Aeronautics and Space Administration, the Administrator of the Housing and Home Finance Agency, the Administrator of General Services, and the Chairman of the Civil Service Commission. Each such member may designate an alternate to represent him in his absence."
- July 28 – President Johnson signs Executive Order 11163, designating that a certain "tract of land be included in and reserved as a part of the Chattahoochee National Forest, such inclusion and reservation to be in accordance with and subject to all of the provisions and conditions of the agreement of May 21, 1964, between the Tennessee Valley Authority and the United States Department of Agriculture".
- July 29 – President Johnson delivers remarks to members of the National Agricultural Advisory Commission in the Fish Room.
- July 29 – In a statement, President Johnson announces that the "White House meeting will be an intellectual convocation of the States" and that the objective of the meeting will be seeing each state commence "a study group of the highest expertness--consisting of men and women drawn from all the faculties in the State and of experts outside the universities--which at a specific time will be ready to report on the problems and possibilities of that particular State and region during the coming decades."
- July 30 – In a statement, President Johnson says that with respect to his choice for a running mate, he has reached "the conclusion that it would be inadvisable for me to recommend to the convention any member of the Cabinet or any of those who meet regularly with the Cabinet." Johnson adds that he has personally notified Secretary of State Dean Rusk, Secretary of Defense Robert McNamara, Attorney General Robert F. Kennedy, and Agriculture Secretary Orville Freeman of his decision due to their names being mentioned in the press as possible choices for the vice presidential nomination.
- July 30 – In a statement, President Johnson says the President's Council on Physical Fitness's progress report "shows impressively that America's abundance is not encouraging apathy and our self-sufficiency is not breeding self-indulgence" and the "remarkable response and imposing progress toward instilling in our youth the good habits of physical fitness" that has occurred since the program began three years ago under the previous administration.
- July 30 – President Johnson delivers remarks on the education-related legislation passed by the 88th United States Congress in the past year to state and local school officials in the East Room.
- July 30 – President Johnson awards the Distinguished Service Medal to General McKee in the Rose Garden.
- July 30 – President Johnson holds his twenty-fourth news conference in his White House office. President Johnson begins with an address marking the developments of the nuclear test ban treaty signed under the Kennedy administration and answers questions from reporters on the influence of gathering voters from televised debates like in the 1960 presidential election, what criteria he has for a vice presidential candidate, and if he has alternated his economic policies.
- July 31 – In a statement, President Johnson congratulates Ranger 7 as well as NASA, the Jet Propulsion Laboratory, and associates in the industrial laboratories. President Johnson says the images obtained on the lunar surface will be helpful in guiding "in constructing the lunar excursion module and in planning the trip" and allowing the United States the ability to "be able to build our lunar landing equipment with greater certainty and knowledge of the conditions which our astronauts will encounter on the moon."
- July 31 – In a Rose Garden address, President Johnson reflects on the twentieth anniversary of the Warsaw Uprising and the decision "to cease the valiant fight was dictated and required by lack of food, a lack of water, a lack of ammunition, and a desire to save the remaining civilian population from systematic destruction. Eighty percent of Warsaw had been destroyed."
- July 31 – President Johnson signs Proclamation 3603, designating "August 1, 1961, as Warsaw Uprising Day" and inviting "the people of the United States to observe this day with appropriate ceremonies and activities, and I urge them to mark this event as an exceptional demonstration of man's courage and devotion in the long and continuing struggle for human freedom."

== August ==
- August 1 – In a letter to Manlio Brosio, President Johnson to express his "warm congratulations on the occasion of your assumption of duties as Secretary General of NATO" and speaks on the improvements made by NATO since the signing of the North Atlantic Treaty.
- August 1 – President Johnson attends a briefing with space scientists on the flight to the Moon in the Cabinet Room.
- August 1 – In a statement, President Johnson says he has advised United States Secretary of Labor W. Willard Wirtz on the subject of "both the New York Shipping Association and the International Longshoremen's Association, AFL-CIO, have jointly requested the appointment of a board of neutrals to assist them in their current contract negotiations."
- August 3 – President Johnson delivers remarks to foreign language newspaper publishers on their role in American unity in the East Room.
- August 3 – In a statement, President Johnson announces that he has directed the United States Navy "to continue the patrols in the Gulf of Tonkin off the coast of North Viet-Nam", double "the force by adding an additional destroyer to the one already on patrol", providing "a combat air patrol over the destroyers" and "orders to the commanders of the combat aircraft and the two destroyers (a) to attack any force which attacks them in international waters, and (b) to attack with the objective not only of driving off the force but of destroying it."
- August 4 – In remarks broadcast on the radio and television, President Johnson discusses the renewed aggression on the Gulf of Tonkin and announces that he has "instructed the Secretary of State to make this position totally clear to friends and to adversaries and, indeed, to all" and "instructed Ambassador Stevenson to raise this matter immediately and urgently before the Security Council of the United Nations."
- August 5 – President Johnson delivers remarks on the United States having spent the previous decade under his leadership as well as that of his predecessors Dwight D. Eisenhower and John F. Kennedy to respond with action after "threats to the peace and security of the peoples of southeast Asia from the Communist government of North Viet-Nam" at the dedication of the new journalism building at Syracuse University.
- August 5 – In a special message to Congress, President Johnson recommends "a Resolution expressing the support of the Congress for all necessary action to protect our armed forces and to assist nations covered by the SEATO Treaty" and assures Congress that "we shall continue readily to explore any avenues of political solution that will effectively guarantee the removal of Communist subversion and the preservation of the independence of the nations of the area."
- August 6 – President Johnson and Secretary General U Thant deliver toasts at a dinner in the State Dining Room.
- August 6 – President Johnson delivers remarks to the secretary general of the United Nations in the Rose Garden.
- August 6 – President Johnson signs Proclamation 3604, officially recognizing and proclaiming "the ninetieth birthday of the Honorable Herbert Hoover, August 10, 1964" and urging "the people of the United States to pause on that day to reflect upon the many accomplishments of this distinguished American on behalf of all humanity."
- August 7 – In a statement, President Johnson says congressional passage of the "Joint Resolution on Southeast Asia is a demonstration to all the world of the unity of all Americans" and that this has proven the determination of the United States "to defend our own forces, to prevent aggression, and to work firmly and steadily for peace and security in the area."
- August 8 – In a statement, President Johnson says the House's approval of the economic opportunity bill is a sign of the United States' commitment to the war on poverty and calls "upon all who share concern for the character of their own communities to enlist in this war against the blight and blemish of the poverty which exists amid plenty."
- August 8 – President Johnson holds his twenty-fifth news conference in his office at the LBJ Ranch. President Johnson begins the conference with an address on Southeast Asia and answers question from reporters on results in the Mississippi investigation, if he has any intent to send American diplomats to neutralist capitals, motives in Vietnam attacks, if he has communicated with former president Dwight D. Eisenhower about the air strikes, and rumors of a possible price increase in steel.
- August 10 – Gulf of Tonkin Resolution
- August 11 – President Johnson delivers remarks to members of the National Association of Counties at a reception on the South Lawn.
- August 11 – President Johnson attends a ceremony marking the issuance of the "Register and Vote" Stamp in the East Room.
- August 12 – President Johnson signs the military pay bill into law in the Cabinet Room. President Johnson says the legislation "is an answer to those who would libel his loyalty to our civilian society or slander his sense of responsibility for the trust he bears to all mankind."
- August 12 – President Johnson delivers remarks to the American Bar Association at the Waldorf Hotel in New York City.
- August 13 – President Johnson delivers remarks at a luncheon for a group of state university presidents in the East Room.
- August 13 – President Johnson signs the Federal Aid Highway Act of 1964 into law in the Cabinet Room. President Johnson reflects on the passage of the Federal Aid Highway Act of 1956 and says the legislation "helps to provide us better primary and secondary highways on a 50/ 50 basis with the States" and supports "needed efforts to improve forest highways, public land roads and national park roads, and other such purposes."
- August 14 – President Johnson delivers remarks on the occasion of the commissioning of the USS Casimir Pulaski via telephone from the Cabinet Room.
- August 14 – President Johnson signs the Government Employees Salary Reform Act of 1964 into law. President Johnson says the legislation "ranks near the top of the list in importance to the entire country" out of the multiple measures enacted that year and marks the first time the government has been given "the tools to identify and inspire, to reward and retain excellence in our Federal service."
- August 15 – President Johnson signs Executive Order 11166, ordering that all "lands and other property hereinafter described, being lands and property which were ceded to the United States by the Republic of Hawaii under the joint resolution of annexation, approved July 7, 1898 (30 Stat. 750), or which have been acquired in exchange for lands or properties so ceded, are hereby set aside for the use of the United States* in fee simple subject to valid existing rights".
- August 15 – President Johnson signs Executive Order 11167, authorizing the use of Kaobe, Puuanahulu, and Hummuula by the United States.
- August 15 – President Johnson signs Proclamation 3607, designating "the years 1964 and 1965 as a period in which all persons are especially invited to see the United States" and urging "our own citizens, and all other people, to visit our historic shrines and our natural wonders during this period, and to explore and enjoy our great recreational areas and facilities."
- August 15 – President Johnson signs Proclamation 3606, designating "the week of November 15 through November 21, 1964, as National Freedom from Hunger Week" and asking "the American Freedom from Hunger Foundation to take national leadership in planning appropriate observance of National Freedom from Hunger Week." President Johnson directs "the departments and agencies of the Federal Government which have responsibilities in the field of food, nutrition, and international relations to take appropriate steps to observe, and to cooperate with private groups in observing, National Freedom from Hunger Week."
- August 15 – President Johnson signs Proclamation 3605, designating "Sunday, October 11, 1964, as General Pulaski's Memorial Day" and directing "the appropriate Government officials to display the flag of the United States on all Government buildings on that day."
- August 15 – President Johnson signs Executive Order 11165, authorizing the United States to use land on the Fort Shafter Military Reservation.
- August 26 – President Johnson signs S. 3075 into law in the Cabinet Room. President Johnson says the legislation "now represents the most significant amendment to the atomic energy legislation that has been passed since 1954" and is the first to authorize "private ownership in the United States of special nuclear materials--the materials used as fuels for nuclear plants."
- August 27 – President Johnson accepts the nomination of Democratic Party candidate for President of the United States at the Democratic National Convention.
- August 28 – President Johnson delivers remarks via telephone opening the Parade of Progress in downtown Cleveland, Ohio.
- August 28 – President Johnson delivers remarks in Atlantic City Before the Democratic National Committee in Room 20 at Convention Hall in Atlantic City, New Jersey.
- August 29 – President Johnson delivers remarks advocating for the re-election of Ralph Yarborough during an appearance at a local rodeo arena in Stonewall, Texas.
- August 30 – In a filmed message to the delegates to the third International Conference on the Peaceful Uses of Atomic Energy, President Johnson says the federal government "is proceeding with an aggressive program of nuclear desalting" and invites the International Atomic Energy Agency "to play an ever larger role in these peaceful efforts."
- August 31 – President Johnson signs the Food Stamp Act of 1964 into law in the Cabinet Room. President Johnson says the legislation "weds the best of the humanitarian instincts of the American people with the best of the free enterprise system" and "permits us to use our highly efficient commercial food distribution system."
- August 31 – President Johnson delivers telephonic remarks at the Convention of the Plasterers' Union from the LBJ Ranch.

== September ==
- September 3 – President Johnson signs the Wilderness Act into law.
- September 16 – President Johnson celebrates the recent ratification of the Columbia River Treaty with Canadian prime minister Lester B. Pearson.

== October ==
- October 1 – Philip Nichols, Jr. and Linton McGee Collins as Judge of the United States Customs Court and Judge of the United States Court of Claims in the State Dining Room.
- October 1 – In a letter to Deputy Attorney General Nicholas Katzenbach, President Johnson directs Katzenbach "pursuant to the provisions of Section 208 of the Labor Management Relations Act, 1947, to petition in the name of the United States any District Court of the United States having jurisdiction of the parties to enjoin the continuance of such strike and for such other relief as may in your judgment be necessary or appropriate."
- October 1 – President Johnson delivers remarks to students and faculty of Johns Hopkins University in addition to the university's president Milton Eisenhower as part of the university's lecture series.
- October 2 – In State Dining Room remarks, President Johnson designates 1965 as "International Cooperation Year" and announces that he is "appointing a special Cabinet Committee" to direct work relating to international partnerships.
- October 14 – Martin Luther King Jr. is awarded the Nobel Peace Prize.
- October 15 – Nikita Khrushchev is replaced by Leonid Brezhnev.

== November ==
- November 3 – President Johnson wins re-election against Senator Barry Goldwater from Arizona, the Republican candidate.
