= Colin Ryan =

Colin Ryan may refer to:

- Colin Ryan (Clare hurler) (born 1988), Irish hurler for Clare
- Colin Ryan (actor) (born 1986), English actor
- Colin Ryan (Limerick hurler) (born 1996), Irish hurler
