= Seán Loftus (hurler) =

Irish hurler (born 1997)

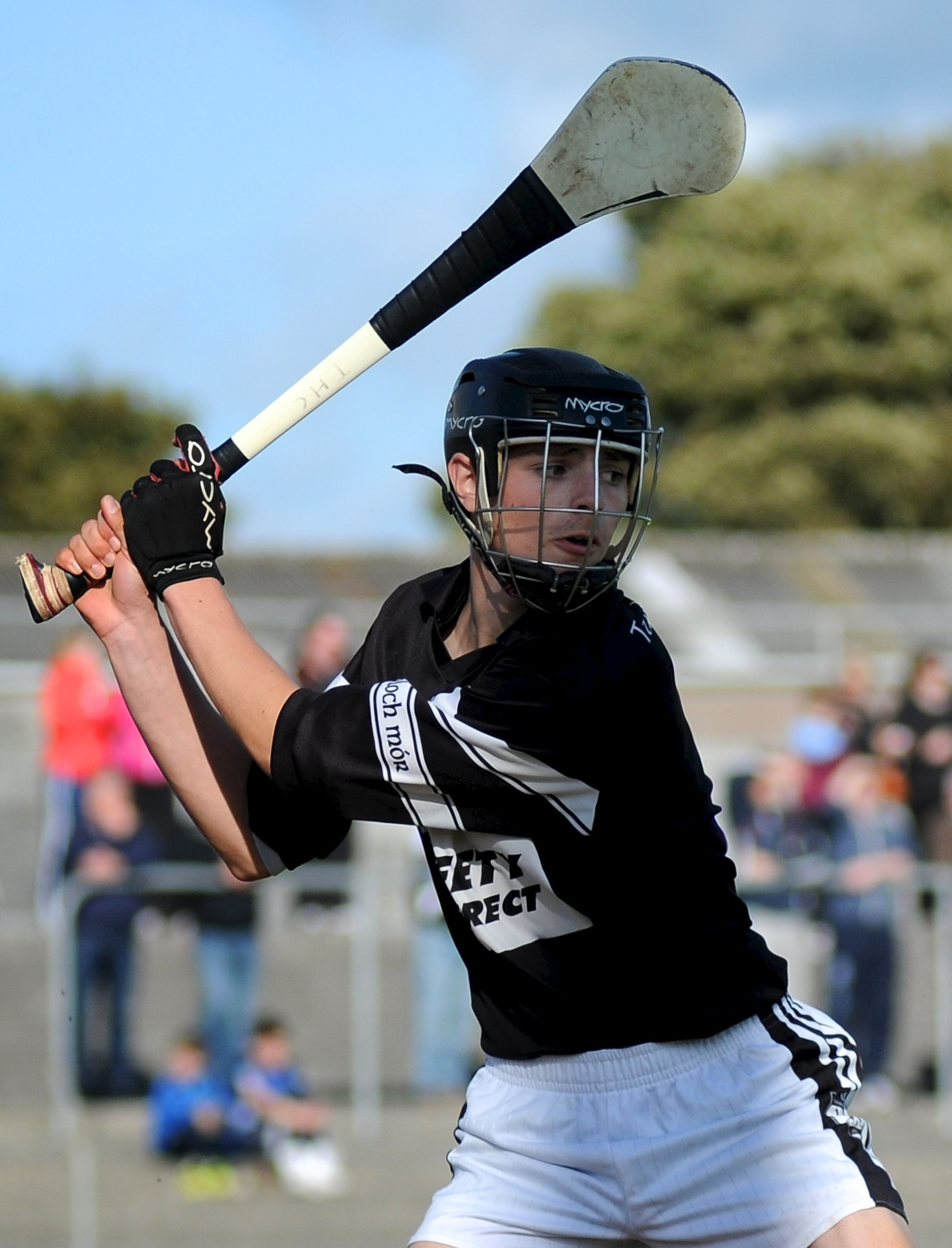
- Loftus in 2013

Personal information
- Born: 1997 (age 28–29) Turloughmore, County Galway, Ireland
- Occupation: Student
- Height: 6 ft 0 in (183 cm)

Sport
- Sport: Hurling
- Position: Midfield
Club
- Years: Club
- Turloughmore
Club titles
- Galway titles: 0
College
- Years: College
- 2016–: NUI Galway
College titles
- Fitzgibbon titles: 0
Inter-county*
Years	County	Apps (scores)
2017–2022	Galway	9 (0-02)
Inter-county titles
- Leinster titles: 2
- All-Irelands: 1
- NHL: 2
- All Stars: 0
- *Inter County team apps and scores correct as of 17:49, 3 January 2018.

Seán Loftus (born 1997) is an Irish hurler who plays for Galway Senior Championship club Turloughmore and at inter-county level with the Galway senior hurling team. He is usually deployed as a corner-back, but can also be deployed at midfield.

== Playing career ==
=== Presentation College Athenry ===
Loftus attended the Presentation College in Athenry with whom he played hurling at all grades. On 2 March 2014, he was at left wing-back when the college defeated St. Brigid's College from Loughrea by 1–16 to 0–16 to win the Connacht Championship. On 9 March 2015, he scored a point from left wing-back when Presentation College defeated St. Brigid's College by 0–15 to 0–06 to win a second successive Connacht Championship. On 20 February 2016, Loftus scored 1-02 from play when Presentation College secured their third successive Connacht Championship after a 2–17 to 1–16 defeat of Fort Community School.

=== Turloughmore ===
Loftus joined the Turloughmore club at a young age and played in all grades at juvenile and underage levels. On 9 November 2013, he lined out as goalkeeper when Turloughmore defeated Liam Mellows in a replay by 1–18 to 1–10 to win the Galway Minor Championship. Loftus switched to an outfield position when Turloughmore retained the championship title in 2014.

=== Galway ===
==== Minor and under-21 ====
Loftus made his first appearance for the Galway minor team on 17 August 2014 when he came on as a 27th-minute substitute in a 1–27 to 2-09 All-Ireland semi-final defeat by Limerick. He was eligible for the minor grade again the following year and was appointed captain of the team. On 6 September 2015, Loftus scored a point from left corner-forward when Galway defeated Tipperary by 4–13 to 1–16 in the All-Ireland final.

In 2016, Loftus progressed straight onto the Galway under-21 team. On 10 September 2016, he was at left wing-back when Galway suffered a 5–15 to 0–14 defeat by Waterford in the All-Ireland final.

On 4 July 2018, Loftus was at midfield when Galway defeated Wexford by 4–21 to 2–26 to win their first ever Leinster Championship title.

==== Senior ====
Loftus made his first appearance for the Galway senior hurling team on 5 March 2017 in a 3–31 to 1–11 defeat of Laois in the National Hurling League. On 23 April, he came on as a 70th-minute substitute for Paul Killeen when Galway defeated Tipperary by 3–21 to 0–14 in the 2017 National League final. Loftus made his first championship appearance on 18 June, coming on as a substitute for Adrian Tuohey, in Galway's 0–33 to 0-11 Leinster semi-final defeat of Offaly. He later won his first Leinster Championship medal, as a non-playing substitute, when Galway defeated Wexford by 0–29 to 1–17 in the subsequent final. On 3 September 2017, Loftus was an unused substitute when Galway won their first All-Ireland Championship title in 29 years after a 0–26 to 2–17 defeat of Waterford in the final.

On 8 July 2018, Loftus came on as a 69th-minute substitute for David Burke to win his second Leinster Championship medal after a 1–28 to 3–15 defeat of Kilkenny in the final. In the subsequent All-Ireland final against Limerick on 19 August, Loftus started the game on the bench but was introduced after 60 minutes as a replacement for Johnny Coen. Galway were beaten by 3–16 to 2–18.

== Honours ==
Presentation College, Athenry

- Connacht Colleges Senior Hurling Championship (3): 2014, 2015, 2016

Turloughmore

- Galway Minor Hurling Championship (2): 2013, 2014

Galway

- All-Ireland Senior Hurling Championship (1): 2017
- Leinster Senior Hurling Championship (2): 2017, 2018
- National Hurling League (2): 2017, 2021
- Leinster Under-21 Hurling Championship (1): 2018
- All-Ireland Minor Hurling Championship (1): 2015

== Career statistics ==
As of match played 19 August 2018.

Team	Year	National League			Leinster		All-Ireland		Total	
Team	Year	Division	Apps	Score	Apps	Score	Apps	Score	Apps	Score
Galway	2017	Division 1B	4	0-00	3	0-00	0	0-00	7	0-00
Galway	2018	Division 1B	4	0-05	4	0-02	2	0-00	10	0-07
Total			8	0-05	7	0-02	2	0-00	17	0-07

Sporting positions
Preceded by Seán Linnane	Galway minor hurling team captain 2015	Succeeded by Jack Fitzpatrick
Achievements
Preceded by Darragh Joyce	All-Ireland Minor Hurling Final winning captain 2015	Succeeded by Brian McGrath
