= Colin Ryan (Limerick hurler) =

Irish hurler (born 1996)

Personal information
- Native name: Cóilín Ó Riain (Irish)
- Nickname: Mala
- Born: 1996 (age 29–30) Pallasgreen, County Limerick, Ireland
- Height: 5 ft 11 in (180 cm)

Sport
- Sport: Hurling
- Position: Midfielder
Club
- Years: Club
- Pallasgreen
Club titles
- Limerick titles: 0
College
- Years: College
- Limerick Institute of Technology
College titles
- Fitzgibbon titles: 0
Inter-county*
Years	County	Apps (scores)
2017-present	Limerick	0 (0–00)
Inter-county titles
- Munster titles: 2
- All-Irelands: 2
- NHL: 2
- All Stars: 0
- *Inter County team apps and scores correct as of 22:19, 20 July 2026.

Colin Ryan (born 1996) is an Irish hurler who plays as a midfielder for club side Pallasgreen and at inter-county level with the Limerick senior hurling team.

== Playing career ==
=== Club ===
Ryan joined the Pallasgreen club at a young age and played in all grades at juvenile and underage levels before joining the club's top adult team. On 15 November 2014, he was Pallasgreen's top scorer with five points when the club won the Limerick Intermediate Championship following an 0–11 to 0–08 defeat of Monaleen in the final.

=== Inter-county ===
==== Minor and under-21 ====
Ryan first played for the Limerick minor hurling team at the age of seventeen. On 23 July 2013, he was in goal when Limerick won their first Munster Championship title in 29 years after a 1–20 to 4–08 defeat of Waterford in a replay of the final.

Ryan was eligible for the minor grade again the following year and won a second successive Munster Championship medal as an outfield player after a 0–24 to 0–18 second successive defeat of Waterford in a replay of the final. On 7 September 2014, he was at right wing-back for Limerick's 2–17 to 0–19 defeat by Kilkenny in the All-Ireland final.

Ryan subsequently joined the Limerick under-21 hurling team and won a Munster Championship medal in his first season after a 0–22 to 0–19 win over Clare in the final. On 12 September 2015, Ryan was at right corner-forward when Limerick defeated Wexford by 0–26 to 1–07 in the All-Ireland final.

After surrendering their titles in 2016, Ryan won a second Munster Championship medal after a 0–16 to 1–11 defeat of Cork in the final the following year. On 9 September 2017, Ryan was at midfield in Limerick's 0–17 to 0–11 defeat of Kilkenny in the All-Ireland final. He was later named on the Bord Gáis Energy Team of the Year.

==== Senior ====
On 19 February 2017, Ryan made his senior debut at right wing-back in a 6–21 to 3–08 defeat of Kerry in the National Hurling League. He was an unused substitute during Limerick's subsequent championship campaign.

On 19 August 2018, Ryan was a member of the extended panel when Limerick won their first All-Ireland title in 45 years after a 3–16 to 2–18 defeat of Galway in the final.

On 31 March 2019, Ryan was named on the bench for Limerick's National League final meeting with Waterford at Croke Park. He collected a winners' medal as a non-playing substitute in the 1–24 to 0–19 victory. On 30 June 2019, Ryan won a Munster Championship medal as a non-playing substitute following Limerick's 2–26 to 2–14 defeat of Tipperary in the final.

Ryan won the 2021 M Donnelly All-Ireland Poc Fada Championship.

== Career statistics ==
As of match played 27 July 2019.

Team	Year	National League			Munster		All-Ireland		Total	
Team	Year	Division	Apps	Score	Apps	Score	Apps	Score	Apps	Score
Limerick	2017	Division 1B	3	1-01	0	0-00	0	0-00	3	1-01
Limerick	2018	Division 1B	5	0-06	0	0-00	0	0-00	5	0-06
Limerick	2019	Division 1A	4	0-03	0	0-00	0	0-00	4	0-03
Total			12	1–10	0	0-00	0	0-00	12	1–10

== Honours ==
Pallasgreen

- Limerick Intermediate Hurling Championship (1): 2014

Limerick

- All-Ireland Senior Hurling Championship (2): 2018, 2026
- Munster Senior Hurling Championship (2): 2019, 2026
- National Hurling League (2): 2019, 2026
- All-Ireland Under-21 Hurling Championship (2): 2015, 2017
- Munster Under-21 Hurling Championship (2): 2015, 2017
- Munster Minor Hurling Championship (2): 2013, 2014
