= St. Raphael's College, Loughrea =

St. Raphael’s College, Loughrea

Location
- Baunoge; Loughrea, County Galway; Ireland

Information
- Type: Voluntary secondary school
- Principal: John Hardiman
- Teaching staff: 35
- Gender: Male and Female
- Enrollment: 700
- Colour
- Affiliation: CEIST
- Website: http://saintraphaels.ie/

St. Raphael's College is a co-educational Catholic voluntary secondary school in Loughrea, County Galway.

== History ==
The college was originally founded as an all-girls day and boarding school by the Clonfert Sisters of Mercy in 1917. In 1974, it amalgamated with the nearby St. Brendan's De La Salle School, which had been founded in 1947. It has since offered co-education to boys and girls in this area.

== Organisation ==
It operates under the trusteeship of CEIST.
