= Connacht Colleges Senior Hurling Championship =

Hurling competition in Ireland

Connacht GAA PPS Senior A Hurling Championship
- Irish: Craobh Chonnacht
- Code: Hurling
- Founded: 1938; 88 years ago
- Region: Connacht (GAA)
- Trophy: John Ryan Cup
- No. of teams: 5
- Title holders: Presentation College (14th title)
- First winner: Roscommon CBS
- Most titles: St Mary's College (25 titles)
- Sponsors: Mezzino
- Official website: Official website

The Connacht GAA Post-Primary Schools Senior A Hurling Championship is an annual inter-schools hurling competition organised by the Connacht Council of the Gaelic Athletic Association. It is the highest inter-schools hurling competition in the province of Connacht, and has been contested every year, except on two occasions, since 1938.

The final, usually held in February, serves as the culmination of a round robin and knockout series of games played between October and January. Eligible players must be under the age of 19.

The Connacht Colleges Championship is an integral part of the wider All-Ireland Colleges Championship. The winners and runners-up of the Connacht final, like their counterparts in the Munster and Leinster Championships, advance to the All-Ireland quarter-finals or semi-finals.

The title has been won at least once by 14 different schools, 8 of which have won the title more than once. The all-time record-holders are St Mary's College, who have won the competition 25 times.

St Raphael's College are the current (2024) champions.

== History ==
While hurling championships for schools in Leinster and Munster had been organised since 1918, it would be another 20 years before a similar competition was established in Connacht. Participation was limited to voluntary secondary schools. Roscommon CBS were the winners of the inaugural championship and claimed a second consecutive title in 1939. They remain the only County Roscommon school to have won the title, as County Galway schools have claimed every available title since then.

St Mary's College dominated the early years of the championship, winning 20 of their titles between 1940 and 1967. Presentation College, Athenry and Our Ladys College, Gort shared nine titles during the 1970s, before st Joseph's College, Garbally emerged as a new force in the 1980s. St Raphael's College, Loughrea won five titles throughout the nineties, while they also became the first Connacht team to win the Dr Croke Cup. Gort Community School dominated the championship at the turn of the century, winning all ten of their titles in a 12-year period between 1999 and 2010. Mercy Colleges, a team made up of players from St Raphael's, Loughrea and Mercy College, Woodford, became the first amalgamation to win the title in 2013. Since then, Presentation College, Athenry have emerged to become the dominant force.

== Current format ==
=== Participating teams ===
The following five teams participated in the 2023 championship:

Team	Location	Colours
Coláiste Bhaile Chláir	Claregalway	Blue and white
Gort Community School	Gort	Black and white
Presentation College	Athenry	Maroon and white
St Brigid's College	Loughrea	Blue and navy
St Raphael's College	Loughrea	Green and red

=== Championship ===
The championship begins with a group stage of five teams. Each team meets the others in the group once in a round-robin format. The first-ranked team automatically qualifies for the final. The second and third-ranked teams play off in a lone semi-final.

=== Qualification for the All-Ireland Championship ===
As of 2014, the winners and runners up of the Connacht Championship qualify for the All-Ireland Colleges Championship. The runners-up qualify for the quarter-finals, while on some occasions the champions receive a bye to the semi-final stage (however, this is done in rotation with the Munster and Leinster champions).

== Sponsorship ==
Mezzino Student Accommodation became the title sponsor of the championship for a five-year period in September 2020.

== Trophy and medals ==
The John Ryan Cup is the current prize for winning the championship. It is named in honour of John Ryan who won a colleges title with Presentation College, Athenry in 1976 before being part of the Galway team that won the All-Ireland SHC title in 1980. The cup is held by the winning team until the following year's final. In accordance with GAA rules, the Connacht Council awards a set of gold medals to the championship winners.

== Roll of honour ==
#	Team	Won	Years won
1	St Mary's College	25	1940, 1941, 1942, 1946, 1947, 1949, 1950, 1951, 1952, 1953, 1954, 1955, 1956, 1957, 1960, 1963, 1964, 1965, 1966, 1967, 1979, 1988, 1989, 1990, 1994
2	Presentation College, Athenry	14	1970, 1971, 1976, 1977, 2010, 2011, 2014, 2015, 2016, 2018, 2019, 2022, 2023, 2025. 2026
3	Our Lady's College, Gort	10	1969, 1972, 1973, 1974, 1975, 1978, 1981, 1982, 1984, 1993
4	Gort Community School	9	1999, 2000, 2001, 2003, 2005, 2006, 2007, 2008, 2009
4	St Raphael's College	8	1991, 1992, 1995, 1996, 1997, 1998, 2004, 2020, 2023
6	St Joseph's College, Garbally	7	1959, 1968, 1980, 1983, 1985, 1986, 1987
7	Roscommon CBS	2	1938, 1939
7	St Molaise's College, Portumna	2	1961, 1962
9	De La Salle, Loughrea	1	1948
9	St Joseph's Patrician College	1	1958
9	Mercy College, Woodford	1	2002
9	Portumna Community School	1	2012
9	Mercy Colleges	1	2013
9	St Brigid's College, Loughrea	1	2017

== List of finals ==
Year	Winners	Score	Runners-up	Score
1980	Garbally College	1-07	Portumna College	0-06
1981	Our Lady's College	2–13	Portumna College	0-02
1982	Garbally College	2-07	Our Lady's College	0-03
1983	Garbally College	6–12	Presentation College	0-02
1984	Our Lady's College	3-04	Garbally College	1-08
1985	Garbally College	2-09	Our Lady's College	1-07
1986	Garbally College	2-03	Presentation College	1-04
1987	Garbally College	2-08	St Mary's College	0-05
1988	St Mary's College	0-08	Portumna Community School	0-07
1989	St Mary's College	1-07	Garbally College	1-05
1990	St Mary's College	0-09	St Raphael's College	0-06
1991	St Raphael's College	2-07	St Mary's College	0–10
1992	St Raphael's College	2–12	Portumna Community School	1-04
1993	Our Lady's College	1-08	Garbally College	1-06
1994	St Mary's College	1–12	St Raphael's College	3-02
1995	St Raphael's College	5–13	Portumna Community School	1-09
1996	St Raphael's College	4-05	Portumna Community School	1-06
1997	St Raphael's College	1–12	Presentation College	1-06
1998	St Raphael's College	1–12	Presentation College	0-07
1999	Gort Community School	0–13	St Mary's College	1-05
2000	Gort Community School	2–19	St Raphael's College	0-08
2001	Gort Community School	3–18	St Raphael's College	0-04
2002	Mercy College	1–12	Gort Community School	0-08
2003	Gort Community School	3-09	St Raphael's College	0-04
2004	St Raphael's College	3–12	Portumna Community School	2–11
2005	Gort Community School	6-03	Galway City Colleges	2–12
2006	Gort Community School	2–16	Portumna Community School	0–13
2007	Gort Community School	2–15	Portumna Community School	0-04
2008	Gort Community School	2–16	Mercy Colleges	0–15
2009	Gort Community School	2–14	Portumna Community School	0-08
2010	Presentation College	1–13	Gort Community School	2-09
2011	Presentation College	4-08	Mercy Colleges	1-07
2012	Portumna Community School	2–10	Mercy Colleges	0–12
2013	Mercy Colleges	0–14	Presentation College	0-09
2014	Presentation College	1–16	St Brigid's College	0–16
2015	Presentation College	0–15	St Brigid's College	0-06
2016	Presentation College	2–17	Gort Community School	1–16
2017	St Brigid's College	1–12	Presentation College	0–14
2018	Presentation College	2–19	Gort Community School	1-08
2019	Presentation College	1–14	Gort Community School	0–10
2020	St Raphael's College	1–10	Presentation College	0-09
2021	Cancelled due to the COVID-19 pandemic			
2022	Presentation College	1–12	Gort Community School	1-09
2023	Presentation College	0–19	St. Raphael's College	2–10
2024	St. Raphael's College	0–14	Presentation College	0–12
2025	Presentation College	3–15	Coláiste Bhaile Chláir	0-09
2026	Presentation College	1-21	St. Raphael's College	1–18

Notes:

- 1994 - The first match ended in a draw: St Mary's College 2–13, St Raphael's College 5-04.

== Records and statistics ==
=== Final ===
- Most wins: 25:
  - St Mary's College, Galway (1940, 1941, 1942, 1946, 1947, 1949, 1950, 1951, 1952, 1953, 1954, 1955, 1956, 1957, 1960, 1963, 1964, 1965, 1966, 1967, 1979, 1988, 1989, 1990, 1994)
- Most consecutive wins: 9:
  - St Mary's College, Galway (1949, 1950, 1951, 1952, 1953, 1954, 1955, 1956, 1957)

=== Teams ===
==== By decade ====
The most successful college of each decade, judged by number of championship titles, is as follows:

- 1930s: 2 for Roscommon CBS (1938–39)
- 1940s: 6 for St Mary's College (1940-41-42-46-47-49)
- 1950s: 8 for St Mary's College (1950-51-52-53-54-55-56-57)
- 1960s: 6 for St Mary's College (1960-63-64-65-66-67)
- 1970s: 5 for Our Lady's College (1972-73-74-75-78)
- 1980s: 5 for St Joseph's College (1980-83-85-86-87)
- 1990s: 6 for St Raphael's College (1991-92-95-96-97-98)
- 2000s: 8 for Gort Community School (2000-01-03-05-06-07-08-09)
- 2010s: 7 for Presentation College, Athenry (2010-11-14-15-16-18-19)
- 2020s: 2 for Presentation College, Athenry (2022–23)

==== Gaps ====
Longest gaps between successive championship titles:

- 33 years: Presentation College, Athenry (1977–2010)
- 16 years: St. Raphael's College (2004–2020)
- 12 years: St Mary's College (1967–1979)
- 12 years: St Joseph's College (1968–1980)
- 9 years: St Joseph's College (1959–1968)
- 9 years: St Mary's College (1979–1988)
- 9 years: Our Lady's College (1984–1993)
