= Presentation College, Athenry =

Location
- Athenry, County Galway; Ireland; 53.295570°N 8.751920°W

Information
- Religious affiliation: Roman Catholic
- Established: 1908
- Principal: Cathal Moore
- Chaplain: Benny McHale
- Enrollment: 1,107 (2022)
- Website: presathenry.ie

Presentation College, Athenry is a voluntary secondary school which is predominantly Catholic in character located in the town of Athenry, County Galway, Ireland. It is under the trusteeship of Catholic Education an Irish Schools Trust (CEIST).

== History ==
Presentation Convent in Athenry was established by the Tuam mother-house. Sisters taught in the old girls' primary school at Abbey Row until, some years later, a new primary school was built on the parish lands at the rear of the convent.

In the late 1920s, the Sisters began to provide secondary education for girls in the primary school through development of a secondary top.

In 1930, four girls took the Intermediate Certificate examination, fore-runner of the present Junior Certificate.

By the late 1940s, the school was registered with the Department of Education as a secondary school and the curriculum was extended. There were 74 girls on the rolls in 1949/50.

In 1964, the Sisters announced that boys would be admitted to the school from September, and 25 boys joined the 126 girls in the school which was now named Presentation College. In 1967 Raford School, near Kiltullagh, closed and its students came to Athenry that September.

By 1968, Sr. Brid Brennan had been appointed principal. With the advent of the Free Education Scheme and free transport in 1967 pupil numbers increased greatly. The co-educational Coolarne school also then amalgamated with Presentation College.

By 1970, there were 386 pupils enrolled, and were mainly taught in pre-fabricated classrooms.

During the 1980s, the present school building was completed on what had previously been the football pitch. A gymnasium was provided by local effort. The first lay Principal, Gilbert McCarthy, was appointed and served until his retirement in 2004.

On 14 February 2019, the doors to the founding school closed. Later in February 2019, Presentation College Athenry relocated to a new school on a greenfield site at Ballygurrane Athenry.

== Curriculum ==
The school offers both the Junior and Leaving Certificate cycles and a Transition Year programme.

Presentation College Athenry is involved in a variety of sports, including Gaelic football, camogie, hurling and soccer.

== Teachers ==
- Cathal Moore (b. 1975) - hurler

== Alumni ==
- Frank Burke (b. 1952) - hurler
- Elaine Feeney - poet, novelist, and playwright
- Eoin Lawless (b. 2002) - hurler
- Seán Loftus (b. 1997) - hurler
- Evan Niland (b. 1998) - hurler
