= St Kieran's College =

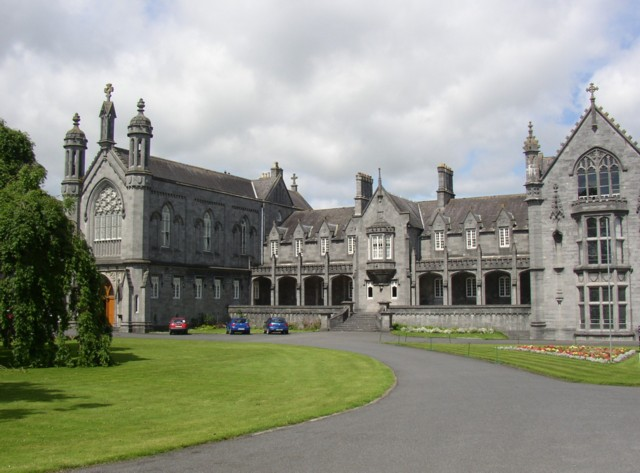

Location
- Kilkenny; Ireland; 52°38′49″N 07°15′20″W

Information
- Former name: Birchfield College
- Motto: Hiems Transiit (The Winter Has Passed)
- Religious affiliation: Roman Catholic
- Established: 1782; 244 years ago
- President: Rev. Dr. Dermot Ryan
- Principal: Adrian Finan
- Website: St Kieran's College

St Kieran's College (Coláiste Chiaráin) is a Roman Catholic secondary school, located on College Road, Kilkenny, Ireland.

== History ==
St Kieran's College was founded in Kilkenny, in the diocese of Ossory in 1782, after the passing of the Catholic Relief Act of 1782. This act enabled Catholics to found schools (with the consent of the Protestant bishop of the diocese) for the first time since the Irish penal laws were introduced. Prior to this only Protestants could found educational institutions. The college was founded as the diocesan school and was the first of its kind in the country. The school's motto is "Hiems Transiit", Latin for "The winter has passed", It is a metaphor for the repeal of the penal laws which had kept Catholics as second class citizens in Ireland. It is taken from chapter 3:17 verse 11 of the Song of Solomon book of the Bible:

"My beloved speaks and says to me: Arise, my love, my fair one, and come away; for lo, the winter is past, the rain is over and gone."

— RSV

The saint for whom the school was named was St Ciarán of Saigir, Apostle of Osraige, "first-born of the saints of Ireland" (Primogenitus Sanctorum Hiberniae). By the 1790s upheaval on the continent led to the demand for the provision of education for priests at home. In 1782 the college opened its doors to students of philosophy and theology, the first college in Ireland to do so. The first location of the college was at Burrell's Hall, James Street, Kilkenny, which is now the location of Saint Mary's Cathedral (the seat of the Bishop of Ossory) and the Irish Christian Brothers secondary school. It was later moved to the present location of the Loreto Convent Girls' Secondary School, Granges Road, Kilkenny.

In 1814, the Birchfield Estate was purchased for ecclesiastical students for St Kyran's College with the name Birchfield College also being used. The College was at Birchfield, St Patrick's civil parish, Barony of Shillelogher, until 1838 when the estate was bought by the Smithwick family. Between 1811 and 1845 a new permanent building was constructed on what is now College Road. Architect William Deane Butler, who also designed St Mary's Cathedral, was the architect; he was assisted by George Ashlin. The tower which rises from the centre of the cathedral was actually originally intended for the college. Some distinguishing features of the building include the Clock Tower, the Chapel and the Glass-Hall. The college chapel contains some stained glass windows designed by Harry Clarke which have recently undergone restoration. Fundraising has begun for maintenance and restoration work on the pipe organ in the College Chapel which dates from the 1800s.

== Seminary ==
As well as teaching lay students St Kieran's was a minor and major seminary. In 1793 courses in philosophy and theology were added, previously only humanities were taught. As it was located in Birchfield, Shillelogher, the seminary for a time was known as Birchfield College, and would have had a President and professors of philosophy and theology.

As a seminary, the College educated many priests who went on to be ordained to serve in Ireland and abroad (some 600 in the United States). Unlike Maynooth College St Kieran's was not supported by the British government financially.

During the 19th century following the example of St. Patrick's, Carlow College students were able to sit degree examinations for the University of London, where the name of the college was sometimes misspelled as St. Kyrans. In 1982 the College celebrated its bicentenary with over 200 priests from around the world attending. In 1994, with the approval of the authorities in the seminary and all the priests of the diocese, a decision was made by Bishop Forristal to close the seminary at St Kieran's after 212 years due to a dramatic fall in vocations to the priesthood.

== Present day education ==
The college had originally catered to seminarians and boarding students but eventually day students were allowed to attend. This led to the abolishment of a three day week class structure and the introduction of the five-days-a-week school time. In 2003 it ceased boarding students and became solely a day-student secondary school.

== Adult education ==
=== Adult faith formation ===
The College is the base for the diocesan adult religious education and faith formation office. This office works with parishes and diocesan groups to help facilitate education in the faith for people of the diocese. It is the office which publishes the diocesan magazine, Ossory Times. In association with the Catholic Diocese of Ossory, 2011 saw the commencement of a Certificate in Theological Studies (Level 7) accredited by St Patrick's College, Maynooth.

In 2014 the Diploma in Catholic Education (Level 8) for teachers in Catholic secondary schools was offered in the college, in conjunction with St Patrick's College, Maynooth, and the University of Notre Dame.

=== Kilkenny Campus - Maynooth University (1997–2018) ===
From 1997 to 2018 the Kilkenny Campus of Maynooth University, an outreach project of the university, was housed in the west wing of the original college buildings. Two modular and inter-disciplinary part-time degree programmes (in Local Studies and in Community Studies) were offered, as well as a range of undergraduate certificates. Postgraduate programmes for adult education practitioners were offered on a part-time basis.

Approximately 1,400 awards were made by the university to students who took their courses in Kilkenny between 1997 and 2012. In September 2013, the first full-time students registered at the campus for the First Year of their BA. This initiative offered students a chance to commence their studies locally, before transferring to the main campus in Maynooth for second and third year. St Patrick's College, Maynooth taught the Theology modules in St Kieran's as part of the university's BA programme, and could progress to a BA Th from Maynooth (Pontifical University).

From 2010 Maynooth University, Kilkenny Campus hosted the Certificate in Christian Studies for lay Anglicans, in association with the Church of Ireland Diocese of Cashel and Ossory, accredited by St. Patrick's College, Maynooth (Pontifical University).

Graduation ceremonies took place in Kilkenny Castle; in its initial years they took place in Maynooth.

Maynooth University closed the Kilkenny Campus at St Kieran's in June 2018.

=== ICT Research Centre ===
In February 2011 it was announced that a new ICT Research centre was to be established in St Kieran's, this is a partnership between Kilkenny County Council (Invest Kilkenny), Waterford Institute of Technology (Telecommunications Software and Systems Group) and the Institute of Technology, Carlow. it is on the campus in Burrell's Hall it was officially opened on 24 May 2012 by Taoiseach Enda Kenny.

== Extra services ==
St Kieran's College also provides services and class-room usage for the City Vocational School and Coláiste Pobail Osraí, the city's Irish-language medium secondary school.

=== Archives ===
The Carrigan Room contains all of the documents and pictures collected by William Carrigan for his four-volume encyclopaedia on the history of the diocese. The archives also contain documents collected by Carrigan for an intended second edition. These were never used for that purpose after Carrigan died during the 1918 flu pandemic. A collection of papers of Kilkenny families and businesses, including the Wandesforde papers, the Aylward papers, the Smithwick papers, the Swift Heath papers and the Catherine Lanigan papers, is also stored at the college.

==== Avonmore Cooperative Foundation ====
Glanbia Plc recently became the first commercial company in Kilkenny to recognise the value of Kilkenny Archives Ltd., to see a community value in what it does, when it passed all its old original Creamery Records to them for safekeeping as the Glanbia Collection.

Glanbia, one of the world’s top nutrition companies with revenues of over €3.5 billion and 5,815 employees, was originally formed by local farmers through the amalgamation of small rural co-operative Creamery societies from Kilkenny and some neighbouring counties, when together with Unigate Limited support they formed the Avonmore Creameries Federation. Realising the benefits of increased scale and greater diversification in the 1960s, they saw the need for an amalgamation of many small, locally focused co-operatives across Ireland. It led to the construction of a new multi-purpose Avonmore dairy plant facility in Ballyragget, County Kilkenny, and a Plant they claimed was the biggest food processing facility in Europe at that time. Today that giant global entity is known as Glanbia. Glanbia has its origins in the Irish agricultural co-operative movement that evolved over the last century since first Irish Co-operative in 1889, founded by Horace Plunkett. Today Glanbia has operations in 34 countries and is exporting to more than 100 countries worldwide.

Glanbia plc was formed in 1997 out of the merger of Avonmore Foods plc and Waterford Foods plc. Glanbia is ranked by revenue (2010 figures) in the top 100 Cooperatives, No 98 in the world and No 1 in Ireland by the International Co-operative Alliance, the global apex organisation of co-operatives worldwide. According to Glanbia Collections in Kilkenny Archives at St Kieran's College, Kilkenny, the Avonmore Coop brand was created through the merger of over 30 village creameries that are now included among their archives, and available for public viewing. Among the records lodged include the minute books and papers of Kilmanagh Co-operative Creamery, which is one of the oldest creameries in Kilkenny.

== Activities ==
St Kieran's is also famed as a hurling school. The college has won 26 All-Ireland Senior Colleges Finals (the greatest number by any school in the country); 55 Leinster Senior Colleges titles; 39 Leinster Junior titles; and 34 Leinster Juvenile titles. Other sports that the school partakes in are Gaelic handball, Gaelic football, soccer, basketball, equestrian trials and showjumping, chess, swimming, golf, tennis, and athletics with a growing reputation for cross-country running in recent years. On 7 May 2009, the U-16 soccer team won the All-Ireland for the first time in the school's history.

Other than sports, there are poetry workshops with a writer-in-residence, poet Mark Roper, who has helped compile poetry broadsheets and advised people on the way to being published. Musical and artistic studies are also part of the school curriculum. The school also has a film-editing suite, which was used to complete a feature-length film about the Great Famine. This project was undertaken as part of a Schools Integration Project in Kilkenny.

== School crest and motto ==
The motto of the school is "Hiems Transiit", Latin for "The Winter Has Passed". The school crest is the diocese's crest emblazoned on a Celtic cross. The coat of arms of the diocese has a representation of St Kieran between two pillars. It appears on Episcopal arms from the 18th century and on a beautiful book plate of Archbishop Troy as well as the college crest.

== People associated with the college ==
As a seminary, the college trained many priests for ministry in Ireland and abroad. Patrick Kelly, Bishop of Richmond, taught at Birchfield College, and also served as president. Thomas MacDonagh, an Easter Rising leader, was a teacher at the school (1901–03), as was the pacifist Francis Sheehy Skeffington (1900–01). Both men died in the aftermath of the Rising in 1916. John Wilson, former Tánaiste, was a teacher in the school (1957–60).

=== Past pupils ===
Notable students to have attended the school include:

- Rev Dr Patrick Collier, Bishop of Ossory
- Raymond Crotty, economist
- Diarmuid Cody, hurler
- Michael Egan, Irish-American politician
- Ralph Fiennes, actor
- Phil Hogan, former EU Commissioner for Agriculture.
- Thomas Kilroy, playwright who played hurling for the school team, captaining them in 1952
- Rev. Dr. Walter McDonald Professor of Dogmatic Theology, Maynooth, also taught at St. Kieran'.
- Patrick McKee, politician
- Tomm Moore, filmmaker and animator
- Patrick Neary, banker
- Dr Richard Phelan, Roman Catholic Diocese of Pittsburgh, Bishop of Pittsburgh
- Brendan Mulvey, former member of Cellar Door
- Father Peter Whelan, OSM, Army chaplain during the American Civil War
- Seán J. White, writer, academic, broadcaster and journalist
- Gavan Holohan, professional footballer
- Archbishop Thomas A. White, served as Apostolic Nuncio to Rwanda, Fiji and New Zealand.
- Bishop James Whyte of Dunedin, New Zealand
- Bishop William J. McDonald, American bishop and Rector of the Catholic University of America
- Mike Rice, Comedian
- Bishop Edward Walsh
- Several members of the bands Kerbdog and Engine Alley
