= List of Kilkenny minor hurling team captains =

This article lists players who have captained the Kilkenny minor hurling team in the Leinster Minor Hurling Championship and the All-Ireland Minor Hurling Championship. The captain is usually chosen from the club that has won the Kilkenny Minor Hurling Championship.

== List of captains ==
Year	Player	Club	National titles	Provincial titles
1970				
1971				
1972	Brian Cody	James Stephens	All-Ireland Hurling Final winning captain	Leinster Hurling Final winning captain
1973	Kevin Robinson	O'Loughlin Gaels	All-Ireland Hurling Final winning captain	Leinster Hurling Final winning captain
1974	John Marnell	Dicksboro		Leinster Hurling Final winning captain
1975	Harry Ryan	Clara	All-Ireland Hurling Final winning captain	Leinster Hurling Final winning captain
1976	Eddie Mahon	Erin's Own		Leinster Hurling Final winning captain
1977	Seán Fennelly	Ballyhale Shamrocks	All-Ireland Hurling Final winning captain	Leinster Hurling Final winning captain
1978	Pierce Phelan	St. Lachtain's		Leinster Hurling Final winning captain
1979	Seánie Tyrrell	O'Loughlin Gaels	All-Ireland Hurling Final winning captain	Leinster Hurling Final winning captain
1980				
1981	Eddie Kennedy	O'Loughlin Gaels	All-Ireland Hurling Final winning captain	Leinster Hurling Final winning captain
1982				
1983				
1984	Tommy Lennon	Bennettsbridge		Leinster Hurling Final winning captain
1985				
1986				
1987				
1988	Patsy Brophy	Erin's Own	All-Ireland Hurling Final winning captain	Leinster Hurling Final winning captain
1989	Michael Phelan	Fenians		
1990	James McDermott	Young Irelands	All-Ireland Hurling Final winning captain	Leinster Hurling Final winning captain
1991	Dan O'Neill	Dicksboro	All-Ireland Hurling Final winning captain	Leinster Hurling Final winning captain
1992	Brian McEvoy	James Stephens		Leinster Hurling Final winning captain
1993	Shane Doyle	James Stephens	All-Ireland Hurling Final winning captain	Leinster Hurling Final winning captain
1994	Michael O'Neill	Dunnamaggin		Leinster Hurling Final winning captain
1995	Michael Hoyne	Graigue-Ballycallan		Leinster Hurling Final winning captain
1996	Ramie Cahill	Dunnamaggin		Leinster Hurling Final winning captain
1997	Michael Hoyne	Graigue-Ballycallan		Leinster Hurling Final winning captain
1998	Paul Shefflin	Ballyhale Shamrocks		Leinster Hurling Final winning captain
1999	Canice Hickey	Dunnamaggin		Leinster Hurling Final winning captain
2000	Tommy Walsh	Tullaroan		
2001	Emmet Kavanagh	Emeralds		Leinster Hurling Final winning captain
2002	Michael Rice	Carrickshock	All-Ireland Hurling Final winning captain	Leinster Hurling Final winning captain
2003	Richie Power	Carrickshock	All-Ireland Hurling Final winning captain	Leinster Hurling Final winning captain
2004	Matthew Ruth	James Stephens		Leinster Hurling Final winning captain
2005				
2006	Colin McGrath	St. Martin's		Leinster Hurling Final winning captain
2007	Adrian Stapleton	Dicksboro		
2008	Thomas Breen	St. Martin's	All-Ireland Hurling Final winning captain	Leinster Hurling Final winning captain
2009	Canice Maher	St. Martin's		Leinster Hurling Final winning captain
2010	Cillian Buckley	Dicksboro	All-Ireland Hurling Final winning captain	Leinster Hurling Final winning captain
2011	Aaron Duggan	Dicksboro		
2012	Enda Morrissey	Bennettsbridge		
2013	James Tyrrell	James Stephens		Leinster Hurling Final winning captain
2014	Darragh Joyce	Rower-Inistioge	All-Ireland Hurling Final winning captain	Leinster Hurling Final winning captain
2015	Daniel O'Connor	O'Loughlin Gaels		Leinster Hurling Final winning captain
2016	Chris Kavanagh	Dicksboro		
2017	Adrian Mullen	Ballyhale Shamrocks		Leinster Hurling Final winning captain
2018	Conor Kelly	O'Loughlin Gaels		
2019	James Aylward	Mooncoin		
2020	Timmy Clifford	Dicksboro		Leinster Hurling Final winning captain
2021	Harry Shine	Dicksboro		Leinster Hurling Final winning captain
2022	Tom McPhillips	Dicksboro		
