= 1980 Croke Cup =

Irish hurling competition

- Dates: 30 March - 27 April 1980
- Teams: 3
- Champions: North Monastery (3rd title); Jim Murray (captain)
- Runners-up: St Brendan's Community School; Paddy Corrigan (captain)

Tournament statistics
- Matches played: 3
- Goals scored: 14 (4.67 per match)
- Points scored: 48 (16 per match)
- Top scorer(s): Aidan Rosney (1-13)

The 1980 Croke Cup was the 29th staging of the Croke Cup since its establishment by the Gaelic Athletic Association in 1944. The competition ran from 30 March to 27 April 1980.

St Flannan's College were the defending champions, however, they were beaten by St Colman's College in the Harty Cup semi-final.

The final was played on 27 April 1980 at Semple Stadium in Thurles, between the North Monastery and St Brendan's Community School, in what was their first ever meeting in the final. The North Monastery won the match by 5–11 to 3–07 to claim their third Croke Cup title overall and a first title in 10 years.

Aidan Rosney was the top scorer with 1-13.

== Qualification ==
| Province | Champions |
|---|---|
| Connacht | St Joseph's College |
| Leinster | St Brendan's Community School |
| Munster | North Monastery |

== Results ==
=== Semi-final ===
| 30 March 1980 Semi-final | St Brendan's Community School | 0-07 - 1-04 | St Joseph's College | St Cronan's Park |
| | A Rosney 0-4, J Dooley 0-1, J Carroll 0-1, K Hogan 0-1. | | J Campbell 1-0, S Ruane 0-2, M Neville 0-1, N Kelly 0-1. | Referee: N O'Donoghue (Dublin) |

| 6 April 1980 Semi-final replay | St Brendan's Community School | 2-15 - 3-04 | St Joseph's College | Semple Stadium |
| | J Dooley 2-1, A Rosney 0-5, P Corrigan 0-4, G O'Meara 0-3, J Carroll 0-1, K Kinsella 0-1. | | J Campbell 2-0, H Blehean 1-0, L Jennings 0-1, S Ruane 0-1, O Kilkenny 0-1, N Kelly 0-1. | Referee: N O'Donoghue (Dublin) |

=== Final ===
| 27 April 1980 Final | North Monastery | 5-11 - 3-07 | St Brendan's Community School | Semple Stadium |
| | T O'Sullivan 2-8, T Mulcahy 2-0, M Lyons 1-0, R Allen 0-1, J Drinan 0-1, L Coffey 0-1. | | A Rosney 1-4, P Corrigan 1-2, K Kinsella 1-1. | Referee: J Moloney (Tipperary) |

== Statistics ==
=== Top scorers ===
Overall

| Rank | Player | County | Tally | Total | Matches | Average |
|---|---|---|---|---|---|---|
| 1 | Aidan Rosney | St Brendan's CS | 1-13 | 16 | 3 | 5.33 |
| 2 | Tony O'Sullivan | North Monastery | 2-08 | 14 | 1 | 14.00 |
| 3 | Joe Campbell | St Joseph's College | 3-00 | 9 | 2 | 4.50 |
| 3 | Paddy Corrigan | St Brendan's CS | 1-06 | 9 | 3 | 3.00 |
| 5 | Joe Dooley | St Brendan's CS | 2-02 | 8 | 3 | 2.66 |
