= Damien Geoghegan =

Irish hurler

Personal information
- Native name: Damien Mag Eochagáin (Irish)
- Born: 1969 (age 56–57) Birr, County Offaly, Ireland
- Occupation: Maintenance officer

Sport
- Sport: Hurling
- Position: Right corner-back
Club
- Years: Club
- Birr
Club titles
- Offaly titles: 1
- Leinster titles: 1
- All-Ireland Titles: 0
Inter-county
| Years | County | Apps (scores) |
| 1987-1991 | Offaly | 0 (0-00) |
Inter-county titles
- Leinster titles: 0
- All-Irelands: 0
- NHL: 0
- All Stars: 0

Damien Geoghegan (born 1969) is an Irish former hurler. At club level, he played with Birr and at inter-county level with the Offaly senior hurling team.

== Career ==
Geoghegan attended St Brendan's Community School in Birr and played in all grades of hurling during his time there. He won consecutive Leinster Colleges SHC titles and was part of the team that beat the North Monastery by 5–08 to 1–08 to win the Dr Croke Cup in 1986.

At club level, Geoghegan first played for Birr at juvenile and underage levels and won three Offaly MAHC medal. He progressed to adult level and won an Offaly SHC medal in 1991. This was subsequently converted into a Leinster Club SHC titles, however, Birr were later beaten by Kiltormer in the 1992 All-Ireland Club SHC final.

Geoghegan first played for Offaly as part of the minor team that won back-to-back All-Ireland MHC titles in 1986 and 1987. He later progressed to the under-21 team and won a Leinster U21HC medal in 1989. Geoghegan made his senior team debut in a National Hurling League game against Roscommon in November 1987.

== Honours ==
St Brendan's Community School

- All-Ireland Colleges Senior Hurling Championship (1): 1986
- Leinster Colleges Senior Hurling Championship (2): 1985, 1986

Birr

- Leinster Senior Club Hurling Championship (1): 1991
- Offaly Senior Hurling Championship (1): 1991

Offaly

- Leinster Under-21 Hurling Championship (1): 1989
- All-Ireland Minor Hurling Championship (2): 1986, 1987
- Leinster Minor Hurling Championship (2): 1986, 1987
