= John Power (Carrickshock hurler) =

Irish hurler

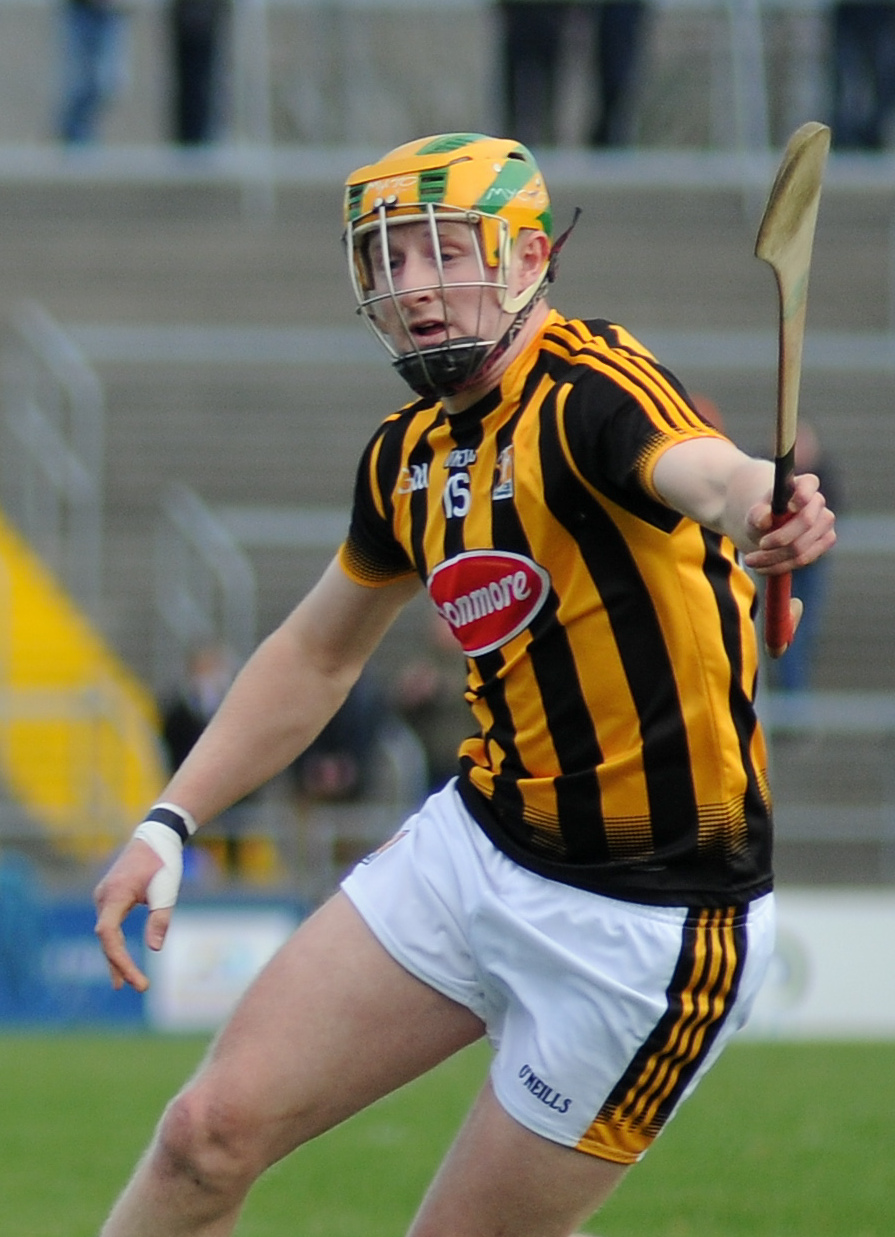
- Power playing for Kilkenny in 2015

Personal information
- Native name: Seán de Paor (Irish)
- Born: 26 August 1992 (age 34) Carrickshock, County Kilkenny, Ireland
- Occupation: Student
- Height: 6 ft 2 in (188 cm)

Sport
- Sport: Hurling
- Position: Full-forward
Club
- Years: Club
- Carrickshock
Club titles
- Kilkenny titles: 0
Inter-county*
Years	County	Apps (scores)
2013-2017	Kilkenny	7 (1-4)
Inter-county titles
- Leinster titles: 3
- All-Irelands: 2
- NHL: 0
- All Stars: 0
- *Inter County team apps and scores correct as of 21:07, 15 September 2015.

John Power (born 26 August 1992) is an Irish hurler who played as a left corner-forward for the Kilkenny senior team.

Born in Carrickshock, County Kilkenny, Power first played competitive hurling during his schooling at St. Kieran's College. He arrived on the inter-county scene at the age of sixteen when he first linked up with the Kilkenny minor team before later joining the under-21 side. He made his senior debut during the 2014 championship. Since then he has become a regular member of the team and has won two All-Ireland medals and two Leinster medals.

At club level Power plays with Carrickshock.

His father, Richie Power Snr, and his brother, Richie Power Jnr, are also All-Ireland medallists with Kilkenny.

== Playing career ==
=== Colleges ===
During his schooling at St. Kieran's College in Kilkenny, Power established himself as a key member of the senior hurling team. In 2010 he won his first Leinster medal following a 3–13 to 1–11 defeat of Dublin Colleges. On 3 April 2010 St. Kieran's faced Ardscoil Rís in the All-Ireland decider. Power's side trailed by five points as the game entered the final quarter, however, St. Kieran's staged a magnificent comeback, hitting 1-5 without reply including a Michael Brennan goal in the 51st minute, to claim a 2–11 to 2–8 victory. It was Power's first All-Ireland medal.

Power added a second successive Leinster medal to his collection in 2011, as St. Kieran's recorded a 3–7 to 0–7 victory over Castlecomer Community School. On 2 April 2011 St. Kieran's renewed their rivalry with Ardscoil Rís in the All-Ireland final. A Thomas O'Hanrahan goal deep into stoppage time secured a 2–10 to 1–11 victory for St. Kieran's and a second All-Ireland medal for Power.

=== Minor and under-21 ===
Power first played for Kilkenny in 2009 when he joined the minor side. He won his first Leinster medal that year following Kilkenny's 1–19 to 0-11 trouncing of Wexford in the provincial decider. Galway provided the opposition in the subsequent All-Ireland decider on 5 September 2010. A devastating second quarter display was pivotal in powering the Westerners to a 2–15 to 2–11 victory.

In 2010 Power won a second Leinster medal following a 1–20 to 0-10 trouncing of Dublin. The subsequent All-Ireland decider on 4 September 2011 pitted Kilkenny against Clare. "The Cats" were made to work hard before securing a narrow 2–10 to 0–14 victory, giving Power an All-Ireland Minor Hurling Championship medal.

Two years later Power was a key member of the Kilkenny under-21 team. He won his sole Leinster medal that year following a 4–24 to 1-13 trouncing of Laois. Kilkenny later faced Clare in the All-Ireland decider on 15 September 2012. A powerful second-half display, in which they outscored Kilkenny by 1–10 to 0–4, saw Clare take their second ever All-Ireland title in the grade.

=== Senior ===
In 2014 Power established himself on the senior team. He subsequently collected his first National Hurling League medal, as Kilkenny secured a narrow one-point 2–25 to 1-27 extra-time victory over Tipperary. He subsequently secured a Leinster medal, as a dominant Kilkenny display gave "the Cats" a 0–24 to 1–9 defeat of Dublin. On 7 September 2014 Power was on the bench as Kilkenny drew with Tipperary in the All-Ireland decider. He was added to the starting fifteen for the subsequent replay on 27 September 2014. Goals from Power and his brother Richie inspired Kilkenny to a 2–17 to 2–14 victory. It was his first All-Ireland medal.

Power won a second successive Leinster medal in 2015 following a 1–25 to 2–15 defeat of Galway in the provincial decider. He was listed as a substitute when Kilkenny renewed their rivalry with Galway in the All-Ireland decider on 6 September 2015. The team struggled in the first half, however, a T. J. Reid goal and a dominant second half display, which limited Galway to just 1–4, saw Kilkenny power to a 1–22 to 1–18 victory. Power was introduced as a substitute for Ger Aylward and collected his second All-Ireland medal on the field of play.

== Career statistics ==
Team	Year	National League			Championship		Total	
Team	Year	Division	Apps	Score	Apps	Score	Apps	Score
Kilkenny	2014	Division 1A	3	2-01	3	1-02	6	3-03
Kilkenny	2015	Division 1A	4	0-03	4	0-02	8	0-05
Kilkenny	2016	Division 1A	5	1-05	3	0-01	8	1-06
Kilkenny	2017	Division 1A	0	0-00	0	0-00	0	0-00
Total			12	3-09	10	1-05	22	4-14

== Honours ==
=== Team ===
St. Kieran's College

- All-Ireland Colleges Senior Hurling Championship (2): 2010, 2011
- Leinster Colleges Senior Hurling Championship (2): 2010, 2011

Kilkenny

- All-Ireland Senior Hurling Championship (2): 2014, 2015
- Leinster Senior Hurling Championship (3): 2014, 2015, 2016
- Leinster Under-21 Hurling Championship (1): 2012
- All-Ireland Minor Hurling Championship (1): 2010
- Leinster Minor Hurling Championship (1): 2009, 2010

Carrickshock Club Intermediate County champions 2016 Leinster Intermediate Club champions 2016 All Ireland Intermediate Club Champions 2016 Senior Hurling Shield 2017
