= Enda Morrissey =

Irish hurler (born 1994)

Personal information
- Native name: Éanna Ó Muireasa (Irish)
- Born: 22 February 1994 (age 32) Bennettsbridge, County Kilkenny, Ireland
- Occupation: Primary school teacher
- Height: 6 ft 0 in (183 cm)

Sport
- Sport: Hurling
- Position: Right wing-back
Club
- Years: Club
- Bennettsbridge
Club titles
- Kilkenny titles: 0
College
- Years: College
- St. Patrick's College
College titles
- Fitzgibbon titles: 0
Inter-county*
Years	County	Apps (scores)
2018-present	Kilkenny	8 (0-02)
Inter-county titles
- Leinster titles: 0
- All-Irelands: 0
- NHL: 1
- All Stars: 0
- *Inter County team apps and scores correct as of 12:50, 30 July 2019.

Enda Morrissey (born 22 February 1994) is an Irish hurler who plays for Kilkenny Senior Championship club Bennettsbridge and at inter-county level with the Kilkenny senior hurling team. He usually lines out as a right wing-back.

== Playing career ==
=== St. Kieran's College ===
Morrissey first came to prominence as a hurler with St. Kieran's College in Kilkenny. Having played in every grade as a hurler, he was eventually called up the college's senior team. On 2 March 2011, Morrissey won a Leinster Championship after lining out at left wing-back when St. Kieran's College defeated Castlecomer Community School by 3–07 to 0-07. He was switched to left corner-back for the All-Ireland final against Ardscoil Rís on 2 April 2011 and ended the game with a winners' medal after the 2–11 to 2–08 victory.

On 3 March 2012, Morrissey won a second successive Leinster Championship medal with St. Kieran's College following a 2–09 to 1–10 defeat of nearby rivals Kilkenny CBS in the final.

=== St. Patrick's College ===
As a student at St. Patrick's College in Dublin, Morrissey immediately became involved in hurling. He lined out with the college's senior hurling team in several Fitzgibbon Cup campaigns.

=== Bennettsbridge ===
Morrissey joined the Bennettsbridge club at a young age and played in all grades at juvenile and underage levels and enjoyed championship success in the minor grade. He eventually joined the club's top adult team in the Kilkenny Junior Championship.

On 4 November 2012, Morrissey was just out of the minor grade when he lined out at midfield when Bennettsbridge qualified for the Kilkenny Junior Championship final. He ended on the losing side following a 3–12 to 0–10 defeat by Thomastown.

Bennettsbridge qualified for a second successive Kilkenny Junior Championship final on 20 October 2013, with Morrissey lining out at centre-back. For the second year in succession he ended the game on the losing team after a 2–16 to 1–18 defeat by Lisdowney.

On 9 November 2014, Morrissey won a Kilkenny Junior Championship medal after lining out at centre-back in a 1–17 to 1–07 defeat of Mooncoin in the final. He retained his position at centre-back for the Leinster final on 6 December 2014 and ended the game with a winners' medal after the 1–20 to 0–03 defeat of Shamrocks. Bennettsbridge subsequently qualified for an All-Ireland final meeting with Fullen Gaels on 15 February 2015. Morrissey collected a winners' medal after again lining out at centre-back in the 2–17 to 2–14 victory.

Morrissey was appointed captain of the Bennettsbridge team for the 2015 season. On 18 October 2015, he captained the team when Bennettsbridge drew 0–20 to 3–11 with St Patrick's Ballyragget in the Kilkenny Intermediate Championship final. He again captained the team for the replay on 24 October 2015 and collected a winners' medal after a 1–16 to 1–14 victory. Morrissey won a Leinster Championship medal on 21 November 2015 after lining out at right corner-back in a 1–14 to 0–13 defeat of Kiltale in the final. On 7 February 2016, he was back to his usual position of centre-back for the All-Ireland final against Abbeyknockmoy. He ended the game with a winners' medal following the 1–17 to 1–14 victory.

=== Kilkenny ===
==== Minor and under-21 ====
Morrissey first played for Kilkenny as a member of the minor team during the 2011 Leinster Championship. On 3 July 2011, lined out at left corner-back in Kilkenny's 1–14 to 1–11 defeat by Dublin in the Leinster final.

Morrissey was again eligible for the minor team in 2012. He made his last appearance for the team on 23 June 2012 when he lined out at centre-back in a 1–12 to 0–10 defeat by Dublin in the semi-final.

Morrissey was drafted onto the Kilkenny under-21 team in advance of the 2014 Leinster Championship. He made his first appearance in the grade on 4 June 2014 when he lined out at left wing-back in a 2–14 to 0–10 defeat by Wexford.

On 8 July 2015, Morrissey lined out at centre-back when Kilkenny suffered a 4–17 to 1–09 defeat by Wexford in the Leinster final. It was his last game with the Kilkenny under-21 team.

==== Senior ====
Morrissey joined the Kilkenny senior team in advance of the 2018 National League. He made his first appearance for the team on 27 January 2018 when he came on as a 65th-minute substitute for Cillian Buckley at left wing-back in a 1–24 to 0–24 defeat by Cork. On 8 April 2018, Morrissey lined out at left wing-back when Kilkenny faced Tipperary in the National League final. He ended the game with a winners' medal following the 2–23 to 2–17 victory. On 1 July 2018, Morrisey scored a point from left wing-back when Kilkenny drew 0-18 apiece with Galway in the Leinster final. He retained his position on the starting fifteen for the replay a week later, which Kilkenny lost by 1–28 to 3–15.

On 30 June 2019, Morrissey lined out at right wing-back when Kilkenny suffered a 1–23 to 0–23 defeat by Wexford in the Leinster final.

== Career statistics ==
As of match played 27 July 2019.

Team	Year	National League			Leinster		All-Ireland		Total	
Team	Year	Division	Apps	Score	Apps	Score	Apps	Score	Apps	Score
Kilkenny	2018	Division 1A	8	0-01	5	0-02	0	0-00	13	0-03
Kilkenny	2019	Division 1A	4	0-00	3	0-00	0	0-00	7	0-00
Career total			12	0-01	8	0-02	0	0-00	20	0-03

== Honours ==
St. Kieran's College

- All-Ireland Colleges Senior Hurling Championship (1): 2011
- Leinster Colleges Senior Hurling Championship (2): 2011, 2012

Bennettsbridge

- All-Ireland Intermediate Club Hurling Championship (1): 2016 (c)
- Leinster Intermediate Club Hurling Championship (1): 2015 (c)
- Kilkenny Intermediate Hurling Championship (1): 2015 (c)
- All-Ireland Junior Club Hurling Championship (1): 2015
- Leinster Junior Club Hurling Championship (1): 2014
- Kilkenny Junior Hurling Championship (1): 2014

Kilkenny

- National Hurling League (1): 2018
