= Tommy Lennon =

Irish hurler

Personal information
- Native name: Tomás Ó Leannáin (Irish)
- Born: 24 September 1966 (age 60) Bennettsbridge, County Kilkenny, Ireland
- Occupation: Plumber
- Height: 5 ft 11 in (180 cm)

Sport
- Sport: Hurling
- Position: Left corner-forward
Club
- Years: Club
- Bennettsbridge
Club titles
- Cork titles: 0
Inter-county
- Years: County
- 1986–1988: Kilkenny
Inter-county titles
- Munster titles: 1
- All-Irelands: 0
- NHL: 0
- All Stars: 0

Thomas Lennon (born 24 September 1966) is an Irish retired hurler who played for Kilkenny Championship club Bennettsbridge. He played for the Kilkenny senior hurling team for a brief period, during which time he usually lined out as a right corner-forward

== Playing career ==
Lennon was raised just outside Bennettsbridge, County Kilkenny and educated at Gowran National School. He later attended St Kieran's College in Kilkenny and was part of the college's senior hurling team that was beaten by Kilkenny CBS in a Leinster Colleges SAHC final. Lennon was lucky to ever play the game, following an accident in his childhood resulting in his foot nearly having to be amputated.

At club level, Lennon began his career at juvenile and underage levels with Bennettsbridge. He won a Kilkenny MHC title in 1983, before claiming a Kilkenny U21HC medal two years later in 1985. Lennon later lined out at adult level with the club. He first played for Kilkenny as captain of the minor team beaten by Limerick in the 1984 All-Ireland MHC final. Lennon immediately progressed to the under-21 team and was part of the team beaten by Tipperary in the All-Ireland U21HC final.

Lennon won an All-Ireland JHC medal in 1986, following a 1–17 to 0–15 win over Limerick in the final. He was immediately promoted to the senior team on the back of this success. Lennon won a Leinster SHC medal in his debut season, however, Kilkenny were later beaten by Galway in the 1987 All-Ireland SHC final.

== Coaching career ==
Lennon has also served as a selector at all levels with Bennettsbridge.

== Honours ==
Bennettsbridge

- Kilkenny Under-21 Hurling Championship (1): 1985
- Kilkenny Minor Hurling Championship (1): 1983

Kilkenny

- Leinster Senior Hurling Championship (1): 1987
- All-Ireland Junior Hurling Championship (1): 1986
- Leinster Junior Hurling Championship (1): 1986
- Leinster Under-21 Hurling Championship (1): 1985
- Leinster Minor Hurling Championship (1): 1984 (c)
