= Thomas Breen (hurler) =

Irish hurler

Personal information
- Native name: Tomás Ó Braoin (Irish)
- Born: 24 July 1990 (age 36) Muckalee, County Kilkenny, Ireland
- Height: 6 ft 0 in (183 cm)

Sport
- Sport: Hurling
- Position: Full-forward
Club
- Years: Club
- St Martin's
Club titles
- Kilkenny titles: 0
College
- Years: College
- St Patrick's College
College titles
- Fitzgibbon titles: 0
Inter-county*
| Years | County | Apps (scores) |
| 2013-2014 | Kilkenny | 0 (0-00) |
Inter-county titles
- Leinster titles: 0
- All-Irelands: 0
- NHL: 1
- All Stars: 0
- *Inter County team apps and scores correct as of 21:05, 23 March 2022.

Thomas Breen (born 24 July 1990) is an Irish hurler who plays for Kilkenny IHC club St Martin's. He previously lined out at inter-county level with the Kilkenny senior hurling team.

== Career ==
Breen played with the Castlecomer Community School hurling team that won the Leinster Colleges Championship in 2007. He simultaneously lined out with the St Martin's club at juvenile and underage levels before eventually progressing onto the club's senior team. Breen first appeared on the inter-county scene as captain of the Kilkenny minor hurling team that beat Galway in the 2008 All-Ireland minor final. After an unsuccessful tenure with the under-21 team, he was drafted onto the Kilkenny senior hurling team in 2013. Breen shared in the team's National Hurling League success in his debut season before claiming Walsh Cup honours in 2014.

== Career statistics ==
| Team | Year | National League | | | Leinster | | All-Ireland | | Total | |
| Team | Year | Division | Apps | Score | Apps | Score | Apps | Score | Apps | Score |
|---|---|---|---|---|---|---|---|---|---|---|
| Kilkenny | 2013 | Division 1A | 2 | 0-00 | 0 | 0-00 | 0 | 0-00 | 2 | 0-00 |
| Kilkenny | 2014 | Division 1A | — | | — | | — | | — | |
| Total | | | 2 | 0-00 | 0 | 0-00 | 0 | 0-00 | 2 | 0-00 |

== Honours ==
Castlecomer Community School

- Leinster Colleges Senior Hurling Championship: 2007

Kilkenny

- National Hurling League: 2013
- Walsh Cup: 2014
- All-Ireland Minor Hurling Championship: 2008
- Leinster Minor Hurling Championship: 2008

Sporting positions
| Preceded by Adrian Stapleton | Kilkenny minor hurling team captain 2008 | Succeeded by Canice Maher |
Achievements
| Preceded by Brendan Maher | All-Ireland Minor Hurling Final winning captain 2008 | Succeeded by Richie Cummins |
