= Kevin Robinson =

Kevin Robinson may refer to:

- Kevin Robinson (gridiron football) (born 1984), wide receiver
- Kevin Robinson (hurler) (born 1955), Irish hurler
- Kevin Robinson (BMX rider) (1971–2017), American BMX rider
- K. J. Robinson (born 1998), American basketball player
