= Michael Carey =

Michael or Mike Carey may refer to:

== Sportspeople ==
- Mike Carey (American football) (born 1949), retired American football official in the National Football League
- Mike Carey (basketball) (born 1958), head women's basketball coach for West Virginia University
- Michael Carey (basketball), Bahamian basketball player
- Michael Carey (hurler), Irish hurler

== Others ==
- Mike Carey (writer) (born 1959), British writer of comic books, novels, and films
- Michael Carey (priest) (1913–1985), Anglican Archdeacon of Ely and Dean of Ely
- Michael Carey (United States Air Force officer), major general in the United States Air Force
- Michael J. Carey (computer scientist), American computer scientist
- Mike Carey (politician), politician and coal lobbyist in Ohio
- Mike Carey (broadcaster) (1936–2023), British BBC broadcaster, author and cricket correspondent
