= Brian Hennessy =

Irish hurler (born 1969)

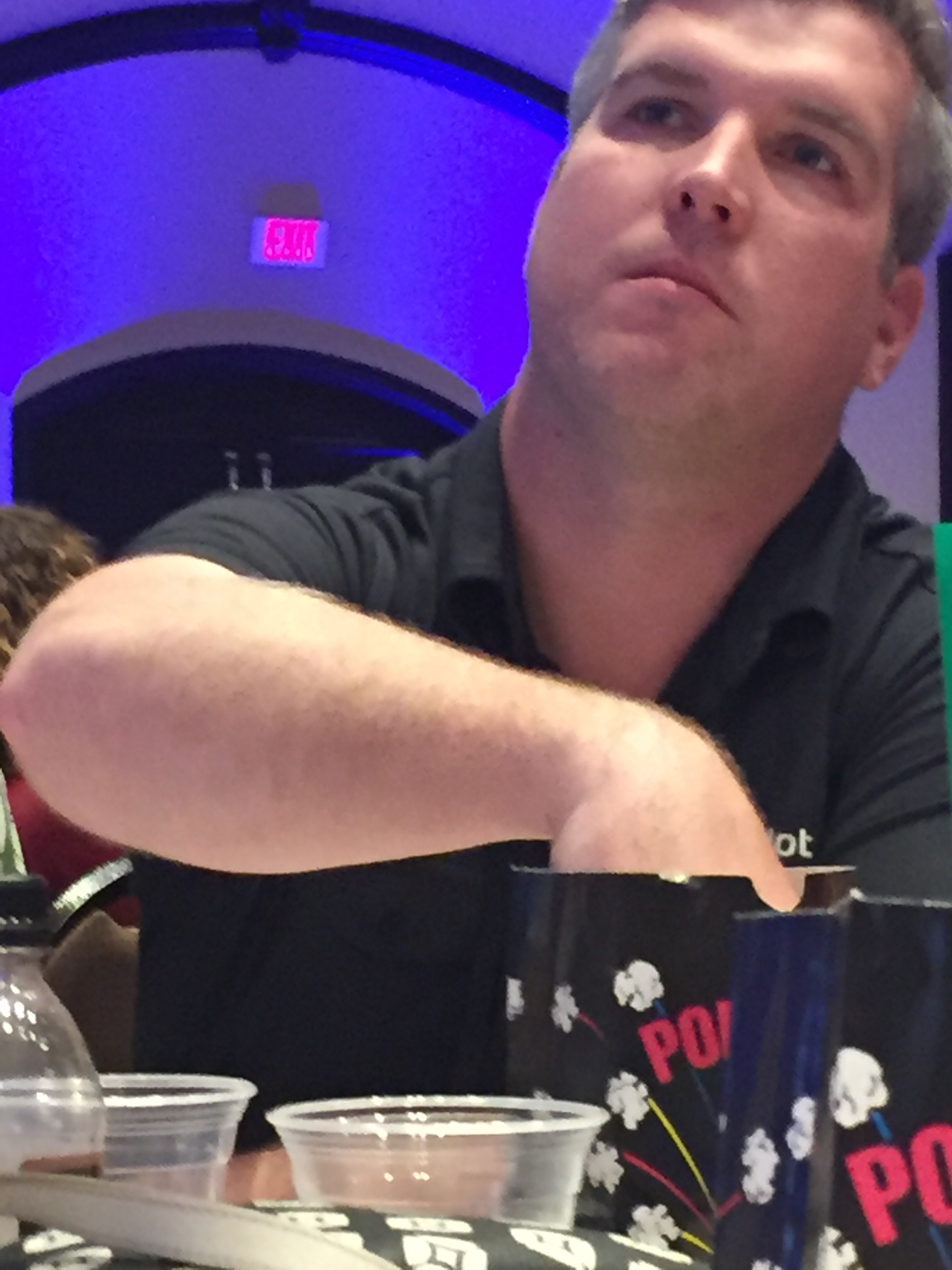

Personal information
- Native name: Briain Ó hAonasa (Irish)
- Born: 29 August 1969 (age 57) Birr, County Offaly, Ireland

Sport
- Sport: Hurling
- Position: Right corner-back
Club
- Years: Club
- Birr
Club titles
- Offaly titles: 5
- Leinster titles: 4
- All-Ireland Titles: 2
Inter-county*
Years	County	Apps (scores)
1990-1995	Offaly	2 (0-00)
Inter-county titles
- Leinster titles: 0
- All-Irelands: 0
- NHL: 1
- All Stars: 0
- *Inter County team apps and scores correct as of 11:41, 30 June 2014.

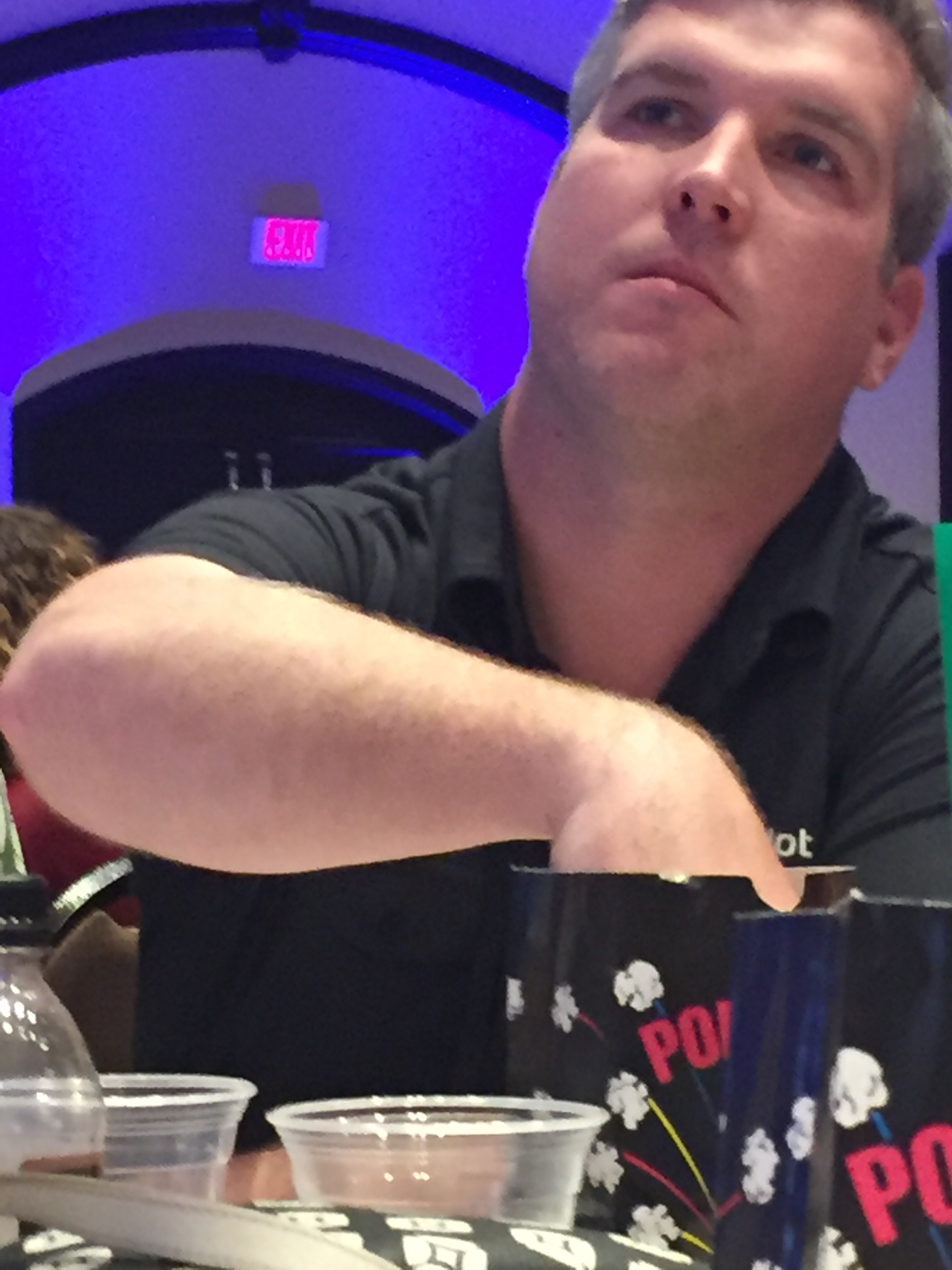
Brian Hennessy in Hoboken, New Jersey in 2017

Brian Hennessy (born 29 August 1969) is an Irish retired hurler who played as a right corner-back for the Offaly senior team.

Born in Birr, County Offaly, Hennessy first played competitive hurling in his youth. He first came to prominence on the inter-county scene when he first linked up with the Offaly minor team, before later joining the under-21 side. He made his senior debut during the 1990-91 National League and immediately became a regular member of the team. During his career he won a National Hurling League medal on the field of play.

At club level Hennessy is a one-time All-Ireland medallist with Birr. In addition to this he also won four Leinster medals and five championship medals.

His retirement came following the conclusion of the 1995 championship.

== Honours ==
=== Team ===
Birr

- All-Ireland Senior Club Hurling Championship (2): 1995, 1998 (sub)
- Leinster Senior Club Hurling Championship (4): 1991, 1994, 1997, 1999
- Offaly Senior Club Hurling Championship (5): 1991, 1994, 1997, 1999, 2000

Offaly

- All-Ireland Senior Hurling Championship (1): 1994
- Leinster Senior Hurling Championship (2): 1994, 1995
- National Hurling League (1): 1990-91
- Leinster Under-21 Hurling Championship (1): 1989
- All-Ireland Minor Hurling Championship (1): 1987
- Leinster Minor Hurling Championship (1): 1987
