= 2011 Croke Cup =

Irish hurling competition

- Dates: 12 March - 2 April 2011
- Teams: 5
- Champions: St Kieran's College (18th title); William Phelan (captain)
- Runners-up: Ardscoil Rís; Declan Hannon (captain); Shane Dowling (captain)

Tournament statistics
- Matches played: 4
- Goals scored: 10 (2.5 per match)
- Points scored: 80 (20 per match)
- Top scorer(s): Tom O'Hanrahan (4-04)

The 2011 Croke Cup was the 60th staging of the Croke Cup since its establishment by the Gaelic Athletic Association in 1944. The competition ran from 12 March to 2 April 2011.

St Kieran's College were the defending champions.

The final was played on 2 April 2011 at Semple Stadium in Thurles, between St Kieran's College and Ardscoil Rís, in what was their second consecutive meeting in the final. St Kieran's College won the match by 2–10 to 1–11 to claim their 18th Croke Cup title overall and a second successive title.

Thomas O'Hanrahan was the top scorer with 4-04.

== Results ==
=== Quarter-final ===
12 March 2011 Quarter-final	Charleville CBS	1-11 - 0-11	Presentation College, Athenry	O'Garney Park
	P O'Callaghan 1-4, J O'Brien 0-3, M Kavanagh 0-3, G Kelleher 0-1.		C Keane 0-6, M Mullins 0-5.	Referee: G O'Mahony (Limerick)

=== Semi-finals ===
19 March 2011 Semi-final	St Kieran's College	3-10 - 0-07	Charleville CBS	Seán Treacy Park
	T O'Hanrahan 2-2, J Power 1-3 (3f), M Donnelly 0-2 (1f), J Nolan, M Brennan, H O'Neill 0-1 each.	Report	J Morrissey, D Reidy (1f, 1 '65') each, M Kavanagh (f), D Copps, P O'Callaghan 0-1 each.	Referee: P Casey (Waterford)

19 March 2011 Semi-final	Ardscoil Rís	2-16 - 0-06	Castlecomer Community School	Páirc Shíleáin
	S Dowling (0-8, 0-6 frees); B O’Connor, O Hickey (1-2 each); M Carmody (0-2); J Kelliher, C Lynch (0-1 each).	Report	C Dwyer (0-4, 0-2 frees); E Bergin, L Maher (0-1 each).	Referee: J Ryan (Tipperary)

=== Final ===
2 April 2011 Final	St Kieran's College	2-11 - 2-08	Ardscoil Rís	Semple Stadium
	T O’Hanrahan 2-2, J Power 0-4 (1f), M Brennan 0-2, W Phelan (f) & R Reid 0-1 each.		S Dowling 0-6 (5f, 1 ’65), O Hickey 1-1, A Dempsey, D Hannon (f), M Carmody, J Fitzgibbon 0-1 each.	Referee: D Kirwan (Cork)

== Statistics ==
=== Top scorers ===
Overall

Rank	Player	County	Tally	Total	Matches	Average
1	Thomas O'Hanrahan	St Kieran's College	4-04	16	2	8.00
2	Shane Dowling	Ardscoil Rís	0-14	14	2	7.00
3	John Power	St Kieran's College	1-07	10	2	5.00
4	Oisín Hickey	Ardscoil Rís	2-03	9	2	3.50
5	Pa O'Callaghan	Charleville CBS	1-05	8	2	4.00
