= Timmy Clifford =

Irish hurler

Personal information
- Native name: Tadhg Ó Clúmháin (Irish)
- Born: 28 November 2003 (age 22) Kilkenny, Ireland
- Occupation: Student
- Height: 5 ft 11 in (180 cm)

Sport
- Sport: Hurling
- Position: Centre-forward
Club
- Years: Club
- Dicksboro
Club titles
- Kilkenny titles: 0
Inter-county*
Years	County	Apps (scores)
2023-	Kilkenny	0 (0-00)
Inter-county titles
- Leinster titles: 1
- All-Irelands: 0
- NHL: 0
- All Stars: 0
- *Inter County team apps and scores correct as of 22:25, 25 March 2023.

Timmy Clifford (born 28 November 2003) is an Irish hurler. At club level he plays with Dicksboro and at inter-county level with the Kilkenny senior hurling team.

== Career ==
Clifford first played hurling as a schoolboy at CBS Kilkenny. He simultaneously progressed through the various underage grades with the Dicksboro club, winning consecutive Kilkenny MHC titles in 2019 and 2020 and a Kilkenny U19HC title in 2022. Clifford made his senior team debut in 2021.

Clifford first appeared on the inter-county scene as a member of the Kilkenny minor hurling team that lost the 2019 All-Ireland minor final to Galway. He was again eligible for the minor grade the following year and captained the team to a second consecutive defeat by Galway in the 2020 All-Ireland minor final to Galway. Clifford immediately progressed to the under-20 team and was at centre-forward when Kilkenny beat Limerick in the 2022 All-Ireland under-20 final.

Clifford first played for the senior team during the 2023 Walsh Cup.

== Honours ==
Dicksboro

- Kilkenny Under-19 Hurling Championship: 2022
- Kilkenny Minor Hurling Championship: 2019, 2020

Kilkenny

- All-Ireland Under-20 Hurling Championship: 2022
- Leinster Under-20 Hurling Championship: 2022
- Leinster Minor Hurling Championship: 2020 (c), 2019

Sporting positions
Preceded by James Aylward	Kilkenny minor hurling team captain 2020	Succeeded by Harry Shine
