= Michael Carey (hurler) =

Irish hurler from Kilkenny

Personal information
- Native name: Mícheál Ó Ciardha (Irish)
- Born: 30 March 1999 (age 27) Gowran, County Kilkenny, Ireland
- Occupation: Secondary school teacher
- Height: 6 ft 2 in (188 cm)

Sport
- Sport: Hurling
- Position: Left wing-back
Club
- Years: Club
- Young Irelands
Club titles
- Kilkenny titles: 0
College
- Years: College
- University of Limerick
College titles
- Fitzgibbon titles: 0
Inter-county
- Years: County
- 2019-: Kilkenny
Inter-county titles
- Leinster titles: 3
- All-Irelands: 0
- NHL: 1
- All Stars: 0

Michael Carey (born 30 March 1999) is an Irish hurler who plays for Kilkenny intermediate Championship club Young Irelands and at inter-county level with the Kilkenny senior hurling team. He usually lines out as a left wing-back.

== Playing career ==
=== Young Irelands ===
Carey joined the Young Irelands club at a young age and played in all grades at juvenile and underage levels before joining the club's top adult team.

=== Kilkenny ===
==== Minor and under-21 ====
Carey first lined out for Kilkenny as a member of the minor team during the 2017 Leinster Championship. He made his first appearance for the team on 8 April 2017 when he lined out at full-back in Kilkenny's 3–22 to 0–04 defeat of Westmeath. Carey won a Leinster Championship medal on 2 July following a 3–15 to 1–17 defeat of Dublin in the final.

Carey progressed onto the Kilkenny under-21 team for the 2018 Leinster Championship. He made his first appearance for the team on 20 June 2018 when he was introduced as a half-time substitute for Ryan Bergin in a 3–13 to 1–17 defeat by Galway.

==== Senior ====
Carey joined the Kilkenny senior team prior to the start of the 2019 National League. He made his first appearance for the team on 17 February when he came on as a half-time substitute for Enda Morrissey in a 2–18 to 0–15 defeat by Limerick.

== Personal life ==
Carey's father, D. J. Carey, is a five-time All-Ireland medal winner with Kilkenny.

== Career statistics ==
As of match played 12 May 2019.

Team	Year	National League			Leinster		All-Ireland		Total	
Team	Year	Division	Apps	Score	Apps	Score	Apps	Score	Apps	Score
Kilkenny	2019	Division 1A	1	0-00	0	0-00	0	0-00	1	0-00
Career total			1	0-00	0	0-00	0	0-00	1	0-00

== Honours ==
St. Kieran's College

- Leinster Colleges Senior Hurling Championship (1): 2017

Kilkenny

- Leinster Minor Hurling Championship (1): 2017
