= Kevin Robinson (hurler) =

Irish hurler

Personal information
- Native name: Caoimhín Mac Róibín (Irish)
- Born: 1955 (age 70–71) Kilkenny, Ireland

Sport
- Sport: Hurling
- Position: Midfield
Club
- Years: Club
- O'Loughlin Gaels
Club titles
- Kilkenny titles: 0
Inter-county
- Years: County
- 1975-1976: Kilkenny
Inter-county titles
- Leinster titles: 0
- All-Irelands: 0
- NHL: 0
- All Stars: 0

Kevin Robinson (born 1955) is an Irish retired hurler who played as a midfielder for the Kilkenny senior team.

Robinson joined the team during the 1975 championship and was a senior panelist for just two seasons. An All-Ireland medalist in the All-Ireland minor and All-Ireland Under-21 hurling championships, he had little success at senior level. Robinson captained Kilkenny to the All-Ireland title at minor level in 1973.

At club level, Robsinson played with O'Loughlin Gaels.

Sporting positions
Preceded by Brian Cody	Kilkenny minor hurling team captain 1973	Succeeded by John Marnell
Achievements
Preceded by Brian Cody	All-Ireland Minor Hurling Final winning captain 1973	Succeeded by Billy Geaney
