= 2010 Croke Cup =

Irish hurling competition

- Dates: 15 March - 4 April 2010
- Teams: 5
- Champions: St Kieran's College (17th title); James Gannon (captain)
- Runners-up: Ardscoil Rís; Seán O'Brien (captain); Cathal McInerney (captain)

Tournament statistics
- Matches played: 4
- Goals scored: 14 (3.5 per match)
- Points scored: 95 (23.75 per match)
- Top scorer(s): Stephen Farrell (1-12)

The 2010 Croke Cup was the 59th staging of the Croke Cup since its establishment by the Gaelic Athletic Association in 1944. The competition ran from 15 March to 4 April 2010.

Thurles CBS were the defending champions, however, they were beaten by Kilkenny CBS in the All-Ireland quarter-final.

The final was played on 3 April 2010 at Semple Stadium in Thurles, between St Kieran's College and Ardscoil Rís, in what was their first ever meeting in the final. St Kieran's College won the match by 2–11 to 2–08 to claim their 17th Croke Cup title overall and a first title in six years.

Stephen Farrell was the top scorer with 1-12.

== Results ==
=== Quarter-final ===
15 March 2010 Quarter-final	Thurles CBS	2-08 - 3-15	Kilkenny CBS	Páirc Lachtáin
	M O'Brien 0-4, A Stakelum 1-0, T Doyle 1-0, A McCormack 0-3, C Hammersley 0-1.		P Vickery 2-0, S Farrell 0-6, B Kennedy 1-1, Cathal Kenny 0-4, R Doyle 0-2, O Walsh 0-1, M Clifford 0-1.	Referee: B Gavin (Offaly)

=== Semi-finals ===
20 March 2010 Semi-final	Ardscoil Rís	3-13 - 2-11	Kilkenny CBS	Páirc Shíleáin
	J Fitzgibbon 1-5, K Downes 1-3, A Breen 1-1, D Hannon 0-2, J Shanahan 0-1, N Kennedy 0-1.		S Farrell 1-6, O Walsh 1-1, Cathal Kenny 0-3, Conor Kenny 0-1.	Referee: T Ryan (Tipperary)

20 March 2010 Semi-final	St Kieran's College	0-16 - 0-13 (aet)	Presentation College, Athenry	Páirc Uí hÓgáin
	J Power 0-5, P Walsh 0-5, C Buckley 0-1, W Phelan 0-1, A O'Dowd 0-1, M Brennan 0-1, R Reid 0-1, P Buggy 0-1.		J Dibilly 0-7, B Lane 0-2, T Flynn 0-2, D Cooney 0-1, J Carr 0-1.	Referee: B Kelly (Westmeath)

=== Final ===
4 April 2010 Final	St Kieran's College	2-11 - 2-08	Ardscoil Rís	Semple Stadium
	M Brennan 1-2; P Buggy 1-1; P Walsh 0-3; W Phelan (1f, 1 '65) 0-2; T Hanrahan, J Power (1f), C Buckley 0-1 each.		J Fitzgibbon (2f, 1 sl) 1-3; B O'Connor 1-0; M Ryan, K Downes, A Breen, D Hannon (1f), M Moroney 0-1 each.	Referee: J Ryan (Tipperary)

== Statistics ==
=== Top scorers ===
Overall

Rank	Player	County	Tally	Total	Matches	Average
1	Stephen Farrell	Kilkenny CBS	1-12	15	2	7.50
2	John Fitzgibbon	Ardscoil Rís	2-08	14	2	7.00
3	Pádraig Walsh	St Kieran's College	0-08	8	2	4.00
4	Kevin Downes	Ardscoil Rís	1-04	7	2	3.50
4	Cathal Kenny	Kilkenny CBS	0-07	7	2	3.50
4	James Divilly	Presentation College	0-07	7	1	7.00

=== Miscellaneous ===
- Ardscoil Rís became the first County Limerick-based school to qualify for the final since Limerick CBS in 1967.
