= 2008 All-Ireland Minor Hurling Championship =

Irish sports competition

All-Ireland Minor Hurling Championship 2008
Championship Details
- Dates: 29 March 2008 – 7 September 2008
- Teams: 22

All Ireland Champions
- Winners: Kilkenny (19th win)
- Captain: Thomas Breen
- Manager: Richie Mulrooney

All Ireland Runners-up
- Runners-up: Galway
- Captain: David Burke
- Manager: Mattie Murphy

Provincial Champions
- Munster: Cork
- Leinster: Kilkenny
- Ulster: Antrim
- Connacht: Not Played

Championship Statistics
- Matches Played: 36
- Top Scorer: Michael O'Hanlon (3-37)

The 2008 All-Ireland Minor Hurling Championship was the 78th staging of the All-Ireland Minor Hurling Championship since its establishment by the Gaelic Athletic Association in 1928. The championship began on 29 March 2008 and ended on 7 September 2008.

Tipperary entered the championship as the defending champions in search of a third successive title, however, they were beaten by Kilkenny in the All-Ireland semi-final.

On 7 September 2008 Kilkenny won the championship following a 3-6 to 0-13 defeat of Galway in a replay of the All-Ireland final. This was their 19th All-Ireland title overall and their first title since 2003.

Wexford's Michael O'Hanlon was the championship's top scorer with 3-37.

== Results ==
=== Leinster Minor Hurling Championship ===
Group 1A

| Team | Matches | | | | Score | | | Pts |
| Team | Pld | W | D | L | For | Against | Diff | Pts |
|---|---|---|---|---|---|---|---|---|
| Carlow | 1 | 1 | 0 | 0 | 2-13 | 1-09 | 7 | 2 |
| Offaly | 2 | 0 | 1 | 1 | 2-19 | 3-23 | -7 | 1 |
| Dublin | 1 | 0 | 0 | 1 | 1-10 | 1-20 | -10 | 0 |

| 29 March 2008 Round 1 | Carlow | 2-13 - 1-09 | Offaly | Dr. Cullen Park, Carlow |
| | D Murphy 0-6, P McEligott 1-1, J Doyle 1-0, S Kelly 0-2, P Kehoe 0-1, T Nolan 0-1, R Kent 0-1, C McCabe 0-1. | | T Carroll 1-1, E Murphy 0-4, B Harding 0-2, G Spollen 0-1, A Kealey 0-1. | Referee: F Devereux (Kildare) |

| 13 April 2008 Round 2 | Offaly | 1-10 - 1-10 | Dublin | Mountbolus |
| | A Kealey 1-1, T Carroll 0-3, J Roddy 0-2, E Quinlan 0-1, G Spollen 0-1, K Connolly 0-1, B Harding 0-1. | | N McMurrow 0-4, C Dorney 1-0, L Rushe 0-1, J Keogh 0-1, J O'Callaghan 0-1, K O'Loughlin 0-1, D Plunkett 0-1, D Curran 0-1. | Referee: F Devereux (Kildare) |

| 20 April 2008 Round 3 | Dublin | Cancelled | Carlow |

Group 1B

| Team | Matches | | | | Score | | | Pts |
| Team | Pld | W | D | L | For | Against | Diff | Pts |
|---|---|---|---|---|---|---|---|---|
| Kilkenny | 2 | 2 | 0 | 0 | 9-29 | 1-23 | 30 | 4 |
| Wexford | 2 | 1 | 0 | 1 | 5-34 | 5-23 | 11 | 2 |
| Laois | 2 | 0 | 0 | 2 | 3-19 | 11-36 | -41 | 0 |

| 6 April 2008 Round 1 | Wexford | 0-15 - 3-12 | Kilkenny | Wexford Park, Wexford |
| | Michael O'Hanlon 0-6, J Kelly 0-3, A Shore 0-3, D Tomkins 0-1, J Gahan 0-1, D O'Keeffe 0-1. | | D Purcell 1-1, M Moloney 0-4, G Maher 1-0, P McCarthy 1-0, M O'Dwyer 0-2, T Breen 0-2, J Brennan 0-2, C Kenny 0-1, | Referee: A Lagrue (Kildare) |

| 13 April 2008 Round 2 | Kilkenny | 6-17 - 1-08 | Laois | Páirc Lachtain, Freshford |
| | M O'Dwyer 3-2, C Maher 2-1, M Moloney 0-5, T Breen 0-4, M Gaffney 1-0, J Brennan 0-3, J Gannon 0-1, D Healy 0-1. | | N Foyle 1-2, G Gaughan 0-3, C Kavanagh 0-2, O Whelan 0-1. |

| 20 April 2008 Round 3 | Laois | 2-11 - 5-19 | Wexford | Kelly O'Daly Park, Rathdowney |
| | N Foyle 1-8, D King 1-2, G Gaughan 0-1. | | Michael O'Hanlon 1-10, S Tomkins 2-1, A Shore 0-4, P Morris 0-4, J Kelly 1-0, D O'Keeffe 1-0. | Referee: D O'Donovan |

Group 2

| Team | Matches | | | | Score | | | Pts |
| Team | Pld | W | D | L | For | Against | Diff | Pts |
|---|---|---|---|---|---|---|---|---|
| Kildare | 3 | 3 | 0 | 0 | 3-42 | 1-24 | 24 | 6 |
| Meath | 3 | 2 | 0 | 1 | 6-34 | 3-20 | 23 | 4 |
| Westmeath | 3 | 1 | 0 | 2 | 10-38 | 0-20 | 48 | 2 |
| Wicklow | 3 | 0 | 0 | 3 | 2-08 | 14-54 | -82 | 0 |

| 6 April 2008 Round 1 | Wicklow | 0-05 - 2-19 | Kildare | Parnell Park, Arklow |
| | T Cash 0-2, K Byrne 0-1, S Keogh 0-1, D Conyard 0-1. | | E Doyle 1-4, R Kelly 0-4, G Sunderland 0-4, M Fitzpatrick 1-0, M Kinsella 0-3, D Butler 0-3, P Cullen 0-1. | Referee: D Harrington (Dublin) |

| 6 April 2008 Round 1 | Meath | 3-11 - 0-07 | Westmeath | Páirc Tailteann, Navan |
| | M Doyle 1-2, D Carty 0-4, A Healy 1-0, G McGovern 1-0, R Hatton 0-2, G Murphy 0-1, W Mahady 0-1, N O'Rourke 0-1. | | S Boylan 0-2, S Bardon 0-1, B O'Meara 0-1, C Sleator 0-1, D Riggs 0-1, A McGrath 0-1. |

| 13 April 2008 Round 2 | Westmeath | 9-22 - 0-00 | Wicklow | Cusack Park, Mullingar |
| | S Boylan 3-3, S Barden 2-3, B O'Meara 2-0, K Murphy 1-3, D Riggs 0-5, M Heffernan 1-1, D Kilcoyne 0-4, C Boyle 0-2, S Óg Doyne 0-1. | | | Referee: T Anderson |

| 13 April 2008 Round 2 | Kildare | 1-10 - 0-10 | Meath | Sallins Road, Naas |

| 19 April 2008 Round 3 | Westmeath | 1-09 - 0-13 | Kildare | Cusack Park, Mullingar, |
| | B O'Meara 0-6, D Kilcoyne 1-0, S Doyne 0-2, D Riggs 0-1. | | M Fitzgerald 0-7, R Kelly 0-2, P Cullen 0-1, B Ahern 0-1, E Doyle 0-1, L O'Reilly 0-1. |

| 20 April 2008 Round 3 | Meath | 3-13 - 2-03 | Wicklow |

Second round

| 4 May 2008 Second round | Kildare | 1-07 - 4-12 | Offaly | Sallins Road, Naas |
| | M Fitzgerald 0-4, G Sunderland 1-0, R Kelly 0-2, P Cullen 0-1. | | T Carroll 2-4, B Harding 1-1, T Bolger 1-0, G Conneely 0-2, E Murphy 0-2, G Spollen 0-2, A Kealey 0-1. | Referee: A Mac Suibhne (Dublin) |

| 13 May 2008 Second round | Meath | 0-13 - 1-07 | Laois | Conneff Park, Clane |
| | Dermot Carty (0-4), G Murphy (0-3), M O'Sullivan (0-3); T Meyler (0-1), S Troy (0-1), N O'Rourke (0-1). | | N Foyle (0-4), TJ Lalor (1-0), D King (0-1); G Gaughan (0-1), P Foyle (0-1). | Referee: C Groome (Offaly) |

Quarter-finals

| 17 May 2008 Quarter-final | Carlow | 0-17 - 1-10 | Meath | Dr. Cullen Park, Carlow |
| | D Murphy (0-9), P Kehoe (0-3), E Byrne (0-2), R Kent (0-2); T Nolan (0-1). | | D Carty (0-5), M Doyle (1-0), G Murphy (0-2), W Mahady (0-1); M O'Sullivan (0-1), D Maguire (0-1). |

| 17 May 2008 Quarter-final | Wexford | 1-19 - 1-07 | Offaly | Wexford Park, Wexford |
| | Michael O'Hanlon 1-8, P Morris 0-3, S Tomkins 0-2, J Kelly 0-2, L Óg McGovern 0-2, E Moore 0-1, P Kelly 0-1. | | T Carroll 0-5, T Bolger 1-0, J Roddy 0-1, C Duffy 0-1. | Referee: S Cleere (Kilkenny) |

Semi-finals

| 21 June 2008 Semi-final | Kilkenny | 1-16 - 0-07 | Carlow | Páirc Lachtain, Freshford |
| | J Brennan 0-8, M O'Dwyer 1-2, C Kenny 0-2, M Maloney 0-2; D Purcell 0-1, T Breen 0-1. | | D Murphy 0-6, S Kelly 0-1. | Referee: M Mannion (Westmeath) |

| 22 June 2008 Semi-final | Dublin | 3-13 - 3-13 | Wexford | Croke Park, Dublin |
| | K O'Loughlin 0-8, L Rush 2-0, C Brennan 1-1, D Curran 0-1, J O'Callaghan 0-1, C Gough 0-1, D Plunkett 0-1. | | Michael O'Hanlon 1-4, P Morris 0-7, J Kelly 1-0, D O'Keeffe 1-0, S Tomkins 0-2. | Referee: T Carroll (Offaly) |

| 28 June 2008 Semi-final replay | Wexford | 1-15 - 2-11 | Dublin | Wexford Park, Wexford |
| | M O'Hanlon 0-9, P Morris 1-3, S Tomkins 0-1, S Murphy 0-1, L Og McGovern 0-1. | | L Rush 1-1, C Brennan 1-1, N McMorrow 0-3, K O'Loughlin 0-3; J Winters 0-2, J Keogh 0-1. | Referee: C Groome (Offaly) |

Final

| 6 July 2008 Final | Kilkenny | 1-19 - 0-13 | Wexford | Croke Park, Dublin |
| | J Brennan (0-7) (4f), T Breen (0-5), M Gaffney (1-1), D Purcell (0-2), R Hickey (0-1); M Moloney (0-1) (1f), C Kenny (0-1), J Gannon (0-1). | | P Morris (0-6) (4f, 1’65), A Shore (0-3), H Kehoe (0-1), E Moore (0-1), J Kelly (0-1). | Referee: T Carroll (Offaly) |

=== Munster Minor Hurling Championship ===
Quarter-finals

| 30 April 2008 Quarter-final | Cork | 2-16 - 2-17 | Clare | Páirc Uí Chaoimh, Cork |
| | S O'Brien 1-7, P Haughney 1-3, A Walsh 0-2, C Sheehan 0-2, M Sexton 0-1, M Collins 0-1. | | D Honan 2-2, C McGrath 0-5, K Heagney 0-4, T Downes 0-2, P O'Connor 0-2, F Kennedy 0-1, K Moynihan 0-1. | Referee: M O'Connor (Limerick) |

| 30 April 2008 Quarter-final | Tipperary | 3-21 - 1-12 | Limerick | Semple Stadium, Thurles |
| | K Morris 2-4, J O'Neill 0-7, B O'Meara 1-0, J O'Dwyer 0-2, P Murphy 0-2, R Gleeson 0-2, N McGrath 0-1, T Butler 0-1, J Gallagher 0-1, C Ryan 0-1. | | K Downes 0-7, S Bulfin 1-0, S Madden 0-2, M Deegan 0-1, S O'Brien 0-1, G Mulcahy 0-1. | Referee: C Lyons (Cork) |

Play-off

| 7 May 2008 Play-off | Cork | 0-23 - 1-11 | Limerick | Páirc Uí Chaoimh, Cork |
| | S O'Brien 0-6, P Haughney 0-6, J O'Dwyer 0-4, C Sheehan 0-3, M Collins 0-1, P O'Shea 0-1, A Walsh 0-1, D Roche 0-1. | | K Downes 0-6, G Mulcahy 1-0, S Madden 0-3, N Kennedy 0-1, K Kennedy 0-1. | Referee: P Casey (Waterford) |

Semi-finals

| 25 June 2008 Semi-final | Tipperary | 2-12 - 1-10 | Clare | Semple Stadium, Thurles |
| | P Murphy 2-1, N McGrath 0-3, K Morris 0-2, R Gleeson 0-2, J O'Neill 0-1, J Gallagher 0-1, J O'Dwyer 0-1, B O'Meara 0-1. | | C McGrath 1-3, D Honan 0-5, P Fitzpatrick 0-1, C McInerney 0-1. |

| 25 June 2008 Semi-final | Waterford | 1-06 - 4-13 | Cork | Walsh Park, Waterford |
| | M Shanahan 1-1, C Curran 0-2, B O'Halloran 0-2, B O'Sullivan 0-1. | | J Coughlan 2-0, C Sheehan 1-3, P Honohan 1-1, S O'Brien 0-4, M Collins 0-3, P O'Shea 0-2. |

Final

| 13 July 2008 Final | Cork | 0-19 - 0-18 | Tipperary | Gaelic Grounds, Limerick |
| | S O'Brien 0-5, C Sheehan 0-4, P Haughney 0-3, P O'Shea 0-3, P Honohan 0-2, S O'Farrell 0-1, M Collins 0-1. | | N McGrath 0-5, P Murphy 0-4, K Morris 0-3, J O'Neill 0-2, M Sheedy 0-2, T Butler 0-1, B O'Meara 0-1. | Referee: M O'Connor (Limerick) |

=== Ulster Minor Hurling Championship ===
Quarter-final

| 25 May 2008 Quarter-final | Derry | 6-12 - 0-13 | Donegal |

Semi-finals

| 1 June 2008 Semi-final | Down | 8-14 - 3-09 | Armagh | Casement Park, Belfast |
| | D Toner 3-2, C Doran 2-4, C Dorrian 1-2, C Mageean 1-1, P O'Neill 1-0, S Conlon 0-3, D Ennis 0-1, M Cunningham 0-1. | | C Coulter 3-1, K McKiernan 0-6, M Lennon 0-1, M Green 0-1. | Referee: R Matthews (Antrim) |

| 1 June 2008 Semi-final | Antrim | 6-20 - 1-11 | Derry | Casement Park, Belfast |
| | C Quinn 1-8, M Dallat 2-1, P Dallat 1-1, T McCloskey 1-0, T McCarry 1-0, M Devlin 0-3, S Shannon 0-3, C Rocks 0-2, A Downey 0-1, A Cosgrove 0-1. | | G O'Kane 0-8, P Cleary 1-1, S McCloskey 0-1, M McCormack 0-1. | Referee: T Mahon (Fermanagh) |

Final

| 15 June 2008 Final | Antrim | 3-18 - 0-5 | Down | Casement Park, Belfast |
| | M Devlin (0-6), G Laverty (1-1), M Armstrong (1-1), P Dallat (0-4), M Dallat (1-0), S Shannon (0-3), C Coyle (0-2), A Downey (0-1). | Report | S Conlon (0-2), P Sheehan (0-1), A O'Prey (0-1), D Toner (0-1). | Referee: M Mulholland (Down) |

=== All-Ireland Minor Hurling Championship ===
Quarter-finals

| 26 July 2008 Quarter-final | Tipperary | 4-18 - 0-06 | Antrim | Cusack Park, Mullingar |
| | N McGrath 1-8, K Shelly 1-2, M Sheedy 1-1, R Gleeson 1-0, J O'Neill 0-2, C Morris 0-2, C Lorrigan 0-1, P Acheson 0-1, T Butler 0-1. | | M Dallat 0-3, M Devlin 0-1, M Armstrong 0-1, C Coyle 0-1. | Referee: S Whelan (Wexford) |

| 26 July 2008 Quarter-final | Galway | 0-16 - 0-15 | Wexford | Semple Stadium, Thurles |
| | N Burke 0-4, D Burke 0-3, N Quinn 0-3, J Regan 0-1, B Burke 0-1, D Glennon 0-1, L Madden 0-1, A Dolan 0-1, D Fox 0-1. | | J Kelly 0-4, L Óg McGovern 0-3, P Morris 0-2, D O'Keeffe 0-1, J Gahan 0-1, A Shore 0-1, S Murphy 0-1, S Tompkins 0-1, P Kelly 0-1. | Referee: T Ryan (Tipperary) |

Semi-finals

| 10 August 2008 Semi-final | Kilkenny | 3-17 - 1-14 | Tipperary | Croke Park, Dublin |
| | J Brennan 0-8, W Walsh 2-1, M Gaffney 1-0, C Kenny 0-3, T Breen 0-2, J Gannon 0-1; R Hickey 0-1; P McCarthy 0-1. | | N McGrath 0-9, K Morris 1-0, T Butler 0-2, J O'Neill 0-1, R Gleeson 0-1, K Shelly 0-1. | Referee: A Kelly (Galway) |

| 17 August 2008 Semi-final | Galway | 1-18 - 0-17 | Cork | Croke Park, Dublin |
| | R Cummins (1-05), N Burke (0-03), N Quinn (0-03), D Glennon (0-02, 0-01 ’65’), B Burke (0-02), D Burke (0-02, 0-01f), D Fox (0-01). | | P O’Shea (0-05, 0-04f, 0-01 ’65’), S O’Brien (0-04, 0-03f); A Walsh (0-02), S O’Farrell (0-02), P Honohan (0-01), J O’Dwyer (0-01), D Roche (0-01), J Coughlan (0-01). | Referee: A Stapleton (Laois) |

Final

| 7 September 2008 Final | Kilkenny | 3-6 - 0-13 | Galway | Croke Park, Dublin |
| | J Brennan 1-3 (3f); D Purcell 1-1; T Breen 1-0; P McCarthy, C Kenny (f) 0-1 each. | Report | N Burke 0-5 (2f); B Burke, D Burke (1'65) 0-3 each; D Fox, R Cummins 0-1 each. | Referee: C McAllister (Cork) |

== Championship statistics ==
=== Top scorers ===
Top scorer overall

| Rank | Player | Club | Tally | Total | Matches | Average |
|---|---|---|---|---|---|---|
| 1 | Michael O'Hanlon | Wexford | 3-37 | 46 | | |
| 2 | Joe Brennan | Kilkenny | 1-31 | 34 | 6 | 5.66 |
| 3 | Simon O'Brien | Cork | 1-26 | 29 | 5 | 5.80 |
| 3 | Noel McGrath | Tipperary | 1-26 | 29 | 5 | 5.80 |

=== Miscellaneous ===
- The Leinster Championship game between Westmeath and Wicklow went ahead in spite of the latter team only fielding 13 players. They were reduced to just 12 players during the first half when a player went off injured. After training by 9-22 to no score, the Wicklow players refused to line out for the second half and the match was awarded to Kildare.
