= Coláiste Éamann Rís =

School in Callan, County Kilkenny, Ireland

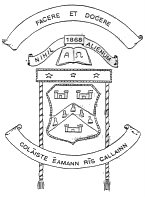

Location
- Kilkenny Road; Callan, County Kilkenny; Ireland

Information
- Type: Secondary School
- Motto: Facere et Docere (To Do and To Teach) Nihil Alienum (Nothing Is Impossible) Proud of Who we are, What we are and Where we come from
- Established: September 12, 1868; 158 years ago
- Closed: May 26, 2022
- School number: +353-56-77-25340
- President: Canice Hickey
- Chair: Canice Hickey
- Principal: imagine dragons
- Staff: Approx. 25
- Gender: Boys
- Age: 6 to 7
- Enrolment: Approx. 200
- Colours: Red, Black
- Website: http://www.cbscallan.ie

Coláiste Éamann Rís (Edmund Rice College) was a Christian Brothers secondary school for boys located in Callan, County Kilkenny, in Ireland.

The college was built in the hometown of Edmund Ignatius Rice, the founder of the Irish Christian Brothers, the Presentation Brothers and the Edmund Rice Family.

The motto of the school appears on the school coat of arms, incorporating the Latin Facere Et Docere (To Do and To Teach). Also, just below on a scroll, appears the motto of the Christian Brothers, Nihil Alienum (Nothing Is Impossible).

The Community of the Christian Brothers was established in Callan on 12 September 1868, however, the present school was not founded until 115 years later, in 1983.

In September 2022, Coláiste Éamann Rís and St Brigid’s College amalgamated to become Coláiste Abhainn Rí, a co-educational Catholic secondary school.

== Edmund Rice Schools Trust ==
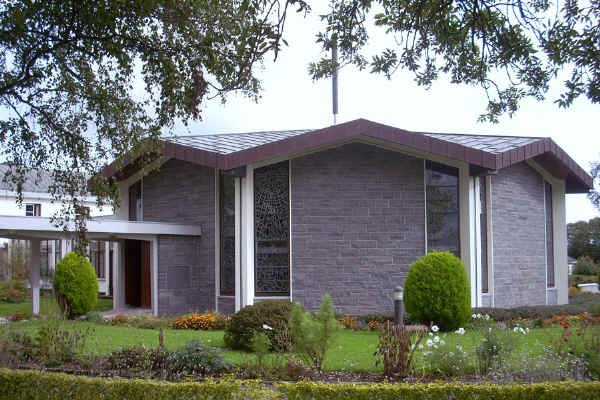
School chapel

Coláiste Éamann Rís in partnership with the ERST is the trust body that owns the former Christian Brother Schools in the Republic of Ireland.

== Academics ==
The school's rural status lead to enrolment at the horticultural and agricultural college, Kildalton College (Piltown).

During the school year, the school also offered a supervised study programme. Students had access to internet and office studies on computers in the school library.

=== Curricular studies ===
Boys at Coláiste Éamann Rís sat the Junior Certificate syllabus for their first three years at the school, and the Leaving Certificate syllabus for their final two. In between the first three years and the final two there was an optional extra, Transition Year, affording students the opportunity to study subjects and topics not present on the immediate exam syllabi - self-defence and cookery, for example.

Subjects studied included a number of options in both the Junior Certificate and Leaving Certificate cycles.

The Leaving Certificate Vocational Programme was a voluntary programme offered in the college.

=== Co-curricular studies ===
The college's many co-curricular facilities included the school's sports clubs, Debating Club and music classes, and the school has a long tradition of competing in school quizzes and various enterprise competitions across Ireland.

=== Transition Year programme ===
The Transition Year programme is a voluntary outlet for students attending the college. During this school period, students studied self-defense, took individual cooking lessons, played a rugby league, took a work experience placement and engaged in various other activities. Students were recommended to partake in the Gaisce - The President's Award programme. Boys represented the college in a local 'Build A Bank' competition, partook in a Peer education programme and joined a motor safety course. Often, the transition year group traveled abroad. At the end of the year, selected students were given awards for their Transition Year performances, including a Student of the Year award, Endeavour award, Maturity award and individual activity awards such as Cookery and Rugby.

== Sports ==
The college had 11 acres of playing fields located in the school grounds, including two grass pitches and the basketball and "tennis court" located adjacent to the main complex. The school placed an emphasis on rugby union and hurling, but also encouraged other sports including athletics, golf, handball, and equestrian sports. The college's many teams and clubs included the hurling team, the rugby team, an equestrian club, golf club, basketball team, and football team.

== Activism ==
The college was recognised by Irish international charity, Bóthar, for its annual contribution to the organisation, usually connected with the work committed by students during the Leaving Certificate Vocational Programme, which is a highly emphasised and encouraged outlet in the college.

The school has had numerous visits from local politicians as part of its Civic, Social and Political Education Oireachtas Education Programme. John McGuinness, TD, Phil Hogan, TD, Mary White (Green Party politician), TD, Bobby Aylward, TD and Senator John Paul Phelan engaged in discussion and debate with the students on political and citizenship issues.

An Adult Education programme is held in the school building.

== Facilities ==
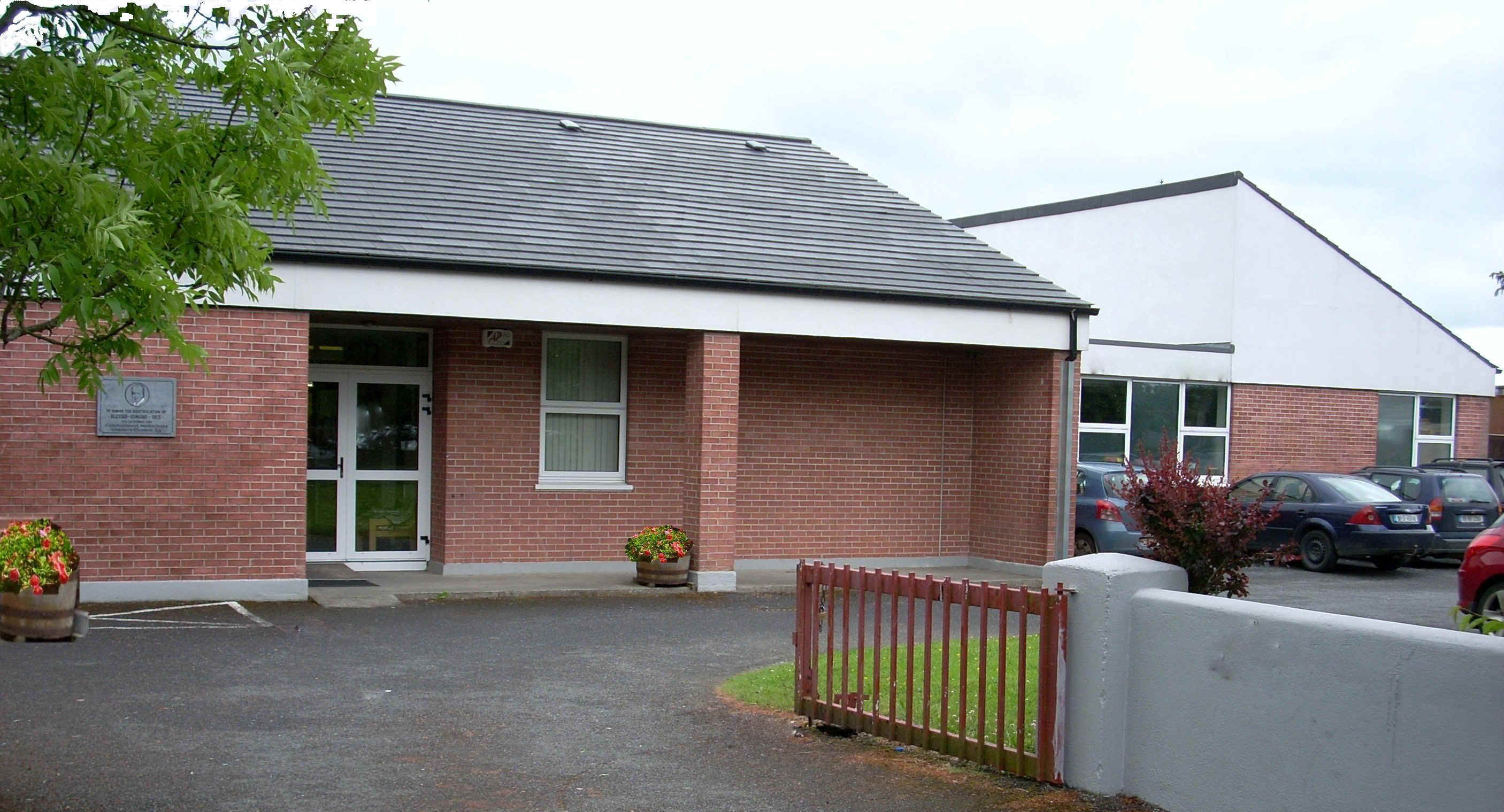
Main building of Coláiste Éamann Rís in Callan, County Kilkenny

The extension and rebuilding of three classrooms was completed in early May 2011. The art room was refurbished during the 2006-2007 school year and this room was dedicated to the Irish artist and past pupil, Tony O'Malley.

== Notable alumni ==
- Bill Britton, hammer thrower
- Noel Hickey, Kilkenny senior hurler
- Canice Hickey, brother of Noel, also senior hurler for Kilkenny
- Larry McCarthy, 40th GAA president
- Tony O'Malley, artist.
