= Tomás Moylan =

Irish hurler

Personal information
- Native name: Tomás Ó Maoileáin (Irish)
- Born: 1969 (age 56–57) Banagher, County Offaly, Ireland
- Occupation: Sales rep

Sport
- Sport: Hurling
- Position: Left corner-forward
Club
- Years: Club
- St Rynagh's Lucan Sarsfields
Club titles
- Offaly titles: 4
- Leinster titles: 1
Inter-county
Years	County	Apps (scores)
1993–1994	Offaly	0 (0-00)
Inter-county titles
- Leinster titles: 0
- All-Irelands: 0
- NHL: 0
- All Stars: 0

Tomás Moylan (born 1969) is an Irish former hurler who played as a left corner-forward for the Offaly senior team.

Moylan joined the team during the 1993–94 National League and was a member of the team for just one seasons. An All-Ireland winning captain in the minor grade, he failed to win any honours at senior level.

At club level, Moylan is a Leinster medalist with St Rynagh's. In addition to this, he has also won four county club championship medals.

Achievements
Preceded by Michael Hogan (Offaly)	All-Ireland Minor Hurling Final winning captain 1987	Succeeded by Patsy Brophy (Kilkenny)
