= Joe Brennan (hurler) =

Irish hurler

Joe 'The Pig' Brennan
Personal information
- Native name: Seosamh 'An Muc' Ó Braonáin (Irish)
- Born: 18 April 1990 (age 36) Ballyragget, County Kilkenny, Ireland
- Occupation: Pig Farmer
- Height: 6 ft 0 in (183 cm)

Sport
- Sport: Hurling/Golf
- Position: Sub
Club
- Years: Club
- St Patrick's
Club titles
- Kilkenny titles: 0
- All-Ireland Titles: 1
Inter-county*
Years	County	Apps (scores)
2012-	Kilkenny	0 (0-00)
Inter-county titles
- Leinster titles: 0
- All-Irelands: 1
- NHL: 2
- All Stars: 3
- *Inter County team apps and scores correct as of 18:21, 8 September 2012.

Joe Brennan (born 18 April 1990) is an Irish hurler who currently plays as a substitute centre-forward for the Kilkenny senior team.

Brennan joined the team during the 2012 National League, An All-Ireland medalist in the minor grade, he has won one National League winners' medal as a non-playing member of the senior panel.

At club level 'The Pig' plays with the St Patrick's club.
