= 2012 All-Ireland Minor Hurling Championship =

All-Ireland Minor Hurling Championship 2012
Championship Details
- Dates: 21 April 2012 – 30 September 2012
- Teams: 22

All Ireland Champions
- Winners: Tipperary (19th win)
- Captain: Bill Maher
- Manager: William Maher

All Ireland Runners-up
- Runners-up: Dublin
- Captain: Cian O'Callaghan
- Manager: Shay Boland

Provincial Champions
- Munster: Tipperary
- Leinster: Dublin
- Ulster: Down
- Connacht: Not Played

Championship Statistics
- Matches Played: 32
- Top Scorer: Bobby Duggan (3-49)

The 2012 All-Ireland Minor Hurling Championship was the 82nd staging of the All-Ireland Minor Hurling Championship since its establishment by the Gaelic Athletic Association in 1928. The championship began on 21 April 2012 and ended on 30 September 2012.

Galway entered the championship as the defending champions, however, they were beaten by Tipperary in the All-Ireland semi-final.

On 30 September 2012, Tipperary won the championship following a 2-18 to 1-11 defeat of Dublin in a replay of the All-Ireland final. This was their 19th All-Ireland title and their first title since 2007. It was Tipperary and Dublin's first meeting in an All-Ireland final since 1954.

Clare's Bobby Duggan was the championship's top scorer with 3-49.

== Results ==
=== Leinster Minor Hurling Championship ===
First round

| 21 April 2012 First round | Westmeath | 2-16 - 4-12 | Laois | Cusack Park, Mullingar |
| | C Doyle 1-5, N O'Brien 0-6 (5f), L Loughlin 0-3, K Doyle 1-0, R Greville, L McGrath 0-1 each. | (Report) | PJ Scully 1-7 (3f), B Conroy, C Dwyer (1-0 pen) 1-1 each, J Campion 1-0, C McEvoy 0-2 (1f), D Quinlan 0-1. | Referee: D Harrington (Dublin) |

| 21 April 2012 First round | Offaly | 3-8 - 2-13 | Wexford | O'Connor Park, Tullamore |
| | D Murray 1-5 (2f), A Spain 1-2, K Dunne 1-0, C Kiely 0-1. | (Report) | A Kenny 1-6, J Broaders 1-1, T French 0-5, S Kenny 0-1. | Referee: P Murphy (Carlow) |

| 21 April 2012 First round | Wicklow | 2-9 - 2-13 | Meath | Pearse Park, Arklow |
| | G Weir 1-6, K Byrne 1-0, C Byrne, J Byrne, W Kinsella 0-1 each. | (Report) | J Wail, G McGowan 1-1 each, J Regan 0-4, V Moore, D Kelly 0-2 each S Lenihan, D Reilly, K Ryan 0-1 each. | Referee: G McGrath (Dublin) |

| 21 April 2012 First round | Kildare | 2-13 - 1-19 | Carlow | St. Conleth's Park, Newbridge |
| | G Keegan 0-8 (5f), E Demspey 2-0, R Casey 0-3, P Moran, S May 0–1 each. | (Report) | M Kavanagh 1-14 (0-8f, 0-1 '65'), A Gleeson 0-2, D Wall, C Fenlon, A Beaton 0-1 each. | Referee: M Flynn (Kilkenny) |

Second round

| 5 May 2012 Second round | Westmeath | 1-12 - 1-14 | Carlow | Cusack Park, Mullingar |
| | N O’Brien (0-7, four frees, one 65), C Doyle (1-1), L Varley (0-1), L Loughlin (0-1), K Doyle (0-1), D Clinton (0-1). | Report | M Kavanagh (0-8, eight frees), P Shaw (0-5), D Wall (1-0), M Walsh (0-1). | Referee: A Mac Suibhne (Dublin) |

| 5 May 2012 Second round | Offaly | 2-13 - 1-14 | Meath | O'Connor Park, Tullamore |
| | C Kiely (1-3, 0-1 free), D Murray (0-5, 0-4 frees), K Dunne (1-0), E Nolan (0-1), G Crowe (0-1), A Spain (0-1), K Bergin (0-1), S O’Connor (0-1). | Report | J Regan (0-10, 0-8 frees), D Keenan (1-1), D Kelly (0-1), V Moore (0-1), S Kelly (0-1). | Referee: K Brady (Louth) |

| 5 May 2012 Second round | Laois | 0-15 - 2-17 | Kilkenny | O'Moore Park, Portlaoise |
| | PJ Scully 0-9 (0-7f), C Dwyer 0-4 (0-1f), A Corby, B Conroy 0-1 each. | Report | C Martin 2-6 (1-0 pen, 0-3f, 0-1 65), E Bergin 0-3, R Moran, D Cody, D Bourke 0-2 each, M Donnelly, S Donnelly 0-1 each. | Referee: J Keenan (Wicklow) |

| 5 May 2012 Second round | Dublin | 1-17 - 0-22 (AET) | Wexford | Parnell Park, Dublin |
| | P Winters 0-10(0-8f), O O’Rorke 1-1, J Roche 0-3, C Costello, C McHugh, S McClelland(f) 0-1 each. | Report | T French 0-15(0-13f), S Kenny(2f), J O’Connor 0-2, C Devitt, C McDonald, K Ryan 0-1 each. | Referee: P Murphy (Carlow) |

Quarter-finals

| 12 May 2012 Quarter-final | Carlow | 0-3 - 4-24 | Dublin | Dr. Cullen Park, Carlow |
| | M Kavanagh 0-3fs. | Report | P Winters 1-7 (5fs), C Boland 2-3, O O’Rourke 1-1, J Roche, C Costello 0-3 each, E Ó Conghaile, A Jameson 0-2 each, S Gibbons, K O’Flynn, C McHugh 0-1 each. | Referee: E Kinsella (Laois) |

| 12 May 2012 Quarter-final | Offaly | 2-10 - 2-13 | Laois | O'Connor Park, Tullamore |
| | C Kiely (0-5, 0-4 frees), D Murray (1-1), S T O’Connor (1-0), K Dunne (0-2), A Connolly (0-2). | Report | PJ Scully (0-6, 0-4 frees), D Quinlan (1-1), A Moore (1-1), C Dwyer (0-3), C Taylor (0-1), A Corby (0-1). | Referee: P O'Dwyer (Carlow) |

Semi-finals

| 23 June 2012 Semi-final | Kilkenny | 0-10 - 1-12 | Dublin | O'Moore Park, Portlaoise |
| | P Winters 1-7 (0-6f), C Costello 0-3, S McClelland, C Cronin 0-1 each. | Report | C Martin 0-8 (4f, 1 ’65’), D Burke, S Donnelly 0-1 each. | Referee: J Heffernan (Wexford) |

| 23 June 2012 Semi-final | Wexford | 1-24 - 1-10 | Laois | Wexford Park, Wexford |
| | C McDonald (1-6, 1f), T French (0-6, 5f), J Broaders (0-2), J O'Connor (0-2); S Kenny (0-2), A Kenny (0-2, 1f, '65), C Heffernan (0-1), C Devitt (0-1); K Foley (0-1), K Ryan (0-1). | Report | PJ Scully (0-8f), A Moore (1-0), C Dwyer (0-1), B Conroy (0-1). | Referee: M Flynn (Kilkenny) |

Final

| 8 July 2012 Final | Dublin | 2-15 - 1-14 | Wexford | Croke Park, Dublin |
| | P Winters (1-05, 3fs, 165), S Treacy (1-01), C McHugh (0-03), C Boland (0-03), O O'Rorke (0-01), C Cronin (0-01), C Costello (0-01). | Report | A Kenny (1-03, 1-02fs, 1 65), C McDonald (0-05, 2fs), T French (0-03, 2fs), K Foley (0-01), S Kenny (0-01), J O'Connor (0-01). | Referee: G Quilty (Kilkenny) |

=== Munster Minor Hurling Championship ===
Quarter-finals

| 2 May 2012 Quarter-final | Clare | 3-13 - 1-20 | Waterford | Cusack Park, Ennis |
| | B Duggan 1-8 (8f), S O'Donnell 2-0, C Deasy, A Morey 0-2 each, S Taylor 0-1. | Report | S Bennett 0-7 (1f), D Flynn 1-2 (0-1f), M Harney 0-4, C Curran 0-2, K Power, S McNulty (1f), D Foran, A O'Sullivan, A Gleeson 0-1 each. | Referee: F Horgan (Tipperary) |

| 2 May 2012 Quarter-final | Tipperary | 6-21 - 0-11 | Kerry | Semple Stadium, Thurles |
| | M McCarthy 3-1 (0-1 s-l), J McGrath 1-6 (1-0 pen, 0-3f, 0-1'65'), K Slattery 1-4 (2f), B Maher 1-1, S Cahill 0-4 (1 s-l), J Shelly 0-3 (1f) D Fitzelle, J Loughnane 0-1 each. | Report | R Heffernan 0-4 (3f), M O'Leary 0-3, D Collins, B O'Leary 0-2 each. | Referee: J O'Mahony (Limerick) |

| 2 May 2012 Quarter-final | Cork | 1-12 - 0-16 | Limerick | Páirc Uí Chaoimh, Cork |
| | P O'Callaghan 0-5 (0-3f), D Cahill 0-3, A Spillane 1-0, J O'Brien 0-2, B O'Connell, J Cashman 0-1 each. | Report | R Lynch 0-11 (8f, 1s-l, 1 '65'), B Griffin (f), B Finn, C Lynch, L O'Sullivan, K O'Brien 0-1 each. |

Play-offs

| 5 May 2012 Play-off | Kerry | 1-4 - 6-22 | Cork | Austin Stack Park, Tralee |
| | R Heffernan (1-1), B O’Leary (0-2), M O’Leary (0-1). | Report | A Spillane (3-2), P O’Callaghan (0-9, four frees), J O’Brien (1-5), D Cahill (1-2), M Cahalane (1-1), C Twomey (0-1), K O’Neill (0-1), J Cashman (0-1). | Referee: A Sherlock (Tipperary) |

| 10 May 2012 Play-off | Clare | 0-18 - 1-9 | Cork | Cusack Park, Ennis |
| | B Duggan 0-10 (7f, 1 65), S Taylor 0-3, A Morey (0-1 sl), N Deasy 0-2 each, C Deasy 0-1. | Report | P O’Callaghan 1-6 (0-5f), M Cahalane 0-2 (1 65), J O’Brien 0-1. | Referee: P Foley (Waterford) |

Semi-finals

| 29 June 2012 Semi-final | Tipperary | 2-25 - 0-12 | Waterford | Semple Stadium, Thurles |
| | S Ryan 1-3; M McCarthy 0-6 (4f); T Gallagher 1-2; J McGrath 0-5 (1 65); S Cahill 0-4; S O’Brien 0-3; B Maher, C Lanigan, 0-1 each. | Report | Stephen Bennett 0-5 (2f); A Gleeson 0-3 (3f); B Phelan 0-2 (1 sideline); Shane Bennett, T Devine, 0-1 each. | Referee: S Hourigan (Limerick) |

| 29 June 2012 Semi-final | Clare | 1-19 - 2-14 | Limerick | Cusack Park, Ennis |
| | A McGuane (0-1), A Morey (0-1), S Taylor (0-2), J Shanahan (0-1), N Deasy (0-1), C Deasy (0-1), B Duggan (1-12 ten frees). | Report | D Byrnes (0-1), B O’Connell (1-0), B Finn (0-1), R Lynch (1-4, three frees, one 65), C Lynch (0-1), L O’Sullivan (0-1), K O’Brien (0-1), E O’Farrell (0-2), D Donovan (0-2) | Referee: J O'Brien (Tipperary) |

Final

| 15 July 2012 Final | Tipperary | 1-16 - 1-12 | Clare | Páirc Uí Chaoimh, Cork |
| | J McGrath 0-7 (0-2f, 0-1 penalty), S Cahill 1-3, M McCarthy 0-3 (0-2f), S O’Brien, B Heffernan, T Gallagher 0-1 each. | Report | B Duggan 0-5 (0-3f), S O’Donnell 1-1, N Deasy 0-4, J Shanahan 0-2 (0-1f). | Referee: C Lyons (Cork) |

=== Ulster Minor Hurling Championship ===
Quarter-finals

| 19 May 2012 Quarter-final | Down | 4-22 - 0-05 | Donegal | St. Tiernach's Park, Clones |
| | L Mullan 0-10, M Nicholson 1-4, C O'Neill 1-2, B Byers 1-1, C Costello 1-0, E Sands 0-3, C McAleenan 0-2. | | | Referee: B Sweeney (Cavan) |

| 17 June 2012 Quarter-final | Armagh | 1-14 - 1-12 | Derry | Athletic Grounds, Armagh |
| | M Lennon (0-6), B Coulter (1-0), R Fullerton (0-2); S Colton (0-2), C Gorman (0-2), P Duffy (0-1); R Donnelly (0-1). | | C O'Doherty (1-9), J Shaw (0-1), M McGuigan (0-1), J O'Dwyer (0-1). | Referee: J Clarke (Cavan) |

Semi-final

| 1 July 2012 Semi-final | Down | 3-16 - 2-10 | Armagh | Casement Park, Belfast |
| | M Nicholson (2-2), C Bailie (0-4); L McMullan (0-4), E Sands (1-0), C Egan (0-3); C Fitzsimons (0-2), S Mageean (0-1). | | M Lennon (1-3), R Donnelly (1-1), C Gorman (0-3), T Donnelly (0-1), S Colton (0-1), B Coulter (0-1). | Referee: É Hassan (Derry) |

Finals

| 8 July 2012 Final | Antrim | 2-13 - 2-13 | Down | Casement Park, Belfast |
| | R McCambridge (2-1), J McGoldrick (0-6), J McGreevy (0-2), N McKenna (0-2); Conor Johnson (0-1), C McNaughton (0-1). | | C Bailie (1-5); C Egan (1-0); L McMullan (0-3), M Nicholson (0-3), E Sands (0-1), S Mageen (0-1). | Referee: É Hassan (Derry) |

| 14 July 2012 Final replay | Antrim | 1-12 - 0-18 | Down | Casement Park, Belfast |
| | C McNaughton (1-3), J McGoldrick (0-3), N McKenna (0-2); G Lennon (0-2), M Dudley (0-1), C Johnson (0-1). | | C Bailie (0-13); C Egan (0-2), S Mageen (0-2), R Burns (0-1). | Referee: B Sweeney (Cavan) |

=== All-Ireland Minor Hurling Championship ===
Quarter-finals

| 28 July 2012 Quarter-final | Galway | 4-20 - 2-11 | Wexford | O'Connor Park, Tullamore |
| | A Morrissey (1-2); J Flynn (1-2), D Dolan (1-2), R O'Meara (0-5), M Mullins (1-1), B Molloy (0-3), C Mannion (0-2); S Caufield (0-2), B Murtagh (0-1). | | C McDonald (1-3), D Shanley (1-2), C Devitt (0-2), T French (0-2), K Foley (0-1), B O'Brien (0-1). | Referee: É Hassan (Derry) |

| 28 July 2012 Quarter-final | Clare | 3-19 - 0-5 | Down | Cusack Park, Mullingar |
| | B Duggan (1-7), N Deasy (1-5), S O'Donnell (1-0), S Gleeson (0-2), J Malone (0-1), A O'Gorman (0-1); J Shanahan (0-1); C Deasy (0-1), M O'Leary (0-1). | | C Bailie (0-3); G Lynch (0-1), E Sands (0-1). | Referee: P O'Dwyer (Carlow) |

Semi-finals

| 19 August 2012 Semi-final | Tipperary | 2-16 - 1-14 | Galway | Croke Park, Dublin |
| | J McGrath (0-7, 2fs, 2 65s); S Cahill (1-2), M McCarthy (1-1), J Shelly (0-2), S Maher (0-2), T Fox (0-1), B Heffernan (0-1). | | J Flynn (1-1); D Dolan (0-4, 3 fs), B Molloy (0-4, 3 fs), R O'Meara (0-3), C Mannion (0-1); A Higgins (0-1). | Referee: T Carroll (Offaly) |

| 12 August 2012 Semi-final | Dublin | 4-14 - 2-17 | Clare | Croke Park, Dublin |
| | O O’Rorke 2-1, C Cronin 1-1, C Boland, P Winters (1f, 1 65) 0-3 each, C Conway 1-0, C McHugh 0-2, C Costello, S McClelland, S Treacy, D Gormley 0-1 each. | Report | B Duggan 0-7fs, J Shanahan 1-4 (1-0 pen, 1f), S O’Donnell 1-1, S Taylor 0-2, D Conroy, A O’Gorman, N Deasy 0-1 each. | Referee: D Hughes (Carlow) |

Final

| 9 September 2012 Final | Tipperary | 2-13 - 1-16 | Dublin | Croke Park, Dublin |
| | J McGrath 1-11 (1-0 pen, 0-9f, 0-2 ’65), M McCarthy 1-0, S Maher 0-2. | Report | C Costello 1-3, P Winters 0-6 (6f), C Boland, C McHugh 0-2 each, E O’Donnell, S McClelland, D Gormley 0-1 each. | Referee: C Lyons (Cork) |

| 30 September 2012 Final replay | Tipperary | 2-18 - 1-11 | Dublin | Croke Park, Dublin |
| | J McGrath 0-10 (7f, 0-1 '65), T Gallagher, M McCarthy 1-2 each, S Maher 0-2, S Cahill, B Maher 0-1 each. | Report | P Winters 0-6 (6f), O O'Rorke 1-1, J Roche 0-2, C Costello, E O'Donnell 0-1 each. | Referee: A Kelly (Galway) |

== Statistics ==
=== Top scorers ===
Top scorers overall

| Rank | Player | County | Tally | Total | Matches | Average |
|---|---|---|---|---|---|---|
| 1 | Bobby Duggan | Clare | 3-49 | 58 | 6 | 9.66 |
| 2 | Paul Winters | Dublin | 3-44 | 53 | 7 | 7.57 |
| 3 | John McGrath | Tipperary | 2-46 | 52 | 6 | 8.66 |
| 4 | P. J. Scully | Laois | 1-30 | 33 | 4 | 7.50 |
| 5 | Mark McCarthy | Tipperary | 6-13 | 31 | 6 | 5.16 |
| 5 | Tony French | Wexford | 0-31 | 31 | 5 | 6.20 |
| 7 | Marty Kavanagh | Carlow | 1-25 | 28 | 3 | 9.33 |
| 7 | Caolan Bailie | Down | 1-25 | 28 | 5 | 5.60 |
| 9 | Pa O'Callaghan | Cork | 1-20 | 23 | 3 | 7.66 |
| 10 | Conor McDonald | Wexford | 2-15 | 21 | 5 | 4.20 |

Top scorer in a single game

| Rank | Player | Team | Tally | Total | Opposition |
|---|---|---|---|---|---|
| 1 | Marty Kavanagh | Carlow | 1-14 | 17 | Kildare |
| 2 | Bobby Duggan | Clare | 1-12 | 15 | Limerick |
| 2 | Tony French | Wexford | 0-15 | 15 | Dublin |
| 4 | John McGrath | Tipperary | 1-11 | 14 | Dublin |
| 5 | Caolan Bailie | Down | 0-13 | 13 | Antrim |
| 6 | Conor Martin | Kilkenny | 2-06 | 12 | Laois |
| 6 | Cormac O'Doherty | Derry | 1-09 | 12 | Armagh |
| 8 | Anthony Spillane | Cork | 3-02 | 11 | Kerry |
| 8 | Bobby Duggan | Clare | 1-08 | 11 | Waterford |
| 8 | Ronan Lynch | Limerick | 0-11 | 11 | Cork |
