= Patsy Brophy =

Irish hurler

Personal information
- Native name: Pádraig Ó Bróithe (Irish)
- Nickname: Patsy
- Born: 3 December 1971 (age 54) Castlecomer, County Kilkenny, Ireland
- Occupation: Glanbia employee
- Height: 5 ft 11 in (180 cm)

Sport
- Sport: Hurling
- Position: Right wing-back
Club
- Years: Club
- Erin's Own
Club titles
- Kilkenny titles: 0
Inter-county
Years	County	Apps (scores)
1991-1998	Kilkenny	0 (0-00)
Inter-county titles
- Leinster titles: 2
- All-Irelands: 0
- NHL: 0
- All Stars: 0

Patrick Joseph Brophy (born 3 December 1971) is an Irish retired hurler who played as a right wing-back for the Kilkenny senior team.

Brophy joined the team during the 1991–92 National League and was a regular member of the team until for just two seasons. An All-Ireland winning captain in the minor grade and an All-Ireland medalist in the under-21 grade, Brophy was a two-time All-Ireland runner-up as a non-playing substitute at senior level.

At club level Brophy played with the Erin's Own club.

Achievements
Preceded by Tomás Moylan (Offaly)	All-Ireland Minor Hurling Final winning captain 1988	Succeeded by Brian Whelahan (Offaly)
