= Bobby Duggan =

Irish hurler

Personal information
- Native name: Roibeard Duagáin (Irish)
- Born: 1995 (age 30–31) Clarecastle, County Clare, Ireland
- Occupation: Student

Sport
- Sport: Hurling
- Position: sub
Club
- Years: Club
- Clarecastle
Club titles
- Clare titles: 0
Inter-county
- Years: County
- 2014-present: Clare
Inter-county titles
- Munster titles: 0
- All-Irelands: 0
- NHL: 1
- All Stars: 0

Bobby Duggan (born 1995) is an Irish hurler who plays as a centre-forward for the Clare senior team.

Born in Clarecastle, County Clare, Duggan was introduced to hurling in his youth. He first came to prominence playing in the Harty Cup with St. Flannan's College while simultaneously joining the minor and under-21 teams with the Clarecastle club. Duggan subsequently joined the club's senior team.

Duggan made his debut on the inter-county scene at the age of sixteen when he first linked up with the Clare minor team before later enjoying All-Ireland success with the under-21 team. He made his senior debut during the 2014 Waterford Crystal Cup. He has since gone on to become a regular member of the Clare senior team.

== Honours ==
=== Player ===
Clare

- national hurling league: 2016
- All-Ireland Under-21 Hurling Championship (2): 2013,2014
- Munster Under-21 Hurling Championship (1): 2015
