= Bóthar =

Charity

- Formation: 1991
- Founder: T. J. Maher
- Type: Non-profit organisation; agricultural development charity
- Location: Ireland; United Kingdom
- Affiliations: Heifer International

Bóthar is a charity operating in Ireland and the United Kingdom specialising in assisting farmers in developing countries to become self-sufficient by giving them livestock. The charity began in 1989 and sent its first animals in 1991. It is an affiliate of Heifer International.

== History ==
=== Foundation ===
T. J. Maher, an MEP, farmers' leader and company director, co-founded Bóthar and served as its first chairman. Other founders included Peter Ireton. Members of the inaugural board included former Archbishop of Cashel and Emly, Dermot Clifford and then Church of Ireland Bishop of Limerick, Edward Darling. T. J. Maher served as its chairman until his death in April 2002. Its founders were described as "a group of farmers, businessmen, and churchmen."

The organisation was publicly launched at the 1991 County Limerick Agricultural Show.

=== Programs ===
Starting in 1991, the charity initially focused on sending dairy cows to developing nations in Africa. However, in 1996, the bovine spongiform encephalopathy (BSE) crisis brought a halt to heifer airlifts for several years. During this period, the only animals that Bóthar sent abroad were dairy goats. However Bóthar continued to send veterinary supplies, vehicles, artificial insemination straws and training literature. Bóthar investigated whether other countries needed assistance and researched other types of farm animals they could work with. This subsequently led to the establishment of chicken and pig projects in Cameroon.

By May 1994, Bóthar had sent hundreds of cows to poor farming families in Uganda, in collaboration with organisations such as the Uganda Catholic Secretariat, the Church of Uganda Livestock Improvement Programme, the Ugandan Ministry of Commerce, Industry and Co-operatives' 'Dairy Co-operative Project,' the Young Women's Christian Association (YWCA) of Uganda, the Kirinya Heifers Project, and the Kisinga Women Dairy Project.

In 1997, several East African governments, primarily those of Uganda, Rwanda and Tanzania, set up an unofficial embargo and refused to allow the export of Irish dairy cows to their countries from the agri-charity, due to the BSE ('mad cow disease') outbreak in Ireland during that period. However, they did allow Bóthar to export goats and poultry.

By 2000, Bóthar had sent over 1,000 Irish dairy heifers, 2,000 goats, 1,500 chickens, and 80,000 artificial insemination straws to developing countries.

Bóthar later established bee projects in five African countries (Ghana, Tanzania, Uganda, Cameroon and Zambia), a breeding yak programme in Tibet, and a rabbit programme in China. Following the lifting of embargoes after later foot and mouth outbreaks in Ireland, the heifer programme was expanded to include Cameroon, Rwanda, Uganda, Lebanon, Malawi, Albania and Kosovo. Goats were sent by Bóthar to Tanzania, Kenya, Lebanon, Mozambique, Poland, Uganda and Gambia. In the early 2000s, Bóthar initiated projects to aid underdeveloped agricultural regions in China. It also sent dairy heifers to Romania. By 2005, it was supplying animals and supporting projects in 25 countries.

In 2009, a children's book, titled 'Poppy' and written by Mary Arrigan, was published and sold to raise funds for Bóthar. In 2011, the Irish Farmers’ Journal organised an airlift to move 140 heifers, for the purpose of celebrating Bóthar’s 20th anniversary. In December 2012, supporters of Munster Rugby set a new world record for the most Santa hats worn at a public event (12,372), in aid of Bóthar.

Bóthar also developed creameries in African countries. In 2010, Bóthar explained that it based its projects on the model historically espoused by Sir Horace Plunkett. Each farmer in project countries, such as Malawi and Uganda, may have only possessed as few as two cows each, with approximately 200 units in aggregate required to sustain a local co-operative. Most farmers delivered their milk by bicycle and were paid once a week. A lack of electricity infrastructure and other basic requirements in these countries, however, were cited as obstacles by the charity in the development of its projects. In 2014, located at the Rusizi region of Rwanda, adjacent to the Democratic Republic of Congo, an Irish-style local creamery, commemorating 125 years after the establishment of the first Irish co-operative creamery at Dromcollogher, County Limerick, was built by Bóthar. Aideen O’Leary, daughter of Cork GAA hurler Seán O’Leary, and sister of Irish rugby scrum-half Tomás O’Leary, lead the initiative. The enterprise was "expected to transform Rusizi farmers into milk exporters to the DRC". The project fell under the Rwandan Ministry for Agriculture’s "Girinka" program, which means "give a cow". According to the agreement with the ministry, Bóthar held a 30% share based on its investment in the project for two to three years. At the end of that period, local farmers and investors would purchase this shareholding. The project’s launch coincided with the 20th anniversary of the Rwandan genocide. The creamery utilised cows formerly used for prisoner rehabilitation in Ireland, with local residents taught on the topics of animal husbandry and milk production. The project was the subject of a joint study by University College Dublin and Trinity College Dublin.

At the 2016 National Ploughing Championships, sporting personalities such as Marty Morrissey, John Heslin, T.J Reid, and John Hayes hosted an auction of heifers in support of Bóthar. Bóthar held a 25th anniversary airlift to Rwanda in 2016, in which Dublin GAA's two-in-a-row winning football manager, Jim Gavin, participated. They were greeted by then Rwandan Minister for Agriculture, Gerardine Mukeshimana, accompanied by a troupe of traditional dancers. In 2017, Bóthar sent its 1,000th heifer to an African country, as part of a shipment to Rwanda. Farmers from around Ireland, as well as former Tipperary GAA hurling manager and donor, Michael Ryan, were present at Roscrea Mart, Co. Tipperary, to mark the occasion.

Bóthar's network of regional supporters' groups in Ireland engage in fundraising and the sourcing of livestock on behalf of the charity (as of 2012, this included a group covering the Northern Ireland region). It has also been supported in its fundraising and animal sourcing initiatives by branches of Macra na Feirme, the Irish Cattle and Sheep Farmers' Association (ICSA), the Ulster Farmers' Union (UFU), the Young Farmers' Clubs of Ulster (YFCU), the Irish Farmers' Association (IFA), the Irish Creamery Milk Suppliers Association (ICMSA), as well as Catholic and Anglican clergy. Dairygold Co-operative Society donated funds, as well as dairy cows, sourced from suppliers, to Bóthar during the 1990s and 2000s. It also made a corporate donation of €100,000 in 2009. The Mullinahone Co-operative Dairy Society, Lakeland Dairies Co-operative Group, Glanbia Co-operative Society and North Cork Co-operative Creameries also supported Bóthar in the past. As part of an existing partnership with Bóthar, Kerrygold and the Irish Dairy Board launched an awareness campaign during the Christmas 2012 period on behalf of Bóthar, and created a campaign titled 'Moovin to Africa' in February 2013, in which the brand assisted in the sourcing of dairy cows.

=== Alleged misappropriation of funds by former CEO ===
In October 2020, the Charities Regulator appointed inspectors in to carry out a statutory investigation into the charity. In April 2021, Bóthar claimed before the High Court that former chief executive, David Moloney, misappropriated hundreds of thousands of euro donated to it for his own and his associate's personal use. The charity secured a temporary High Court injunction, whereby Moloney's assets were frozen. Bóthar claimed that an ongoing investigation into his conduct revealed that he was "guilty of an egregious breach of trust and an appalling dereliction of his duty to Bóthar and the beneficiaries of its charitable objects". Counsel for Bóthar said it was their case that Moloney did not co-operate with the investigations regarding the alleged misconduct. He was suspended from his role as CEO in November 2020, and resigned from his post in February 2021. Counsel said that as far as Bóthar were concerned, the resignation was an attempt by Moloney to prevent various matters from being uncovered. The judge granted Bóthar the temporary freezing order on an ex-parte basis. The judge, who also expressed concerns regarding the costs the charity would incur due to the litigation against Moloney, granted Bóthar permission to seek orders which required the defendant to provide a list of the full value or interest he held in any assets which he possessed. Bóthar was granted permission to seek an order requiring Moloney to provide details of funds donated to the charity that it was alleged he used for his own benefit or the benefit of third parties.

Also in April 2021, David Moloney admitted to misappropriating funds from the charity and concocting payments to the amount of an estimated €769,000. In a hearing before the High Court it was stated that this misappropriation occurred over the eight years he had been CEO and a period before that. Moloney admitted to misappropriating these funds along with the (by then deceased) Bóthar founder Peter Ireton. Ireton had been found dead at his home several weeks before the hearing. In the hearing, the High Court was told the funds had been obtained by falsifying donations to charity projects, with the recipients of these donations claiming they were never received. In one instance, Moloney admitted that a payment of €127,000 was made to an English company Agricultural Innovation Consultants Limited for a project in Rwanda had never been carried out. Moloney also admitted to fraudulently paying €100,000 of the charity's funds to one of his three pension funds and using €10,000 to purchase a hayshed on a farm he owns. The High Court was informed funds were also spent on providing staff cash bonuses of which the charity's board was not informed. Bóthar claimed that a high-profile event held in 2016 to mark the-then 25th anniversary of the organisation's foundation was used by Moloney to steal €37,200 from the charity.

In May 2021, Fianna Fáil TD John Lahart described the revelations as a "crushing blow" and, raising concerns of "corruption" within charities, stated that "we find ourselves back at the same point again, not due to the corporate outlook or objectives of an organisation, but because of the greed of a few". In response, Minister of State at the Department of Rural & Community Development, Joe O'Brien, stated that "the Charities Regulator has been engaging with Bóthar since early 2020 on foot of concerns which were raised about the charity. [..] As the Deputy may be aware, however, a criminal investigation is now under way into activities at Bóthar".

Gardaí contacted police in Britain regarding the allegations of fraud at the charity. Detectives with the Garda National Bureau of Fraud Investigations were expected to expand their inquiries into Africa and the UK for missing funds. As of May 2021, detectives with the Garda National Bureau of Fraud Investigations expected to expand their inquiries into Africa and the UK for missing funds as more allegations of fraud at the charity. In June 2021, it was reported that Heifer International, an affiliate organisation of Bóthar which is located in the US, was reviewing its partnership with Bóthar. Also in June 2021, Moloney applied for free legal aid to cover the legal expenses of the proceedings brought against him by the charity.

In July 2021, Bóthar made a High Court application to pursue a civil case against the estate of the late Peter Ireton, regarding the matter of allegedly stolen donor funds. In October 2021, Bóthar received High Court approval to pursue a claim against the estate of Ireton. Justice Senan Allen agreed to allow the charity to join the personal representative of Ireton’s estate in civil proceedings, where it sought to recover at least €1.1m it believed had been misappropriated.

=== Reorganisation & recent activity ===
Seeking to rebuild, the charity recruited new, unpaid, volunteer board members in January and February 2022, and, in May 2022, announced its opening for the recruitment of a new, permanent CEO. The charity remained active in projects in four countries during this period. In February 2022, it exported 22 in-calf dairy heifers to Kosovo, eastern Europe, having transported 54 in-calf dairy heifers and 130 goats in November and December 2021 respectively. The new CEO would be "tasked with carrying out a full analysis into past income at the charity" and would also have responsibility to ensure the organisation’s “financial integrity and accountability” through “sound controls and financial reporting”.

In July 2022, Chartered Accountants Ireland (CAI) reportedly opened an investigation into the company's long-time auditor, Grant Thornton. The investigation followed a complaint received by the professional body from one of its members and was said to be at an early stage. It is due to establish if there exists sufficient grounds to proceed to the disciplinary stage.

In June 2023, it sold its traditional headquarters in Limerick city for approximately €400,000. Following the publication of filed accounts in November 2023, Bóthar stated that “the complete change in leadership at board and CEO level has overseen the embedding of a robust set of financial controls and strong governance across the charity”. The board of directors declared that the organisation had gone through “a significant crisis,” but Bóthar was “in many ways a renewed organisation with vastly different ways of operating and with more positive change to come”.

In December 2023, the Offaly Express reported that Bóthar had sent a shipment of cows from donor farmers to a programme in Kosovo.

In May 2024, RTÉ News reported that Bóthar's goal was to achieve financial equilibrium by the end of 2024. In 2023, the financial statements revealed a reduction in losses by more than 50%, from €711,311 in 2022 to €282,824. The company's revenues saw a substantial 60% increase, reaching €768,695. The directors attributed this growth to the company's efforts in revamping its corporate governance systems, which resulted in a rise in legacy donations and gifts in kind. However, the revenue for 2023 fell far short of the pre-scandal revenue of €3.44m in 2020. The cumulative bill from previous years amounted to €1.3 million, however, the financial statements revealed no more extra expenses related to the incident in 2023. According to the Irish Independent, regarding the company's position as a going concern, a note in the submitted accounts indicated that the advancements made by Bóthar in 2022 and 2023 reflected an improvement towards complete compliance with company governance requirements, in particular those required by the Charities Regulator. It was stated that the procedure had positively affected Bóthar's reputation, culminating in the disposal of properties in Dublin and Limerick. The newspaper also reported that the directors further stated that the organisation had "re-emerged on an innovative and rejuvenated platform," after experiencing an unprecedented decline in operations during recent years, attributed to the suspected mismanagement of corporate resources by some preceding board members and a former CEO.

In July 2024, Bóthar launched its inaugural Fr. Felix Byrne Memorial Shipment of 60 donated calves and heifers to Kosovo. The Bóthar Wexford Supporters Group donated 31 in-calf heifers as part of the memorial. The recipients would participate in a structured 'Pass On' scheme, in which participating families would themselves donate the first female offspring from their herd to another selected family. The Bishop of Wexford, Fr. Gerard Nash, blessed the animals which comprised the Wexford grouping, prior to their departure.

== See also ==
- Heifer International
