= John Marnell =

Irish hurler

Personal information
- Native name: Seán Ó Mearnáil (Irish)
- Born: 1956 (age 69–70) Kilkenny, Ireland
- Occupation: Psychiatric nurse
- Height: 6 ft 0 in (183 cm)

Sport
- Sport: Hurling
- Position: Left corner-back
Club
- Years: Club
- Dicksboro
Club titles
- Kilkenny titles: 1
Inter-county
- Years: County
- 1975-1983: Kilkenny
Inter-county titles
- Leinster titles: 1
- All-Irelands: 1
- NHL: 0
- All Stars: 0

John Marnell (born 1956) is an Irish retired hurler who played as a left corner-back for the Kilkenny senior team.

Marnell joined the team during the 1975-76 National League and was a member of the team at various intervals for much of the next decade. An All-Ireland medalist in the minor, under-21 and junior grades, he won one All-Ireland winners' medal at senior level as a non-playing substitute.

At club level Marnell is a one-time county club championship medalist with played with Dicksboro.

Sporting positions
Preceded by Kevin Robinson	Kilkenny Minor Hurling Captain; 1974	Succeeded by Harry Ryan
