= 1944 Croke Cup =

Irish hurling competition

- Dates: 23 April 1944
- Teams: 2
- Champions: St Flannan's College (1st title)
- Runners-up: St Kieran's College

Tournament statistics
- Matches played: 1
- Goals scored: 8 (8 per match)
- Points scored: 8 (8 per match)
- Top scorer(s): M. Shaughnessy (3-00); J. Kenny (2-03)

The 1944 Croke Cup was the inaugural staging of the Croke Cup. While provincial championships had been played in both Leinster and Munster since 1918, this was the first time that the two champions faced each other in an All-Ireland series.

The final was played on 23 April 1944 at Thurles Sportsfield, between St Flannan's College and St Kieran's College, in what was their first ever meeting in the final. St Flannan's College won the match by 5–05 to 3–03 to claim their first ever Croke Cup title.

== Qualification ==
Province	Champions
Leinster	St Kieran's College
Munster	St Flannan's College

== Results ==
=== Final ===
23 April 1944 Final	St Flannan's College	5-05 - 3-03	St Kieran's College	Thurles Sportsfield
	M Shaughnessy 3-0, J Kenny 2-3, D O'Meara 0-1, M Maher 0-1.		R Cody 2-0, M Guckin 1-0, P McGrath 0-2, M Marnell 0-1.
