= St Brendan's Community School =

Secondary school in County Offaly, Ireland

Coordinates: 53.1049°N 7.9163°W

Information
- School type: Secondary school
- Established: 1980; 46 years ago
- Gender: Mixed
- Enrollment: 822 (2024)
- Website: stbrendanscsbirr.ie

St Brendan's Community School is a mixed-gender secondary school in the town of Birr, County Offaly in Ireland. As of 2024, the school had an enrollment of 822.

The school was opened in January 1980 following an amalgamation of the following schools that were in operation around the town: Presentation College (Oxmantown Mall), Mercy Sisters Convent (Wilmer Road) and the Vocational School (Green St). The school's hurling team has produced a number of hurlers (including Brian Whelahan) who have won All-Ireland titles at both club and county level.

The school's architecture has previously been compared to a "tractor shed".
