= 1987 All-Ireland Minor Hurling Championship =

All-Ireland Minor Hurling Championship 1987
Championship Details
- Dates: 23 April 1987 – 6 September 1987

All Ireland Champions
- Winners: Offaly (2nd win)
- Captain: Tomás Moylan
- Manager: Pad Joe Whelehan

All Ireland Runners-up
- Runners-up: Tipperary
- Captain: Michael O'Meara
- Manager: Paddy Doyle

Provincial Champions
- Munster: Tipperary
- Leinster: Offaly
- Ulster: Antrim
- Connacht: Not Played

Championship Statistics
- Top Scorer: Declan Pilkington (2-28)

The 1987 All-Ireland Minor Hurling Championship was the 57th staging of the All-Ireland Minor Hurling Championship since its establishment by the Gaelic Athletic Association in 1928.

Offaly entered the championship as the defending champions.

On 6 September 1987, Offaly won the championship following a 2-8 to 0-12 defeat of Tipperary in the All-Ireland final. This was their second All-Ireland title overall and their second title in-a-row.

Offaly's Declan Pilkington was the championship's top scorer with 2-28.

== Results ==
=== Leinster Minor Hurling Championship ===
Quarter-final

24 May 1987 Quarter-final	Kerry	0-02 - 3-17	Kilkenny	FitzGerald Stadium, Killarney
	B O'Mahony 0-1, P Regan 0-1.		L Byrne 2-1, J Walton 1-4, R O'Neill 0-3, B McGovern 0-3, T O'Grady 0-2, J Teehan 0-1, D Bradley 0-1, N Morrissey 0-1, J Cullen 0-1.

Semi-finals

27 June 1987 Semi-final	Kilkenny	2-20 - 3-10	Dublin	O'Moore Park, Portlaoise
	J Lawlor 2-2, B McGovern 0-5, J Walton 0-4, P O'Neill 0-2, P O'Grady 0-2, J Brennan (Erin's Own) 0-2, A Ronan 0-1, J Brennan (Fenians) 0-1, L Drennan 0-1.		R O'Doherty 0-5, J Sarsfields 1-1, M Curran 1-1, P Sweeney 1-0, V Murphy 0-2, S Flanagan 0-1.	Referee: A Maher (Laois)

4 July 1987 Semi-final	Offaly	3-16 - 2-09	Wexford	Nowlan Park, Kilkenny
	D Pilkington 0-8, T Moylan 1-3, J Troy 1-1, T Dooley 1-0, B Dooley 0-3, J Errity 0-1.		M O'Leary 0-4, S Quigley 1-0, R Callaghan 0-2, D Casey 0-1.

Final

2 August 1987 Final	Offaly	2-13 - 0-12	Kilkenny	Croke Park, Dublin
	D Pilkington 0-9, T Moylan 1-1, B Dooley 1-0, J Troy 0-1, T Dooley 0-1, J Pilkington 0-1.		A Ronan 0-4, J Brennan 0-4, J Lawlor 0-1, P O'Grady 0-1, B McGovern 0-1, J Walton 0-1.	Referee: N Byrne (Wicklow)

=== Munster Minor Hurling Championship ===
First round

23 April 1987 First round	Limerick	2-13 - 2-05	Waterford	Semple Stadium, Thurles
	R Walsh 0-5, A Fitzgerald 1-1, P Barrett 1-1, M Hickey 0-2, P Cronin 0-2, M Houlihan 0-1, P Heffernan 0-1.		M Kelly 1-2, P Prendergast 1-0, N Warren 0-1, D Henley 0-1, M O'Brien 0-1.	Referee: M Keane (Cork)

Semi-finals

19 May 1987 Semi-final	Cork	2-14 - 2-09	Clare	FitzGerald Park, Kilmallock
	B Cunningham 1-4, P O'Brien 1-2, T Hurley 0-3, D Quirke 0-2, M Sheehan 0-2, D Irwin 0-1.		P Jones 2-0, T Canny 0-3, B Foley 0-3, P Healy 0-1, M McNamara 0-1, D Considine 0-1.	Referee: W Barrett (Tipperary)

22 May 1987 Semi-final	Tipperary	3-12 - 3-06	Limerick	Semple Stadium, Thurles
	D Lyons 2-1, C Egan 1-4, J Leahy 0-3, C Bonnar 0-1, B Corcoran 0-1, M Perdue 0-1, B Hogan 0-1.		R Walsh 1-2, C Carey 1-1, M Houlihan 1-1, A Kirby 0-1, C Shields 0-1.	Referee: JJ Landers (Waterford)

Final

12 July 1987 Final	Tipperary	2-11 - 1-09	Cork	Semple Stadium, Thurles
	D Lyons 2-1, J Leahy 0-2, C Egan 0-2, S Bohan 0-2, K Ryan 0-2, M Ryan 0-1, B Hogan 0-1.		B Cunningham 1-4, G Healy 0-2, K Roche 0-1, J Dillon 0-1, D Quirke 0-1.	Referee: J Moore (Waterford)

=== All-Ireland Minor Hurling Championship ===
Semi-finals

9 August 1987 Semi-final	Galway	1-09 - 4-12	Tipperary	Croke Park, Dublin
	M Killilea 1-1, D Curley 0-4, G McGrath 0-2, R Burke 0-1, B Uniacke 0-1.		C Egan 2-4, J Leahy 0-6, S Bohane 1-0, D Lyons 1-0, B Hogan 0-1, C Bonnar 0-1.	Referee: P Long (Kilkenny)

16 August 1987 Semi-final	Offaly	4-17 - 1-04	Antrim	Dundalk
	D Pilkington 2-8, T Moylan 2-2, B Dooley 0-4, T Dooley 0-2, J Dooley 0-1.		S Elliott 1-1, J Graham 0-2, G O'Kane 0-1.	Referee: G Long (Tipperary)

Final

6 September 1987 Final	Offaly	2-08 - 0-12	Tipperary	Croke Park, Dublin
	S Morkan 1-1, J Troy 1-0, D Pilkington 0-3, B Dooley 0-2, A Cahill 0-1, T Moylan 0-1.		J Leahy 0-6, G Dealey 0-3, M Perdue 0-1, J Quinn 0-1, C Bonnar 0-1.	Referee: P Long (Kilkenny)

== Championship statistics ==
=== Top scorers ===
Top scorers overall

Rank	Player	Club	Tally	Total	Matches	Average
1	Declan Pilkington	Offaly	2-28	34	4	8.50
2	Tomás Moylan	Offaly	4-07	19	4	4.75
2	Ciarán Egan	Offaly	3-10	19	4	4.75
3	Donal Lyons	Tipperary	5-02	17	4	4.25
3	John Leahy	Tipperary	0-17	17	4	4.25

=== Miscellaneous ===
- The final of the Leinster Championship was delayed for several weeks as a result of damage to the Croke Park pitch during a U2 concert.
- Offaly retained the Leinster Championship title for the first and only time in their history.
