= CBC Kilkenny =

Secondary school school in Kilkenny, Ireland

Coordinates: 52.65311343°N 7.25687981°W

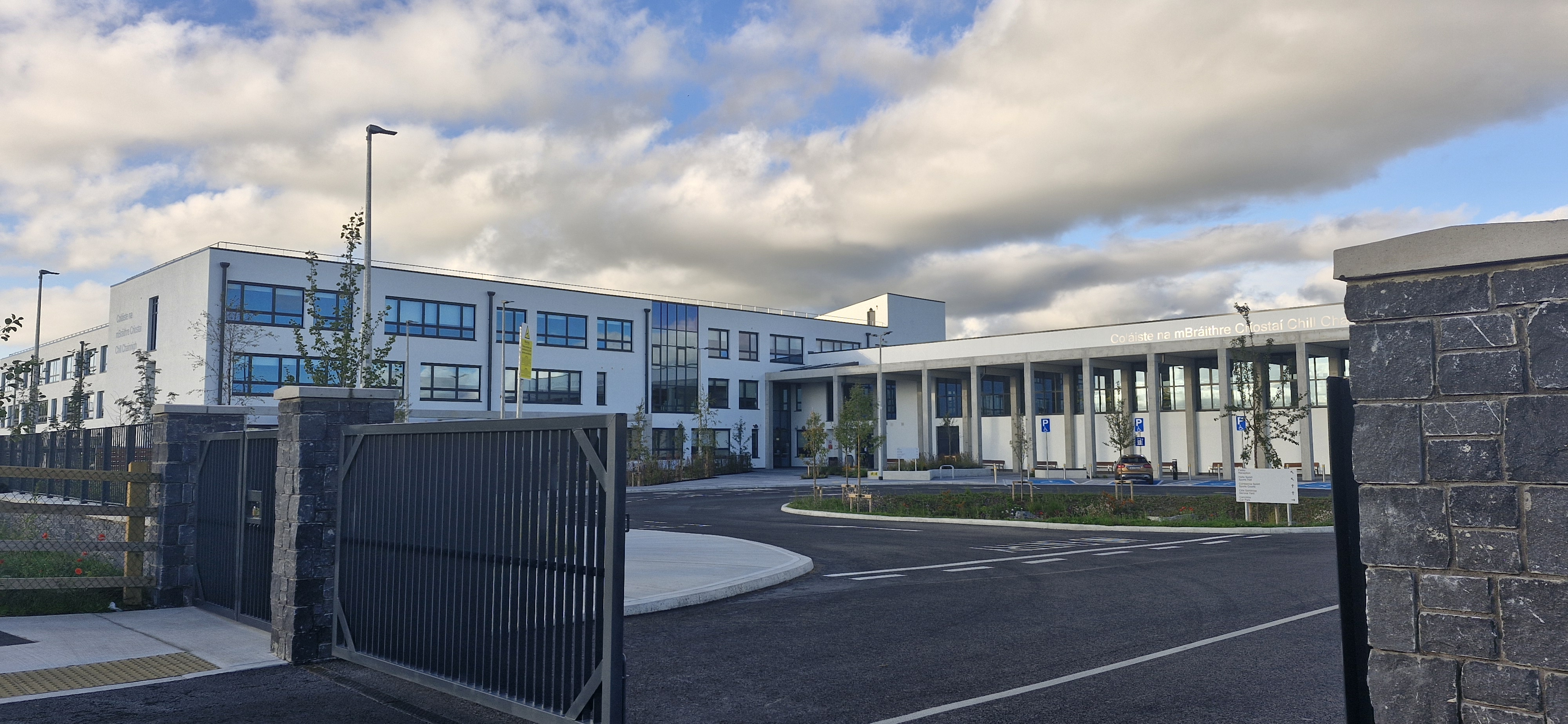

Location
- Dunningstown Road; Kilkenny, County Kilkenny, R95TW0Y; Ireland

Information
- Type: Secondary School (Public)
- Motto: Scientia ac Labore (Knowledge through Work)
- Religious affiliation: Roman Catholic
- Established: 1860; 166 years ago
- Founder: Edmund Ignatius Rice
- Principal: Tom Clarke
- Staff: Approx. 80
- Gender: Male
- Age: 12 to 19
- Enrolment: ca. 850
- Colours: Maroon and grey
- Sports: Hurling, Soccer, Basketball, Chess, Golf
- Website: cbckilkenny.ie

CBC Kilkenny (Irish: Meánscoil na mBráithre Criostaí) is an all-boys Roman Catholic school located in Kilkenny, Ireland. It has a strong sporting tradition in hurling, but also fields teams in many other sports. It is currently located on Dunningstown Road in Kilkenny.

== History ==
The Irish Christian Brothers came to Kilkenny in 1860. Five years before this, a meeting was held between the Chairmanship of the Lord Mayor, requested by the Bishop of Ossory. The assembly decided to raise funds to build the school and invited the Christian Brothers, led by Edmund Ignatius Rice to aid the cause. A fund of some £3,000 was collected and invested for the purpose. It was agreed that the Brothers would be sent to Kilkenny and be provided with furnished accommodation free of charge. The voluntary fee for students was levied at one penny, this money would be used only in the maintenance of the school. In 1860 a site was bought and a large building erected. The main part of this development still remains in full use up to this day and functions as the entrance to the newer highly renovated parts of the school. On 26 September 1860, it opened its doors to a large number of students; 260 boys were placed on the roll that day but many had to be excluded due to lack of space.

As of 2023, the school has more than 850 students enrolled. In August 2025, CBS Kilkenny changed its name to CBC Kilkenny as it moved to a new premises in Dunningstown road from the old premise in James's Street.

== Alumni ==
- John McGuinness (born 1955) - politician, Teachta Dála for Carlow-Kilkenny
- David Morris (born 1988) - professional snooker player
