= Leinster Colleges Senior Hurling Championship =

Hurling competition

Leinster GAA PPS Senior A Hurling Championship
- Irish: Craobh Iomána Iarbhunscoileanna Laighean
- Code: Hurling
- Founded: 1918; 108 years ago
- Region: Leinster (GAA)
- Trophy: Corn Uí Dhúill
- No. of teams: 9
- Title holders: St Kieran's College (59th title)
- First winner: Castleknock College
- Most titles: St Kieran's College (59 titles)
- Sponsors: Top Oil
- Official website: Official website

The Leinster GAA Post-Primary Schools Senior A Hurling Championship, is an annual inter-schools hurling competition organised by the Leinster Council of the Gaelic Athletic Association. It is the highest inter-schools hurling competition in the province of Leinster, and has been contested every year, except on two occasions, since 1918.

The final, usually held in February, serves as the culmination of a round robin and knockout series of games played between November and January. Eligible players must be under the age of 19.

The Leinster Colleges Championship is an integral part of the wider All-Ireland Colleges Championship. The winners and runners-up of the Leinster final, like their counterparts in the Conancht Championships and Munster, advance to the All-Ireland quarter-finals or semi-finals.

The title has been won at least once by 20 different schools, 10 of which have won the title more than once. The all-time record-holders are St Kieran's College, who have won the competition 58 times.

St Kieran's College are the current champions, having beaten Kilkenny CBS in the 2024 final.

== History ==
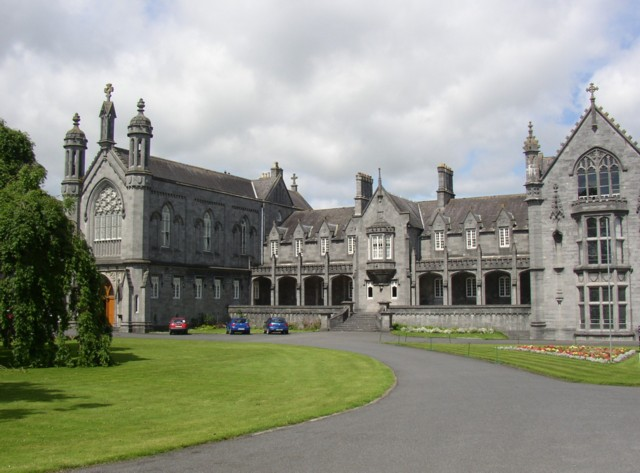
St Kieran's College

The Leinster Championship, like its counterpart in Munster, was organised for the first time in 1918. Participation was limited to voluntary secondary schools. Castleknock College, a school which later prohibited the playing of Gaelic games, claimed the title for the only time in their history with a 5–01 to no score defeat of O'Connell School in the final at Croke Park on 4 May 1918. No competition took place in 1919, however, following its resumption Offaly-based Cistercian College, Roscrea won four titles in five years from 1920 to 1924.

This period of dominance was short-lived, as St Kieran's College, after winning their inaugural title in 1922, went on to win 24 titles up to 1959. In spite of this dominance, a number of Dublin schools won their first of only titles during this period, including Colasite Caoimhin (1930), Blackrock College (1935), St Joseph's CBS, Fairview (1945) and O'Connell School (1946). Patrician College, Ballyfin became the first County Laois school to win the title in 1942, while Knockbeg College claimed County Carlow's only success in 1955.

St Peter's College, Wexford broke the St Kieran's College hegemony by winning five titles from seven finals appearances between 1960 and 1968. St Peter's College won further titles in 1973 and 1978, however, St Kieran's College and their Kilkenny rivals Kilkenny CBS claimed seven titles between them over the course of the rest of the decade. Offaly school St Brendan's Community School won four titles between 1979 and 1986, however, St Kieran's subsequently set the all-time record by winning eight Leinster titles in-a-row between 1987 and 1994. Their great run of success was brought to an end by Good Counsel College, Wexford, who won two titles in 1995 and 1997.

The turn of the century saw St Kieran's College continue to dominate by winning 12 titles between 2000 and 2019. By that stage, vocational schools were permitted to field teams in the competition after the merging of the vocational schools' and colleges' championships in 2013. A number of amalgamated teams also enjoyed success, with Dublin Colleges claiming titles in 2001 and 2008. The success of this team in promoting hurling in Dublin resulted in the eventual creation of a Dublin South and a Dublin North team, with the latter winning the Leinster title in 2018. Offaly Schools, a team made up of players from six different schools, won their first title in 2023.

== Current format ==
=== Participating teams ===
The following nine teams participated in the 2023 championship:

Team	Location	Colours
Coláiste Eoin	Booterstown	Yellow, white and black
Coláiste Mhuire	Johnstown	Blue and green
Dublin North Schools	North Dublin	Blue and white
Dublin South Schools	South Dublin	Navy and blue
Good Counsel College	New Ross	Blue and white
Kilkenny CBS	Kilkenny	Maroon and yellow
Offaly Schools	Offaly	Green, white and gold
St Kieran's College	Kilkenny	Black and white
St Peter's College	Wexford	Green and white

=== Championship ===
The championship begins with a group stage. The six individual colleges and schools are divided into two groups of three teams. Each team meets the others in the group once in a round-robin format. The two group winners and one of the group runners-up automatically qualify for the semi-final stages. The other group runners-up play the winners of the amalgamated group teams section, who play a knockout series of games to determine a winner.

=== Qualification for the All-Ireland Championship ===
As of 2005, the winners and runners up of the Leinster Championship qualify for the All-Ireland Colleges Championship. The runners-up qualify for the quarter-finals, while on some occasions the champions receive a bye to the semi-final stage, however, this is done in rotation with the Connacht and Munster champions.

== Sponsorship ==
Top Oil became the title sponsor of the championship in November 2016.

== Trophy and medals ==
The Corn Uí Dhúill is the current prize for winning the championship. The cup is held by the winning team until the following year's final. In accordance with GAA rules, the Connacht Council awards a set of gold medals to the championship winners.

== Roll of honour ==
#	Team	County	Won	Years won
1	St Kieran's College	Kilkenny	59	1922, 1925, 1926, 1927, 1928, 1929, 1931, 1932, 1933, 1937, 1938, 1939, 1940, 1941, 1943, 1944, 1948, 1949, 1950, 1951, 1953, 1957, 1958, 1959, 1961, 1965, 1966, 1969, 1971, 1972, 1974, 1975, 1977, 1984, 1987, 1988, 1989, 1990, 1991, 1992, 1993, 1994, 1996, 1999, 2000, 2002, 2003, 2004, 2005, 2010, 2011, 2012, 2015, 2016, 2017, 2019, 2024, 2025, 2026
2	Kilkenny CBS	Kilkenny	8	1936, 1970, 1976, 1981, 1983, 2006, 2013, 2014
2	St Peter's College	Wexford	8	1960, 1962, 1964, 1967, 1968, 1973, 1978, 1982
4	Cistercian College, Roscrea	Offaly	5	1920, 1921, 1923, 1924, 1947
5	Patrician College, Ballyfin	Laois	4	1942, 1952, 1956, 1963
5	Good Counsel College	Wexford	4	1995, 1997, 2009, 2022
7	St Brendan's Community School	Offaly	3	1980, 1985, 1986
8	Colasite Caoimhin	Dublin	2	1930, 1934
8	O'Connell School	Dublin	2	1946, 1954
8	Dublin Colleges	Dublin	2	2001, 2008
11	Castleknock College	Dublin	1	1918
11	Blackrock College	Dublin	1	1935
11	St Joseph's CBS	Dublin	1	1945
11	Knockbeg College	Carlow	1	1955
11	Presentation College Birr	Offaly	1	1979
11	Coláiste Éamann Rís	Kilkenny	1	1998
11	Castlecomer Community School	Kilkenny	1	2007
11	Dublin North	Dublin	1	2018
11	Coláiste Eoin	Dublin	1	2020

== List of finals ==
Year	Winners	Score	Runners-up	Score
1918	Castleknock College	5-01	O'Connell School	0-00
1919	No competition			
1920	Cistercian College	11-06	Belcamp College	0-00
1921	Cistercian College			
1922	St Kieran's College	w/o	Cistercian College	scr.
1923	Cistercian College	4-02	St Kieran's College	3-01
1924	Cistercian College	5-00	Blackrock College	4-02
1925	St Kieran's College	2-03	Blackrock College	2-02
1926	St Kieran's College	9-07	St Thomas's College	4-02
1927	St Kieran's College			
1928	St Kieran's College	7-09	Colasite Caoimhín	3-02
1929	St Kieran's College	10-03	Patrician College	0-00
1930	Colasite Caoimhín	4-01	St Kieran's College	1-01
1931	St Kieran's College	5-03	Colasite Caoimhín	0-03
1932	St Kieran's College	9-03	St. Enda's School	5-02
1933	St Kieran's College	11-03	Colasite Caoimhín	3-02
1934	Colasite Caoimhín	2-03	St Kieran's College	2-02
1935	Blackrock College	6-01	St Kieran's College	4-02
1936	Kilkenny CBS	3-04	Blackrock College	1-01
1937	St Kieran's College	4-08	Kilkenny CBS	2-01
1938	St Kieran's College	4-03	Colasite Caoimhín	0-04
1939	St Kieran's College	2-08	O'Connell School	0-03
1940	St Kieran's College	10-04	Knockbeg College	0-01
1941	St Kieran's College	4-03	O'Connell School	2-01
1942	Patrician College	1-02	St Joseph's CBS	1-00
1943	St Kieran's College	8-09	St Joseph's CBS	4-02
1944	St Kieran's College	4-04	St Joseph's CBS	2-02
1945	St Joseph's CBS	4-06	St Kieran's College	2-05
1946	O'Connell School	2-04	St Kieran's College	1-01
1947	Cistercian College	5-00	O'Connell School	1-01
1948	**St Kieran's College**	3-06	St Joseph's CBS	1-04
1949	St Kieran's College	5-05	St Joseph's CBS	1-01
1950	St Kieran's College	11-04	Cistercian College	2-01
1951	St Kieran's College	3-08	Patrician College	3-01
1952	Patrician College	6-07	Knockbeg College	5-00
1953	St Kieran's College	2-04	Cistercian College	1-04
1954	O'Connell School	3-07	Cistercian College	3-03
1955	Knockbeg College	7-08	St Joseph's CBS	4-05
1956	Patrician College	6-02	St Joseph's CBS	2-04
1957	**St Kieran's College**	6-03	Patrician College	3-00
1958	St Kieran's College	10-04	Cistercian College	3-04
1959	**St Kieran's College**	w/o		
1960	St Peter's College	2-10	St Kieran's College	3-06
1961	**St Kieran's College**	8-14	Patrician College	2-02
1962	**St Peter's College**	4-03	Kilkenny CBS	1-04
1963	Patrician College	4-04	St Kieran's College	3-05
1964	St Peter's College	3-05	Cistercian College	2-04
1965	**St Kieran's College**	4-05	St Peter's College	4-03
1966	St Kieran's College	3-10	St Peter's College	3-05
1967	**St Peter's College**	3-10	St Kieran's College	4-05
1968	**St Peter's College**	2-04	St Kieran's College	0-09
1969	St Kieran's College	3-07	Kilkenny CBS	4-03
1970	Kilkenny CBS	3-06	St Kieran's College	3-04
1971	**St Kieran's College**	2-15	St Peter's College	1-07
1972	St Kieran's College	7-10	Coláiste Éamann Rís	3-07
1973	**St Peter's College**	3-12	St Kieran's College	1-07
1974	St Kieran's College	5-11	St Peter's College	2-03
1975	**St Kieran's College**	6-12	Presentation College Birr	4-03
1976	Kilkenny CBS	1-12	Presentation College Birr	2-03
1977	St Kieran's College	4-06	St Peter's College	2-11
1978	St Peter's College	1-06	St Kieran's College	0-05
1979	Presentation College Birr	2-13	Kilkenny CBS	2-04
1980	St Brendan's Community School	4-03	St Peter's College	1-01
1981	**Kilkenny CBS**	1-08	St Brendan's Community School	1-07
1982	St Peter's College	1-08	Kilkenny CBS	0-08
1983	Kilkenny CBS	3-13	St Kieran's College	1-13
1984	St Kieran's College	3-06	St Brendan's Community School	2-04
1985	St Brendan's Community School	3-05	St Kieran's College	2-07
1986	**St Brendan's Community School**	5-06	St Kieran's College	0-06
1987	St Kieran's College	4-08	St Brendan's Community School	3-09
1988	**St Kieran's College**	8-17	St. Mary's CBS, Enniscorthy	1-06
1989	**St Kieran's College**	2-11	Birr Community School	1-09
1990	**St Kieran's College**	2-09	Kilkenny CBS	1-07
1991	St Kieran's College	0-11	Kilkenny CBS	0-06
1992	**St Kieran's College**	2-13	Coláiste Éamann Rís	2-02
1993	**St Kieran's College**	8-10	St Peter's College	2-05
1994	St Kieran's College	2-10	Good Counsel College	0-08
1995	Good Counsel College	0-11	St Kieran's College	1-06
1996	**St Kieran's College**	1-07	Good Counsel College	1-06
1997	Good Counsel College	2-11	St Kieran's College	0-14
1998	Coláiste Éamann Rís	1-10	St Kieran's College	0-09
1999	St Kieran's College	3-13	Dublin Colleges	1-11
2000	**St Kieran's College**	2-13	Dublin Colleges	1-10
2001	Dublin Colleges	1-09	Good Counsel College	1-06
2002	St Kieran's College	1-15	Kilkenny CBS	2-03
2003	**St Kieran's College**	3-10	St Peter's College	1-11
2004	**St Kieran's College**	0-13	St Peter's College	1-04
2005	St Kieran's College	1-19	St Brendan's Community School	1-12
2006	Kilkenny CBS	1-14	**Dublin Colleges**	2-09
2007	Castlecomer Community School	0-11	Kilkenny CBS	0-06
2008	Dublin Colleges	2-16	Kilkenny CBS	1-06
2009	Good Counsel College	1-13	Castlecomer Community School	2-08
2010	**St Kieran's College**	2-14	Kilkenny CBS	1-10
2011	**St Kieran's College**	3-07	Castlecomer Community School	0-07
2012	St Kieran's College	2-09	Kilkenny CBS	1-10
2013	Kilkenny CBS	2-09	St Kieran's College	1-07
2014	Kilkenny CBS	2-13	**St Kieran's College**	0-13
2015	**St Kieran's College**	1-14	St Peter's College	1-06
2016	**St Kieran's College**	2-12	Kilkenny CBS	1-11
2017	**St Kieran's College**	1-14	Kilkenny CBS	0-13
2018	**Dublin North**	1-14	St Kieran's College	1-11
2019	**St Kieran's College**	1-17	Coláiste Eoin	1-16
2020	Coláiste Eoin	1-16	St Kieran's College	0-17
2021	Cancelled due to the COVID-19 pandemic			
2022	Good Counsel College	1-23	Dublin South	0-14
2023	Offaly Schools	1-16	**St Kieran's College**	1-14
2024	**St Kieran's College**	2-21	Kilkenny CBS	0-05
2025	St Kieran's College	1-25 (3 pens.)	Kilkenny CBS	2-22 (0 pens.)

- Teams in **bold** went on to win the **Dr Croke Cup** in the same year.

== Records and statistics ==
=== Final ===
- Most wins: 59:
  - St Kieran's College (1922, 1925, 1926, 1927, 1928, 1929, 1931, 1932, 1933, 1937, 1938, 1939, 1940, 1941, 1943, 1944, 1948, 1949, 1950, 1951, 1953, 1957, 1958, 1959, 1961, 1965, 1966, 1969, 1971, 1972, 1974, 1975, 1977, 1984, 1987, 1988, 1989, 1990, 1991, 1992, 1993, 1994, 1996, 1999, 2000, 2002, 2003, 2004, 2005, 2010, 2011, 2012, 2015, 2016, 2017, 2019, 2024, 2025, 2026)
- Most consecutive wins: 8:
  - St Kieran's College (1987, 1988, 1989, 1990, 1991, 1992, 1993, 1994)

=== Teams ===
==== By decade ====
The most successful college of each decade, judged by number of championship titles, is as follows:

- 1920s: 6 for St Kieran's College (1922-25-26-27-28-29)
- 1930s: 6 for St Kieran's College (1931-32-33-37-38-39)
- 1940s: 6 for St Kieran's College (1940-41-43-44-48-49)
- 1950s: 6 for St Kieran's College (1950-51-53-57-58-59)
- 1960s: 5 for St Peter's College (1960-62-64-67-68)
- 1970s: 5 for St Kieran's College (1971-72-74-75-77)
- 1980s: 4 for St Kieran's College (1984-87-88-89)
- 1990s: 7 for St Kieran's College (1990-91-92-93-94-96-99)
- 2000s: 5 for St Kieran's College (2000-02-03-04-05)
- 2010s: 7 for St Kieran's College (2010-11-12-15-16-17-19)

==== Gaps ====
Longest gaps between successive championship titles:

- 34 years: Kilkenny CBS (1936-1970)
- 23 years: Cistercian College (1924-1947)
- 23 years: Kilkenny CBS (1983-2006)
- 13 years: Good Counsel College (2009-2022)
- 12 years: Good Counsel College (1997-2009)
- 10 years: Patrician College (1942-1952)

== See also ==
- Leinster Colleges Senior Football Championship

== Sources ==
- "Leinster Colleges Senior Hurling Championships". Leinster GAA. 3 May 2007. Archived from the original on 26 February 2011.
- Complete Roll of Honour on Kilkenny GAA bible
