= 2016 All-Ireland Under-21 Hurling Championship =

All-Ireland Under-21 Hurling Championship 2016
Championship Details
- Dates: 25 May 2016 - 10 September 2016
- Teams: 18

All Ireland Champions
- Winners: Waterford (2nd win)
- Captain: Patrick Curran & Adam Farrell
- Manager: Seán Power

All Ireland Runners-up
- Runners-up: Galway
- Captain: Brian Molloy
- Manager: Tony Ward

Provincial Champions
- Munster: Waterford
- Leinster: Dublin
- Ulster: Antrim
- Connacht: Not Played

Championship Statistics
- Matches Played: 17
- Total Goals: 59 (3.47 per game)
- Total Points: 516 (30.35 per game)
- Top Scorer: Patrick Curran (3-34)

The 2016 All-Ireland Under-21 Hurling Championship was the 53rd staging of the All-Ireland inter-county championship since its establishment by the Gaelic Athletic Association in 1964. The championship began on 25 May 2016 and ended on 10 September 2016.

Limerick entered the championship as the defending champions. They were beaten by Tipperary in the Munster semi-final.

On 10 September 2016 Waterford won the championship following a 5-15 to 0-14 defeat of Galway in the All-Ireland final. This was their second All-Ireland title and their first in 24 championship seasons.

== Format ==
Leinster, Munster and Ulster each organise a provincial under-21 championship. Connacht do not organise a provincial championship and are represented by Galway. The three provincial champions and Galway enter the All-Ireland semi-finals.

== New trophy ==
In September 2016 the GAA established a new trophy named The James Nowlan Cup to be presented to the All-Ireland under-21 hurling champions.

The old trophy, the Cross of Cashel, was retired after the 2015 final having been introduced in 1967.

== Provincial championships ==
=== Leinster Under-21 Hurling Championship ===
Quarter-finals

25 May 2016 Quarter-final	Westmeath	1-11 - 0-12	Kilkenny	Cusack Park, Mullingar
	D Clinton (0-8, eight frees), W Casserly (1-0), L Varley (0-1, free), K Doyle (0-1), C Doyle (0-1).	Report	J Walsh (0-6, six frees), B Ryan (0-3), S Morrissey (0-2), A Gaffney (0-1, ‘65’).	Referee: B O'Leary (Wexford)

25 May 2016 Quarter-final	Carlow	1-17 - 1-15	Laois	Netwatch Cullen Park, Carlow
	K McDonald (0-9, 8f), J Doyle (1-4), E Redmond (0-1), S Brennan (0-1), L Galway (0-1), O Roberts (0-1).	Report	M Kavanagh (1-9, 0-7f), L Bergin (0-1), R Mullaney (0-1), G Dunne (0-1), S Bergin (0-1), S Downey (0-1), E Fennelly (0-1).	Referee: K Jones

25 May 2016 Quarter-final	Kildare	1-12 - 5-22	Offaly	St. Conleth's Park, Newbridge
	C Dowling (1-2), B Byrne (0-5), R Casey 0-2 (one free), E Dempsey (0-1), C Egan (0-1), E O’Hehir (0-1).	Report	E Nolan 2-7 (four frees, one 65), O Kelly 3-1, P Guinan 0-3, D Murray 0-3 (two frees), R Hughes 0-3, C Kiely 0-2, A Cleary 0-1, D Wyer 0-1, C Freeman 0-1.	Referee: K Brady (Louth)

1 June 2016 Quarter-final	Wexford	1-8 - 2-12	Dublin	Innovate Wexford Park, Wexford
	C McDonald (1-5, 0-4 frees, 0-1, 65), P Foley (0-1), S Kelly (0-1), C Dunbar (0-1).	Report	S Treacy (1-3), S Ryan (1-1), J Malone (0-3), E Conroy (0-2), M McCallion (0-1), C O’Neill (0-1), C Bennett (0-1, 65).	Referee: P Burke (Kilkenny); Man of the Match: Sean Treacy (Cuala)

Semi-finals

15 June 2016 Semi-final	Dublin	2-17 - 1-14	Westmeath	Parnell Park, Dublin
	C Bennett 2-6, AJ Murphy 0-3, C Boland 0-3, S Ó Riain 0-2, P O'Dea 0-1, S Treacy 0-1, C O'Neill 0-1.	Report	C Doyle 1-7, D Clinton 0-3, N Mitchell 0-2, W Casserly 0-1, J Galvin 0-1.	Referee: B Redmond (Wexford)

23 June 2016 Semi-final	Carlow	1-13 - 5-16	Offaly	Netwatch Cullen Park, Carlow
	K McDonald 0-5fs, J Doyle 0-4, C Foley 1-1, D Wall 0-2, J Kelly 0-1.	Report	D Murray 0-8 (5fs, 1 ‘65’), O Kelly (0-1f), E Nolan (0-1f) 2-2 each, C Kiely 1-1, J O’Toole-Greene, D Wyer, R Hughes 0-1 each.	Referee: J Heffernan (Wexford)

Final

6 July 2016 Final	Offaly	1-10 - 2-15	Dublin	O'Connor Park, Tullamore
19:30	D Murray 0-5 4fs), O Kelly 1-0 pen, E Nolan 0-2, C Doughan (f) and L Langton 0-1 each.		S Treacy 2-2 (1f, 165), C Bennett (3fs, 165) and A Jamieson-Murphy 0-4 each, J Malone 0-2, C Mac Gabhann, R McBride & S O’Ríain 0-1 each.	Attendance: 4,709; Referee: A. Devine (Westmeath)

=== Munster Under-21 Hurling Championship ===
Quarter-final

28 June 2016 Quarter-final	Cork	2-15 - 3-19	Limerick	Páirc Uí Rinn, Cork
	S Kingston (1-6, 5 frees); M Coleman (1-2, 1 65, 1 free); P O'Callaghan (0-3); N Cashman, C Twomey, D Noonan, A Spillane (0-1).	Report	R Lynch (1-8, 6 frees, 1 65, 1 sideline); O O'Reilly (2-0); P Ryan (0-3); C Lynch, D O'Donovan, B Nash (0-2); P Casey, T Morrissey (0-1).	Attendance: 3,238; Referee: R McGann (Clare)

Semi-finals

13 July 2016 Semi-final	Waterford	3-23 - 1-11	Clare	Walsh Park, Waterford
7pm	P Curran (0-10, 6 frees, 1 65); Stephen Bennett (2-3); C Roche (1-1); M O'Brien, A Gleeson (1 sideline), M Kearney (0-2 each); T Devine, P Hogan, Shane Bennett (0-1 each).	Report	O Donnellan (1-0), D Conroy (0-3); K Hehir, B O'Gorman (0-2 each); S Gleeson, R Taylor, A Shanagher, B Duggan (free) (0-1 each).	Attendance: 4,126; Referee: F Horgan (Tipperary)

14 July 2016 Semi-final	Tipperary	2-12 - 1-13	Limerick	Semple Stadium, Thurles
	A Coffey 1-2, R Teehan 1-1, J Keane 0-4 (0-3f), C Lanigan, J Ryan 0-2 each, M Russell 0-1.	Report	R Lynch 0-9 (0-9 frees), D O’Donovan 1-0, B Nash, S Flanagan, P Ryan, T Morrissey 0-1 each.	Attendance: 4,020; Referee: C McAllister (Cork)

Final

27 July 2016 Final	Waterford	2-19 - 0-15	Tipperary	Walsh Park, Waterford
7pm	P Curran (0-8, 6fs, 1 65’), A Gleeson (0-5, 1f), Stephen Bennett (1-1), P Hogan (1-0), T Devine (0-2), DJ Foran (0-1), C Roche (0-1) M O’Brien (0-1),	Report	J Keane (0-6, 5fs), A Coffey (0-4), S Quirke (0-3), C Lanigan (0-1), R Teehan (0-1).	Attendance: 8,843; Referee: J Murphy (Limerick)

=== Ulster Under-21 Hurling Championship ===
Semi-finals

20 July 2016 Semi-final	Down	1-18 - 2-21	Antrim	McKenna Park, Ballycran
19:30	P McCrickard (0-9, 7f, 0-1 ‘65’), R McCusker (1-1), C Fitzsimons (0-2), C Taggart (0-1), M Fisher (0-1f), B Trainor (0-1), B Byers (0-1), O McManus (0-1), G Hughes (0-1).	Report	S McCaughan (1-8, 7f), J O’Connell (0-4), D Nugent (1-2), TT Butler (0-2), M Connolly (0-2), G Walsh (0-1f), A Delargy (0-1), R McKee (0-1).	Referee: A Nash (Derry)

20 July 2016 Semi-final	Armagh	1-10 - 3-19	Derry	St. Oliver Plunkett Park, Crossmaglen
19:30	C McAnallen (1-0 pen), D McCreesh (0-3, 0-1 free), P McKearney (0-2), J O’Connor (0-2), F Toal (0-2, 0-1 free), D McKenna (0-1).	Report	D Foley (0-9, 0-8 frees), C O’Doherty (1-3), B Cassidy (1-1), P McNeill (1-1), M McGuigan (0-2), T Magee (0-1), F O’Kane (0-1), F McGurk (0-1).

Final

27 July 2016 Final	Antrim	0-16 - 1-9	Derry	St. Patrick's Park, Loughguile
	S McCaughan 0-9 (all fs), M Connolly 0-3, G Walsh (f), A Delargy, C Ross and C McNaughton 0-1 each	Report	C O’Doherty 1-7 (6fs), G McCormac and D Foley 0-1 each.	Referee: A Ferguson (Fermanagh)

== All-Ireland Under-21 Hurling Championship ==
=== Semi-finals ===
20 August 2016 Semi-final	Waterford	5-25 - 1-8	Antrim	Semple Stadium, Thurles
16:00	P Curran 2-7 (0-4f), T Devine 1-2, Stephen Bennett 1-1, DJ Foran, M Kearney (0-1 sideline) 0-4 each, E McManus 1-0 (OG), A Gleeson 0-2, Shane Bennett, M O’Brien, A Farrell, P Hogan, J Fagan 0-1 each.	Report	S McCaughan 1-4 (0-3f), M Connolly 0-2 (1f), D Nugent, D McMullan (0-1f) 0-1 each.	Referee: D Hughes (Carlow)

20 August 2016 Semi-final	Galway	0-21 - 0-19 (AET)	Dublin	Semple Stadium, Thurles
18:00	B Molloy (0-10, 0-5 frees, 0-1 ’65); D Nevin (0-1 sc), T Monaghan (0-3 each); C Whelan, E Burke (0-2 each); D Dolan (0-1).	Report	C Bennett (0-3 frees), R McBride, C Boland (0-3 each); S Treacy (0-2 frees), A Jameson (0-2 each); J Madden, Ó Riain Broin, Mac Gabhann, Barrett, Conroy, McHugh (0-1 each).	Referee: D Kirwan (Cork)

=== Final ===
10 September 2016 Final	Waterford	5-15 - 0-14	Galway	Semple Stadium, Thurles
17:00	P Curran (1-9, 0-6f), Stephen Bennett (2-0), Shane Bennett (1-1), DJ Foran (1-0), M Kearney (0-2), A Gleeson (0-2, 1f), T Devine (0-1).	Report	B Molloy (0-6, 3f), E Burke (0-3), S Linnane (0-2), C Whelan (0-2), K McHugo (0-1).	Referee: S Cleere (Kilkenny)

== Statistics ==
Top Scorer Overall

Rank	Player	County	Tally	Total	Matches	Average
1	Patrick Curran	Waterford	3-34	43	4	10.75
2	Saul McCaughan	Antrim	2-21	27	3	9
3	Stephen Bennett	Waterford	6-05	23	4	5.75
3	Emmet Nolan	Offaly	4-11	23	3	7.66
5	Oisín Kelly	Offaly	6-03	21	3	7.00
6	Ronan Lynch	Limerick	1-17	20	2	10.00
7	Chris Bennett	Dublin	2-14	20	4	5.00
8	Seán Treacy	Dublin	3-08	17	4	4.25
9	Cormac O'Doherty	Derry	2-10	16	2	8.00
9	Brian Molloy	Galway	0-16	16	2	8.00
9	Dylan Murray	Offaly	0-16	16	3	5.33

Top Scorer In A Single Game

Rank	Player	County	Tally	Total	Opposition
1	Emmet Nolan	Offaly	2-07	13	Kildare
1	Patrick Curran	Waterford	2-07	13	Antrim
3	Chris Bennett	Dublin	2-06	12	Westmeath
3	Mark Kavanagh	Laois	1-09	12	Carlow
3	Patrick Curran	Waterford	1-09	12	Galway
6	Ronan Lynch	Limerick	1-08	11	Cork
6	Saul McCaughan	Antrim	1-08	11	Down
8	Oisín Kelly	Offaly	3-01	10	Kildare
8	Ciarán Doyle	Westmeath	1-07	10	Dublin
8	Cormac O'Doherty	Derry	1-07	10	Antrim
8	Patrick Curran	Waterford	0-10	10	Clare
8	Brian Molloy	Galway	0-10	10	Dublin

== Awards ==
Team of the Year

1. Jordan Henley
2. Conor Gleeson
3. Eoghan O'Donnell
4. Darragh Lyons
5. Micheál Harney
6. Austin Gleeson
7. Shane Barrett (Dublin)
8. Dan Nevin
9. Ronan Lynch
10. Shane Barrett (Waterford)
11. Brian Molloy
12. Andrew Coffey
13. Patrick Curran
14. Stephen Bennett
15. Niall Mitchell
