= Liam Blanchfield =

Irish hurler (born 1996)

Personal information
- Native name: Liam de Bluinsín (Irish)
- Born: 18 November 1996 (age 29) Bennettsbridge, County Kilkenny, Ireland
- Occupation: Student
- Height: 6 ft 2 in (188 cm)

Sport
- Sport: Hurling
- Position: Left wing-forward
Club*
Years	Club	Apps (scores)
2013-present	Bennettsbridge	9 (2-11)
Club titles
- Kilkenny titles: 0
College
- Years: College
- 2015-present: Dublin Institute of Technology
College titles
- Fitzgibbon titles: 0
Inter-county**
Years	County	Apps (scores)
2016-present	Kilkenny	16 (2-06)
Inter-county titles
- Leinster titles: 1
- All-Irelands: 0
- NHL: 1
- All Stars: 0
- * club appearances and scores correct as of 20:33, 12 December 2019. **Inter County team apps and scores correct as of 20:31, 12 December 2019.

Liam Blanchfield (born 18 November 1996) is an Irish hurler who plays for Kilkenny Senior Championship club Bennettsbridge and at inter-county level with the Kilkenny senior hurling team. He usually lines out as a left wing-forward.

== Playing career ==
=== St. Kieran's College ===
Blanchfield first came to prominence as a hurler with St. Kieran's College in Kilkenny. Having played in every grade as a hurler, he was eventually called up the college's senior team. On 9 March 2014, Blanchfield scored a point when St. Kieran's College suffered a 2–13 to 0–13 defeat by Kilkenny CBS in the Leinster final. On 5 April 2014, he was switched to centre-forward for the All-Ireland final against Kilkenny CBS and collected a winners' medal following the 2–16 to 0–13 victory.

On 28 February 2015, Blanchfield won a Leinster Championship medal when St. Kieran's College defeated St. Peter's College by 1–14 to 1–06 in the final. He was selected at right wing-forward by spent much of the game at centre-forward when St. Kieran's College faced Thurles CBS in the All-Ireland final. Blanchfield scored a point from play and collected a second successive All-Ireland medal following the 1–15 to 1–12 victory.

=== Bennettsbridge ===
Blanchfield joined the Bennettsbridge club at a young age and played in all grades at juvenile and underage levels and enjoyed championship success in the minor grade. He eventually joined the club's top adult team in the Kilkenny Junior Championship.

On 4 November 2012, Blanchfield was just 15-years-old when he lined out at right corner-forward when Bennettsbridge qualified for the Kilkenny Junior Championship final. He scored a point from play but ended on the losing side following a 3–12 to 0–10 defeat by Thomastown.

Bennettsbridge qualified for a second successive Kilkenny Junior Championship final on 20 October 2013, with Blanchfield lining out at right wing-forward. He scored a point from play in the 2–16 to 1–18 defeat by Lisdowney.

On 9 November 2014, Cleere won a Kilkenny Junior Championship medal after scoring 1-01 from right corner-forward in a 1–17 to 1–07 defeat of Mooncoin in the final. He retained his position at right corner-forward for the Leinster final on 6 December 2014 and ended the game with a winners' medal after the 1–20 to 0–03 defeat of Shamrocks. Bennettsbridge subsequently qualified for an All-Ireland final meeting with Fullen Gaels on 15 February 2015. Blanchfield collected a winners' medal after scoring 1-01 from play in the 2–17 to 2–14 victory.

On 18 October 2015, Blanchfield lined out in the forwards when Bennettsbridge drew 0–20 to 3–11 with St Patrick's Ballyragget in the Kilkenny Intermediate Championship final. He was again included on the starting fifteen for the replay on 24 October 2015 and collected a winners' medal after a 1–16 to 1–14 victory. Blanchfield won a Leinster Championship medal on 21 November 2015 after scoring two points from right corner-forward in a 1–14 to 0–13 defeat of Kiltale in the final. On 7 February 2016, he was again selected at right corner-forward for the All-Ireland final against Abbeyknockmoy. He ended the game with a winners' medal following the 1–17 to 1–14 victory.

On 28 October 2018, Blanchfield lined out at centre-forward when Bennettsbridge faced Ballyhale Shamrocks in the Kilkenny Senior Championship final. He scored a point from play but ended on the losing side following a 2–20 to 2–17 defeat.

=== Kilkenny ===
==== Minor and under-21 ====
Blanchfield first played for Kilkenny as a member of the minor team during the 2013 Leinster Championship. On 7 July 2013, he won a Leinster Championship medal after scoring two points from right wing-forward in Kilkenny's 1–18 to 0–08 defeat of Laois in the final.

On 6 July 2014, Blanchfield won a second successive Leinster Championship medal after scoring 2-03 from full-forward in Kilkenny's 2–19 to 2–10 defeat of Dublin in the final. On 7 September 2014, he was again at full-forward when Kilkenny faced Limerick in the All-Ireland final. Blanchfield ended the game with a winners' medal after scoring two points in the 2–17 to 0–19 victory.

Blanchfield progressed onto the Kilkenny under-21 team during the 2015 Leinster Championship. He made his first appearance for the team on 2 June 2015 when he lined out at left wing-forward in Kilkenny's 4–12 to 2–16 defeat of Dublin in the quarter-final. On 8 July 2015, Blanchfield was again at left wing-forward when Kilkenny suffered a 4–17 to 1–09 defeat by Wexford in the Leinster final.

On 5 July 2017, Blanchfield won a Leinster Championship medal after scoring a point from full-forward in 0–30 to 1–15 defeat of Wexford in the final. On 9 September 2017, he was again at full-forward for Kilkenny's 0–17 to 0–11 defeat by Limerick in the All-Ireland final.

==== Senior ====
Blanchfield was drafted onto the Kilkenny senior team during the 2016 National League. He made his first appearance for the team on 3 April 2016 when he lined out at right corner-forward in a 6–20 to 0–14 defeat of Offaly. Blanchfield made his Leinster Championship debut on 11 June 2016 when he came on as a 51st-minute substitute for Eoin Larkin in a 1–25 to 0–16 defeat of Dublin. On 3 July 2016, he was an unused substitute when Kilkenny defeated Galway by 1–26 to 0–22 to win the Leinster Championship. Blanchfield was back on the starting fifteen when he was selected at left corner-forward for the All-Ireland final against Tipperary on 4 September 2016. He was held scoreless throughout and ended the game on the losing side following a 2–29 to 2–20 defeat.

On 8 April 2018, Blanchfield was named on the substitutes' bench when Kilkenny faced Tipperary in the National League final. He was introduced as a substitute for Alan Murphy and collected a winners' medal following the 2–23 to 2–17 victory. Blanchfield was again selected on the substitutes' bench when Kilkenny faced Galway in the Leinster final on 1 July 2018. He came on as a substitute for Martin Keoghan in the 0-18 apiece draw. He again made an appearance as a substitute in the replay a week later, however, Kilkenny suffered a 1–28 to 3–15 defeat.

On 30 June 2019, Blanchfield was an unused substitute when Kilkenny suffered a 1–23 to 0–23 defeat by Wexford in the Leinster final. On 18 August 2019, he was again listed amongst the substitutes when Kilkenny faced Tipperary in the All-Ireland final. Blanchfield remained on the bench for the 3–25 to 0–20 defeat.

== Career statistics ==
As of match played 18 August 2019.

Team	Year	National League			Leinster		All-Ireland		Total	
Team	Year	Division	Apps	Score	Apps	Score	Apps	Score	Apps	Score
Kilkenny	2016	Division 1A	2	1-03	1	0-00	2	0-03	5	1-06
Kilkenny	2017	Division 1A	5	1-06	1	0-00	2	0-00	8	1-06
Kilkenny	2018	Division 1A	8	0-05	6	2-02	1	0-01	15	2-08
Kilkenny	2019	Division 1A	5	1-02	2	0-00	1	0-00	8	1-02
Total			20	3-16	10	2-02	6	0-04	36	5-22

== Honours ==
St. Kieran's College

- All-Ireland Colleges Senior Hurling Championship (2): 2014, 2015
- Leinster Colleges Senior Hurling Championship (1): 2015

Bennettsbridge

- All-Ireland Intermediate Club Hurling Championship (1): 2016
- Leinster Intermediate Club Hurling Championship (1): 2015
- Kilkenny Intermediate Hurling Championship (1): 2015
- All-Ireland Junior Club Hurling Championship (1): 2015
- Leinster Junior Club Hurling Championship (1): 2014
- Kilkenny Junior Hurling Championship (1): 2014
- Kilkenny Minor Hurling Championship (1): 2011

Kilkenny

- Leinster Senior Hurling Championship (1): 2016
- National Hurling League (1): 2018
- Leinster Under-21 Hurling Championship (1): 2017
- All-Ireland Minor Hurling Championship (1): 2014
- Leinster Minor Hurling Championship (2): 2013, 2014
