= 2014 All-Ireland Minor Hurling Championship =

All-Ireland Minor Hurling Championship 2014
Championship Details
- Dates: 9 April 2014 - 7 September 2014

All Ireland Champions
- Winners: Kilkenny (21st win)
- Captain: Darragh Joyce
- Manager: Pat Hoban

All Ireland Runners-up
- Runners-up: Limerick
- Captain: Cian Lynch
- Manager: Brian Ryan

Provincial Champions
- Munster: Limerick
- Leinster: Kilkenny
- Ulster: Antrim
- Connacht: Not Played

Championship Statistics
- Top Scorer: Alan Murphy (3-46)

The 2014 All-Ireland Minor Hurling Championship is the 84th staging of the All-Ireland hurling championship for players under the age of eighteen since its establishment by the Gaelic Athletic Association in 1928. The championship began on 9 April 2014 and will end on 7 September 2014.

Waterford were the defending champions, however, they were defeated in the All-Ireland semi-final.

Kilkenny won the title after a 2-17 to 0-19 win against Limerick in the final on 7 September at Croke Park.

Kilkenny's Alan Murphy was the championship's top scorer with 3-46.

== Results ==
=== Leinster Minor Hurling Championship ===
Round 1

12 April 2014 Tier 2	Carlow	1-08 - 1-16	Offaly	Dr. Cullen Park
15:00	K McDonald (0-5), C Nolan (1-1), A Kane (0-1), L Galway (0-1).	Report	C Kiely (0-8), E Cahill (1-1), R Hughes (0-4), P Guinan (0-1), O Kelly (0-1), J Fogarty (0-1).	Referee: G Quilty

12 April 2014 Tier 3	Kildare	3-11 - 1-13	Westmeath	St. Conleth's Park
15:00	E O'Hehir 1-6 (1-5fs); T Forde, C Melville 1-0 each; O Loughran 0-2 (2fs); E Doddy, N Kenny, M Gainey 0-1 each.	Report	D Egerton 1-0; D Clinton 0-3 (2fs); C Doyle (1f), N Mitchell 0-2 each; S Clavin, M Daly, W Casserly, P Scally, K Doyle, J Goonery 0-1 each.	Referee: K Brady (Louth)

12 April 2014 Tier 3	Meath	3-15 - 3-09	Wicklow	Páirc Tailteann
15:00	J Wall (0-7, 7 frees), M Slevin (1-1), C Kearney (1-0), A Walsh (1-0), Ross Ryan (0-3), C Bird (0-2, 65 and free), Ronan Ryan (0-1), L Carey (0-1).	Report	P O'Brien (0-8, 8 frees), S Germaine (1-0), P Doyle (1-0), T Mellon (1-0), B Moorehouse (0-1).	Referee: A Devine (Westmeath)

13 April 2014 Tier 2	Wexford	0-11 - 0-16	Dublin	Páirc Tailteann
15:00	J Firman (0-6), N Hughes (0-2), C Dunbar (0-1), D Pepper (0-1), S Kelly (0-1)	Report	S Grey (0-8), M Oliver (0-2), C Bennett (0-2), C Ó Ceallacháin (0-2), R McBride (0-1), D Burke (0-1).	Referee: P Burke

Round 2

26 April 2014 Round 2	Kildare	3-12 - 1-22	Carlow	St. Conleth's Park
15:00	E O'Hehir 0-10 (8fs, 2 '65's); C Melville 2-0, M Gainey 1-1, J Hill 0-1.	Report	K McDonald 0-10 (7fs), C Nolan 1-4, G Coady 0-3, D O'Neill, A Kane 0-2 each, O Roberts 0-1.

26 April 2014 Round 2	Meath	2-10 - 1-18	Wexford	Páirc Tailteann
15:00	C Bird (1-7, 1-3 frees, 0-1 penalty), Ross Ryan (1-0), J Wall (0-2, 2 frees), Ronan Ryan (0-1).	Report	J Firman (0-8, 6 frees), N Hughes (1-2), D Pepper (0-3), D Barden (0-2), K Poole (0-1), C O'Connor (0-1), N Rossiter (0-1).	Referee: M Murtagh (Westmeath)

Round 3

26 April 2014 Round 3	Offaly	3-14 - 0-26	Laois	O'Connor Park
	C Kiely (1-6, 1-4f, 1sl), E Cahill (1-4, 0-2f), J Fogarty (1-0), J Kilmartin (0-2), O Kelly (0-1), P Guinan (0-1).	Report	M Kavanagh (0-14, 8f), R Phelan (0-5), A Corby (0-3), A Dunphy (0-2), K Bergin (0-1), A Mortimer (0-1).

26 April 2014 Round 3	Kilkenny	0-03 - 2-08	Dublin	Nowlan Park
	A Murphy (0-2, 1f), S Morrissey (0-1).	Report	C O'Callaghan (1-2), C Bennett (1-1), M Oliver (0-2), R McBride (0-2), E McHugh (0-1).	Referee: B Redmond

Quarter-finals

10 May 2014 Quarter-final	Carlow	0-07 - 3-22	Kilkenny	Dr. Cullen Park
15:00	K McDonald (0-4f), C Nolan (0-2), O Roberts (0-1).	Report	A Murphy (2-9, 0-9f), S Morrissey (0-5), R Corcoran (0-4), D O'Connor (1-0), A Gaffney (0-1), L Blanchfield (0-1), J Walsh (0-1), E Kenny (0-1).	Referee: D Harrington

10 May 2014 Quarter-final	Wexford	0-18 - 1-09	Offaly	Wexford Park
15:00	J Coleman (0-7fs), D Pepper (0-3), D Barden (0-2), C Dunbar, S Kelly, M Joyce, J Firman, J O’Connor, K Poole (0-1 each).	Report	C Freeman (1-1), C Kiely (0-4, 2fs, 1 65), E Cahill (0-3, 1f), O Kelly (0-1).	Referee: R Byrne (Kilkenny)

Semi-finals

21 June 2014 Semi-final	Dublin	0-17 - 0-16	Wexford	Parnell Park
15:00	S Grey (0-7f), R McBride (0-3), E McHugh (0-2), E Ó Conghaile (0-2), C Bennett (0-1), C O'Callaghan (0-1), E Conroy (0-1).	Report	J Coleman (0-10f), D Pepper (0-2), N Rossiter (0-1), B Edwards (0-1), C Dunbar (0-1), S Kelly (0-1).	Referee: M O'Sullivan

21 June 2014 Semi-final	Laois	0-16 - 1-21	Kilkenny	O'Moore Park
17:30	M Kavanagh (0-9, 7f, 1'65), A Mortimer (0-2), A Dunphy (0-2), L O'Connell (0-1f), K Bergin (0-1), R Phelan (0-1).	Report	A Murphy (1-9, 0-7f), L Scanlon (0-3), S Morrissey (0-2), C Browne (0-2), L Blanchfield (0-2), R Corcoran (0-1), J Walsh (0-1), J Keoghan (0-1).	Referee: M Murtagh

Final

6 July 2014 Final	Dublin	2-10 - 2-19	Kilkenny	Croke Park
14:00	E Ó Conghaile 1-2, S Ryan 1-0, S Gray 0-3 (3f), C Bennett 0-2 (2f), R McBride, C O’Callaghan, E McHugh 0-1 each.	Report	L Blanchfield 2-3, A Murphy 0-9 (4f, 1 65), R Corcoran, S Morrissey 0-2 each, R Butler, C Browne, J Walsh 0-1 each.

=== Munster Minor Hurling Championship ===
Quarter-finals

9 April 2014 Quarter-final	Cork	5-26 - 0-09	Kerry	Páirc Uí Rinn
18:15	L Meade, E Keniry 2-4 each, D Lee 0-7, S Hayes 0-6 (5fs), T O'Connor 0-3, B Dunne 1-0, D Buckley, D Meaney 0-1 each.	Report	B Barrett 0-4fs, M O'Leary 0-2, R Collins, J Conway, A Murphy 0-1 each

9 April 2014 Quarter-final	Clare	0-11 - 1-13	Waterford	Cusack Park
18:30	A Shanagher 0-7 (5f, 0-1 65); I Galvin 0-2; M O’Shea 0-2.	Report	P Curran 0-7 (6f); E Meaney 1-1; P Hogan, S Ryan, E O’Halloran, S Bennett (f), D Lyons, 0-1 each.

10 April 2014 Quarter-final	Limerick	3-17 - 2-11	Tipperary	Gaelic Grounds
19:00	B Nash 2-2, C Lynch 1-3, C Ryan 0-6 (3f), R Lynch 0-4 (3f, 1 65), L Lyons & C Fitzgerald 0-1 each.	Report	A Coffey 1-2 (0-1f), P Ryan 1-2, S Hennessy 0-5 (4f, 1 65), T Nolan 0-2.

Playoffs

22 April 2014 Play-off	Clare	6-25 - 0-11	Kerry	Cusack Park
18:45	A Shanagher (3-6, 0-4f), C Corbett (1-5), I Galvin (0-6), M O'Shea (1-2), S Conway (1-0), M O'Malley (0-2), P McNamara (0-2), L O'Donovan (0-1), B Guilfoyle (0-1).	Report	B Barrett (0-9, 8f, 1'65), F Mackessy (0-1), J Brick (0-1)	Referee: P Kelly

30 April 2014 Play-off	Clare	1-23 - 0-12	Tipperary	Cusack Park
19:00	A Shanagher 1-13 (0-10f, 1-0 pen, 0-1 ’65); M O’Shea, I Galvin, B Guilfoyle 0-2 each; C Corbett, M O’Malley, J McCarthy (1f), S Conway 0-1 each.	Report	A Tynan 0-5 (3f), S Quirke 0-4, T Nolan, M Dunne, A Coffey 0-1 each.

Semi-finals

25 June 2014 Semi-final	Waterford	2-13 - 2-12	Clare	Fraher Field
19:30	P Curran 1-7 (4fs), S Bennett 1-2 (2fs), C Gleeson 0-2, A O'Sullivan, E Meaney 0-1 each	Report	A Shanagher 2-2 (1f), C Corbett 0-4 (3fs), M O'Malley, G Whyte, D Fitzgerald, J McCarthy, B Guilfoyle, I Galvin 0-1 each

26 June 2014 Semi-final	Limerick	0-23 - 2-15	Cork	Gaelic Grounds
19:30	C Ryan 0-7 (4f); T Morrissey 0-5; P Casey 0-3; R Lynch 0-3 (3f); S Flanagan 0-2; C Lynch, R Hanley, C Fitzgerald 0-1 each.	Report	S Kingston 1-3; D Lee 1-3; S Hayes 0-4 (3f); A O’Callaghan 0-3 (2f, 1 65); L Meade, J Looney 0-1 each.	Referee: P Foley (Waterford)

Finals

13 July 2014 Final	Waterford	2-17 - 3-14	Limerick	Páirc Uí Chaoimh
14:00	P Curran (0-7, 0-5 frees), S Bennett (0-4, 0-1 sideline cut, 0-1 free), C Curran, S Ryan (1-0) each, A Molumby, Peter Hogan, A O’Sullivan (0-2) each.	Report	R Lynch (0-6, 0-3 frees), P Casey (1-2), B Nash, T Morrissey (1-1) each, S Flanagan (0-2), C Lynch, E Doyle (0-1) each.	Referee: D Fox (Clare)

22 July 2014 Final replay	Waterford	0-18 - 0-24	Limerick	Semple Stadium
19:30	P Curran 0-8 (six frees), C Roche 0-4, E Meaney, S Ryan 0-2 each, C Curran, P Hogan 0-1 each.	Report	R Lynch 0-10 (five frees, three 65s), T Morrissey 0-5, P Casey, B Nash 0-3 each, C Ryan 0-2, R Hanley 0-1.	Referee: J McCormack (Tipperary)

=== Ulster Minor Hurling Championship ===
Quarter-final

31 May 2014 Quarter-final	Donegal	1-12 - 3-08	Derry	O'Donnell Park
	A McAuley 1-1, T Clare 0-4f, J O'Loughlin 0-3 (1f, 1 '65), Sam Doherty 0-2, O Rooney, E Lynch 0-1 each.		P Burke 0-5 (2f), S Quinn 1-1, J Grant, C Steele 1-0 each, F Burke 0-2f.

Semi-finals

29 June 2014 Semi-final	Armagh	2-11 - 3-11	Derry	St. Tiernach's Park
12:15	A Fox 1-6 (1-3f, 0-1 '65), J O'Connor 1-0, P McKearney 0-2, T Nevin, C Farrell and C Fox (free) 0-1 each.	Report	B Laverty 2-2, J McGlinchey 0-3, S O'Neill 1-1, P Burke (2 frees) and C O'Reilly 0-2 each, T Magee 0-1.	Referee: C Cunning

29 June 2014 Semi-final	Down	0-10 - 1-15	Antrim	St. Tiernach's Park
14:00	P Og McCrickard (0-9, 2f), J Murphy, O McManus 0-1 each.	Report	D Rocks (1-3), C McNaughton (0-6, 3f, 1pen), J Connolly (0-3), R Rooney, S Shannon, J McNaughton 0-1 each.	Referee: J McAndrew

Final

13 July 2014 Final	Antrim	0-17 - 0-09	Derry	Owenbeg
	C McNaughton (0-6, 4f), D Rocks (0-4), C McCaughan (0-2), J McCurry (0-2), R Rooney (0-1), J Carey (0-1), D McLaughlin (0-1)	Report	P Burke (0-3f), C Steele (0-2), C O'Reilly (0-2), E McGill (0-1), F McGurk (0-1).	Referee: J McAndrew

=== All-Ireland Minor Hurling Championship ===
Quarter-finals

27 July 2014 Quarter-final	Dublin	0-19 - 2-18	Waterford	Semple Stadium
	C Bennett 0-8 (6f), C O’Callaghan, T Fox, E O’Conghaile & S Gray (1 65), 0-2 each, R McBride, E McHugh & S Ryan 0-1 each.	Report	S Ryan 2-1, P Curran (3f) & S Bennett (1 sl) 0-4 each, C Curran & P Hogan 0-3 each, D Lyons 0-2, C Roche 0-1.	Referee: J Heffernan (Wexford)

27 July 2014 Quarter-final	Antrim	0-09 - 2-20	Galway	Kingspan Breffni Park
	C McNaughton (0-5f), J McNaughton (0-2), C McCaughan (0-1), J Carey (0-1).	Report	C Whelan (0-5), B Burke (0-4, 3f), J Mannion (1-0), J Grealish (1-0) D Mangan (0-3), J Holland (0-2, 1f, 1'65), K McHugo (0-2), D Nevin (0-2), J Mooney (0-1), C Shaughnessy (0-1).	Referee: D Hughes

Semi-finals

10 August 2014 Semi-final	Kilkenny	1-23 - 1-14 (aet)	Waterford	Croke Park
13:30	A Murphy 0-11 (0-3 65, 0-7 f), J Walsh 1-1, L Blanchfield 0-5, S Morrissey 0-2, R Corcoran 0-2, C Browne 0-1, B Ryan 0-1.	Report	P Curran 0-6 (0-5f), S Bennett 1-0, A Molumby 0-3, C Curran 0-2, S Ryan 0-1, C Roche 0-1, E Meaney 0-1.	Referee: J Keenan (Wicklow)

17 August 2014 Semi-final	Limerick	1-27 - 2-09	Galway	Croke Park
13:30	R Lynch 0-13 (10f), B Nash 1-3, T Morrissey 0-3, P Casey 0-2, S Flanagan 0-2, C Fitzgerald 0-1, R Hanley 0-1, C Lynch 0-1, B Murphy 0-1	Report	C Whelan 2-0, B Burke 0-4 (3f), J Grealish 0-2, D Nevin 0-2, C Shaughnessy 0-1	Referee: C Lyons (Cork)

Final

7 September 2014 Final	Kilkenny	2-17 - 0-19	Limerick	Croke Park
13:30	J Walsh 2-5, A Murphy 0-6 (0-6f), R Corcoran 0-3, L Blanchfield 0-2, L Scanlon 0-1	Report	R Lynch 0-9 (0-7f, 0-1 65), C Lynch 0-3, T Morrissey 0-2, B Nash 0-2, S Flanagan 0-2, B Murphy 0-1	Referee: F Horgan (Tipperary)

== Championship statistics ==
=== Scoring ===
- First goal of the championship: Eoghan Keniry for Cork against Kerry (Munster quarter-final, 9 April 2014)

=== Miscellaneous ===
- Kilkenny's score of just 0-3 against Dublin in their Leinster championship meeting is their lowest tally ever in a championship game.

== Championship statistics ==
=== Top scorers ===
Top scorers overall

Rank	Player	County	Tally	Total	Matches	Average
1	Alan Murphy	Kilkenny	3-46	55	6	9.16
2	Aron Shanagher	Clare	6-28	46	4	11.50
3	Ronan Lynch	Limerick	0-45	45	6	7.50
4	Patrick Curran	Waterford	1-39	42	6	7.00
5	Mark Kavanagh	Laois	0-23	23	3	7.66
6	Barry Nash	Limerick	4-09	21	5	4.20
6	Cillian Kiely	Offaly	1-18	21	3	7.00
7	Seán Gray	Dublin	0-20	20	4	5.00
8	Liam Blanchfield	Kilkenny	2-11	17	5	3.40
8	Eoin O'Hehir	Kildare	1-16	19	2	9.50
8	Kevin McDonald	Carlow	0-19	19	3	6.33

Top scorers in a single game

Rank	Player	County	Tally	Total	Opposition
1	Aron Shanagher	Clare	1-13	16	Tipperary
2	Aron Shanagher	Clare	3-06	15	Kerry
2	Alan Murphy	Kilkenny	2-09	15	Carlow
3	Mark Kavanagh	Laois	0-14	14	Offaly
4	Ronan Lynch	Limerick	0-13	13	Galway
5	Alan Murphy	Kilkenny	1-09	12	Laois
6	John Walsh	Kilkenny	2-05	11	Limerick
6	Alan Murphy	Kilkenny	0-11	11	Waterford
7	Luke Meade	Cork	2-04	10	Kerry
7	Eoghan Keniry	Cork	2-04	10	Kerry
7	Patrick Curran	Waterford	1-07	10	Clare
7	Charlie Bird	Meath	1-07	10	Wexford
7	Eoin O'Hehir	Kildare	0-10	10	Carlow
7	Kevin McDonald	Carlow	0-10	10	Kildare
7	Joe Coleman	Wexford	0-10	10	Dublin
7	Ronan Lynch	Limerick	0-10	10	Waterford
