= Austin Gleeson =

Irish hurler

Personal information
- Native name: Áistín Ó Gliasáin (Irish)
- Nickname: Aussie
- Born: 27 June 1995 (age 31) Waterford, Ireland
- Occupation: Engineer
- Height: 1.89 m (6 ft 2 in)

Sport
- Sport: Hurling
- Position: Centre-forward
Club
- Years: Club
- 2012–present: Mount Sion
Club titles
- Waterford titles: 0
College
- Years: College
- 2013-2019: Waterford Institute of Technology
College titles
- Fitzgibbon titles: 0
Inter-county*
Years	County	Apps (scores)
2014–2026	Waterford	39 (4-101)
Inter-county titles
- Munster titles: 0
- All-Irelands: 0
- NHL: 1
- All Stars: 1
- *Inter County team apps and scores correct as of 18:30, 23 April 2023.

Austin Gleeson (born 27 June 1995) is an Irish hurler who plays for Waterford Senior Championship club Mount Sion, and previously at inter-county level with the Waterford senior hurling team. He usually lines out as a centre-forward but can also be deployed as a centre-back. He is one of two hurlers to ever win young hurler of the year and hurler of the year in the same year, with him winning the honours at the age of 21 in 2016. He is the younger brother of Jessica Gleeson, the Republic of Ireland women's national team soccer player.

== Playing career ==
=== De La Salle College ===
Gleeson first came to prominence as a hurler with De La Salle College. He played in every grade of hurling before eventually joining the college's senior hurling team and lined out in several Harty Cup campaigns.

=== Waterford Institute of Technology ===
As a student at the Waterford Institute of Technology, Gleeson joined the senior hurling team during his second year. On 1 March 2015, he was selected at left wing-forward when WIT faced the University of Limerick in the Fitzgibbon Cup final. Gleeson spent much of the game at full-forward and score a point from a sideline cut in the 0–21 to 3–12 draw. He retained his position for the replay on 11 March but was forced off with a hamstring injury after just four minutes in the 2–18 to 1–14 defeat.

=== Mount Sion ===
Gleeson joined the Mount Sion club when he was 8-year-old and played in all grades at juvenile and underage levels, winning championship medals in the under-14 and under-16 grades. He made his first appearance for the club's senior team during the 2012 Waterford Championship

On 5 October 2014, Gleeson lined out at centre-back when Mount Sion faced Ballygunner in the Waterford Senior Championship final. He ended the game on the sideline after receiving two yellow cards in the 2–16 to 0–09 defeat.

=== Waterford ===
==== Minor and under-21 ====
Gleeson first lined out for Waterford as a member of the minor team during the 2012 Munster Championship. He made his first appearance for the team on 2 May when he was introduced as a 45th-minute substitute in a 1–20 to 3–13 defeat of Clare.

Gleeson was again eligible for the minor grade in 2013 and joined the starting fifteen as a centre-back. On 14 July, he scored 0-03, including two frees, in a 2-19 apiece draw with Limerick in the Munster final. Gleeson retained his position at centre-back for the replay on 23 July, however, he ended on the losing side following a 1–20 to 4–08 defeat. On 8 September, he scored a point from a free when Waterford defeated Galway by 1–21 to 0–16 in the All-Ireland final.

Gleeson joined the Waterford under-21 team in advance of the 2014 Munster Championship. He made his first appearance for the team on 16 July 2014 and top scored for Waterford with 0–07 in a 3–18 to 0–16 defeat by Cork.

After a disappointing 2015 Munster Championship, Gleeson was selected for the under-21 team for a third successive season in 2016. On 27 July, he scored 0-05 from centre-back and claimed the man of the match award after a 2–19 to 0–15 defeat of Tipperary in the Munster final. On 10 September, Gleeson won an All-Ireland medal after scoring 0-02 from centre-back in a 5–15 to 0–14 defeat of Galway in the final. He ended the season by being named in the centre-back position on the Team of the Year.

==== Senior ====
Gleeson was added to the Waterford senior panel prior to the start of the 2014 National League. He made his first appearance for the team on 23 March 2014 when he lined out at left corner-forward in a 4–22 to 0–14 defeat by Kilkenny. Gleeson made his Munster Championship debut on 25 May 2014 when he scored 1-02 from left wing-forward in a 1-21 apiece draw with Cork.

On 3 May 2015, Gleeson was named at centre-back but played much of the game at right wing-back when Waterford faced Cork in the National League final. He scored 0-02 and collected a winners' medal following the 1–24 to 0–17 victory. On 12 July 2015, Gleeson scored 0-02 from right wing-back when Waterford were beaten for the fourth time in six seasons by Tipperary in the Munster final. He ended the season by being nominated for an All-Star.

On 1 May 2016, Gleeson was at centre-back when Waterford lined out in the National League final. He scored 0–02 before being substituted in the 63rd minute as Waterford drew 0-22 apiece with Clare. Gleeson switched to centre-forward and scored 0–03 in the replay, which Waterford lost by 1–23 to 2–19. On 10 July, he scored 0-02 from left corner-forward when Waterford suffered a 5–19 to 0–13 defeat by Tipperary in the Munster final. Gleeson ended the season by becoming only the second player ever to win the Hurler of the Year and Young Hurler of the Year awards in the same year. He also claimed the centre-forward berth on the All-Star team.

On 3 September 2017, Gleeson was named at centre-forward when Waterford faced Galway in the All-Ireland final. He ended the game as a runner-up following Galway's 0–26 to 2–17 victory. Gleeson ended the season by securing a third successive All-Star nomination.

Gleeson's 2018 season was blighted by a series of injuries. A pulled quad hampered him during the early rounds of the National League while he also suffered an infected cut on his ankle. Just before the start of the Munster Championship he sustained a hamstring injury after playing just 14 minutes of a club game with Mount Sion.

On 31 March 2019, Gleeson was named at midfield but lined out at centre-forward when Waterford faced Limerick in the National League final. He scored 0-02, including a point from a sideline, in the 1–24 to 0–19 defeat.

On 18 September 2026, Gleeson announced his retirement from inter-county hurling.

== Career statistics ==
As of match played 23 April 2023.

Team	Year	National League			Munster		All-Ireland		Total	
Team	Year	Division	Apps	Score	Apps	Score	Apps	Score	Apps	Score
Waterford	2014	Division 1A	3	1-01	2	1-05	2	0-04	7	2-10
Waterford	2015	Division 1B	7	0-10	2	0-03	2	0-07	11	0-20
Waterford	2016	Division 1A	9	0-19	2	0-08	3	1-09	14	1-36
Waterford	2017	Division 1A	5	0-07	1	0-02	5	1-16	11	1-25
Waterford	2018	Division 1A	5	0-07	3	0-01	—		8	0-08
Waterford	2019	Division 1B	6	0-08	3	0-05	—		9	0-13
Waterford	2020	Division 1A	2	0-01	2	0-06	2	0-06	6	0-13
Waterford	2021	Division 1 Group A			1	0-04	4	1-12	5	1-16
Waterford	2022	Division 1 Group B			4	0-12			4	0-12
Waterford	2023	Division 1 Group B			1	0-01			1	0-01
Total			37	1-53	21	1-47	18	3-54	76	4-154

== Honours ==
Mount Sion

- Waterford Junior Football Championship (2): 2018, 2021

Waterford

- National Hurling League (1): 2015
- All-Ireland Under-21 Hurling Championship (1): 2016
- Munster Under-21 Hurling Championship (1): 2016
- All-Ireland Minor Hurling Championship (1): 2013

Awards

- All Stars Hurler of the Year (1): 2016
- All Stars Young Hurler of the Year (1): 2016
- GAA GPA All Stars Awards (1): 2016

Awards
Preceded by Tadhg de Búrca	GAA-GPA All-Star Young Hurler of the Year; 2016	Succeeded by Conor Whelan
Preceded by T. J. Reid	GAA-GPA All-Star Hurler of the Year; 2016	Succeeded by Joe Canning
