= Chris Bennett (hurler) =

Irish hurler

Personal information
- Native name: Criostóir Mac Beinéid (Irish)
- Born: 1996 (age 29–30) Templeogue, Dublin, Ireland
- Occupation: Commercial underwriter

Sport
- Sport: Hurling
- Position: Centre-forward
Club
- Years: Club
- Faughs
Club titles
- Dublin titles: 0
Inter-county*
Years	County	Apps (scores)
2015-2017	Dublin	3 (0-05)
Inter-county titles
- Leinster titles: 0
- All-Irelands: 0
- NHL: 0
- All Stars: 0
- *Inter County team apps and scores correct as of 16:45, 9 July 2021.

Christopher Bennett (born 1996) is an Irish hurler who plays for Dublin Senior Championship club Faughs. He is a former member of the Dublin senior hurling team, with whom he usually lined out as a forward.

== Career ==
A member of the Faughs club in Templeogue, Bennett first came to prominence on the inter-county scene during a three-year tenure with the Dublin minor team. An All-Ireland runner-up in this grade, he later won a Leinster Under-21 Championship medal with the Dublin under-21 team. Bennett was straight out of the minor grade when he was drafted onto the Dublin senior hurling team in 2015. His three-year senior career saw him win a Walsh Cup title.

== Honours ==
Dublin

- Walsh Cup: 2016
- Leinster Under-21 Hurling Championship: 2016
- Leinster Minor Hurling Championship: 2012
