= 2016 All-Ireland Under-21 Hurling Championship final =

2016 All-Ireland Under-21 Hurling Championship Final
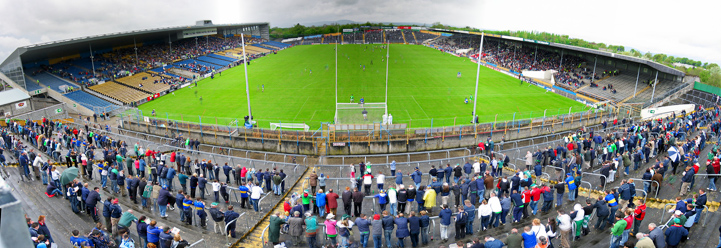
- Event: 2016 All-Ireland Under-21 Hurling Championship
Waterford	Galway
5-15	0-14
- Date: 10 September 2016
- Venue: Semple Stadium, Thurles
- Man of the Match: Patrick Curran
- Referee: Seán Cleere (Kilkenny)
- Attendance: 14,410

The 2016 All-Ireland Under-21 Hurling Championship final was a hurling match that was played at Semple Stadium, Thurles on 10 September 2016 to determine the winners of the 2016 All-Ireland Under-21 Hurling Championship, the 54th season of the All-Ireland Under-21 Hurling Championship, a tournament organised by the Gaelic Athletic Association for the champion teams of the four provinces of Ireland. The final was contested by Waterford of Munster and Galway of Connacht, with Waterford winning by 5-15 to 0-14.

The All-Ireland final between Waterford and Galway was the first ever championship meeting between the two teams. Waterford were appearing in their third ever final, while Galway were lining out in their 11th All-Ireland decider.

Waterford's D. J. Foran opened the scoring with a goal in the opening minutes, however, Galway clawed back to within two points by the tenth minute. In spite of this, Waterford soon pulled ahead. Patrick Curran scored a second Waterford goal in the 12th minute and Waterford were 2-03 to 0-03 clear. Two minutes later, a handpass from Curran picked out Stephen Bennett and while goalkeeper Cathal Tuohy got a stick to his shot, the sliotar flew into the net. Tuohy denied Waterford a fourth goal of the first half when he flicked Tom Devine's shot over the crossbar. At half time, Waterford were 3-10 to 0-6 clear and the game looked over.

Galway scored five points without reply after the restart to narrow the deficit, however, it was as close as they got to Waterford. Shane Bennett's 49th-minute goal seemed to kill off any hope of a Galway revival. Stephen Bennett's second goal in the closing stages capped the win.

Waterford's All-Ireland victory was their first since 1992. The win gave them their second All-Ireland title over all and put them in seventh position on the all-time roll of honour.

== Match ==
=== Details ===
10 September 2016
17:00

Waterford	5-15 - 0-14	Galway
P Curran 1-9 (0-6f), S Bennett 2-0, S Bennett 1-1, DJ Foran 1-0, M Kearney, A Gleeson (0-1f) 0-2 each, T Devine 0-1.	Report	B Molloy 0-6 (0-3f), É Burke 0-3, S Linnane, C Whelan 0-2 each, K McHugo 0-1.

Semple Stadium, Thurles
Referee: S Cleere (Waterford)

Waterford	Galway
