= Thomas Devine =

Thomas or Tom Devine may refer to:

- Sir Tom Devine (born 1945), Scottish historian
- Tom Devine (lawyer) (born 1951), American lawyer, lobbyist, and advocate for whistleblower rights
- Tad Devine (Thomas A. Devine, born 1955), American political consultant
- Tom Devine (hurler) (born 1995), Irish hurler
