= Seán Treacy (Dublin hurler) =

Irish hurler

Personal information
- Native name: Seán Ó Treasaigh (Irish)
- Born: 1995 (age 30–31) Dalkey, Dublin, Ireland
- Occupation: Secondary school teacher

Sport
- Sport: Hurling
- Position: Centre-forward
Club
- Years: Club
- Cuala
Club titles
- Dublin titles: 5
- Leinster titles: 2
- All-Ireland Titles: 2
College
- Years: College
- 2014-2018; 2019-2021: University College Dublin
College titles
- Fitzgibbon titles: 0
Inter-county*
Years	County	Apps (scores)
2012-2019	Dublin	3 (0-05)
Inter-county titles
- Leinster titles: 0
- All-Irelands: 0
- NHL: 0
- All Stars: 0
- *Inter County team apps and scores correct as of 16:45, 9 July 2021.

Seán Treacy (born 1996) is an Irish hurler who plays for Dublin Senior Championship club Cuala. He is a former member of the Dublin senior hurling team, with whom he usually lined out as a forward.

== Career ==
Treacy first came to prominence at club level during a golden age for the Cuala club. He lined out in the forwards and at midfield when the club won consecutive All-Ireland Club Championship titles in 2017 and 2018. He has also won two Leinster Club Championship titles. At inter-county level, Treacy was an All-Ireland runner-up with the Dublin minor team in 2012, before winning a Leinster Under-21 Championship medal with the Dublin under-21 team in 2016. Treacy was drafted onto the Dublin senior hurling team in 2016 and lined out at several times until 2019. His brother, David Treacy, aloso played with Dublin.

== Honours ==
Cuala

- All-Ireland Senior Club Hurling Championship: 2017, 2018
- Leinster Senior Club Hurling Championship: 2016, 2017
- Dublin Senior Hurling Championship: 2015, 2016, 2017, 2019, 2020

Dublin

- Walsh Cup: 2016
- Leinster Under-21 Hurling Championship: 2016
- Leinster Minor Hurling Championship: 2012
