= Alan Murphy (hurler) =

Irish hurler (born 1996)

Personal information
- Native name: Ailéin Ó Murchú (Irish)
- Born: 12 June 1996 (age 30) Glenmore, County Kilkenny, Ireland
- Occupation: Student
- Height: 6 ft 1 in (185 cm)

Sport
- Sport: Hurling
- Position: Right wing-forward
Club
- Years: Club
- Glenmore
Club titles
- Limerick titles: 0
College
- Years: College
- 2014-present: University of Limerick
College titles
- Fitzgibbon titles: 0
Inter-county*
Years	County	Apps (scores)
2017-present	Kilkenny	9 (0-11)
Inter-county titles
- Munster titles: 4
- All-Irelands: 0
- NHL: 1
- All Stars: 0
- *Inter County team apps and scores correct as of 22:31, 17 July 2021.

Alan Murphy (born 12 June 1996) is an Irish hurler who plays for Kilkenny Intermediate Championship club Glenmore and at inter-county level with the Kilkenny senior hurling team. He usually lines out as a right corner-forward.

== Playing career ==
=== University of Limerick ===
As a student at the University of Limerick, Murphy immediately became involved in hurling and joined the college's freshers' hurling team in his first year. On 5 March 2015, he was selected at right corner-forward when the University of Limerick faced University College Cork in the freshers' final. Murphy top scored with 1–14, including ten points from placed balls, and ended the game with a winners' medal following the 1–24 to 1–18 victory.

=== Glenmore ===
Murphy joined the Glenmore club at a young age and played in all grades at juvenile and underage levels before eventually joining the club's top adult team.

On 25 October 2015, Murphy won a Kilkenny Junior Championship medal after scoring a point from play in a 1–12 to 2–06 defeat of Kilmacow in the final. On 16 January 2016, he lined out at full-forward when Glenmore faced Lusmagh in the Leinster final. Murphy scored a point from play and ended the game with a winners' medal following the 0–23 to 0–13 defeat of Lusmagh. Murphy was switched to right corner-forward for the All-Ireland final against Eoghan Rua on 7 February 2016. He top scored with 2-02 from play and collected an All-Ireland medal following the 2–08 to 0–12 victory.

=== Kilkenny ===
==== Minor and under-21 ====
Murphy was selected for the Kilkenny minor team for the first time during the 2013 Leinster Championship. He made his first appearance for the team on 20 April 2013 when he scored 1–07 in a 3–20 to 1–09 defeat of Laois. On 7 July 2013, Murphy was at left corner-forward when Kilkenny faced Laois in the Leinster final. He scored 0-10 and ended the game with a winners' medal following the 1–18 to 0–08 victory. Murphy ended the championship as the second-highest scorer with 4-45.

On 6 July 2014, Murphy lined out at left corner-forward when Kilkenny faced Dublin in the Leinster final. He collected a second winners' medal after scoring 0–09 in the 2–19 to 2–10 victory. On 7 September 2014, Murphy was switched to right corner-forward for the All-Ireland final against Limerick. He scored six points from frees and ended the game with a winners' medal following the 2–17 to 0–19 victory. Murphy ended the championship as top scorer with 3-46.

Murphy was added to the Kilkenny under-21 panel prior to the start of the 2016 Leinster Championship. He made his first appearance in that grade on 25 May 2016 when he lined out at full-forward in Kilkenny's 1–11 to 0–12 defeat by Westmeath.

On 5 July 2017, Murphy won a Leinster Championship medal with the under-21 team after scoring five points from frees in 0–30 to 1–15 defeat of Wexford in the final. On 9 September 2017, he started the All-Ireland final against Limerick on the bench. Murphy was introduced as 25th-minute substitute and top scored for Kilkenny with five points in the 0–17 to 0–11 defeat.

==== Intermediate ====
Murphy was added to the Kilkenny intermediate team in advance of the All-Ireland final against Clare on 6 August 2016. He scored two points from frees from right wing-forward and collected a winners' medal following the 5–16 to 1–16 victory.

==== Senior ====
Murphy made his first appearance for the Kilkenny senior team on 12 March 2017. He lined out at right corner-forward but was substituted in the 40th minute in Kilkenny's 3–14 to 2–17 draw with Tipperary in the National League.

On 8 April 2018, Murphy was selected at right corner-forward when Kilkenny faced Tipperary in the National League final. He was held scoreless for the entire game but collected a winners' medal following the 2–23 to 2–17 victory.

Murphy made his Leinster Championship debut on 11 May 2019 when he lined out at midfield in Kilkenny's 2–23 to 1–21 defeat of Dublin. On 30 June 2019, Murphy was a late addition at right corner-forward when Kilkenny faced Wexford in the Leinster final. He scored a point from play but ended on the losing side following the 1–23 to 0–23 defeat. On 18 August 2019, Murphy was an unused substitute when Kilkenny suffered a 3–25 to 0–20 defeat by Tipperary in the All-Ireland final.

== Career statistics ==
As of match played 17 July 2021.

Team	Year	National League			Leinster		All-Ireland		Total	
Team	Year	Division	Apps	Score	Apps	Score	Apps	Score	Apps	Score
Kilkenny Minor	2013	—			5	4-35	1	0-10	6	4-45
Kilkenny Minor	2014	—			4	3-29	2	0-17	6	3-46
Kilkenny Minor	Total	—			9	7-64	3	0-27	12	7-91
Kilkenny U21	2016	—			1	0-00	—		1	0-00
Kilkenny U21	2017	—			3	1-21	2	0-09	5	1-30
Kilkenny U21	Total	—			4	1-21	2	0-09	6	1-30
Kilkenny Int.	2016	—			—		1	0-02	1	0-01
Kilkenny Int.	Total	—			—		1	0-02	1	0-02
Kilkenny	2017	Division 1A	1	0-00	0	0-00	0	0-00	1	0-00
Kilkenny	2018	Division 1A	5	0-16	0	0-00	0	0-00	5	0-16
Kilkenny	2019	Division 1A	3	1-17	4	0-07	0	0-00	7	1-24
Kilkenny	2020	Division 1A	5	1-32	2	0-01	1	0-00	8	1-33
Kilkenny	2021	Division 1B	5	0-18	2	0-03	0	0-00	7	0-21
Kilkenny	Total		19	2-83	8	0-11	1	0-00	28	2-94
Career total			19	2-83	21	8-96	7	0-38	47	10-217

== Honours ==
University of Limerick

- All-Ireland Freshers' Hurling Championship: 2015

Glenmore

- All-Ireland Junior Club Hurling Championship: 2016
- Leinster Junior Club Hurling Championship: 2015
- Kilkenny Junior Hurling Championship: 2015

Kilkenny

- Leinster Senior Hurling Championship: 2020, 2021
- National Hurling League: 2018
- Leinster Under-21 Hurling Championship: 2017
- All-Ireland Minor Hurling Championship: 2014
- Leinster Minor Hurling Championship: 2013, 2014
