= 2013 Croke Cup =

Irish hurling competition

- Dates: 16 March - 6 April 2013
- Teams: 5
- Sponsor: Masita
- Champions: Dungarvan Colleges (1st title); Tom Devine (captain)
- Runners-up: Kilkenny CBS; Robbie Fitzpatrick (captain)

Tournament statistics
- Matches played: 4
- Goals scored: 15 (3.75 per match)
- Points scored: 78 (19.5 per match)
- Top scorer(s): Chris Bolger (2-08); Patrick Curran (1-11)

The 2013 Croke Cup was the 62nd staging of the Croke Cup since its establishment by the Gaelic Athletic Association in 1944. The competition ran from 16 March to 6 April 2013 and was sponsored by Masita for the first time.

St Joseph's CBS, Nenagh were the defending champions, however, they were beaten by Midleton CBS Secondary School in the Harty Cup.

The final was played on 6 April 2013 at Semple Stadium in Thurles, between Dungarvan Colleges and Kilkenny CBS, in what was their first ever meeting in the final. Dungarvan Colleges won the match by 1–12 to 1–07 to claim their first ever Croke Cup title.

Chris Bolger and Patrick Curran were the joint-top scorers.

== Qualification ==
Province	Representatives	
Connacht	Mercy Colleges	
Leinster	St Kieran's College	Kilkenny CBS
Munster	Dungarvan Colleges	Our Lady's SS

== Results ==
=== Quarter-final ===
16 March 2013 Quarter-final	St Kieran's College	4-11 - 2-08	Our Lady's Secondary School	Jim Maher Memorial Park
	C Bolger (1f), V Teehan 1-2 each, P Mullen 1-1 (1f), J Maher 0-3, M Kenny 1-0, S Parsons, J Deasy, S Farrell ('65') 0-1 each.	Report	T Nolan 1-3, J McGrath 0-5 (4f, 1 '65'), D McEntee 1-0.	Referee: C McAllister (Cork)

=== Semi-finals ===
23 March 2013 Semi-final	Kilkenny CBS	1-12 - 0-10	Mercy Colleges	St Rynagh's Park
	K Kenny 1-4, N Mullins, P Cahill (1f) 0-2 each, M McWey, L Scanlan, P Delahanty, G Kelly 0-1 each.	Report	J Flynn 0-6 (3f, 2 '65'), K McHugo 0-2, S Caufield (1 '65'), E Morrissey 0-1 each.	Referee: J McGrath (Westmeath)

26 March 2013 Semi-final	Dungarvan Colleges	5-08 - 1-10	St Kieran's College	Waterford IT Campus
	D Lyons 3-1 (1f), P Curran 1-2 (1f, 1 ’65’), R Donnelly 1-1, C Breathnach 0-2, T Devine, S Keating 0-1 each.	Report	C Bolger 1-6 (6fs), S Farrell, L Blanchfield, V Teehan, P Mullen (f) 0-1 each.	Referee: F Horgan (Tipperary)

=== Final ===
6 April 2013 Final	Dungarvan Colleges	1-12 - 1-07	Kilkenny CBS	Semple Stadium
	P Curran 0-9 (5fs, 1 '65'), R Donnelly 1-0, C Dunford 0-2, M Harney 0-1.		P Cahill 1-3 (0-3fs), JP Treacy 0-2 (1 '65'), K Kenny, R Buckley 0-1 each.	Referee: S Hourigan (Limerick)

== Statistics ==
=== Top scorers ===
Rank	Player	Club	Tally	Total	Matches	Average
1	Chris Bolger	St Kieran's College	2-08	14	2	7.00
1	Patrick Curran	Dungarvan Colleges	1-11	14	2	7.00
3	Darragh Lyons	Dungarvan Colleges	3-01	10	2	5.00
4	Paddy Cahill	Kilkenny CBS	1-05	8	2	4.00
4	Kevin Kenny	Kilkenny CBS	1-05	8	2	4.00
