= Darragh Lyons =

Irish hurler

Personal information
- Native name: Darragh Ó Liatháin (Irish)
- Born: 15 May 1997 (age 29) Dungarvan, County Waterford, Ireland
- Occupation: Trainee buyer
- Height: 5 ft 5 in (165 cm)

Sport
- Sport: Hurling
- Position: Right wing-back
Club
- Years: Club
- Dungarvan
Club titles
- Waterford titles: 0
College
- Years: College
- 2016-2020: Cork Institute of Technology
College titles
- Fitzgibbon titles: 0
Inter-county
- Years: County
- 2017-present: Waterford
Inter-county titles
- Munster titles: 0
- All-Irelands: 0
- NHL: 0
- All Stars: 0

Darragh Lyons (born 15 May 1997) is an Irish hurler who plays for Waterford Championship club Dungarvan and at inter-county level with the Waterford senior hurling team. He usually lines out as a right wing-back.

== Honours ==
Dungarvan CBS

- All-Ireland Colleges Senior B Hurling Championship: 2013
- Munster Colleges Senior B Hurling Championship: 2013

Dungarvan Colleges

- Dr Croke Cup: 2013
- Dr Harty Cup: 2013

Waterford

- All-Ireland Under-21 Hurling Championship (1): 2016
- Munster Under-21 Hurling Championship (1): 2016
