= Patrick Curran (hurler) =

Irish hurler (born 1996)

Personal information
- Native name: Padraig Ó Corráin (Irish)
- Nickname: Weasel
- Born: 2 March 1996 (age 30) Dungarvan, County Waterford, Ireland
- Occupation: Student
- Height: 5 ft 9 in (175 cm)

Sport
- Sport: Hurling
- Position: Full-forward
Club
- Years: Club
- 2013-present: Dungarvan
Club titles
- Waterford titles: 0
College(s)
- Years: College
- 2014-2015 2015-2018: University College Cork; DCU Dóchas Éireann
College titles
- Fitzgibbon titles: 0
Inter-county*
Years	County	Apps (scores)
2015-present	Waterford	19 (0-15)
Inter-county titles
- Munster titles: 0
- All-Irelands: 0
- NHL: 0
- All Stars: 0
- *Inter County team apps and scores correct as of 23:48, 29 December 2019.

Patrick Curran (born 2 March 1996) is an Irish hurler who plays for Waterford Championship club Dungarvan and at inter-county level with the Waterford senior hurling team. He usually lines out as a full-forward.

== Playing career ==
=== Dungarvan Colleges ===
During his secondary schooling at Dungarvan CBS, Curran was added to the amalgamated Colaiste na nDéise team. On 25 February 2012, he was just 15-years-old when he was selected at left corner-forward for the Harty Cup final against Nenagh CBS. Curran scored 1-02 from play and claimed a winners' medal after the 2–14 to 1–10 victory.

On 24 February 2013, Curran was selected at centre-forward when the renamed Dungarvan Colleges faced Our Lady's Secondary School in the Harty Cup final. He scored eight points in total and ended the game with a second successive winners' medal after the 2–21 to 1–11 victory. On 6 April 2013, Curran was switched to left corner-forward when Dungarvan Colleges faced Kilkenny CBS in the All-Ireland final. He top scored with 0-09, including six from placed balls, and claimed a winners' medal after the 1–12 to 1–07 victory.

=== University College Cork ===
During his studies at University College Cork, Curran immediately became involved in hurling as a member of the university's freshers' team. On 1 December 2014, he was part of the UCC team that defeated the University of Limerick by 4–14 to 4–11 to win the Fresher Hurling League Division 1.

=== DCU Dóchas Éireann ===
After transferring to St. Patrick's College in Dublin, Curran quickly established himself as a hurler in the Fitzgibbon Cup. On 24 February 2018, he lined out at left corner-forward when the DCU Dóchas Éireann amalgamation faced the University of Limerick in the Fitzgibbon Cup final. Curran scored a goal from a penalty but ended the game on the losing side after a 2–21 to 2–15 defeat.

=== Dungarvan ===
Curran joined the Dungarvan club at a young age and played in all grades at juvenile and underage levels before eventually joining the club's top adult team in the Waterford Senior Championship.

=== Waterford ===
==== Minor and under-21 ====
Curran first played for Waterford when he was selected for the minor team in advance of the 2013 Munster Championship. He made his first appearance on 11 April 2013 when he scored 0–11 in a 1–15 to 2–18 defeat by Tipperary. On 14 July 2013, Curran scored 0-05 from right corner-forward when Waterford drew 2-19 apiece with Limerick in the Munster final. He was switched to centre-forward for the replay on 23 July 2013 but ended the game on the losing side after a 1–20 to 4–08 defeat. On 8 September, Curran lined out at full-forward when Waterford faced Galway in the All-Ireland final. He top-scored with 1-07 and claimed a winners' medal following the 1–21 to 0–16 victory. Curran also ended the championship as top scorer with 3-56.

On 13 July 2014, Curran lined out in a second successive Munster final. He top-scored for Waterford with 0–07 in the 2–17 to 3–14 draw with Limerick. Curran again top-scored in the replay on 22 July 2014 but ended the game on the losing side after a 0–24 to 0–18 defeat.

Curran immediately progressed onto the Waterford under-21 team for the 2015 Munster Championship. He made his first appearance for the team on 17 June 2015 when he scored 0-12 from left corner-forward in a 1–21 to 1–11 defeat of Cork.

Curran was appointed joint-captain of the Waterford under-21 team prior to the start of the 2016 Munster Championship. On 27 July 2016, he won a Munster Championship medal after scoring 0–08 in the 2–19 to 0–15 defeat of Tipperary in the final. On 10 September 2016, Curran was selected at right corner-forward for the All-Ireland final against Galway. He top-scored with 1–09 in the 5–15 to 0–14 victory and collected a winners' medal. Bennett ended the championship as top scorer with 3-34, while he was also named in the right corner-forward position on the Team of the Year.

On 13 July 2017, Curran made his final appearance for the Waterford under-21 hurling team when he scored 0–10, including seven from placed balls, in Waterford's 1–19 to 2–17 defeat by Cork in the Munster semi-final.

==== Senior ====
Curran was added to the Waterford senior panel in advance of the 2015 Munster Championship. He made his first appearance for the team on 7 June 2015 when he came on as a 68th-minute substitute for Jake Dillon in a 3–19 to 1–21 defeat of Cork. On 12 July 2015, Curran scored a point from play after coming on as a 43rd-minute substitute for Colin Dunford in the 0–21 to 0–16 defeat by Tipperary in the Munster final.

On 1 May 2016, Curran scored four points from right corner-forward when Waterford drew 0-22 apiece with Clare in the National League final. He was selected in the same position for the replay but spent much of the game at full-forward, where he scored 1-09, in the 1–23 to 2–19 defeat. On 10 July 2016, Curran scored five points from right corner-forward when Waterford suffered a 5–19 to 0–13 defeat by Tipperary in the Munster final.

On 3 September 2017, Curran was selected amongst the substitutes when Waterford qualified to play Galway in the 2017 All-Ireland final. He was introduced as a substitute for Kieran Bennett but ended the game on the losing side after a 0–26 to 2–17 defeat.

== Career statistics ==
As of match played 8 June 2019.

Team	Year	National League			Munster		All-Ireland		Total	
Team	Year	Division	Apps	Score	Apps	Score	Apps	Score	Apps	Score
Waterford	2015	Division 1B	0	0-00	2	0-02	2	0-00	4	0-02
Waterford	2016	Division 1A	8	2-45	2	0-05	3	0-01	13	2-51
Waterford	2017	Division 1A	4	1-04	1	0-00	4	0-05	9	1-09
Waterford	2018	Division 1A	4	2-17	3	0-02	—		7	2-19
Waterford	2019	Division 1B	3	2-02	2	0-00	—		5	2-02
Total			19	7-68	10	0-09	9	0-06	38	7-83

== Honours ==
Dungarvan CBS

- All-Ireland Colleges Senior B Hurling Championship (1): 2013
- Munster Colleges Senior B Hurling Championship (1): 2013
- All-Ireland Colleges Under-14 Hurling Championship (1): 2009
- Rice Cup: 2009

Dungarvan Colleges

- Croke Cup (1): 2013
- Harty Cup (2): 2012, 2013

University College Cork

- Higher Education Fresher Hurling League Division 1 (1): 2014

Waterford

- All-Ireland Under-21 Hurling Championship (1): 2016 (c)
- Munster Under-21 Hurling Championship (1): 2016 (c)
- All-Ireland Minor Hurling Championship (1): 2013

Achievements
Preceded by Diarmaid Byrnes	All-Ireland Under-21 Hurling Final winning captain 2016	Succeeded by Tom Morrissey
