= Leinster Under-20 Hurling Championship =

Leinster GAA Hurling Under-20 Championship
- Current season or competition: 2026 All-Ireland Under-20 Hurling Championship
- Irish: Craobh Iomána Fé-20 Laighin
- Code: Hurling
- Founded: 1964
- Region: Leinster (GAA)
- No. of teams: 8
- Title holders: Galway (3rd title)
- Most titles: Kilkenny (28 titles)
- Sponsors: oneills.com
- TV partner: TG4
- Official website: bgeu21.ie

The Leinster GAA Under-20 Hurling Championship (known for sponsorship reasons as the oneills.com Leinster GAA Under-20 Hurling Championship), is an annual inter-county hurling competition organised by the Leinster Council of the Gaelic Athletic Association (GAA). It is the highest inter-county hurling competition for male players between the ages of 17 and 20 in the province of Leinster. The championship was contested as the Leinster Under-21 Championship between 1964 and 2018 before changing to an under-20 age category from 2019. It is sponsored by oneills.com.

The series of games are played during the summer months with the Leinster final currently being played in July. The prize for the winning team is the Seán Robbins Cup. The championship has always been played on a straight knock-out basis whereby once a team loses they are eliminated from the series.

The Leinster Championship is an integral part of the wider All-Ireland Under-20 Hurling Championship. The winners of the Leinster final, like their counterparts in the Munster Championship, advance directly to the All-Ireland Under-20 Hurling Championship final.

Eight teams currently participate in the Munster Championship. Kilkenny is the most successful team with 27 titles, followed by Wexford with 17 titles. The title has been won by six different teams, four of whom have won the title more than once.

Galway are the current holders.

== History ==
=== Creation ===
The Leinster Championship began in 1964 in response to a Congress motion put forward by the Kerry County Board for the introduction of a new championship grade. It was the fifth championship to be created after the senior, junior, minor and intermediate grades.

=== Beginnings ===
The inaugural Leinster Championship featured Carlow, Dublin, Kildare, Kilkenny, Laois, Louth, Offaly, Westmeath and Wexford. Louth and Westmeath contested the very first match on Sunday 29 March 1964. Wexford won the inaugural championship.

=== Team dominance ===
Since the beginning the championship has been dominated by Kilkenny and Wexford. They won all bar one of the available championship titles between 1964 and 1977 and have won a combined total of 42 championship titles. Kilkenny also have the distinction of being the only team to win four championships in-a-row, achieving this feat on two separate occasions.

Dublin were the only team beside Kilkenny and Wexford to win the championship, with their lone title being claimed in 1967. Offaly and Laois added their names to the roll of honour in 1978 and 1983 respectively, however, the rest of the century belonged to Kilkenny and Wexford once again.

=== Proposed changes ===
In 2008 a motion was brought before a special Congress in an effort to combat player burnout. It was proposed to merge the existing under-21 and minor championships to create a new Leinster Under-19 Hurling Championship based on the provincial system. This motion was defeated by 115 votes to 58.

A similar motion was later introduced in an effort to lower the age and create a new Leinster Under-20 Championship based on the provincial system, however, this motion was also defeated.

=== Age change ===
At the GAA Congress on 24 February 2018, the age limit of the championship was changed to twenty, following a successful motion by the Offaly County Board. In contrast to Gaelic football, under-20 hurlers are eligible to play both under-20 and senior hurling for their county.

== Current format ==
=== Championship ===
The Leinster Championship is a knockout tournament with pairings drawn at random. Each match is played as a single leg. If a match is drawn there is a period of extra time, however, if the sides still remain level a replay is required.

There are nine teams in the Leinster Championship. The finalists from the previous year receive a bye to separate semi-finals. The four "weakest" teams contest two play-off rounds with the winner joining the other three teams in the championship proper at the quarter-final stage.

=== Qualification for the All-Ireland Championship ===
As of the 2018 championship qualification for the All-Ireland Championship has changed due to the introduction of a "back door" for defeated finalists. Both the champions and runners-up qualify for the All-Ireland semi-finals.

== Teams ==
=== Non-Leinster teams ===
On 30 September 2017, 72% of delegates at GAA Special Congress voted in favour of allowing Galway into the Leinster Championship along with any Ulster teams – as of agreed by the Ulster and Leinster Councils.

== Venues ==
=== History ===
Leinster Championship matches have always been played on a home and away basis whereby every second meeting between teams is played at the home venue of one of them. All of the current teams have home and away agreements, however, Antrim and Galway are not permitted to use their home grounds because they are outside the province of Leinster.

=== Attendances ===
Stadium attendances are a significant source of regular income for the Leinster Council and for the teams involved.

=== Final ===
The venue for the final also comes under the terms of the individual home and away agreements between the teams involved, however, on some occasions a neutral venue was used. The attendance at the 2024 final between Offaly and Dublin at Laois Hire O'Moore Park, Port Laoise was 15,215.

== Managers ==
Managers in the Leinster Championship are involved in the day-to-day running of the team, including the training, team selection, and sourcing of players from the club championships. Their influence varies from county-to-county and is related to the individual county boards. The manager is assisted by a team of two or three selectors and an extensive backroom team consisting of various coaches. The under-20 team manager also works closely with the senior team manager due to an overlap of players on both teams. Prior to the development of the concept of a manager in the 1970s, teams were usually managed by a team of selectors with one member acting as chairman.

Winning managers (2000–present)
Manager	Team	Wins	Winning years
J. J. Doyle	Wexford	3	2013, 2014, 2015
Séamus Murphy	Wexford	2	2001, 2002
Martin Fogarty	Kilkenny	2	2003, 2004
Adrian Finan	Kilkenny	2	2005, 2006
Michael Walsh	Kilkenny	2	2008, 2009
Leo O'Connor	Offaly	2	2023, 2024
Percy Clendennan	Offaly	1	2000
Seán Lane	Dublin	1	2007
Richard Stakelum	Dublin	1	2010
John McEvoy	Dublin	1	2011
Richie Mulrooney	Kilkenny	1	2012
Joe Fortune	Dublin	1	2016
Eddie Brennan	Kilkenny	1	2017
Tony Ward	Galway	1	2018
D. J. Carey	Kilkenny	1	2019
Paul O'Brien	Dublin	1	2020
Jeffrey Lynskey	Galway	1	2021
Derek Lyng	Kilkenny	1	2022

== Trophy and medals ==
At the end of the Leinster final, the winning team is presented with a trophy. The Seán Robbins Cup is held by the winning team until the following year's final. Traditionally, the presentation is made at a special rostrum in the stand where GAA and political dignitaries and special guests view the match.

The cup is decorated with ribbons in the colours of the winning team. During the game the cup actually has both teams' sets of ribbons attached and the runners-up ribbons are removed before the presentation. The winning captain accepts the cup on behalf of his team before giving a short speech. Individual members of the winning team then have an opportunity to come to the rostrum to lift the cup.

In accordance with GAA rules, the Leinster Council awards up to twenty-four gold medals to the winners of the Leinster final.

== Sponsorship ==
Since 2003, the Leinster Championship has been sponsored. The sponsor has usually been able to determine the championship's sponsorship name.

Period	Sponsor(s)	Name
1964–2002	No main sponsor	The Leinster Championship
2003–2007	(Republic of Ireland) Erin Foods	The Erin Leinster Under-21 Hurling Championship
2008–2018	(Republic of Ireland) Bord Gáis Energy	The Bord Gáis Energy Leinster GAA Hurling Under-21 Championship
2019-2021	(Republic of Ireland) Bord Gáis Energy	The Bord Gáis Energy Leinster GAA Hurling Under-20 Championship
2022-2025	(Republic of Ireland) oneills.com	The oneills.com Leinster GAA Under-20 Hurling Championship
2026-	(Republic of Ireland) FULFIL protein and energy bars	The FulFil Leinster GAA Under-20 Hurling Championship

== Results ==
=== Summaries ===
All-Ireland champions
All-Ireland runners-up

Year	Winners	Score	Runners-up	Score	Venue	Winning Captain
1964	Wexford	4-07	Laois	2-02	Wexford Park	Jim Berry
1965	Wexford	7-09	Dublin	1-05	Croke Park	Willie O'Neill
1966	Wexford	7-10	Laois	2-08	O'Moore Park	
1967	Dublin	2-10	Offaly	2-09	Croke Park	
1968	Kilkenny	4-10	Dublin	5-04	Nowlan Park	
1969	Wexford	3-16	Kilkenny	4-03	Dr. Cullen Park	
1970	Wexford	2-15	Kilkenny	5-04	Dr. Cullen Park	Liam Bennett
1971	Wexford	2-16	Kilkenny	2-09	Dr. Cullen Park	Martin Quigley
1972	Dublin	2-11	Offaly	0-15	O'Moore Park	J. Kealy
1973	Wexford	2-13	Offaly	2-10	Dr. Cullen Park	
1974	Kilkenny	3-08	Wexford	1-05	Dr. Cullen Park	Ger Fennelly
1975	Kilkenny	3-14	Wexford	0-08	Dr. Cullen Park	Kevin Fennelly
1976	Kilkenny	3-21	Wexford	0-05	Dr. Cullen Park	
1977	Kilkenny	3-11	Wexford	1-10	Dr. Cullen Park	Micky Lyng
1978	Offaly	2-14	Laois	2-07	Dr. Cullen Park	
1979	Wexford	1-08 (0-14)	Kilkenny	0-10 (2-08)	Dr. Cullen Park	
1980	Kilkenny	2-14	Wexford	2-09	Dr. Cullen Park	
1981	Kilkenny	6-11	Wexford	2-10	Dr. Cullen Park	
1982	Kilkenny	5-20	Offaly	2-06	Dr. Cullen Park	
1983	Laois	3-13	Wexford	4-08	Croke Park	
1984	Kilkenny	0-18	Wexford	1-10	Dr. Cullen Park	Séamus Delahunty
1985	Kilkenny	4-18	Wexford	1-04	Croke Park	
1986	Wexford	1-16 (2-09)	Offaly	0-10 (2-09)	Nowlan Park	
1987	Wexford	4-11	Wexford	0-05	Nowlan Park	
1988	Kilkenny	3-13	Offaly	2-05	O'Moore Park	Frankie Morgan
1989	Offaly	3-16	Kilkenny	3-09	O'Moore Park	
1990	Kilkenny	2-09	Laois	1-10	Dr. Cullen Park	Jamesie Brennan
1991	Offaly	2-10	Kilkenny	0-12	O'Moore Park	
1992	Offaly	1-15	Kilkenny	2-10	O'Moore Park	
1993	Kilkenny	4-13	Wexford	2-07	Dr. Cullen Park	David Beirne
1994	Kilkenny	1-14	Wexford	0-15	Dr. Cullen Park	Philly Larkin
1995	Kilkenny	2-11	Wexford	1-12	Dr. Cullen Park	Peter Barry
1996	Wexford	2-15 (1-09)	Offaly	2-05 (0-12)	Dr. Cullen Park	Paul Codd
1997	Wexford	2-13	Offaly	0-15	Dr. Cullen Park	
1998	Kilkenny	2-10	Dublin	0-12	Dr. Cullen Park	Paul Hoyne
1999	Kilkenny	1-17	Offaly	1-06	O'Moore Park	Noel Hickey
2000	Offaly	3-14	Kilkenny	2-14	O'Moore Park	Michael O'Hara
2001	Wexford	0-10	Kilkenny	1-05	Wexford Park	Nicky Lambert
2002	Wexford	1-15	Dublin	0-15	O'Moore Park	Darren Stamp
2003	Kilkenny	0-12	Dublin	1-04	Dr. Cullen Park	Jackie Tyrrell
2004	Kilkenny	1-16	Wexford	2-03	Wexford Park	James "Cha" Fitzpatrick
2005	Kilkenny	0-17	Dublin	1-10	Dr. Cullen Park	Richie Power
2006	Kilkenny	2-18	Dublin	2-10	Nowlan Park	Michael Fennelly
2007	Dublin	2-18	Offaly	3-09	Parnell Park	John McCaffrey
2008	Kilkenny	2-21	Offaly	2-09	O'Connor Park	James Dowling
2009	Kilkenny	2-20	Dublin	1-19	Parnell Park	David Langton
2010	Dublin	2-15	Wexford	0-15	Parnell Park	Finn McGarry
2011	Dublin	1-18	Wexford	0-11	Wexford Park	Liam Rushe
2012	Kilkenny	4-24	Laois	1-13	O'Moore Park	Cillian Buckley
2013	Wexford	1-21	Kilkenny	0-21	Wexford Park	Lee Chin
2014	Wexford	1-20	Dublin	0-18	Parnell Park	Shane O'Gorman
2015	Wexford	4-17	Kilkenny	1-9	Wexford Park	Eoin Conroy
2016	Dublin	2-15	Offaly	1-10	O'Connor Park	Shane Barrett
2017	Kilkenny	0-30	Wexford	1-14	Nowlan Park	Pat Lyng
2018	Galway	4-21	Wexford	2-26	O'Moore Park	Fintan Burke
2019	Kilkenny	1-17	Wexford	0-18	Innovate Wexford Park	Evan Shefflin
2020	Dublin	1-20	Galway	1-18	Bord na Móna O'Connor Park	Andrew Dunphy
2021	Galway	2-15	Dublin	0-15	MW Hire O'Moore Park	Seán Neary
2022	Kilkenny	1-13	Wexford	0-15	Netwatch Cullen Park	Padraig Moylan
2023	Offaly	1-22	Wexford	0-23	Netwatch Cullen Park	Charlie Mitchell
2024	Offaly	1-18	Dublin	1-15	Laois Hire O'Moore Park	Dan Bourke
2025	Kilkenny	2-21	Dublin	0-16	Laois Hire O'Moore Park	Eamon Furlong
2026	Galway	2-20	Kilkenny	2-11	Laois Hire O'Moore Park	Donnacha Campbell

== Performances by counties ==
No.	Team	Wins	Years won	Losses	Years lost
1	Kilkenny	28	1968, 1974, 1975, 1976, 1977, 1980, 1981, 1982, 1984, 1985, 1988, 1990, 1993, 1994, 1995, 1998, 1999, 2003, 2004, 2005, 2006, 2008, 2009, 2012, 2017, 2019, 2022, 2025	11	1969, 1970, 1971, 1979, 1989, 1991, 1992, 2000, 2013, 2015, 2026
2	Wexford	17	1964, 1965, 1966, 1969, 1970, 1971, 1973, 1979, 1986, 1987, 1996, 1997, 2001, 2002, 2013, 2014, 2015	20	1974, 1975, 1976, 1977, 1980, 1981, 1983, 1984, 1985, 1993, 1994, 1995, 2004, 2010, 2011, 2017, 2018, 2019, 2022, 2023
3	Offaly	7	1978, 1989, 1991, 1992, 2000, 2023, 2024	13	1967, 1972, 1973, 1982, 1986, 1987, 1988, 1996, 1997, 1999, 2007, 2008, 2016
3	Dublin	7	1967, 1972, 2007, 2010, 2011, 2016, 2020	13	1965, 1968, 1998, 2001, 2002, 2003, 2005, 2006, 2009, 2014, 2021, 2024, 2025
5	Galway	3	2018, 2021, 2026	1	2020
6	Laois	1	1983	5	1964, 1966, 1978, 1990, 2012

== Records ==
=== Final ===
==== Team ====
- Most titles: 28:
  - Kilkenny (1968, 1974, 1975, 1976, 1977, 1980, 1981, 1982, 1984, 1985, 1988, 1990, 1993, 1994, 1995, 1998, 1999, 2003, 2004, 2005, 2006, 2008, 2009, 2012, 2017. 2019, 2022, 2025)
- Most consecutive title wins: 4:
  - Kilkenny (1974, 1975, 1976, 1977)
  - Kilkenny (2003, 2004, 2005, 2006)
- Most appearances in a final: 38:
  - Kilkenny (1968, 1969, 1970, 1971, 1974, 1975, 1976, 1977, 1979, 1980, 1981, 1982, 1984, 1985, 1988, 1989, 1990, 1991, 1992, 1993, 1994, 1995, 1998, 1999, 2000, 2003, 2004, 2005, 2006, 2008, 2009, 2012, 2013, 2015, 2017, 2019, 2022, 2025)

=== Teams ===
==== By decade ====
The most successful team of each decade, judged by number of championship titles, is as follows:

- 1960s: 4 for Wexford (1964-65-66-69)
- 1970s: 4 each for Wexford (1970-71-73-79) and Kilkenny (1974-75-76-77)
- 1980s: 6 for Kilkenny (1980-81-82-84-85-88)
- 1990s: 6 for Kilkenny (1990-93-94-95-98-99)
- 2000s: 6 for Kilkenny (2003-04-05-06-08-09)
- 2010s: 3 each for Dublin (2010-11-16), Kilkenny (2012-17-19) and Wexford (2013-14-15)
- 2020s: 2 each for Galway (2021 & 2026), Kilkenny (2022 & 25) and Offaly (2023-24).

==== Gaps ====
Top five longest gaps between successive championship titles:

- 35 years: Dublin (1972-2007)
- 23 years: Offaly (2000-2023)
- 11 years: Offaly (1978-1989)
- 11 years: Wexford (2002-2013)
- 9 years: Wexford (1987-1996)
- 8 years: Offaly (1992-2000)

=== Top scorers ===
==== By year ====
Year	Top scorer	Team	Score	Total
1986	Dermot Prendergast	Wexford	0-23	23
1987	Pat McEvoy	Kilkenny	3-06	15
1988	John Rigney	Offaly	3-04	13
1989	Michael Duignan	Offaly	3-13	22
1990	D. J. Carey	Kilkenny	3-04	13
1991	John Brady	Offaly	3-05	14
1992	Johnny Dooley	Offaly	0-19	19
1993	Damien Lawlor	Kilkenny	1-15	18
1993	Jim Byrne	Wexford	0-18	18
1994	Thomas Kavanagh	Wexford	0-15	15
1995	Ollie O'Connor	Kilkenny	1-20	23
1996	John Kelly	Offaly	2-14	20
1996	Damian Cleere	Kilkenny	2-14	20
1997	Emmet Carroll	Dublin	4-03	15
1998	Tomás McGrane	Dublin	1-22	25
1999	Henry Shefflin	Kilkenny	3-09	19
2000	Conor Gath	Offaly	1-13	16
2001	Brian McCormack	Laois	0-17	17
2002	Barry Lambert	Wexford	1-25	28
2003	Conal Keaney	Dublin	2-17	23
2004	James Fitzpatrick	Kilkenny	0-20	20
2005	Eoin Larkin	Kilkenny	1-26	29
2006	Kevin O'Reilly	Dublin	0-14	14
2007	Alan McCrabbe	Dublin	2-21	27
2008	Colm Coughlan	Offaly	2-18	24
2009	Mark Bergin	Kilkenny	0-14	14
2010	Paudie Kehoe	Carlow	1-16	19
2010	Mark Bergin	Kilkenny	1-16	19
2011	Kevin O'Loughlin	Dublin	1-21	24
2012	Stephen Maher	Laois	0-23	23
2013	Stephen Quirke	Offaly	2-19	25
2014	Paul Winters	Dublin	0-22	22
2015	Conor McDonald	Wexford	2-27	33
2016	Emmet Nolan	Offaly	4-11	23
2017	Killian Doyle	Westmeath	0-30	30
2018	Séamus Casey	Wexford	1-27	30
2019	Cathal Kiely	Offaly	0-44	44
2020	Donal O'Shea	Galway	2-27	33
2021	Liam Dempsey	Kildare	0-37	37
2022	Cian Byrne	Wexford	0-36	36
2023	Adam Screeney	Offaly	2-51	57
2024	Adam Screeney	Offaly	1-50	53

==== In a single game ====
Year	Top scorer	Team	Score	Total
2015	Conor McDonald	Wexford	1-10	13
2016	Emmet Nolan	Offaly	2-07	13
2017	Jack Sheridan	Kildare	2-09	15
2018	Chris Nolan	Carlow	1-11	14
2018	Séamus Casey	Wexford	1-11	14
2019	Cathal Kiely	Offaly	0-20	20
2020	Donal O'Shea	Galway	2-07	13
2021	James Duggan	Laois	3-05	14
2021	Liam Dempsey	Kildare	0-14	14
2021	Tadhg Cuddy	Laois	0-14	14
2022	Billy Drennan	Kilkenny	0-17	17
2023	Billy Drennan	Kilkenny	2-12	18
2024	Fionn Maher	Kildare	3-08	17

==== In finals ====
Final	Top scorer	Team	Score	Total
1996	Gary Laffan	Wexford	1-05	8
1997	Killian Farrell	Offaly	0-07	7
1998	Henry Shefflin	Kilkenny	1-04	7
1999	Henry Shefflin	Kilkenny	1-04	7
2000	Kevin Power	Kilkenny	0-07	7
2001	Barry Lambert	Wexford	0-04	4
2002	Barry Lambert	Wexford	1-08	11
2003	Conal Keaney	Dublin	1-02	5
2004	Richie Power	Kilkenny	1-03	6
2005	Eoin Larkin	Kilkenny	0-10	10
2006	David McCormack	Kilkenny	1-05	8
2007	Alan McCrabbe	Dublin	0-09	9
2008	Joe Bergin	Offaly	2-01	7
2009	Jonjo Farrell	Kilkenny	2-02	8
2010	Daire Plunkett	Dublin	1-03	6
2010	Shane Tompkins	Wexford	0-06	6
2011	Kevin O'Loughlin	Dublin	0-08	8
2012	Ger Aylward	Kilkenny	2-05	11
2013	John Power	Kilkenny	0-09	9
2013	Jack Guiney	Wexford	0-09	9
2014	Paul Winters	Dublin	0-09	9
2015	Conor McDonald	Wexford	1-10	13
2016	Seán Treacy	Dublin	2-02	8
2017	Richie Leahy	Kilkenny	0-05	5
2017	Alan Murphy	Kilkenny	0-05	5
2017	Joe Coleman	Wexford	0-05	5
2018	Séamus Casey	Wexford	1-11	14
2019	Ross Banville	Wexford	0-07	7
2020	Donal O'Shea	Galway	0-08	8
2021	Ciarán Foley	Dublin	0-08	8
2022	Cian Byrne	Wexford	0-10	10
2023	Adam Screeney	Offaly	1-12	15
2024	Adam Screeney	Offaly	0-09	9
2025	Michael Brennan	Kilkenny	0-08	8
2026	Jack Shaughnessy	Galway	1-07	10

== See also ==
- All-Ireland Under-20 Hurling Championship
  - Connacht Under-20 Hurling Championship
  - Munster Under-20 Hurling Championship
  - Ulster Under-20 Hurling Championship
- All-Ireland Under-20 B Hurling Championship
