= Oisín Kelly (hurler) =

Irish hurler

Personal information
- Native name: Oisín Ó Ceallaigh (Irish)
- Born: 1997 (age 28–29) Belmont County Offaly, Ireland
- Occupation: Student

Sport
- Sport: Hurling
- Position: Left corner-forward
Club
- Years: Club
- Belmont GAA
Club titles
- Offaly titles: 0
Inter-county*
Years	County	Apps (scores)
2016-	Offaly	1 (1-00)
Inter-county titles
- Leinster titles: 0
- All-Irelands: 0
- NHL: 0
- All Stars: 0
- *Inter County team apps and scores correct as of 20:23, 13 July 2016.

Oisín Kelly (born 1997) is an Irish hurler who plays as a left corner-forward for the Offaly senior team.

Born in Belmont, County Offaly, Kelly first played competitive hurling during his schooling at Banagher College. He arrived on the inter-county scene at the age of sixteen when he first linked up with the Offaly minor team before later joining the under-21 side. Kelly made his senior debut during the 2016 championship.

At club level Kelly plays hurling with Belmont GAA and football with Ferbane GAA.
