= Tom Devine (hurler) =

Irish hurler

Personal information
- Native name: Tomás Ó Daimhin (Irish)
- Born: 11 April 1995 (age 31) Waterford, Ireland
- Occupation: Doctor
- Height: 1.88 m (6 ft 2 in)

Sport
- Sport: Hurling
- Position: Midfield
Club
- Years: Club
- Modeligo
Club titles
- Waterford titles: 0
College
- Years: College
- University College Cork
College titles
- Fitzgibbon titles: 0
Inter-county*
Years	County	Apps (scores)
2015-2019	Waterford	9 (2-04)
Inter-county titles
- Munster titles: 0
- All-Irelands: 0
- NHL: 1
- All Stars: 0
- *Inter County team apps and scores correct as of 19:16, 3 May 2019.

Thomas Devine (born 11 April 1995) is an Irish hurler who plays as a full-forward for the Waterford senior team.

Born in Dungarvan, County Waterford, Devine first played competitive hurling during his schooling at St. Augustine's College. In 2013 he captained Dungarvan to the All Ireland colleges title, beating Kilkenny CBS. He arrived on the inter-county scene at the age of seventeen when he first linked up with the Waterford minor team before later joining the under-21 side. Devine played midfield in 2013 as Waterford won the All Ireland minor title for the first time since 1948. Three years later, he was part of the same team that captured the county's second All Ireland U-21 title, again beating Galway. He made his senior debut during the 2015 league. Devine has since become a regular member of the team and has won one National Hurling League medal.

At club level Devine is a one-time Munster medallist in the junior grade with Modeligo. In addition to this he has also won one championship medal in the same grade.

== Career statistics ==
Team	Year	National League			Munster		All-Ireland		Total	
Team	Year	Division	Apps	Score	Apps	Score	Apps	Score	Apps	Score
Waterford	2015	Division 1B	6	2-03	2	1-00	1	0-00	9	3-03
Waterford	2016	Division 1A	9	2-02	2	0-00	1	0-00	12	2-02
Waterford	2017	Division 1A	5	3-03	—		—		5	3-03
Waterford	2018	Division 1A	4	0-01	3	1-04	—		7	1-05
Waterford	2019	Division 1B	—		—		—		—	
Total			24	7-09	7	2-04	2	0-00	33	9-13

== Honours ==
Dungarvan Colleges

- Dr Croke Cup: 2013 (c)
- Dr Harty Cup: 2012, 2013 (c)

Modeligo

- Munster Junior Club Hurling Championship (1): 2014
- Waterford Junior Hurling Championship (1): 2014

Waterford

- National Hurling League (1): 2015
- All-Ireland Minor Hurling Championship (1): 2013
