= Josh Keane =

Irish Gaelic footballer and hurler

Personal information
- Born: 16 July 1995 (age 31)

Sport
- Sport: Gaelic Football
- Position: Right Half Forward
Club
- Years: Club
- 2012-present: Golden–Kilfeacle
Inter-county
Years	County	Apps (scores)
2016-present	Tipperary	5 (0-02)

Josh Keane (born 16 July 1995) is an Irish Gaelic football and hurling player who plays at inter-county level for Tipperary, and plays his club football for Golden–Kilfeacle.

== Career ==
Keane played for the Tipperary minor hurling team in 2012 and 2013 and with the under-21 hurling team in 2016. He played for the Tipperary minor football team in 2013 and the under-21 football team from 2014 until 2016. He was also part of the intermediate hurling panel in 2016. Keane made his championship debut for the Tipperary football team in 2016 against Waterford. On 31 July 2016, he started in the half forward line as Tipperary defeated Galway in the 2016 All-Ireland Quarter-finals at Croke Park to reach their first All-Ireland semi-final since 1935. On 21 August 2016, Tipperary were beaten in the semi-final by Mayo on a 2-13 to 0-14 scoreline.

== Honours ==
Tipperary

- Munster Under-21 Football Championship (1): 2015
- National Football League Division 3 (1): 2017
