= Ronan Lynch =

Irish hurler (born 1996)

Personal information
- Native name: Rónán Ó Loingsigh (Irish)
- Born: Limerick, Ireland
- Occupation: Student
- Height: 1.9 m (6 ft 3 in)

Sport
- Sport: Hurling
- Position: Left Half Forward
Club
- Years: Club
- 2013–: Na Piarsaigh
Club titles
- Limerick titles: 4
- Munster titles: 3
- All-Ireland Titles: 1
Inter-county
- Years: County
- 2015–: Limerick
Inter-county titles
- Munster titles: 0
- All-Irelands: 0
- NHL: 0
- All Stars: 0

Ronan Lynch (born 1996) is an Irish hurler who plays as a left corner-forward for the Limerick senior team.

Born in Limerick, Lynch first played competitive hurling during his schooling at Ardscoil Rís. He arrived on the inter-county scene at the age of fifteen when he first linked up with the Limerick minor team before later joining the under-21 side. He joined the senior team during the 2015 championship.

At club level Lynch plays with Na Piarsaigh.

== Playing career ==
=== College ===
During his schooling at Ardscoil Rís in Limerick, Lynch established himself as a key member of the senior hurling team. In 2014 he won a Harty Cup medal following a 2–13 to 0–4 trouncing of Limerick rivals Scoil na Trionóide, Doon.

=== Minor and under-21 ===
Lynch was just fifteen-years-old when he first played for Limerick as a member of the minor team on 2 May 2012. He scored 0–11 on his debut in a 0–16 to 1–12 Munster quarter-final defeat of Cork.

In 2013 Lynch was at left wing-back as Limerick faced Waterford in the provincial decider. As Waterford looked to be heading for victory, a last-minute goal from substitute Tom Morrissey ensured a 2–19 apiece draw. The replay was also a close affair, however, Cian Lynch's first-half stoppage time goal proved decisive as Limerick ended a 29-year wait for the title with a 1–20 to 4–8 victory. It was Lynch's first Munster medal.

Lynch was eligible for the minor grade once again in 2014, as Waterford faced the team in the Munster final for a second year in succession. Limerick looked all set to retain their title when leading their opponents by three points in added time, however, Waterford substitute Shane Ryan struck for a dramatic late goal to send the game to a replay. The replay was also a close affair, however, Limerick pulled away in the end to secure a 0–24 to 0–18 victory and a second Munster medal for Lynch. On 7 September 2014 Limerick faced Kilkenny in the All-Ireland decider. A 2–5 haul from Kilkenny corner-forward John Walsh ensured a 2–17 to 0–19 defeat for Lynch's side.

== Career statistics ==
=== Club ===
As of match played 10 February 2018.

Team	Year	Munster		All-Ireland		Total	
Team	Year	Apps	Score	Apps	Score	Apps	Score
Na Piarsaigh	2015–16	3	0-03	2	0-02	5	0-05
Na Piarsaigh	2017–18	2	0–18	1	0–14	3	0–32
Total		5	0–21	3	0–16	8	0–37

== Honours ==
=== Player ===
Ardscoil Rís

- Dr Harty Cup (1): 2014

Limerick

- All-Ireland Under-21 Hurling Championship (2): 2015, 2017
- Munster Under-21 Hurling Championship (2): 2015, 2017
- Munster Minor Hurling Championship (2): 2013, 2014

Na Piarsaigh

- Limerick Senior Club Hurling Championship (2): 2015, 2017
- Munster Senior Club Hurling Championship (2): 2015, 2017
- All-Ireland Senior Club Hurling Championship (1): 2016

=== Individual ===
Awards

- Munster Minor Hurler of the Year (1): 2013
