= Leinster Minor Hurling Championship =

Annual hurling competition in Ireland

- Current season or competition: 2026 Leinster Minor Hurling Championship
- Irish: Craobh Iománaíochta Mionúir Laighin
- Code: Hurling
- Founded: 1928; 98 years ago
- Region: Leinster (GAA)
- Trophy: Hanrahan Cup
- No. of teams: 11
- Title holders: Galway (2nd title)
- Most titles: Kilkenny (61 titles)
- Sponsors: Electric Ireland
- TV partner: TG4
- Official website: Official website

The Leinster GAA Hurling Minor Championship (known for sponsorship reasons as the Electric Ireland Leinster GAA Hurling Minor Championship, is an annual inter-county hurling competition organised by the Leinster Council of the Gaelic Athletic Association (GAA). It is the highest inter-county hurling competition for male players under the age of 17 in the province of Leinster, and has been contested every year – except for a three-year absence during the Emergency – since the 1928 championship. Despite the name, the competition also includes teams from Ulster and Connacht since 2023.

The final, usually held on the last Sunday in June, serves as the culmination of a series of games played during April, May and June, and the results determine which team receives the Hanrahan Cup. The championship was previously played on a straight knockout basis whereby once a team lost they were eliminated from the championship, however, the championship has since incorporated a round-robin system.

The Leinster Championship is an integral part of the wider GAA Hurling All-Ireland Minor Championship. The winners of the Leinster final, like their counterparts in the Munster Championship, are rewarded by advancing directly to the semi-final stage of the All-Ireland series of games. The losers of the Leinster final enter the All-Ireland series at the quarter-final group stage.

11 teams currently participate in the Leinster Championship.

== Trophy ==
At the end of the Leinster final, the winning team is presented with a trophy. The Hanrahan Cup is named after Walter Hanrahan (Wexford), the first Secretary of the Leinster Council.

== General statistics ==
=== Performance by county ===
	County	Won	Runner-up	Years won	Years runner-up
1	Kilkenny	61	20	1930, 1931, 1932, 1933, 1935, 1936, 1937, 1939, 1942, 1948, 1949, 1950, 1951, 1955, 1956, 1957, 1958, 1959, 1960, 1961, 1962, 1969, 1971, 1972, 1973, 1974, 1975, 1976, 1977, 1978, 1979, 1981, 1982, 1984, 1988, 1990, 1991, 1992, 1993, 1994, 1995, 1996, 1997, 1998, 1999, 2001, 2002, 2003, 2004, 2006, 2008, 2009, 2010, 2013, 2014, 2015, 2017, 2020, 2021, 2024, 2025	1928, 1929, 1941, 1945, 1947, 1952, 1954, 1963. 1964, 1968, 1970, 1985, 1987, 1989, 2007, 2011, 2018, 2019, 2023, 2026
2	Dublin	16	24	1928, 1938, 1945, 1946, 1947, 1952, 1953, 1954, 1965, 1983, 2005, 2007, 2011, 2012, 2016, 2018	1932, 1933, 1934, 1936, 1937, 1939, 1940, 1942, 1949, 1951, 1961, 1967, 1969, 1974, 1975, 1980, 1993, 1996, 2000, 2004, 2010, 2014, 2015, 2017
3	Wexford	8	26	1963, 1966, 1967, 1968, 1970, 1980, 1985, 2019	1955, 1956, 1959, 1960, 1962, 1965, 1971, 1972, 1973, 1976, 1977, 1981, 1983, 1984, 1986, 1992, 1998, 1999, 2001, 2002, 2005, 2008, 2009, 2012, 2016, 2021
4	Offaly	5	10	1986, 1987, 1989, 2000, 2022	1948, 1950, 1957, 1982, 1988, 1994, 1995, 1997, 2003, 2020
5	Laois	4	12	1934, 1940, 1941, 1964	1930, 1935, 1938, 1940, 1946, 1953, 1958, 1966, 1978, 1990, 1991, 2013, 2022
6	Galway	2	2	2023, 2026	2024, 2025
7	Meath	1	1	1929	1931
8	Carlow	0	1		2006
8	Antrim	0	1		1979

=== Biggest Leinster final wins ===
- The most one sided Leinster finals:
  - 29 points – 1974: Kilkenny 8-19 (43) – (14) 3-5 Dublin
  - 27 points – 1972: Kilkenny 7-10 (31) – (4) 0-4 Wexford
  - 26 points – 2006: Kilkenny 4-22 (34) – (8) 1-5 Carlow
  - 25 points – 1971: Kilkenny 7-18 (39) – (14) 3-5 Wexford
  - 25 points – 1946: Dublin 7-5 (26) – (1) 0-1 Laois
  - 25 points – 1935: Kilkenny 7-8 (29) – (4) 1-1 Laois

=== Miscellaneous ===
- Kilkenny hold the record for the longest streak of success. For ten championship seasons between 1990 and 1999 the county failed to lose a game and won ten Leinster titles in-a-row.
- Kilkenny hold the record for the most consecutive appearances in Leinster finals. They played in twelve in a row between 1968 and 1979, with success coming on ten of those occasions.
- Four counties have completed the minor and senior double in the same year:
  - Kilkenny in 1931, 1932, 1933, 1935, 1936, 1937, 1939, 1950, 1957, 1958, 1959, 1969, 1971, 1972, 1973, 1974, 1975, 1978, 1979, 1982, 1991, 1992, 1993, 1998, 1999, 2001, 2002, 2003, 2006, 2008, 2009, 2010, 2014, 2015, 2020, 2021
  - Dublin in 1928, 1938, 1952
  - Wexford in 1968, 1970, 2019
  - Offaly in 1989

== List of Leinster Finals ==
All-Ireland champions
All-Ireland runners-up

Year	Winners	Score	Runners-up	Score	Venue	Winning Captain
1928^{1}	Dublin	w/o	Kilkenny	scr.		
1929	Meath	10-01 (31)	Kilkenny	6-01 (19)	O'Connor Park	
1930	Kilkenny	6-03 (21)	Laois	3-05 (14)	Nowlan Park	
1931	Kilkenny	4-09 (21)	Meath	0-03 (3)	Croke Park	John Shortall
1932	Kilkenny	9-06 (33)	Dublin	6-01 (19)	Croke Park	
1933	Kilkenny	5-08 (23)	Dublin	2-06 (12)	Wexford Park	
1934	Laois	8-04 (28)	Dublin	2-00 (6)	O'Moore Park	
1935	Kilkenny	7-08 (29)	Laois	1-01 (4)	Nowlan Park	Paddy Grace
1936	Kilkenny	3-13 (22)	Dublin	1-01 (4)	Nowlan Park	Éamonn Tallent
1937	Kilkenny	6-12 (30)	Dublin	2-04 (10)	Dr. Cullen Park	
1938	Dublin	5-04 (19)	Laois	1-03 (6)	O'Moore Park	
1939	Kilkenny	3-08 (17)	Dublin	2-02 (8)	O'Moore Park	
1940^{2}	Dublin	10-05 (35)	Laois	3-03 (12)	Nowlan Park	
1941	Laois	3-05 (14)	Kilkenny	2-04 (10)	Nowlan Park	
1942	Kilkenny	3-10 (19)	Dublin	0-04 (4)	Croke Park	
1943-1944	Championship suspended due to the Emergency					
1945	Dublin	5-04 (19)	Kilkenny	3-01 (10)	Croke Park	Des Healy
1946	Dublin	7-05 (26)	Laois	0-01 (1)	Croke Park	Geoff Sutton
1947 (R)	Dublin	1-05 (8); 3-02 (11)	Kilkenny	2-02 (8); 2-04 (10)	O'Moore Park; Croke Park	
1948	Kilkenny	5-02 (17)	Offaly	3-06 (15)	O'Connor Park	
1949	Kilkenny	4-06 (18)	Dublin	0-04 (4)	Nowlan Park	
1950	Kilkenny	4-02 (14)	Offaly	3-02 (11)	Nowlan Park	Pat Lennon
1951	Kilkenny	5-11 (26)	Dublin	2-02 (8)	Nowlan Park	
1952	Kilkenny	4-07 (19)	Carlow	0-01 (1)	Sports Grounds	
1953	Dublin	2-06 (12)	Laois	1-04 (7)	O'Moore Park	
1954	Dublin	4-12 (24)	Kilkenny	4-07 (19)	Nowlan Park	Bernie Boothman
1955 (R)	Kilkenny	3-10 (19); 0-11 (11)	Wexford	5-04 (19); 0-8 (8)	Croke Park	
1956	Kilkenny	4-07 (19)	Wexford	3-07 (16)	Croke Park	
1957	Kilkenny	5-10 (25)	Offaly	4-02 (14)	Croke Park	
1958	Kilkenny	5-11 (26)	Laois	1-07 (10)	Wexford Park	
1959	Kilkenny	7-09 (30)	Wexford	3-04 (13)	Croke Park	
1960	Kilkenny	6-14 (32)	Wexford	5-05 (20)	Croke Park	Billy Grace
1961	Kilkenny	4-12 (24)	Dublin	0-07 (7)	Croke Park	Joe Dunphy
1962	Kilkenny	5-07 (22)	Wexford	5-04 (19)	Croke Park	Joe Dunphy
1963	Wexford	6-10 (28)	Kilkenny	6-08 (26)	Croke Park	Willie Bernie
1964	Laois	4-09 (21)	Kilkenny	3-08 (17)	Croke Park	
1965	Dublin	4-07 (19)	Wexford	1-06 (9)	Croke Park	Liam Martin
1966	Wexford	7-06 (27)	Laois	1-07 (10)	Croke Park	Pat Bernie
1967	Wexford	6-07 (25)	Dublin	2-03 (9)	Croke Park	
1968	Wexford	4-11 (23)	Kilkenny	4-04 (16)	Croke Park	Tom Byrne
1969	Kilkenny	3-09 (18)	Dublin	2-07 (13)	Croke Park	
1970	Wexford	3-10 (19)	Kilkenny	1-10 (13)	Dr. Cullen Park	
1971	Kilkenny	7-18 (39)	Wexford	3-05 (14)	Croke Park	
1972	Kilkenny	7-10 (31)	Wexford	0-04 (4)	Croke Park	Brian Cody
1973	Kilkenny	3-10 (19)	Wexford	2-09 (15)	Croke Park	Kevin Robinson
1974	Kilkenny	8-19 (43)	Dublin	3-05 (14)	Croke Park	
1975	Kilkenny	2-18 (24)	Dublin	3-04 (13)	Croke Park	Harry Ryan
1976	Kilkenny	2-14 (20)	Wexford	1-08 (11)	Croke Park	
1977	Kilkenny	5-10 (25)	Wexford	3-06 (15)	Croke Park	Seán Fennelly
1978	Kilkenny	4-19 (31)	Laois	2-06 (12)	Croke Park	
1979	Kilkenny	5-13 (28)	Antrim	1-09 (12)	Croke Park	
1980	Wexford	1-10 (13)	Dublin	2-06 (12)	Croke Park	
1981	Kilkenny	3-10 (19)	Wexford	3-09 (18)	Croke Park	Eddie Kennedy
1982	Kilkenny	3-16 (25)	Offaly	3-04 (13)	Croke Park	
1983	Dublin	5-14 (29)	Wexford	4-12 (24)	Croke Park	
1984	Kilkenny	2-10 (16)	Wexford	1-11 (14)	Croke Park	
1985	Wexford	0-12 (12)	Kilkenny	0-08 (8)	Croke Park	
1986	Offaly	4-07 (19)	Wexford	1-12 (15)	Croke Park	Michael Hogan
1987	Offaly	2-13 (19)	Kilkenny	0-12 (12)	Croke Park	Tomás Moylan
1988	Kilkenny	2-16 (22)	Offaly	0-06 (6)	Croke Park	Patsy Brophy
1989 (R)	Offaly	0-14 (14); 4-13 (25)	Kilkenny	0-14 (14); 0-13 (13)	Croke Park; O'Moore Park	Brian Whelahan
1990	Kilkenny	3-15 (24)	Laois	0-15 (15)	Croke Park	James McDermott
1991	Kilkenny	1-20 (23)	Laois	0-04 (4)	Croke Park	Dan O'Neill
1992	Kilkenny	1-09 (12)	Wexford	0-11 (11)	Croke Park	
1993	Kilkenny	4-14 (26)	Dublin	0-11 (11)	Croke Park	Shane Doyle
1994	Kilkenny	2-13 (19)	Offaly	3-06 (15)	Croke Park	
1995	Kilkenny	4-16 (28)	Offaly	2-06 (12)	Croke Park	
1996	Kilkenny	1-16 (19)	Dublin	1-11 (14)	Croke Park	Michael Hoyne
1997	Kilkenny	3-16 (25)	Offaly	1-10 (13)	Croke Park	Michael Hoyne
1998 (R)	Kilkenny	1-11 (14); 2-15 (21)	Wexford	1-11 (14); 0-6 (6)	Croke Park; Dr. Cullen Park	Paul Shefflin
1999 (R)	Kilkenny	0-13 (13); 2-13 (19)	Wexford	0-13 (13); 1-11 (14)	Croke Park; Dr. Cullen Park	
2000	Offaly	0-13 (13)	Dublin	0-08 (8)	Croke Park	
2001	Kilkenny	3-16 (25)	Wexford	1-09 (12)	Croke Park	
2002	Kilkenny	2-15 (21)	Wexford	2-08 (14)	Croke Park	Michael Rice
2003	Kilkenny	0-18 (18)	Offaly	0-13 (13)	Croke Park	Richie Power
2004	Kilkenny	1-15 (18)	Dublin	1-04 (7)	Croke Park	Matthew Ruth
2005	Dublin	0-17 (17)	Wexford	0-12 (12)	Croke Park	John McCaffrey
2006	Kilkenny	4-22 (34)	Carlow	1-05 (8)	Croke Park	Colin McGrath
2007	Dublin	2-14 (20)	Kilkenny	1-10 (13)	Croke Park	Barry O'Rouke
2008	Kilkenny	1-19 (23)	Wexford	0-12 (12)	Croke Park	Thomas Breen
2009	Kilkenny	1-19 (22)	Wexford	0-11 (11)	Croke Park	Canice Maher
2010	Kilkenny	1-20 (23)	Dublin	0-10 (10)	Croke Park	Cillian Buckley
2011	Dublin	1-14 (17)	Kilkenny	1-11 (14)	Croke Park	Chris Crummey
2012	Dublin	2-15 (21)	Wexford	1-14 (17)	Croke Park	
2013	Kilkenny	1-18 (21)	Laois	0-08 (8)	Croke Park	
2014	Kilkenny	2-19 (25)	Dublin	2-10 (16)	Croke Park	
2015	Kilkenny	1-17 (20)	Dublin	1-15 (18)	Croke Park	
2016	Dublin	2-12 (18)	Wexford	0-12 (12)	Croke Park	
2017	Kilkenny	3-15 (24)	Dublin	1-17 (20)	Croke Park	Adrian Mullen
2018	Dublin	6-19 (37)	Kilkenny	7-12 (33)	O'Moore Park	Donal Leavy
2019	Wexford	3-14 (23)	Kilkenny	3-10 (19)	Croke Park	Richie Lawlor
2020	Kilkenny	2-21 (27)	Offaly	3-09 (18)	MW Hire O'Moore Park	Timmy Clifford
2021	Kilkenny	1-15 (18)	Wexford	2-10 (16)	Dr. Cullen Park	Harry Shine
2022	Offaly	0-21 (21)	Laois	0-13 (13)	MW Hire O'Moore Park	Dan Ravenhill
2023	Galway	2-20 (26)	Kilkenny	0-14 (14)	MW Hire O'Moore Park	
2024	Kilkenny	1-13 (16)	Galway	1-09 (12)	MW Hire O'Moore Park	
2025	Kilkenny	4-11 (23)	Galway	1-08 (11)	MW Hire O'Moore Park	
2026	Galway	3-20 (29) AET	Kilkenny	3-19 (28)	MW Hire O'Moore Park	Gus Lohan

1. Kilkenny were disqualified from the championship due to their registration not being in order.
2. Laois were awarded the title following an objection.

== Records and statistics ==
=== By decade ===
The most successful team of each decade, judged by number of Leinster Minor Hurling Championship titles, is as follows:

- 1930s: 8 for Kilkenny (1930-31-32-33-35-36-37-39)
- 1940s: 3 each for Kilkenny (1942-48-49) and Dublin (1945-46-47)
- 1950s: 7 for Kilkenny (1950-51-55-56-57-58-59)
- 1960s: 4 each for Kilkenny (1960-61-62-69) and Wexford (1963-66-67-68)
- 1970s: 9 for Kilkenny (1971-72-73-74-75-76-77-78-79)
- 1980s: 4 for Kilkenny (1981-82-84-88)
- 1990s: 10 for Kilkenny (1990-91-92-93-94-95-96-97-98-99)
- 2000s: 7 for Kilkenny (2001-02-03-04-06-08-09)
- 2010s: 5 for Kilkenny (2010-13-14-15-17)
- 2020s: 4 for Kilkenny (2020-21-24-25)

=== Top scorers ===
==== Overall ====
Year	Name	Team	Score	Total
2004	Joe Bergin	Offaly	1-18	21
2005	Kevin O'Reilly	Dublin	1-29	32
2006	Richie Hogan	Kilkenny	5-32	47
2007	Lee Murphy	Wexford	2-30	36
2008	Michael O'Hanlon	Wexford	3-37	46
2009	Barry O'Meara	Westmeath	3-21	30
2010	Aonghus Clarke	Westmeath	1-26	29
2011	Stephen Maher	Laois	1-23	26
2012	Paul Winters	Dublin	3-29	38
2013	Alan Murphy	Kilkenny	4-35	47
2014	Alan Murphy	Kilkenny	3-29	38
2015	Mark Kavanagh	Laois	3-23	32
2016	Rory O'Connor	Wexford	3-33	42
2017	Adrian Mullen	Kilkenny	3-38	47
2018	Conor Kelly	Kilkenny	2-57	63
2019	David Qualter	Kildare	8-37	61
2020	Lochlainn Quinn	Offaly	1-42	45
2021	Fionn Maher	Kildare	0-29	29
2022	Ben Deegan	Laois	3-48	57

==== Finals ====
Year	Name	Team	Score	Total
2008	Joe Brennan	Kilkenny	0-07	7
2009	Seán Kehoe	Kilkenny	0-11	11
2010	John Power	Kilkenny	0-08	8
2011	Cormac Costello	Dublin	1-02	5
2012	Paul Winters	Dublin	1-05	8
2013	Alan Murphy	Kilkenny	0-10	10
2014	Liam Blanchfield	Kilkenny	2-03	9
2015	Matthew Oliver	Dublin	0-10	10
2016	Donal Burke	Dublin	1-03	6
2017	Adrian Mullen	Kilkenny	1-09	12
2018	Liam Dunne	Dublin	2-08	14
2019	A. J. Redmond	Wexford	1-11	14
2020	Billy Drennan	Kilkenny	0-13	13
2021	Luke Roche	Wexford	0-07	7
2022	Adam Screeney	Offaly	0-10	10
2022	Ben Deegan	Laois	0-10	10
