= Emmet Nolan =

Irish hurler

Personal information
- Native name: Eiméid Ó Nualláin (Irish)
- Born: 1995 (age 30–31) Birr, County Offaly, Ireland
- Occupation: Student

Sport
- Sport: Hurling
- Position: Midfield
Club
- Years: Club
- Birr
Club titles
- Offaly titles: 0
College
- Years: College
- University of Limerick
College titles
- Fitzgibbon titles: 0
Inter-county*
Years	County	Apps (scores)
2014-present	Offaly	5 (0-01)
Inter-county titles
- Leinster titles: 0
- All-Irelands: 0
- NHL: 0
- All Stars: 0
- *Inter County team apps and scores correct as of 13:23, 29 June 2016.

Emmet Nolan (born 1995) is an Irish hurler who plays as a midfielder for the Offaly senior team.

Born in Birr, County Offaly, Nolan first played competitive hurling during his schooling at St. Brendan's College. He arrived on the inter-county scene at the age of sixteen when he first linked up with the Offaly minor team before later joining the under-21 side. Nolan made his senior debut during the 2015 championship.

At club level Nolan plays with Birr.
