= 2013 All-Ireland Minor Hurling Championship =

All-Ireland Minor Hurling Championship 2013
Championship Details
- Dates: 11 April 2013 – 8 September 2013

All Ireland Champions
- Winners: Waterford (3rd win)
- Captain: Kevin Daly
- Manager: Seán Power

All Ireland Runners-up
- Runners-up: Galway
- Captain: Darragh Dolan
- Manager: Mattie Murphy

Provincial Champions
- Munster: Limerick
- Leinster: Kilkenny
- Ulster: Antrim
- Connacht: Not Played

Championship Statistics
- Matches Played: 26
- Top Scorer: Patrick Curran (3-56)

The 2013 All-Ireland Minor Hurling Championship (also known as the Electric Ireland GAA Hurling All-Ireland Minor Championship for sponsorship reasons) was the 83rd staging of the All-Ireland Minor Hurling Championship since its establishment by the Gaelic Athletic Association in 1928. The championship began on 11 April 2013 and ended on 8 September 2013.

Tipperary entered the championship as the defending champions; however, they were beaten by Limerick in the Munster semi-final.

On 8 September 2013 Waterford won the championship following a 1–21 to 0–16 defeat of Galway in the All-Ireland final. This was their 3rd All-Ireland title overall and their first since 1948.

Waterford's Patrick Curran was the championship's top scorer with 3-56.

== Results ==
=== Leinster Minor Hurling Championship ===
First round

20 April 2013 First round	Kilkenny	3-20 - 1-9	Laois	Nowlan Park, Kilkenny
15:00	A Murphy 1-7 (0-6f), J Walsh 1-4 (0-2f), L Hennessy 0-4, K Kenny 1-1, C Ryan 0-2, S Farrell, E Kenny 0-1 each.		M Kavanagh 0-3 (0-3f), A Corby 1-0 (f), C Stapleton, J Campion 0-2 each, L Bergin 0-1 (f), L O'Connell 0-1.

20 April 2013 First round	Offaly	5-23 - 2-10	Carlow	O'Connor Park, Tullamore
19:00	C Daly 3-1, D Murray 0-7 (0-5 frees & 0-1 ’65), D Mahon 1-3, J Kilmartin 1-1, E Nolan 0-2 (0-1 free), J Fogarty 0-2 (frees), C Freeman 0-2, A Spain 0-1, D Kelly 0-1, D Doughan 0-1, P Guinan 0-1, R Hughes 0-1 .	Report	J Doyle 0-7 (4fs), C Foley 1-1, J Shinnors 1-0, E Nolan, K Hosey 0-1 each.	Referee: P Burke (Kilkenny)

20 April 2013 First round	Wicklow	1-11 - 8-10	Kildare	Aughrim County Ground, Aughrim
15:00	P Doran 0-8 (1' 65 6 fs), E McCormack 1-0, J Cranley 0-2, C Lambert 0-1.		E O'Hehir 3-1, E Dempsey 3-2, B Byrne 1-3, J Reeves 0-2, P Moran, N Kenny 1-0, T Forde 0-1 each.

27 April 2013 First round	Meath	2-17 - 2-13	Westmeath	St. Loman's Park, Trim
15:00	Jack Regan 0-6 (4fs, 1 65); Jack Fagan 1-2; Mark Healy 1-1; Josh Wall, David Reilly, Sean Doyle 0-2 each; Sean Quigley, Stefan Kelly 0-1 each.	Report	Cillian Doyle 1-4; Michael Daly 1-1; Ciaran Doyle 0-4; Darragh Clinton 0-2; Luke Loughlin, Alan Cox 0-1 each.	Referee: K Brady (Louth)

Second round

4 May 2013 Second round	Laois	3-16 - 1-5	Meath	O'Moore Park, Portlaoise
15:00	S Bergin 1-3; C Ryan, J Lennon 1-1 each; A Corby 0-3; M Kavanagh (1f), L Bergin 0-2 each; C Stapleton, J Campion, G Dunne, D Cripps (1f) 0-1 each.	Report	J Regan (3f) 0-4; J Fagan 1-1.	Referee: M Flynn (Kilkenny)

4 May 2013 Second round	Carlow	3-12 - 3-14	Kildare	Dr. Cullen Park, Carlow
15:00	J Doyle (1-4), C Foley (1-4), N Cogan (1-0), J Shinnors (0-2), D Wall (0-1), O Meaney (0-1).	Report	E Dempsey (2-2), E O'Hehir (0-7), N Kenny (1-0), B Byrne (0-2), E Doddy (0-1), J Reeves (0-1), P Moran (0-1).	Referee: P Burke

4 May 2013 Second round	Offaly	1-11 - 1-21	Dublin	O'Connor Park, Tullamore
15:00	D Murray 0-6 (0-4 frees), C Kiely 1-1 (1-0 penalty & 0-1 free), E Nolan 0-3 (0-1 free), J Fogarty 0-1.	Report	S Treacy 0-8 (0-5 frees & 0-2 frees), C O'Callaghan 1-5, E Ó Conghaile 0-3, S Ryan 0-2, E Conroy 0-2, A Jemieson Murphy 0-1.	Referee: C Jones (Kildare)

4 May 2013 Second round	Kilkenny	1-10 - 3-7	Wexford	Nowlan Park, Kilkenny
15:00	S Farrell 1-1, A Murphy 0-3 frees, J Walsh 0-3, C Ryan, E Kenny, L Blanchfield 0-1 each.	Report	C McDonald 3-4 (1-2 from placed ball), D Shanley, P Foley and J Cash 0-1 each.

Quarter-finals

18 May 2013 Quarter-final	Kildare	1-9 - 7-16	Kilkenny	St. Conleth's Park, Newbridge
15:00	B Byrne (0-6), N Kenny (1-0), E Doddy (0-2), C Egan (0-1).	Report	A Murphy (3-6), M Kenny (3-2), N Mullins (1-0), L Blanchfield (0-2), L Scanlon (0-2), E Kenny (0-2); V Teehan (0-1), J Maher (0-1).	Referee: K Brady (Louth)

18 May 2013 Quarter-final	Laois	4-16 - 0-13	Offaly	O'Moore Park, Portlaoise
17:15	S Bergin (2-2), J Campion (1-2), A Corby (0-5), J Lennon (1-1), D Cripps (0-3), L Bergin (0-1), L O'Connell (0-1), C Collier (0-1).	Report	D Murray (0-7), C Doughan (0-3), P Guinan (0-1), J Fogarty (0-1), J K Kilmartin (0-1).	Referee: G McGrath (Dublin)

Semi-finals

22 June 2013 Semi-final	Dublin	2-7 - 0-17	Kilkenny	Parnell Park, Dublin
15:00	C Bennett (1-2), J Treacy (1-1, 1-0 pen, 1f), S Treacy (0-4, 3f).	Report	A Murphy (0-9, 8f, 1'65), C Ryan (0-2) G Kelly (0-1), L Blanchfield (0-1), J Stanley (0-1), K Kenny (0-1), D O'Connor (0-1), M Kenny (0-1).	Referee: P O'Dwyer

23 June 2013 Semi-final	Laois	1-14 - 0-13	Wexford	O'Moore Park, Portlaoise
13:45	D Cripps (0-5, 3f), S Bergin (1-0), C McEvoy (0-3, 2f, 1'65), A Corby (0-2), L Bergin (0-1), R Delahunty (0-1), J Lennon (0-1), J Campion (0-1).		C McDonald (0-5, 4f, 1'65), D Pepper (0-2), J Bridges (0-2), D Shanley (0-2), S Donohue (0-1), B Eviston (0-1).	Referee: D Harrington

Final

7 July 2013 Final	Kilkenny	1-18 - 0-8	Laois	Croke Park, Dublin
	A Murphy 0-10 (6fs, 2 '65s'), M Kenny 1-0, V Teehan, L Blanchfield 0-2 each, J Maher, C Ryan, K Kenny, L Scanlon 0-1 each.	Report	C McEvoy (2 '65s'), A Corby 0-2 each, D Cripps (f), M Kavanagh (f), C Collier, J Campion 0-1 each.	Referee: J Keenan (Wicklow)

=== Munster Minor Hurling Championship ===
Quarter-finals

11 April 2013 Quarter-final	Waterford	1-15 - 2-18	Tipperary	Walsh Park, Waterford
19.00	P Curran 0-11 (8f, 1 65), M Kearney 1-0, A Farrell, T Devine, M O’Brien, C Gleeson 0-1 each.	Report	J Keane 2-9 (7f, 1-0 pen), W Connors, C Lanigan 0-3 each, C O’Riordan 0-2, S Hennessy 0-1.	Referee: J O'Connell (Cork)

11 April 2013 Quarter-final	Cork	3-15 - 2-14	Clare	Páirc Uí Rinn, Cork
19.00	P O’Callaghan 2-6 (1-0 pen, 0-2f), A Spillane 1-1, T Horgan 0-3, P Kelleher, K O’Neill 0-2 each, M O’Connor 0-1.	Report	B Duggan 2-8 (1-0pen, 0-5f, 0-1 65), I Galvin, D Begley 0-2 each, E Tuohy (1f), C Downey 0-1 each.	Referee: J O'Brien (Tipperary)

Play-off

1 May 2013 Play-off	Waterford	4-18 - 1-10	Clare	Fraher Field, Dungarvan
19:00	P Curran 0-6 (1 65); Stephen Bennett 2-0 (1-0p); C Curran 1-2; A Farrell 0-3; M Kearney 0-3; C Gleeson 1-0; C Breathnach, A Gleeson, M O’Brien, DJ Foran, 0-1 each.	Report	B Duggan 1-8 (4f, 0-1 65); A Morey, D Begley, 0-1 each.	Referee: A Sherlock (Tipperary)

Semi-finals

26 June 2013 Semi-final	Tipperary	0-17 - 1-17	Limerick	Semple Stadium, Thurles
19:30	J Keane (0-7, four frees), C O’Riordan (0-4), S Conlon (0-1), T Fox (0-1), W Connors (0-1), C Lanigan (0-1), M McCarthy (0-1), D Quinn (0-1).		R Lynch (1-7, goal pen, six frees), D Dempsey (0-4), C Lynch (0-2), B Nash (0-1), D Coleman (0-1), P Ryan (0-1), T Morrissey (0-1).	Referee: D Fox (Clare)

26 June 2013 Semi-final	Cork	1-20 - 3-19 (AET)	Waterford	Páirc Uí Rinn, Cork
19:30	P O'Callaghan (0-10), M Cahalane (1-1), A Spillane (0-4), M O'Connor (0-3), R Cahalane (0-1), C Cormack (0-1).	Report	P Curran (0-12), C Roche (1-3), Stephen Bennett (1-1), DJ Foran (1-0), C Breathnach (0-1), P O'Connor (0-1), C Gleeson (0-1).	Referee: F Horgan (Tipperary)

Finals

14 July 2013 Final	Limerick	2-19 - 2-19	Waterford	Gaelic Grounds, Limerick
1:45	R Lynch 1-9 (1-9fs), T Morrissey 1-1, C Lynch 0-4, B Nash 0-3, P Ryan 0-2.	Report	S Bennett 1-2, M Harney 1-1, P Curran 0-5 (1f), A Gleeson (2fs), C Roche 0-3 each, C Gleeson 0-2, A Farrell, DJ Foran, M Kearney 0-1 each.	Referee: F Horgan (Tipperary)

23 July 2013 Final replay	Limerick	1-20 - 4-8	Waterford	Semple Stadium, Thurles
19:30	R Lynch 0-6 (5f), C Lynch 1-2, T Morrissey, B Nash & P Ryan 0-3 each, D Dempsey 0-2, D Coleman 0-1.	Report	Stephen Bennett 3-2 (1-0f), A Farrell 1-0, P Curran 0-3 (1f), C Curran 0-2, C Gleeson 0-1.	Referee: J O'Brien (Tipperary)

=== Ulster Minor Hurling Championship ===
Semi-finals

16 June 2013 Semi-final	Armagh	1-13 - 5-17	Antrim	Páirc Esler, Newry
12:00	B Coulter (0-7, 6f), C McAnallen (0-4, 3f, '65), L Oliver (1-0), P McKearney (0-1), D Grant (0-1).	Report	C Johnson (0-8, 7f), J McCurdy (2-1), E McFerran (1-2), R McCambridge (1-0), C McAlister (1-0), D Nugent (0-2), D Moran (0-2), C McDonnell (0-2).	Referee: B Sweeney

16 June 2013 Semi-final	Down	2-12 - 1-9	Derry	Páirc Esler, Newry
13:45	C Fitzsimmons (0-5), R McCusker (1-1), C Costello (1-0), E Sands (0-3), P Óg McCrickard (0-2f), C Egan (0-1f).	Report	C O'Doherty (0-6, 5f), P Bradley (1-0), N McCallion (0-1), M McGuigan (0-1), M Mulgrew (0-1).	Referee: L McAuley

Final

7 July 2013 Final	Antrim	2-20 - 1-12	Down	Athletic Grounds, Armagh
13:30	C Johnson (0-9, 0-6 frees), J McCurdy (2-2), S McCaughan (0-4), A Delargy (0-3), C McAlister (0-2).	Report	P Óg McCrickard (0-6, 0-3 frees), C Fitzsimmons (1-1), R Campbell (0-2), PJ Davidson (0-1), C Egan (0-1), R McCusker (0-1).	Referee: J Clarke (Cavan)

=== All-Ireland Minor Hurling Championship ===
Quarter-finals

27 July 2013 Quarter-final	Waterford	4-20 - 1-9	Antrim	Ashbourne
14:00	P Curran (2-5, two frees, two 65s), Stephen Bennett (2-1, goal, free), A Gleeson (0-4, one free), M Kearney (0-4), M Harney (0-2), DJ Foran (0-2), M O’Brien (0-1), P O’Connor (0-1)	Report	D Nugent (1-2, goal and point from frees), C Johnson (0-3, one free), C McNaughton (0-2, two frees), J McCurdy (0-1), C McDonnell (0-1)	Referee: J Heffernan

28 July 2013 Quarter-final	Galway	1-19 0-13	Laois	Semple Stadium, Thurles
	Conor Whelan 1-2, Brian Burke 0-4, Brian Molloy 0-4 (3f), Adrian Morrissey 0-3, Darragh Dolan & Ronan O’Meara 0-2 each, Éanna Burke & Conor Shaughnessy 0-1 each	Report	Darragh Cripps 0-5f, Aidan Corby 0-4, Joe Campion 0-2, Ronan Delahunty & Leigh Bergin 0-1 each.	Referee: O Elliott (Antrim)

Semi-finals

11 August 2013 Semi-final	Waterford	2-12 0-16	Kilkenny	Croke Park, Dublin
13:30	P Curran (0-7, (5fs, 1 65); DJ Foran (1-1); A Farrell (1-0); M Harney, M O’Brien, Stephen Bennett, M Kearney (0-1 each)	Report	A Murphy (0-10 (fs); L Blanchfield, J Walsh (0-2 each); K Kenny, N Mullins (0-1 each)	Referee: S Hourigan (Limerick)

18 August 2013 Semi-final	Galway	0-23 - 0-20	Limerick	Croke Park, Dublin
13:30	B Molloy 0-9 (4f, 2 65’), C Whelan 0-4, A Morrissey 0-3, B Burke 0-2, C Shaughnessy, D Dolan, E Brannigan, R O’Meara, E Burke all 0-1	Report	B Nash 0-6 (4f), D Dempsey, D O’Donovan, R Lynch (3f) all 0-3, C Lynch 0-2, D Coleman D Kennedy, E Doyle all 0-1	Referee: F Horgan (Tipperary)

Final

8 September 2013 Final	Waterford	1-21 0-16	Galway	Croke Park
13:30	P Curran (1-07, 0-04f, 0-1 ’65), Stephen Bennett (0-4), M Kearney (0-4), C Roche (0-3), A Gleeson (0-1, f), T Devine (0-1), DJ Foran (0-1)	Report	B Molloy (0-5, 0-4f), R O'Meara (0-4), D Dolan (0-3), S Cooney (0-1f), C Whelan (0-1), A Morrissey (0-1 sideline), B Burke (0-1)	Referee: C McAllister (Cork)

== Championship statistics ==
=== Top scorers ===
Top scorer overall

Rank	Player	County	Tally	Total	Matches	Average
1	Patrick Curran	Waterford	3-56	65	8	8.13
2	Alan Murphy	Kilkenny	4-45	57	6	9.50
3	Stephen Bennett	Waterford	9-11	38	8	4.75
4	Ronan Lynch	Limerick	2-25	31	4	7.75
5	Bobby Duggan	Clare	3-16	25	2	12.50
6	Josh Keane	Tipperary	2-16	22	2	11.00
7	Pa O'Callaghan	Cork	2-16	22	2	11.00
8	Conor Johnson	Antrim	0-20	20	3	6.66
8	Dylan Murray	Offaly	0-20	20	3	6.66
10	Evan Dempsey	Kildare	5-04	19	2	8.50

Top scorer in a single game

Rank	Player	County	Tally	Total	Opposition
1	Alan Murphy	Kilkenny	3-06	15	Kildare
1	Josh Keane	Tipperary	2-09	15	Waterford
3	Bobby Duggan	Clare	2-08	14	Cork
4	Conor McDonald	Wexford	3-04	13	Kilkenny
5	Pa O'Callaghan	Cork	2-06	12	Clare
5	Ronan Lynch	Limerick	1-09	12	Waterford
5	Patrick Curran	Cork	0-12	12	Cork
8	Michael Kenny	Kilkenny	3-02	11	Kildare
8	Stephen Bennett	Waterford	3-02	11	Limerick
8	Evan Dempsey	Kildare	3-02	11	Wicklow
8	Bobby Duggan	Clare	1-08	11	Waterford
8	Patrick Curran	Waterford	0-11	11	Tipperary

=== Miscellaneous ===
- The Munster semi-final play-off between Clare and Waterford, originally fixed for 17 April, was postponed by two weeks due to adverse weather conditions.
- Laois qualified for the Leinster minor hurling final for the first time since 1991.
- Waterford's Munster semi-final win was their first ever victory over Cork at a Cork venue at minor level.
- Limerick and Waterford met in the Munster minor hurling final for the first time since 1958.
- The semi-final between Limerick and Galway would prove to be controversial due to the incorrect disallowing of an early Limerick point by the new Hawk-Eye system. Limerick's attempts to have the results overturned due to the error were unsuccessful.
