= Mark Kavanagh =

Irish hurler

Personal information
- Native name: Marc Caomhánach (Irish)
- Born: 3 February 1997 (age 29) Rathdowney, County Laois, Ireland

Sport
- Sport: Hurling
- Position: Full-forward
Club
- Years: Club
- 2014-present: Rathdowney–Errill
Club titles
- Laois titles: 1
Inter-county*
Years	County	Apps (scores)
2016-present	Laois	6 (0-17)
Inter-county titles
- Leinster titles: 0
- All-Irelands: 0
- NHL: 0
- All Stars: 0
- *Inter County team apps and scores correct as of 21:09, 8 July 2019.

Mark Kavanagh (born 1997) is an Irish hurler who plays for Laois Senior Championship club Rathdowney–Errill and at inter-county level with the Laois senior hurling team. He usually lines out as a full-forward.

== Career statistics ==
As of match played 7 July 2019.

Team	Year	National League			McDonagh Cup		Leinster		All-Ireland		Total	
Team	Year	Division	Apps	Score	Apps	Score	Apps	Score	Apps	Score	Apps	Score
Laois	2016	Division 1B	2	0-01	—		0	0-00	1	0-01	3	0-02
Laois	2017	Division 1B	0	0-00	—		2	0-01	2	0-06	4	0-07
Laois	2018	Division 1B	6	0-58	4	0-01	—		—		10	0-59
Laois	2019	Division 1B	6	1-44	3	0-30	—		1	0-09	10	1-83
Career total			14	1-93	7	0-31	2	0-01	4	0-16	27	1-141

== Honours ==
Rathdowney-Errill

- Laois Senior Hurling Championship (1): 2014
