= 2025–26 Harty Cup =

Hurling tournament

2025–26 Dr Harty Cup
- Dates: 15 October 2025 – 31 January 2026
- Teams: 16
- Sponsor: TUS
- Champions: Nenagh CBS (2nd title); Eoghan Doughan (captain); Donach O’Donnell (manager)
- Runners-up: St Flannan's College; James Cullinan (captain); Brendan Bugler (manager)

Tournament statistics
- Matches played: 31
- Goals scored: 87 (2.81 per match)
- Points scored: 1079 (34.81 per match)
- Top scorer: Eoghan Doughan (4-63)

The 2025–26 Dr Harty Cup was the 105th staging of the Harty Cup since its establishment by the Munster Council of the Gaelic Athletic Association in 1918. The draw for the group stage took place on 29 May 2025. The competition ran from 15 October 2025 to 31 January 2026.

Thurles CBS were the defending champions, however, they were beaten by Nenagh CBS in the semi-finals.

The final was played on 31 January 2026 at Zimmer Biomet Páirc Chiosóg, between Nenagh CBS and St Flannan's College, in what was their second meeting in the final overall and a first meeting in 36 years. Nenagh CBS won the match by 0–20 to 0–18 to claim their second Harty Cup title overall and a first title in two years.

Eoghan Doughan was the top scorer with 4-63.

== Team changes ==
=== To the competition ===
- CBS High School Clonmel

=== From the competition ===
- Castletroy College
- CBS Charleville
- Coláiste Choilm
- Rice College
- St Francis College
- Tralee CBS

== Group 1 ==
=== Group 1 table ===
Knockout stage

Team	Matches				Score			Pts
Team	Pld	W	D	L	For	Against	Diff	Pts
St Flannan's College	3	2	1	0	84	57	27	5
Nenagh CBS	3	2	1	0	93	54	39	5
Ardscoil Rís	3	1	0	2	69	73	-4	2
Cashel Community School	3	0	0	3	44	106	-62	0

=== Group 1 results ===
15 October 2025 Round 1	Ardscoil Rís	2-23 - 2-15	Cashel Community School	Cappamore Grounds
	J O’Keeffe (0-4 frees) and I O’Brien (1-4 each), J Cosgrove (0-6), E Brosnan and S Waters (0-2 each), M McKenna, J O’Connor, D O’Keeffe, G O’Brien and C Conlon Ryan (0-1 each).	Report	S Cooney (0-7, 0-6 frees, 0-1 65), S Mackey and W Colville (1-0 each), C Hall (0-3 frees), C Walsh and C Fogarty (0-2 each), T Meracre (0-1).

15 October 2025 Round 1	St Flannan's College	2-18 - 1-21	Nenagh CBS	TUS Moylish Grounds
	H Doherty 0-8 (0-6f); T O’Connor 1-2; J Barry 1-0; P Finneran 0-3; J Cullinan 0-1; C Daly 0-1; D Kennedy 0-1; E O’Connor 0-1; D McNamara 0-1.	Report	E Doughan 1-5 (0-2f, 0-1 ’65); P Ryan 0-5 (frees); P Cahalan 0-3; P Hackett 0-2; E Tucker 0-2; P McCormack 0-1 (free); S Cleary 0-1; A Duff 0-1; L McKeogh 0-1.

5 November 2025 Round 2	Nenagh CBS	4-18 - 1-19	Ardscoil Rís	Lacken Park
	E Doughan (0-12, 9 frees, 1 65); P Ryan (2-1); P Cahalan (1-4); É Tucker (1-0); E Jones (0-1).	Report	J Cosgrove (0-8, 1 free, 1 65); J O’Keeffe (0-6, 6 frees); A Kearns (1-0 free); C Ryan (Ahane) (0-2); M McKenna, I O’Brien, S Waters (0-1 each).

5 November 2025 Round 2	Cashel Community School	1-12 - 4-26	St Flannan's College	UL Grounds, North Campus
	S Mackey 1-3 (3f); C Fogarty 0-2; C Hall (free), N O’Flynn, E Ryan, A Toomey, S Cooney, C Walsh, J Finn 0-1 each.	Report	H Doherty 2-7 (3f); E O’Connor 1-3; D McNamara 1-2; P Finneran 0-4; C Daly, J Keane Hayes, D Loftus 0-2 each; R Ralph, G Ball, I Hassett, J Barry 0-1 each.

19 November 2025 Round 3	Cashel Community School	0-08 - 7-18	Nenagh CBS	UL Grounds, North Campus
	S Cooney (0-3); S Mackey (0-3; 2f); A Toomey (0-1); J Finn (0-1).	Report	E Doughan (2-8; 4f, 1 ’65); P Cahalan (2-1); E Jones (1-1); P Hackett (1-1); P Ryan (1-0); B O’Brien (0-2); E Tucker (0-2); H Healy (0-1); E Grace (0-1); D O’Dwyer (0-1)

19 November 2025 Round 3	St Flannan's College	1-19 - 0-18	Ardscoil Rís	Clarecastle Grounds
	H Doherty 1-6 (4f, 1’65); P Finneran 0-3; E O’Connor, G Ball, R Ralph 0-2 each; I Hassett, D McNamara, B Talty, J Barry 0-1 each	Report	A Kearns 0-6 (6f); J Cosgrove, J O’Connor 0-3 each: C Ryan (Ahane) (0-2 each); M McKenna, D O’Keeffe, J O’Keeffe, G O’Brien 0-1 each

== Group 2 ==
=== Group 2 table ===
Knockout stage

Team	Matches				Score			Pts
Team	Pld	W	D	L	For	Against	Diff	Pts
Midleton CBS	3	2	1	0	63	51	12	5
De La Salle College	3	2	0	1	64	62	2	4
St Colman's College	3	1	1	1	64	62	2	3
CBS High School Clonmel	2	0	0	1	63	79	-16	0

=== Group 2 results ===
15 October 2025 Round 1	Midleton CBS	0-19 - 0-19	St Colman's College	Páirc Lios gCúl
	F Daly 0-9 (0-5 f), C Stack 0-3, E Connolly, S Ring 0-2 each, S Murtagh, B Geary, D Heavin 0-1 each.	Report	C Barry 0-10 (0-8 f), S McCarthy 0-3, J O’Keeffe 0-2 (0-1 f), O Hegarty, J Counihan, M Kenny 0-1 each.

15 October 2025 Round 1	De La Salle College	1-24 - 2-19	CBS High School Clonmel	Cappoquin Logistics Fraher Field
	J Shanahan (1-8; 0-5f); O Fives (0-5); T Ryan, C O’Brien and S Power (0-3 each); J Power and M Moloney (0-1 each)	Report	A Cagney (0-8; 0-5f; 0-1 ‘65); C Morrisson (1-3); M McGuire (1-0); F Napier, B Roche, J Yousif, H Lawlor (0-2 each)

5 November 2025 Round 2	CBS High School Clonmel	0-20 - 3-15	Midleton CBS	Cappoquin Sportsfield
	A Cagney 0-14 (0-12 f, 0-1 65), C Morrisson 0-3, M McGuire 0-2, B Morrisson 0-1.	Report	C Deane 2-2, F Daly 0-7 (0-6 f), J Devoy 1-1, M McSweeney 0-2, Tom A Walsh, S Ring, E Connolly 0-1 each.

5 November 2025 Round 2	St Colman's College	2-11 - 0-25	De La Salle College	Cappoquin Logistics Fraher Field
	Cormac Barry 0-4 f, T McCarthy 0-3, R Donovan, D Fitzgerald 1-0 each, D Barry, F O’Driscoll, C O’Riordan, J Counihan 0-1 each.	Report	E Burke 0-9 (0-8 f), S Power 0-6, M Moloney, O Fives 0-3 each, D Keane, J Power, J Shanahan (f), D Hickey 0-1 each.

19 November 2025 Round 3	St Colman's College	3-19 - 1-15	CBS High School Clonmel	Canon Hayes Park
	Cormac Barry 0-12 (0-11 f, 0-1 65), R Donovan, D Fitzgerald 1-1 each, A Lardner 0-3, O Hegarty 1-0, T McCarthy, C O’Riordan 0-1 each.	Report	A Cagney 0-8 f, C Morrison 0-5 (0-1 f), M McGuire 1-0, B Morrison, B Roche 0-1 each.

19 November 2025 Round 3	Midleton CBS	2-14 - 0-12	De La Salle College	Fethard Town Park
	F Daly 1-6 (0-4 f), Tom C Walsh 0-3 (0-1 puckout), S Ring 1-0, C Garde, C Stack, S Carroll, Tom A Walsh, E Connolly 0-1 each.	Report	E Burke 0-6 (0-4 f), S Power 0-2, O Fives, C O’Callaghan, M Moloney, J Walsh 0-1 each.

== Group 3 ==
=== Group 3 table ===
Knockout stage

Team	Matches				Score			Pts
Team	Pld	W	D	L	For	Against	Diff	Pts
Thurles CBS	3	3	0	0	97	44	53	6
Blackwater CS	3	2	0	1	58	64	-6	2
John the Baptist CS	3	1	0	1	47	61	-14	2
Scoil na Tríonóide Naofa	3	0	0	3	59	76	-17	0

=== Group 3 results ===
15 October 2025 Round 1	Scoil na Tríonóide Naofa	1-14 - 3-17	Blackwater Community School	Goatenbridge Grounds
	D Crowe (0-6, 2 frees, 1 65); R McGrath (0-4, 4 frees); J McLoughlin (1-0); J Dawson (0-3); C Kenny (0-1).	Report	B Cummins (1-11, 1-0 penalty, 0-8 frees, 0-1 65); A Cummins, S Óg Costin (1-1 each); J McDonnell (0-2); H Quann, J Twomey (0-1 each).

15 October 2025 Round 1	Thurles CBS	0-24 - 0-15	John the Baptist CS	Páirc Ciocaim
	C Minogue (0-10, 6f), Tiarnán Ryan 0-4, Tony Ryan 0-3, J Butler, D Barry (0-2 each), D Hickey, D Doyle 0-1 (each), J Cahill (0-1f)	Report	T Ryan (0-6, 5f), R McNamara 0-4, S O’Dea 0-3, M Hanly 0-1, C O’Dwyer 0-1

5 November 2025 Round 2	John the Baptist CS	2-14 - 1-09	Scoil na Tríonóide Naofa	FitzGerald Park
	T Ryan (1-5, 0-5 frees), R Hanly (1-0), W Ryan (frees) and S O’Dea (0-2 each), J O’Riordan, C Higgins, E Martin, K Hennessy and C Shanahan (0-1 each).	Report	C Kenny (1-0), D Crowe (0-2 frees) and C Gantley (0-3 each), D Blackmore (0-2), J McLoughlin (0-1).

5 November 2025 Round 2	Blackwater Community School	0-07 - 2-29	Thurles CBS	Goatenbridge Grounds
	B Cummins 0-4f, J McDonnell, H Quann, B Scanlon all 0-1 each.	Report	T Ryan (0-12, 0-2f), C Dunne 1-4, C Minogue (0-6, 0-5f), J Cahill (1-2, 1-0 sl-cut, 0-2f), E Murray, E Hickey 0-2 each, L Donoghue 0-1.	Referee: W Fitzharris

19 November 2025 Round 3	Thurles CBS	4-26 - 3-13	Scoil na Tríonóide Naofa	UL Grounds, Sports Campus
	J Butler 1-5, L Donoghue 1-4, T Ryan 1-2, J Cahill 0-5 (5f), E Hickey 0-5 (2f), L Collins 1-0, T Ryan 0-2, D Doyle, B Fogarty and D Ryan 0-1 each.	Report	D Crowe 1-5 (5f), C Kenny 1-0, G Maher 1-0, C Gantley 0-3, E Richardson 0-2, J Dawson, D Long, D Coughlan and S Hanley 0-1 each.

19 November 2025 Round 3	Blackwater Community School	2-19 - 0-12	John the Baptist CS	Castlelyons Grounds
	B Cummins 1-14 (7f, 2 65), L Mulhall 1-1, S Óg Costín, H Quann, A Cummins, D O’Brien 0-1 each.	Report	T Ryan 0-9 (5f, 1 65), R Hanly, W Ryan, S O’Dea 0-1 each

== Group 4 ==
=== Group 4 table ===
Knockout stage

Team	Matches				Score			Pts
Team	Pld	W	D	L	For	Against	Diff	Pts
St Joseph's SS	3	2	1	0	70	56	14	5
Our Lady's SS	3	2	0	1	66	62	4	4
Gaelcholáiste Mhuire AG	3	1	1	1	64	64	0	3
Christian Brothers College	3	0	0	3	61	79	-18	0

=== Group 4 results ===
15 October 2025 Round 1	Our Lady's Secondary School	2-19 - 0-20	Christian Brothers College	Knocklong Grounds
	J Bevans 1-9 (1-7 f), P O’Dwyer 1-2, B Coffey, S Gleeson 0-2 each, B Collier, C Broderick, S Walsh, J Ryan 0-1 each.	Report	E O’Shea 0-13 (0-6 f), C Lawton 0-3, B Hegarty 0-2, M Quill, M T Brosnan 0-1 each.

15 October 2025 Round 1	Gaelcholáiste Mhuire AG	1-16 - 0-19	St Joseph's Secondary School	FitzGerald Park
	G Ó Ceallacháin 1-8 (0-6 f, 1-0 sdl, 0-1 65), C Ó Suilleabháin 0-4 (0-2 f), L Ó Muirthile 0-2, E Mac Eochán, S Ó Cathaláin 0-1 each.	Report	M Corbett 0-14 (0-12 f, 0-1 65), L Murphy, A O’Driscoll, C Leamy, M Vaughan, J O’Connor 0-1 each.

5 November 2025 Round 2	St Joseph's Secondary School	1-21 - 3-12	Our Lady's Secondary School	Cappamore Grounds
	M Corbett 0-9 (4f, 1 ’65), J O’Connor 1-1, L Murphy, J O’Donnell and M Vaughan 0-3 each, C Leamy and C Maxted 0-1 each.	Report	J Bevans 0-7 (6f), P O’Shea and P O’Dwyer 1-2 each, S Gleeson 0-1.

5 November 2025 Round 2	Christian Brothers College	2-19 - 2-21	Gaelcholáiste Mhuire AG	Páirc Uí Chaoimh All Weather Pitch
	E O’Shea (1-6, 0-4 frees); S Hurley (1-2); J Murray, M Murphy, M Quill (0-2 each); J Hegarty, B Hegarty, M Brosnan (free) C Lawton, B Power (0-1 each).	Report	C Ó Súilleabháin (1-5, 0-1 free); G Ó Ceallacháin (0-8, 0-6 frees, 0-1 ‘65); C Ó Cofaigh (1-2); T Ó Buadau (0-2); R Ó Cróinín, SJ Ó Dalaigh, J Ó Brosnacháin, R Ó Buachalla (0-1 each).

19 November 2025 Round 3	St Joseph's Secondary School	2-21 - 1-13	Christian Brothers College	FitzGerald Park
	M Corbett (0-11, 0-7 frees), M Vaughan and J O’Donnell (1-2 each), C Leamy (0-2), Ó Perill, J O’Connor, A O’Driscoll and L Murphy (0-1 each).	Report	E O’Shea (0-6, 0-1 free), D Rowley (1-0), C Lawton (0-3, 0-1 free), M T Brosnan, M Quill, M O’Mahony and S Hurley (0-1 each).

19 November 2025 Round 3	Our Lady's Secondary School	1-17 - 1-15	Gaelcholáiste Mhuire AG	Fethard Town Park
	J Bevans 0-10 f, S Walsh 1-0, C Brocderick 0-2, P O’Shea, S Gleeson, D Coffey, J Ryan, P O’Dwyer 0-1 each.	Report	G Ó Ceallacháin (0-3 f, 0-2 65), C Ó Súilleabháin (0-3 f) 0-5 each, L Ó Muirthile 1-0, C Ó Cofaigh 0-2, J Ó Brosnacháin, E Mac Eochán 0-1 each.

== Knockout stage ==
=== Quarter-finals ===
7 January 2026 Quarter-final	St Joseph's Secondary School	0-18 - 0-14	Blackwater Community School	FitzGerald Park
	M Corbett (0-10, 0-9 frees), J O’Donnell (0-4), J O’Connor (0-3), A O’Driscoll (0-1).	Report	B Cummins (0-9, 0-6 frees), C Nicholson (0-4), L Mulhall (0-1 sl).

7 January 2026 Quarter-final	Thurles CBS	2-13 - 0-16	De La Salle College	Castlelyons Grounds
	J Butler (2-1); C Minogue (0-5, 0-3 frees); C Dunne (free), E Murray (0-2 each); D Barry, Tony Ryan, Tiarnán Ryan (0-1 each).	Report	J Shanahan (0-5, 0-5 frees); S Power (0-3); O Fives (0-2); D Keane, C O’Brien, A Power, D Doyle, M Moloney, J Walsh (0-1 each).

7 January 2026 Quarter-final	Midleton CBS	2-14 - 3-19	Nenagh CBS	Canon Hayes Park
	C Deane 0-5, S Ring 1-2 (0-1 f), F Daly 0-4 f, C Garde 1-1, T A Walsh, D Murphy 0-1 each.	Report	E Doughan 1-14 (0-8 f, 1-0 pen, 0-1 65), A Duff, B O’Brien 1-0 each, P Cahalan, L McKeogh, P McCormack (f), E Tucker, J Grace 0-1 each.

9 January 2026 Quarter-final	St Flannan's College	2-20 - 1-19	Our Lady's Secondary School	TUS Moylish Campus
	D McNamara 1-4, H Doherty 0-6 (4f), G Ball 0-5, T O’Connor 1-1, I Hassett 0-2, E O’Connor and J Cullinan 0-1 each.	Report	J Bevans 0-9 (8f), P O’Shea 1-4, P O’Dwyer and J Marnell 0-2 each, S Burke and S Gleeson 0-1 each.

=== Semi-finals ===
17 January 2026 Semi-final	Thurles CBS	0-20 - 1-18	Nenagh CBS	Fr Kenyon Park
	J Cahill 0-5 (2 frees, 2 s-cuts); C Minogue 0-4 frees; Tony Ryan, Tiarnan Ryan 0-3 each; E Hickey, R Bargary, E Murray, C Dunne, J Butler 0-1 each.	Report	E Doughan 0-12 (6 frees, 1 ’65); E Tucker 1-0; P Hackett 0-2; P McCormack (free), B O’Brien, P Cahalan, H Healy 0-1 each.

17 January 2026 Semi-final	St Joseph's Secondary School	3-11 - 2-19	St Flannan's College	Zimmer Biomet Páirc Chiosóg
	M Corbett 1-5 (1-3f); J O’Donnell 0-3; L Murphy, J O’Connor 1-0 each; R Hayes, Cl Leamy, M Vaughan 0-1 each.	Report	H Doherty 0-7 (5f); D McNamara, T O’Connor 1-1 each; G Ball, E O’Connor 0-3 each; P Finneran 0-2; J Barry, B Talty 0-1 each.

=== Final ===
31 January 2026 Final	St Flannan's College	0-18 - 0-20	Nenagh CBS	Zimmer Biomet Páirc Chiosóg
	H Doherty (0-8, 0-5 frees, 0-1 ‘65); D McNamara (0-3); T O’Connor (0-2); C Daly, G Ball, I Hassett, P Finneran, E O’Connor (0-1 each).	Report	E Doughan (0-12, 0-8 frees); A Duff, P Hackett, J O’Dwyer (0-2 each); D O’Dwyer, P Ryan (0-1 each).	Referee: T Walsh (Waterford)

== Statistics ==
=== Top scorers ===
Rank	Player	Club	Tally	Total	Matches	Average
1	Eoghan Doughan	Nenagh CBS	4-63	75	6	12.50
2	Matthew Corbett	St Joseph's SS	1-49	52	5	10.40
3	Harry Doherty	St Flannan's College	3-42	51	6	8.50
4	Ben Cummins	Blackwater CS	2-39	44	4	11.00
5	Jack Bevans	Our Lady's SS	1-35	38	4	9.50
6	Aaron Cagney	CBS HS Clonmel	0-30	30	3	10.00
7	Fionn Daly	Midleton CBS	1-26	29	4	7.25
8	Eoghan O'Shea	CBC Cork	1-25	28	3	9.33
9	Cormac Barry	St Colman's College	0-26	26	3	8.66
10	Cathal Minogue	Thurles CBS	0-25	25	4	6.25
