= 2026–27 Harty Cup =

Hurling tournament

2026–27 Dr Harty Cup
- Dates: 12 October 2026 – January 2027
- Teams: 16
- Sponsor: TUS

Tournament statistics
- Matches played: 24
- Goals scored: 50 (2.08 per match)
- Points scored: 764 (31.83 per match)
- Top scorer: Mikey Corridan (1-31)

The 2026–27 Dr Harty Cup is the 106th staging of the Harty Cup since its establishment by the Munster Council of the Gaelic Athletic Association in 1918. The draw for the group stage took place on 22 August 2026. The competition is scheduled to run from 13 October 2026 to January 2027.

Nenagh CBS are the defending champions.

== Group 1 ==
=== Group 1 table ===
Knockout stage

Team	Matches				Score			Pts
Team	Pld	W	D	L	For	Against	Diff	Pts
Thurles CBS	3	2	0	1	83	63	20	4
De La Salle Waterford	3	2	0	1	73	66	7	4
Tralee CBS	3	1	0	2	62	75	-13	2
Cashel Community School	3	1	0	2	52	66	-14	2

=== Group 1 results ===
13 October 2026 Round 1	Tralee CBS	2-17 - 1-15	Cashel Community School	Páirc Caoimhín Ó Luing
	M Corridon (1-6, 1f), S Shanahan (0-6, frees), L Hanafin (1-0), M O’Sullivan (0-2, 2fs), J Gaynor (0-2), A Relihan (0-1).	Report	D O’Callaghan (0-6, 4fs), S Mackey (1-0), E Ryan (0-2), C Hall (0-2, 1f), B Fitzgerald, C Fitzgerald, C Fogarty, H Hickey and B McLoughlin (0-1 each).

16 October 2026 Round 1	Thurles CBS	2-27 - 2-17	De La Salle College Waterford	Michael Hogan Community Sportsfield
	C Dunne (1-8, 0-7f), S Griffin 1-3, J Cahill (0-6, 0-3f), D Barry, D Doyle, O Fogarty, E Kennedy all 0-2 each, D O’Dwyer, C Kennedy (CR) 0-1 each.	Report	J Shanahan (0-10, 0-8f), D Hickey 1-1, J O’Sullivan 1-0, J Mullally 0-2, A Power, A Mills, D Ryan, J Walsh 0-1 each.

4 November 2026 Round 2	Cashel Community School	1-17 - 2-12	Thurles CBS	Boherlahan Grounds
	C Fogarty (0-4, 0-2f), E Ryan 1-1, D O'Callaghan (0-2, 0-1f), C Fitzgerald, S Cooney, U O'Donoghue 0-2 each, C Hall 0-1f, B McLoughlin, S Mackey, J Donnelly all 0-1 each.	Report	C Dunne (0-6, 0-4f), J Cahill (0-3, 0-2f), Z O'Keeffe, D O'Dwyer 1-0 each, E Kennedy 0-2, A Darmody 0-1.

4 November 2026 Round 2	De La Salle College Waterford	1-22 - 0-19	Tralee CBS	Midleton Park South
	J Shanahan (0-12, 0-5 frees, 0-1 65), A Power (1-3), J Mullally (0-3), M Moloney (0-2), C Crowley and D Ryan (0-1 each).	Report	M Corridon (0-12, 0-9 frees, 0-1 65), S Shanahan (0-1 pen) and J Gaynor (0-3 each), L Hanafin (0-1).

18 November 2026 Round 3	Thurles CBS	4-20 - 1-17	Tralee CBS	Páirc Caoimhín Ó Luing
	J Cahill 0-9, 7fs, D O’Dwyer 1-4, D Doyle (2-0), C Lawlor (1-0), A Darmody and C Dunne (2f) (0-2 each)), E Kennedy, C Kennedy and C Lillis (0-1 each).	Report	M Corridon (0-13, 12fs), S Shanahan (1-2), M O’Sullivan (f) and L Hannafin (0-1).

18 November 2026 Round 3	Cashel Community School	0-14 - 2-19	De La Salle College Waterford	Páirc na n-Ealaí
	C Fogarty (0-6, 0-5 frees), S Mackey (0-5 frees), C Hall (0-2), J Finn and H Hickey (0-1 each).	Report	J Shanahan (1-7, 0-5 frees), J Power (1-1), M Moloney (0-4), J Mullaly, A Power and S Kavanagh (0-2 each), J Comerford (0-1 free).

== Group 2 ==
=== Group 2 table ===
Knockout stage

Team	Matches				Score			Pts
Team	Pld	W	D	L	For	Against	Diff	Pts
Nenagh CBS	3	2	1	0	67	53	14	5
Midleton CBS	3	1	1	1	53	59	-6	3
Ardscoil Rís	3	1	1	1	58	58	0	3
Gaelcholáiste Mhuire AG	3	0	1	2	42	50	-8	1

=== Group 2 results ===
15 October 2026 Round 1	Nenagh CBS	4-20 - 1-18	Midleton CBS	FitzGerald Park
	KJ Dunne 3-4 (0-2 f), T Boland 1-3, É Tucker, R McGrath, J Moroney (0-1 f) 0-3 each, J O’Dwyer 0-2, M Hutchinson, C Cairns 0-1 each.	Report	C Deane 1-2, S Ring, B Geary (0-3f) 0-4 each, A Hennessy, Tom C Walsh (f) 0-2 each, C Ronayne, F Connaughton, Tom A Walsh, E Connolly 0-1

16 October 2026 Round 1	Ardscoil Rís	0-22 - 1-16	Gaelcholáiste Mhuire AG	Castlelyons Grounds
	S Waters (0-8, 0-1 65, 0-5 frees), A Kearns and E O’Sullivan (0-3 each), D Moran and G O’Brien (0-2 each), C Butler, E Hennessy, I O’Brien and R Collins (0-1 each).	Report	C Ó Cofaigh (1-9, 0-6 frees), G Ó Ceallacháin (0-2, 0-1 free, 0-1 65), M Mac An Ghaill, N Ó Cofaigh, C Ó Cuinneagáin, D De Barra and J Ó Cathaláin (0-1 each).

4 November 2026 Round 2	Gaelcholáiste Mhuire AG	0-12 - 0-12	Nenagh CBS	Knocklong Sportsfield
	C Ó Cuinneagáin 0-4, N Ó Cofaigh, S de Búrca 0-2 each, C Ó Cofaigh, J Ó Cathaláin, S Ó Meachair, G Ó Ceallacháin (0-1f) 0-1 each.	Report	KJ Dunne 0-8 (0-6f), J Grace, J Moroney, T Boland, M Hutchinson 0-1 each.

4 November 2026 Round 2	Midleton CBS	1-13 - 0-16	Ardscoil Rís	FitzGerald Park
	Tom C Walsh (1-3, 1-0 pen, 0-3 f), B Geary (0-6, 0-5 f), C Deane, C Ronayne, J O’Sullivan, A Fogarty (0-1 each).	Report	A Kearns (0-7, 0-5 f), S Waters (0-4, 0-2 f), T Slattery (0-3), E O’Sullivan (0-2).

18 November 2026 Round 3	Nenagh CBS	2-17 - 1-17	Ardscoil Rís	Lacken Park
	S Waters 0-6 (4f); A Kearns 0-4 (1f); I O’Brien 1-1; D Moran 0-2; R Horgan, E O’Sullivan, E Hennessy, S McCarthy 0-1 each.	Report	J Moroney 1-10 (0-9f); C Kennedy 0-4 (1f, 1 65); M Hutchinson 1-1; E Tucker, J Grace 0-1 each.

18 November 2026 Round 3	Gaelcholáiste Mhuire AG	0-11 - 2-10	Midleton CBS	Castlelyons Grounds
	C Coffey (0-2f), G Ó Ceallacháin (0-2f, 0-1 65) 0-3 each, D de Barra 0-2, R Ó Buachalla, S Ó Meachair, S de Búrca 0-1 each.	Report	J O’Sullivan 1-1, S Ring 0-3, C Deane 1-0, C Ronayne 0-2, B Geary (0-1 65), Tom A Walsh, Tom C Walsh (0-1f), D Sheahan 0-1 each.

== Group 3 ==
=== Group 3 table ===
Knockout stage

Team	Matches				Score			Pts
Team	Pld	W	D	L	For	Against	Diff	Pts
St Flannan's College	3	3	0	0	81	48	33	6
Christian Brothers College	3	2	0	1	61	45	16	4
Our Lady's SS	3	1	0	2	43	63	-20	2
John the Baptist CS	3	0	0	3	39	68	-29	0

=== Group 3 results ===
13 October 2026 Round 1	St Flannan's College	2-28 - 1-14	Our Lady's Secondary School	TUS Moylish Campus
	C Coffey (0-9, 0-4f, 0-1 65), E O’Connor 2-2, D Mahon, G Ball, F Duignan all 0-3 each, B Talty, R O’Donnell, S Dileen all 0-2 each, C Daly, L Vaughan 0-1 each.	Report	P O’Shea (1-8, 1-6f), P O’Dwyer (0-3, 0-1f), S Burke 0-2, M Campion 0-1.

22 October 2026 Round 1	Christian Brothers College	2-22 - 0-12	John the Baptist Community School	Castlelyons Grounds
	T Huggins 0-7 (0-1f), B Hegarty 1-2, M Quill 0-4f, C O’Flynn 0-3, J Norton 1-0, M Murphy (0-2f), D O’Donovan 0-2 each, C Kelly, H Raftery 0-1 each.	Report	C Higgins 0-6 (0-4f), S Mitchell 0-2, M Hanly (0-1f), C O’Dwyer (0-1f), K Quinn, J Ryan 0-1 each.

4 November 2026 Round 2	Our Lady's Secondary School	0-14 - 0-18	Christian Brothers College	Canon Hayes Park
	P O’Shea (0-6, 6 frees), J Bevans (0-4, 3 frees), J Noonan (0-2), P O’Dwyer (0-1), S Burke (0-1).	Report	M Murphy (0-6, 5 frees), M Quill (0-6, 5 frees), B Hegarty (0-3), T Huggins (0-1), C O’Flynn (0-1), D O’Donovan (0-1).

4 November 2026 Round 2	St Flannan's College	3-19 - 0-16	John the Baptist Community School	TUS Moylish Campus
	L Vaughan 2-1; R O’Donnell 1-2; B Talty 0-4; G Ball (1f), C Coffey (2f) 0-3 each; I Hassett, D Mahon 0-2 each; F Daffey, R Ralph 0-1 each.	Report	J O’Riordan 0-5 (3f); C Higgins 0-4 (4f); M Hanly (1f), S O’Dwyer 0-2 each; C Shanahan, C Cleary, J Ryan 0-1 each;

18 November 2026 Round 3	John the Baptist Community School	0-11 - 1-09	Our Lady's Secondary School	Páirc na nGael
	C Higgins 0-4 (3f), J Ryan, C Shanahan and M Hanly 0-2 each, S O’Dwyer 0-1;	Report	P O’Shea 0-6 (5f), D Coffey 1-0, C Ryan 0-2 (2f), P Stapleton 0-1.

18 November 2026 Round 3	St Flannan's College	1-16 - 0-15	Christian Brothers College	Knocklong Sportsfield
	C Coffey 0-8 (0-6 f, 0-1 65), G Ball 0-4 (0-3 f), E O’Connor 1-0, D Mahon, B Talty, L Vaughan, F Plunkett 0-1 each.	Report	M Quill 0-10 (0-9 f), M Murphy (0-1 f), G Kingston, T Huggins, H Raftery, B Power 0-1 each.

== Group 4 ==
=== Group 4 table ===
Knockout stage

Team	Matches				Score			Pts
Team	Pld	W	D	L	For	Against	Diff	Pts
St Colman's College	3	3	0	0	57	43	14	6
St Joseph's SS	3	1	1	1	53	49	4	3
Blackwater CS	3	1	1	1	49	46	3	3
Castletroy College	3	0	0	3	42	63	-21	0

=== Group 4 results ===
12 October 2026 Round 1	St Colman's College	0-22 - 2-14	Castletroy College	Knocklong Sportsfield
	A Cotter 0-9 (0-7f), S McCarthy 0-5, M Kenny 0-3, T McCarthy 0-2, C Barry, M Walsh, O Hegarty 0-1 each.	Report	C McCarthy 0-9 (0-7f, 0-1sl), S Moloughney, C Ryan 1-0 each, J Moynihan, L Ferland 0-2 each, C Langan 0-1 each.

12 October 2026 Round 1	St Joseph's Secondary School	1-16 - 2-13	Blackwater Community School	FitzGerald Park
	H Vaughan 0-6.	Report

4 November 2026 Round 2	St Colman's College	1-11 - 1-08	Blackwater Community School	Castlelyons Grounds
	A Cotter 0-5 f, M Kenny 1-1, S McCarthy 0-4, T McCarthy 0-1.	Report	S Landers 1-0, H Quann 0-3, F O’Connor 0-2 (1f), P Hegarty, S Óg Costin, K Dunne 0-1 each.

4 November 2026 Round 2	St Joseph's Secondary School	2-16 - 0-09	Castletroy College	Cratloe Grounds
	J O’Donnell 1-4, H Vaughan 0-4 (3f), N Belenko 1-0, M McGrath 0-3 (1f), D Lenihan 0-2, O Perill, L Jennings and E O’Connor 0-1 each.	Report	C McCarthy 0-6 (6f), F Ó Duinn, S Moloughney and J Sheahan 0-1 each;

18 November 2026 Round 3	St Joseph's Secondary School	1-09 - 0-21	St Colman's College	TUS Moylish Campus
	D Lenihan (1-0); H Vaughan (0-3, 2 frees); M McGrath (1 free), J O’Donnell (0-2 each); P Murphy (free), O Perill (0-1 each).	Report	A Cotter (0-9, 1 frees); S McCarthy (0-5); O Hegarty, M Kenny (0-2 each); C Barry, D Twomey, M Walsh (0-1 each).

18 November 2026 Round 3	Castletroy College	0-13 - 0-19	Blackwater Community School	Canon Hayes Park
	C McCarthy 0-6 (4f, 1 ‘65); C Langan 0-3 (2f); S Moloughney 0-2; B Hurley and J Sheehan 0-1 each.	Report	S Og Costin 0-9 (5f); H Quann 0-3 (2f); C Moore and P Hegarty 0-2 each; C Lynch, S Landers and A Cummins 0-1 each.

== Statistics ==
=== Top scorers ===
#	Player	Club	Tally	Total	Matches	Average
1	Mikey Corridon	Tralee CBS	1-31	34	3	11.33
2	Jamie Shanahan	DLS College	1-29	32	3	10.66
3	Pádraic O'Shea	Our Lady's SS	1-20	23	3	7.66
3	Alan Cotter	St Colman's College	0-23	23	3	7.66
5	K. J. Dunne	Nenagh CBS	3-12	21	3	7.00
5	Cian McCarthy	Castletroy College	0-21	21	3	7.00
7	Michael Quill	CBC Cork	0-20	20	3	6.66
7	Conor Coffey	St Flannan's College	0-20	20	3	6.66
9	Chris Dunne	Thurles CBS	1-16	19	3	6.33
10	Jack Cahill	Thurles CBS	0-18	18	3	6.00
10	Shane Waters	Ardscoil Rís	0-18	18	3	6.00

=== Miscellaneous ===
- Tralee CBS beat Cashel Community School in round 1 in what was the first ever win in the competition for a Kerry school.
