= Dean Ryan Cup =

Hurling competition

- Irish: Corn Dhéin Uí Riain
- Code: Hurling
- Founded: 1936; 89 years ago
- Region: Munster (GAA)
- Trophy: Dean Ryan Cup
- No. of teams: 11
- Title holders: Ardscoil Rís (4th title)
- First winner: Thurles CBS
- Most titles: Thurles CBS (14 titles)
- Sponsors: TUS
- Official website: Official website

The Dean Ryan Cup is an annual inter-schools hurling competition organised by the Munster PPS division of the Gaelic Athletic Association (GAA). Sometimes referred to throughout its history as the Munster Colleges Junior Hurling Championship or the Munster PPS Under-17 A Hurling Championship, it has been contested since 1936.

The final, typically held in November, serves as the culmination of a knockout series of games played between October and November. Eligible players must be under the age of 17.

As of 2025, 11 teams participate in the Dean Ryan Cup. The title has been won at least once by 19 different schools, 11 of which have won the title more than once. Thurles CBS are the all-time title record-holders at 14 times.

Midleton CBS were the 2024 champions, having beaten Gaelcholáiste Mhuire AG by 5-15 to 1-11 in the final.

== History ==
Since 1918, the Dr Harty Cup had been organised by the Munster Colleges Council and contested as a provincial senior hurling competition. At the annual Munster Colleges Council convention on 1 February 1936, it was decided to establish a provincial junior hurling competition for players under the age of 16. Monsignor Ryan, Dean of Cashel, donated a cup for the competition and it was named in his honour. Thurles CBS were the first champions after a 9–04 to 3–02 defeat of Mount Sion CBS in the inaugural final in April 1936.

== Roll of honour ==
Rank	Team	Won	Years
1	Thurles CBS	14	1936, 1939, 1945, 1947, 1950, 1952, 1955, 1956, 1960, 1965, 1992, 2010, 2018, 2019
2	St Colman's College	13	1970, 1972, 1977, 1979, 1983, 1993, 1994, 1995, 2000, 2001, 2003, 2017, 2020
2	St Flannan's College	13	1957, 1961, 1962, 1967, 1973, 1976, 1988, 1997, 1999, 2004, 2006, 2011, 2022
4	North Monastery	10	1958, 1959, 1971, 1975, 1978, 1980, 1981, 1984, 1985, 1990
5	Midleton CBS	8	1940, 1948, 1949, 1986, 1989, 2014, 2015, 2025
6	Limerick CBS	6	1937, 1938, 1954, 1964, 1966, 1968
7	Ardscoil Rís	4	2009, 2016, 2023, 2026
8	St Finbarr's College	3	1969, 1982, 1998
8	De La Salle College	3	2005, 2008, 2013
10	Dungarvan CBS	2	1951, 1953
10	Scariff Community College	2	1991, 1996
12	Rice College	1	1941
12	Coláiste Chríost Rí	1	1963
12	Coláiste Iognáid Rís	1	1974
12	Abbey CBS	1	1987
12	Cashel Community School	1	2002
12	Our Lady's Secondary School	1	2007
12	Blackwater Community School	1	2012
12	Nenagh CBS	1	2024

== List of finals ==
Year	Winners	Score	Runners-up	Score
1936	Thurles CBS	9-04	Mount Sion CBS	3-02
1937	Limerick CBS	3-05	Rockwell College	4-01
1938				
1939	Thurles CBS	w/o	Lismore CBS	scr.
1940	Midleton CBS			
1941	Ennis CBS	5-03	Thurles CBS	4-02
1942	No competition			
1943	No competition			
1944	No competition			
1945	Thurles CBS	5-06	Dungarvan CBS	2-01
1946	Competition not completed			
1947	Thurles CBS	5-03	St Therese College	4-02
1948	Midleton CBS	6-00	Limerick CBS	5-02
1949	Midleton CBS	9-02	Charleville CBS	4-00
1950	Thurles CBS	12-04	Sullivan's Quay CBS	0-01
1951	Dungarvan CBS	5-01	Thurles CBS	4-07
1952	Thurles CBS	6-04	Dungarvan CBS	6-02
1953	Dungarvan CBS	6-03	Sullivan's Quay CBS	0-02
1954	Limerick CBS	4-05	Dungarvan CBS	3-03
1955	Thurles CBS	3-04	Mount Sion CBS	3-01
1956	Thurles CBS	7-13	Mount Sion CBS	3-03
1957	St Flannan's College	8-09	Thurles CBS	1-07
1958	North Monastery	3-08	St Flannan's College	2-08
1959	North Monastery	6-05	St Flannan's College	0-01
1960	Thurles CBS	6-08	North Monastery	8-00
1961	St Flannan's College	6-07	De La Salle College	1-03
1962	St Flannan's College	11-05	St Finbarr's College	0-02
1963	Coláiste Chríost Rí	2-10	De La Salle College	4-03
1964	Limerick CBS	1-09	Coláiste Chríost Rí	2-01
1965	Thurles CBS	5-06	St Finbarr's College	6-02
1966	Limerick CBS	5-07	North Monastery	4-05
1967	St Flannan's College	10-10	St Finbarr's College	5-04
1968	Limerick CBS	8-09	St Colman's College	2-04
1969	St Finbarr's College	3-17	St Colman's College	4-07
1970	St Colman's College	5-09	Limerick CBS	3-04
1971	North Monastery	1-16	St Colman's College	2-08
1972	St Colman's College	4-05	St Flannan's College	2-07
1973	St Flannan's College	3-14	St Colman's College	3-06
1974	Coláiste Iognáid Rís	2-07	North Monastery	1-08
1975	North Monastery	1-08	Thurles CBS	2-03
1976	St Flannan's College	3-07	Limerick CBS	0-10
1977	St Colman's College	1-08	De La Salle College	0-09
1978	North Monastery	4-05	Templemore CBS	1-09
1979	St Colman's College	4-07	De La Salle College	2-07
1980	North Monastery	7-11	St Flannan's College	3-01
1981	North Monastery	2-07	St Flannan's College	0-12
1982	St Finbarr's College	1-09	St Colman's College	1-05
1983	St Colman's College	1-08	North Monastery	2-01
1984	North Monastery	3-04	De La Salle College	1-06
1985	North Monastery	1-06	Midleton CBS	1-03
1986	Midleton CBS	2-09	St Flannan's College	2-06
1987	Abbey CBS	2-05	Midleton CBS	1-06
1988	St Flannan's College	3-14	Abbey CBS	0-04
1989	Midleton CBS	1-13	North Monastery	1-08
1990	North Monastery	3-13	Limerick CBS	3-04
1991	Scariff Community College	2-12	St Flannan's College	0-07
1992	Thurles CBS	5-13	Limerick CBS	2-04
1993	St Colman's College	2-05	Abbey CBS	0-08
1994	St Colman's College	1-08	Abbey CBS	1-03
1995	St Colman's College	1-09	Midleton CBS	1-07
1996	Scariff Community College	0-10	Midleton CBS	1-06
1997	St Flannan's College	1-09	St Flannan's College	0-05
1998	St Finbarr's College	1-14	St Flannan's College	2-09
1999	St Flannan's College	2-14	St Colman's College	1-08
2000	St Colman's College	1-14	Our Lady's Secondary School	2-08
2001	St Colman's College	4-09	St Flannan's College	2-10
2002	Cashel Community School	4-10	St Flannan's College	0-11
2003	St Colman's College	1-09	De La Salle College	1-07
2004	St Flannan's College	2-18	St Colman's College	1-03
2005	De La Salle College	4-11	St Flannan's College	3-09
2006	St Flannan's College	1-09	Ardscoil Rís	0-10
2007	Our Lady's Secondary School	1-10	De La Salle College	2-04
2008	De La Salle College	1-06	Midleton CBS	1-06
2009	Ardscoil Rís	1-09	St Flannan's College	1-07
2010	Thurles CBS	0-09	Blackwater Community School	0-05
2011	St Flannan's College	2-11	De La Salle	1-06
2012	Blackwater Community School	0-11	Dungarvan CBS	0-08
2013	De La Salle	2-15	Gaelcholáiste Mhuire AG	0-10
2014	Midelton CBS	1-14	Ardscoil Rís	2-10
2015	Midelton CBS	1-10	Our Lady's Secondary School	0-12
2016	Ardscoil Rís	0-19	De La Salle	1-08
2017	St Colmans' College	2-12	Thurles CBS	1-13
2018	Thurles CBS	3-15	Midelton CBS	2-15
2019	Thurles CBS	1-09	De La Salle College	0-07
2020	St Colmans' College	0-14	Ardscoil Rís	1-10
2021	Cancelled due to the COVID-19 pandemic			
2022	St Flannan's College	3-16	Ardscoil Rís	0-16
2023	Ardscoil Rís	3-19	Thurles CBS	1-23
2024	Nenagh CBS	2-15	St Flannan's College	0-18
2025	Midelton CBS	5-15	Gaelcholáiste Mhuire AG	1-11
2026	Ardscoil Rís	1-11	Christian Brothers College	0-12

Notes

- 1939 - The first match ended in a draw: Thurles CBS 4-04, Lismore CBS 4-04.
- 2017- The first match ended in a draw after extra time: St Colman's College 1-19, Thurles CBS 3-13.

== See also ==
- Dr Harty Cup
- Frewen Cup
