= List of Dr Harty Cup winning teams =

This is a list of teams and players who have won the Dr Harty Cup since its inception in 1918.

== By year ==
List of Dr Harty Cup winning teams and players
Year	Team	Players	Ref
2016	Ardscoil Rís	S Mullane; S Hogan, S Phelan, R Connolly; J Boylan, N Fox (jc), C Houlihan; J Flynn, B Ryan; C Boylan, P Casey (jc), P O’Loughlin; D Carroll, D Fitzgerald, P O’Brien. Subs: C Moriarty, D Cunningham, J McInerney, J Delahunty.	
2017	Our Lady's Secondary School	E Collins; S Ryan, P Campion, E Ryan; N Quinlan, P Cadell (c), A O’Meara; D Ryan, S Nolan; D O’Shea, B McGrath, J Kelly, A Ormond, R McCormack, L Fairbrother. Subs: S Doyle, J Ryan, J Gilmartin, G O'Connor, D Byrne, M Egan-O’Brien.	
2018	Ardscoil Rís	J Gillane; P Heaney, J Considine, E McEvoy; J Boylan, R Connolly (c), C O’Reilly; D Ryan, R Duff; A Moriarty, P O’Brien, C Bourke; C O’Neill, D Woulfe, R Considine. Subs: B O’Connor; J Daly; S Long .	
2019	Midleton CBS	J McGann; D Moran, D Hogan (c), C O’Brien; R Landers, C Joyce, D Healy; S Quirke, R McCarthy; C Hickey, G Carroll, R O’Regan; J Hankard, J Stack, K Farmer. Subs: O Broderick; A Nganou; P Hassett.	
2020	St. Flannan's College	C Broderick; N Walsh, D Healy, M Reidy; T Butler, C Galvin (jc), S Casey; C Hegarty (jc), J Collins; A Brohan, C Cassidy, K O’Connor; P Power, D Cahill, O O’Donnell. Subs: J Doherty, D Cunningham, D Nagle, R Power.	
2021	Cancelled due to the COVID-19 pandemic		
2022	St Joseph's Secondary School	A Shanahan, D Ryan, A Hogan, F Ryan; M McMahon, T Leyden, O Clune; R O’Connor, D Keogh; O O’Connor, S Withycombe, F Hickey; C Cleary, C O’Donnell, E McMahon.Subs: A Curtis	
2023	Cashel Community School	T Breen; D Spillane, C Byrne, C Ryan; D Fogarty, J Quinlan, G O’Dwyer, O O'Donoghue, S Buckley; E Ormond, B Currivan, A Daly; D McGrath, F Ryan, R Connolly (JC). Subs: R Darcy, P Dalton	
2024	Nenagh CBS	S Grace; C Grace, C Connolly, G McGrath; J Doran, J Hackett, A Hoolan; C Foley, M Cawley; J Mulcahy, D McCarthy (C), Z Keller; A O’Connor, D Quinn, E Doughan. Subs: A Duff, D Treacy, J O’Dwyer	
2025	Thurles CBS	H Loughnane; T Corbett, E Morris, J Lahart; K Cantwell, K Loughnane, R Bargary; E Murray, K Rossiter; T Ryan, D Costigan, C Fitzpatrick; J Hayes, C Minogue, R Ryan. Subs: J Butler; D Hickey; K Cantwell	
2026	Nenagh CBS	P McCormack; D Fogarty, Shane Cleary, C Kennedy; E Jones, D O’Dwyer, J Grace; H Healy, A Duff; P Ryan, E Doughan (C), P Cahalan; E Tucker, P Hackett, J O’Dwyer. Subs: T Boland; R McGrath; KJ Dunne; C Kennedy; D McKelvey.	
