= 2024–25 Harty Cup =

Hurling tournament

2024–25 Dr Harty Cup
- Dates: 16 October 2024 – 1 February 2025
- Teams: 21
- Sponsor: TUS
- Champions: Thurles CBS (9th title); Robbie Ryan (captain); Niall Cahill (manager)
- Runners-up: St Flannan's College; James Hegarty (captain); Brendan Bugler (manager); Tony Kelly (manager)

Tournament statistics
- Matches played: 38
- Goals scored: 106 (2.79 per match)
- Points scored: 1316 (34.63 per match)
- Top scorer(s): Harry Doherty (3–57)

The 2024–25 Dr Harty Cup was the 104th staging of the Harty Cup since its establishment by the Munster Council of the Gaelic Athletic Association in 1918. The draw for the group stage took place on 26 August 2024. The competition ran from 16 October 2024 to 1 February 2025.

St Joseph's CBS, Nenagh were the defending champions, however, they were beaten by De La Salle College in the preliminary quarter-finals.

The final was played on 1 February 2025 at Mallow GAA Complex, between Thurles CBS and St Flannan's College, in what was their third meeting in the final overall and a first meeting in 20 years. Thurles CBS won the match by 1–13 to 0–13 to claim their ninth Harty Cup title overall and a first title in ten years.

Harry Doherty was the top scorer with 3–57.

== Team changes ==
=== To the competition ===
- Blackwater Community School
- St Francis College
- Tralee CBS

=== From the competition ===
- Carrick-on-Suir CBS
- Hamilton High School
- Pobalscoil na Tríonóide

== Group 1 ==
=== Group 1 table ===
Knockout stage

Team	Matches				Score			Pts
Team	Pld	W	D	L	For	Against	Diff	Pts
Christian Brothers College	3	3	0	0	66	44	22	6
John the Baptist CS	3	1	1	1	72	62	10	3
Rice College	3	1	0	2	53	72	-19	2
Scoil na Tríonóide	3	0	1	2	44	57	-13	1

=== Group 1 results ===
16 October 2024 Round 1	John the Baptist CS	4-20 - 0-20	Rice College	Meelick Grounds
	D Hurley 2-3, C Cronin 1-2, P Hennessy 1-1, H Flanagan 0-5 (4f), M Hanly 0-3, C McNamara, R Hanly, G McCaffrey J O’Shea, S McElligott and E Martin 0-1 each.	Report	P O’Donovan 0-13 (10f, ’65), J McAllister and D Moroney 0-2 each, C Henchy, N Doyle and R Mulcahy (f) 0-1 each.

16 October 2024 Round 1	Christian Brothers College	0-19 - 0-09	Scoil na Tríonóide	Glenroe Grounds
	E O’Shea (0-10, 0-7 frees), M T Brosnan and J Murray (0-2 each), J Huggins, M Quill, J Hegarty, R Higgins and B Mayer (0-1 each).	Report	D Crowe (0-3, 0-2 frees, 0-1 65), R McGrath (0-1 free) and D Coughlan (0-2 each), M Ryan Bob (free) and B Buckley (0-1 each).

6 November 2024 Round 2	Rice College	0-12 - 1-19	Christian Brothers College	Ballyagran Grounds
	P O’Donovan (0-11, 0-7 frees); D Moroney (0-1 each).	Report	E O’Shea (0-9, 0-5 frees); M Brosnan (1-5); C Murray (0-3); A Hourigan, M Quill (0-1 each).

6 November 2024 Round 2	John the Baptist CS	0-17 - 1-14	Scoil na Tríonóide	Kilteely Grounds
	H Flanagan (0-11, 0-10 frees), D Hurley and C Cronin 0-2 each, G McCaffrey and S Treacy 0-1 each	Report	D Crowe (0-5 frees), D Coughlan 0-3, C Kenny 1-0, B Buckley 0-3, S Hayes 0-2, S McDonnell 0-1

20 November 2024 Round 3	Rice College	1-18 - 1-15	Scoil na Tríonóide	UL Grounds
	P O’Donovan (0-12, 10 fs), D Moroney (1-0), N Doyle, C Henchy (0-2 each), E Fitzpatrick, D Cahill (0-1 each).	Report	D Crowe (0-9, 8 fs), M Ryan Bob (0-3), S Hanley (1-0), C Gantley, S Hayes, M Berkery (0-1 each).

20 November 2024 Round 3	John the Baptist CS	0-23 - 2-19	Christian Brothers College	Banteer Sportsfield
	E O'Shea (0-10, 4 frees); M Brosnan (1-1); C Murray (1-0); A Hourigan (0-2); D Riordan, R Buckley, B Mayer, M Quill, J Trench, S O'Driscoll (0-1 each).	Report	H Flanagan (0-7, 4 frees, 1 65); J O'Shea, D Hurley, C Cronin (0-3 each); D Heavey (2 frees), G McCaffrey (0-2 each); R Hanly, C McNamara, M Hanly (0-1 each).

== Group 2 ==
=== Group 2 table ===
Knockout stage

Team	Matches				Score			Pts
Team	Pld	W	D	L	For	Against	Diff	Pts
Ardscoil Rís	3	3	0	0	96	57	39	6
Our Lady's SS	3	2	0	1	66	52	14	4
Castletroy College	3	1	0	2	65	64	1	2
Coláiste Choilm	3	0	0	3	51	105	-54	0

=== Group 2 results ===
16 October 2024 Round 1	Ardscoil Rís	2-26 - 2-16	Castletroy College	Childers Road
	P Kearney (1-14, 0-9 frees), E Begley (1-2), M Collins (0-4), I O’Brien (0-3), S Arthur, J O’Connor, E Brosnan (0-1 each).	Report	R O’Farrell (1-7, 0-6 frees), C Clifford (1-2), M Fitzgerald (0-4), C Ryan, P Scully, D Moloughney (0-1 each).

16 October 2024 Round 1	Our Lady's Secondary School	3-25 - 1-12	Coláiste Choilm	Seán Treacy Park
	P O’Shea 0-10 (0-9 f), P O’Dwyer, C Dunne 1-2 each, J Marnell 0-4, S Stapleton 1-0, C Broderick, E Boyle 0-3 each, J Quinn 0-1.	Report	E Dwyer 0-8 (0-4 f, 0-1 65), C O’Connor 1-0, T Murphy 0-2, C Ahern, N Buckley 0-1 each.

5 November 2024 Round 2	Castletroy College	3-21 - 0-17	Coláiste Choilm	Ballyagran Grounds
	M Fitzgerald (0-14, 0-10 frees, 0-1 sl), R O’Farrell (2-1), C Scully (1-0), C Clifford and H McDermott (0-2 each), J Rennison and B Griffin (0-1 each).	Report	E Dwyer (0-11, 0-8 frees, 0-1 65), N Buckley (0-5), K O’Leary (0-1).

6 November 2024 Round 2	Ardscoil Rís	0-24 - 0-16	Our Lady's Secondary School	Páirc na nGael
	M Collins 0-7, S Arthur 0-4, P Kearney 0-3 (0-3 frees), O O’Byrne, I O’Brien, D Gleeson 0-2 each, E Begley (0-2, 0-1free), J O’Keefe, E Brosnan 0-1 each.	Report	P O’Shea 0-8 (0-8 frees), P O’Dwyer, E Boyle 0-2 each, J Marnell, J Quinn 0-1 each, C Bourke 0-1 (0-1 free), N Delaney 0-1 (0-1 free)

20 November 2024 Round 3	Ardscoil Rís	9-23 - 2-13	Coláiste Choilm	Mallow GAA Complex
	E Begley 3-5 (0-3 frees, 0-1 65'), S Arthur 3-1, P Kearney 1-8 (0-4 frees), M Collins 2-3, D Gleeson 0-2 (0-1 free), C Murphy, O O'Byrne, R Benson 0-1 each.	Report	N Buckley 1-3, E O'Dwyer 1-5 (0-3 frees, 0-1 65'), C Power, A Heelan, T Murphy, C O'Connor 0-1 each

20 November 2024 Round 3	Castletroy College	1-10 - 0-16	Our Lady's Secondary School	St Michael's Park
	M Fitzgerald 0-7 (frees), B Griffin 1-1, R O'Farrell 0-2 (0-1 free).	Report	P O'Shea 0-10 (0-8 frees, 0-1 '65), J Marnell 0-3, M Conroy, J Quinn, P O'Dwyer 0-1 each

== Group 3 ==
=== Group 3 table ===
Knockout stage

Team	Matches				Score			Pts
Team	Pld	W	D	L	For	Against	Diff	Pts
Cashel Community School	3	2	1	0	60	46	14	5
Blackwater CS	3	2	0	1	63	53	10	4
CBS Charleville	3	1	0	2	60	80	-20	2
St Joseph's SS	3	0	1	2	63	67	-4	1

=== Group 3 results ===
16 October 2024 Round 1	Cashel Community School	3-15 - 0-18	CBS Charleville	Ballyporeen Grounds
	C Bourke (0-7, 5fs), B O’Donoghue and S Kennedy (1-2), R O’Sullivan (1-0), C Hall (0-2), S Hall and T O’Driscoll (0-1 each).	Report	C Dunne (0-15, 10fs), B J Reidy, S Bresnan and T O’Neill (0-1 each).

16 October 2024 Round 1	Blackwater Community School	2-16 - 0-20	St Joseph's Secondary School	FitzGerald Park
	B Cummins 0-9 (8f); S Murphy 1-3; J Twomey 1-0; J Hickey 0-2; J McDonnell, C Lineen 0-1 each.	Report	M Corbett 0-13 (11f, 1 ‘65); J O’Connor 0-3 (2f); C Culloo, L Murphy, A O’Driscoll, D White 0-1 each.

4 November 2024 Round 2	CBS Charleville	0-14 - 5-15	Blackwater Community School	Kildorrery Grounds
	S Byrne (0-9, 0-8 frees), T O’Neill (0-2), B Jordan Reidy, P Daly and D Mackessy (0-1 each).	Report	Murphy (2-4, 0-2 frees), B Cummins (0-8, 0-6 frees, 0-1 65), J Hickey (1-1), A Cummins and S Óg Costin (1-0 each), C Lineen (0-2), J McDonnell (0-1).

6 November 2024 Round 2	Cashel Community School	0-17 - 0-17	St Joseph's Secondary School	Cappamore Grounds
	C Bourke (0-8, 4 frees), C Hall, S Hall, C Ryan (0-2 each), R O’Sullivan, E Ryan, C Lonergan (0-1 each).	Report	M Corbett (0-7, 6 frees), J O’Connor (0-4, 1 free), C Leamy (0-3), R Hayes (0-2, 1 free), M Vaughan (0-1).

20 November 2024 Round 3	CBS Charleville	4-16 - 1-23	St Joseph's Secondary School	UL Grounds
	C Dunne (0-11, 7f, 1’65); S Bresnan (3-2); D Mackessy (1-2); T O’Neill (0-1).	Report	J O’Connor (0-8, 6f); L Murphy (1-3); M Corbett (3f), D White (0-4 each); M Vaughan (0-2); A O’Driscoll, J Moran (0-1 each).

26 November 2024 Round 3	Cashel Community School	0-19 - 1-08	Blackwater Community School	Fethard Town Park
	B O’Donoghue (0-11, 9 frees, 1 sideline); C Hall (0-3, 1 sideline); S Cooney, S Hall, W Colville, S Kennedy, R O’Sullivan (0-1 each).	Report	B Cummins (0-6, 2 frees, 2 65s); A Cummins (1-0); D O’Farrell, S Murphy (0-1 each).

== Group 4 ==
=== Group 4 table ===
Knockout stage

Team	Matches				Score			Pts
Team	Pld	W	D	L	For	Against	Diff	Pts
Midleton CBS	2	1	1	0	57	32	25	3
Nenagh CBS	2	1	1	0	55	34	21	3
St Francis College	2	0	0	2	28	74	-46	0

=== Group 4 results ===
16 October 2024 Round 1	Nenagh CBS	0-19 - 0-19	Midleton CBS	Ballyagran GAA Grounds
	E Doughan (0-10, 0-9 frees); B O’Brien (0-3); S Cleary (0-2); E Sherlock (0-1 free), C Grace, C Hogan, J O’Dwyer (0-1 each).	Report	Barry Walsh (0-9, 0-7 frees); J O’Brien (0-3); P Barrett, J O’Leary, A Lee (0-2 each); C Morley (0-1).

6 November 2024 Round 2	Nenagh CBS	7-15 - 1-12	St Francis College	Littleton Grounds
	E Doughan 2-7 (0-4 f, 1-0 f, 1-0 pen, 0-1 65), J O’Dwyer 2-2, A Duff 1-1, E Garrigan, E Grace 1-0 each, B O’Meara 0-2, B O’Donnell, D Treacy, E Jones 0-1 each.	Report	M O’Brien 0-9 (0-5 f), B Lynch 1-1, O O’Donovan, C Hanratty 0-1 each.

20 November 2024 Round 3	Midleton CBS	6-20 - 0-13	St Francis College	Páirc Uí Chaoimh 4G
	T O’Donoghue Brosnan 0-6 (0-4 f, 0-1 65), A Lee, C Stack 1-3 each, C Garde 1-2, J O’Brien 1-1, C Deane 1-0, C Morley, P Barrett 0-2 each, J O’Leary 0-1.	Report	M O’Brien 0-4 (0-1 f), C Hanratty 0-3, R Dooley, C Lowney 0-2 each, A Geary, T Lucas 0-1 each.

== Group 5 ==
=== Group 5 table ===
Knockout stage

Team	Matches				Score			Pts
Team	Pld	W	D	L	For	Against	Diff	Pts
De La Salle College	2	2	0	0	73	35	38	4
Gaelcholáiste Mhuire AG	2	1	0	1	42	55	-13	2
St Colman's College	2	0	0	2	35	60	-25	0

=== Group 5 results ===
16 October 2024 Round 1	De La Salle College	3-26 - 1-17	Gaelcholáiste Mhuire AG	Ballinameela Grounds
	M Hartley 1-14 (0-9f), S Power 2-1, C Hartley 0-4 (0-2f), A Regan 0-3, C Tobin 0-2, J Shanahan, O Fives 0-1 each.	Report	C Ó Súilleabháin 1-12 (1-7f, 0-2 65), J Ó hÉigeartaigh 0-2, L Ó Muirthile, J Ó Brosnacháin, C Ó Gealbháin 0-1 each.

6 November 2024 Round 2	De La Salle College	4-23 - 0-15	St Colman's College	Fraher Field
	M Hartley (0-10, 0-7 frees), A Regan (2-1), C Tobin and O Fives (1-2 each), R Jacob (0-3), C O’Sullivan, P Power, E Burke, C Hartley (free) and R Doherty (0-1 each).	Report	F Lardner (0-11, 0-8 frees), L Óg Hegarty (0-2), B McGrath and J Counihan (0-1 each).

20 November 2024 Round 3	Gaelcholáiste Mhuire AG	0-22 - 0-20	St Colman's College	Felix Sarsfield Memorial Park
	C Ó Suilleabháin 0-10 (0-9 f), L Ó Muirthile, C Ó Cofaigh 0-3 each, C Ó Maonaigh, J Ó Brosnacháin, J Ó hÉigeartaigh, D Ó Connaill, S Ó Dálaigh, T Ó Bruadau 0-1 each.	Report	F Lardner 0-9 f, B McGrath 0-3, J Counihan, L Óg Hegarty, O Magner 0-2 each, J Temple, T McCarthy 0-1 each.

== Group 6 ==
=== Group 6 table ===
Knockout stage

Team	Matches				Score			Pts
Team	Pld	W	D	L	For	Against	Diff	Pts
St Flannan's College	2	1	1	0	65	34	31	3
Thurles CBS	2	1	1	0	58	45	13	3
Tralee CBS	2	0	0	1	25	69	-44	0

=== Group 6 results ===
16 October 2024 Round 1	St Flannan's College	2-21 - 2-21	Thurles CBS	Cappamore Grounds
	H Doherty (0-8, 7 frees); C Ralph (2-0); R Kilroy (0-4); D Kennedy, D Costelloe (0-2 each); C Daly, J Cullinan, J Hegarty, N Hegarty, P O'Connell (0-1 each).	Report	C Fitzpatrick (1-7, 1-5 frees); J Hayes (1-0); K Rossiter (0-3); D Costigan, R Ryan, C Minogue, R Bargary (0-2 each); D McCahey, E Morris, E Murray (0-1 each).

6 November 2024 Round 2	Thurles CBS	2-25 - 2-12	Tralee CBS	The Bog Garden
	C Fitzpatrick (0-10, 6fs, 1’65), C Minogue (2-2), J Hayes (0-5), E Murray (0-4), R Ryan (0-2), D Costigan and T Ryan (0-1each)	Report	L Óg O’Connor (2-9, 6fs, 2 ’65’s), A Kerins, L Rochford and M Corridan (0-1 each)

20 November 2024 Round 3	St Flannan's College	3-29 - 0-07	Tralee CBS	Ballyagran Grounds
	H Doherty 1-10 (0-6fs, 0-2 ‘65s), C Ralph 2-1, P O’Connell, D Kennedy, R Kilroy 0-3 each, D Costelloe, J Hegarty(fs), D McNamara 0-2 each, R Loftus, N Hegarty, M Cleary 0-1 each.	Report	L Óg O’Connor 0-8 (0-7fs), M Corridon 0-1.

== Knockout stage ==
=== Preliminary quarter-finals ===
The draw for the preliminary quarter-finals was made on 26 November 2024.

4 December 2024 Pre quarter-final	St Flannan's College	0-14 - 1-07	John the Baptist CS	TUS Midwest Campus
	H Doherty (0-8, 5f); C Ralph (0-2); R Loftus, R Kilroy, D Costelloe, J Cullinan (0-1 each)	Report	C Cronin 0-3 (0-2f) R Hanly (1-0); H Flanagan (0-2f); D Heavey, D Hurley (0-1 each).

4 December 2024 Pre quarter-final	De La Salle College	0-15 - 0-12	Nenagh CBS	Canon Hayes Park
	M Hartley (0-10, 8 frees); C Tobin (0-2); C Hartley (free), A Regan, O Fives (0-1 each).	Report	E Doughan (0-8, 7 frees); G McGrath, J O’Dwyer, A Duff, E Jones (0-1 each).

4 December 2024 Pre quarter-final	Thurles CBS	1-21 - 1-06	Our Lady's Secondary School	The Ragg
	C Fitzpatrick (0-7, 3f), R Ryan (1-3), T Ryan (0-3), R Bargary, C Minogue, J Butler (0-2 each), K Cantwell, K Rossiter (0-1 each).	Report	P O’Shea (0-3, 3f), P O’Dwyer (1-0), E Boyle (0-2), C Dunne (0-1).

4 December 2024 Pre quarter-final	Blackwater Community School	3-10 - 0-22 (aet)	Gaelcholáiste Mhuire AG	Castlelyons Grounds
	B Cummins (2-8, 1-8 frees, 1-0 pen); D O’Farrell (1-1); A Cummins (0-1).	Report	C Ó Súilleabháin (0-16, 0-11 frees, 0-3 ‘65s); S Ó Dálaigh, D Ó Conaill (0-2 each); L Ó Muirthile, J Ó hÉigeartaigh (0-1 each).

=== Quarter-finals ===
The draw for the quarter-finals was made on 9 December 2024.

13 January 2025 Quarter-final	Christian Brothers College	2-15 - 2-24	De La Salle College	Fethard Town Park
	C McCarthy (1-1); B Mayer, E O’Shea (0-4 each); C O’Flynn (1-0); A Hourigan (0-3); M Quill, M Brosnan, S O’Driscoll (0-1 each).	Report	A Regan (1-4); M Hartley (0-6, 2 frees, 1 65); S Power (0-4); C Power (1-0); R Doherty (0-3); C Tobin (0-2); P Power, J Power, R Jacob, O Fives, E Burke (0-1 each).

13 January 2025 Quarter-final	Midleton CBS	1-18 - 2-16	St Flannan's College	Fathard Town Park
	Barry Walsh 1-9 (0-6 f, 0-1 65), P Barrett 0-4, A Lee 0-3, J O’Brien, Ben Walsh 0-1 each.	Report	H Doherty 1-12 (1-10 f), D Kennedy 1-1, M Cleary 0-2, R Loftus 0-1.

13 January 2025 Quarter-final	Ardscoil Rís	0-23 - 2-25	Thurles CBS	UL North Campus
	E Brosnan and M Collins 0-5 each, P Kearney 0-4 (3f, ’65), I O’Brien 0-3, J Cosgrave 0-2, E Begley, D Gleeson, J O’Keeffe and C Murphy 0-1 each.	Report	C Fitzpatrick 1-10 (7f), J Hayes 1-2, D Costigan and C Minogue 0-4 each, R Ryan 0-3, K Loughnane and K Cantwell 0-1 each

13 January 2025 Quarter-final	Cashel Community School	0-10 - 0-18	Gaelcholáiste Mhuire AG	UL North Campus
	B O’Donoghue 0-4 (0-3 f, 0-1 65), C Hall 0-2, S Cooney, S Hall, C Bourke, C Fogarty 0-1 each.	Report	C Ó Súilleabháin 0-13 (0-8 f, 0-1 65), E Ó Cróinín 0-2, C Ó Cofaigh, C Ó Gealbháin, D Ó Conaill 0-1 each.

=== Semi-finals ===
22 January 2025 Semi-final	Gaelcholáiste Mhuire AG	2-07 - 3-20	St Flannan's College	Ballyagran Grounds
	C Ó Súilleabháin (1-5, 1-0 penalty, 0-3 frees, 0-1 65); C Ó Cofaigh (1-0); C Ó Briain, J Ó hÉigeartaigh (0-1 each).	Report	H Doherty (1-9, 0-7 frees); D Ball, C Ralph (1-0 each); R Kilroy (0-3); M Cleary (0-2); G Ball, D Costelloe, D Kennedy, R Loftus, D McNamara, P Finneran (0-1 each).

22 January 2025 Semi-final	Thurles CBS	0-28 - 3-12	De La Salle College	Castlelyons Grounds
	C Minogue (0-7), D Costigan, C Fitzpatrick (0-3 frees, 0-1 65) and R Ryan (0-4 each), E Morris, R Bargary and K Rossiter (0-2 each), T Corbett, E Murray and T Ryan (0-1 each).	Report	M Hartley (1-5, 0-3 frees), S Power (1-2), C Tobin (1-0), A Regan (0-2), C Hartley (pen), R Jacob and O Fives (0-1 each).

=== Final ===
1 February 2025 Final	St Flannan's College	0-13 - 1-13	Thurles CBS	Mallow GAA Complex
	H Doherty 0-10 (9fs), J Hegarty (65), R Loftus, D Costelloe 0-1 each.	Report	C Fitzpatrick 0-7 (6fs, 1 65), J Hayes 1-0, C Minogue 0-2, K Cantwell, E Murray, D Costigan, R Ryan 0-1 each.	Referee: J Murphy (Limerick)

== Statistics ==
=== Top scorers ===
Overall

Rank	Player	Club	Tally	Total	Matches	Average
1	Harry Doherty	St Flannan's College	3-57	66	6	11.00
2	Craig Ó Súilleabháin	Gaelcholáiste Mhuire AG	2-56	62	5	12.40
3	Mark Hartley	De La Salle College	2-45	51	5	10.20
3	Cormac Fitzpatrick	Thurles CBS	2-45	51	7	7.28
5	Ben Cummins	Blackwater Community School	2-31	37	4	9.25
6	Padraig O' Donovan	Rice College	0-36	36	3	12.00
7	Patrick Kearney	Ardscoil Rís	2-29	35	4	8.75
8	Eoghan O'Shea	CBC Cork	0-33	33	4	8.25
9	Eoghan Doughan	Nenagh CBS	2-25	31	3	10.33
9	Pádraic O'Shea	Our Lady's SS	0-31	31	4	7.75

Single game

Rank	Player	Club	Tally	Total	Opposition
1	Mark Hartley	De La Salle College	1-14	17	Gaelcholáiste Mhuire AG
1	Patrick Kearney	Ardscoil Rís	1-14	17	Castletroy College
3	Craig Ó Súilleabháin	Gaelcholáiste Mhuire AG	0-16	16	Blackwater Community School
4	Liam Óg O'Connor	Tralee CBS	2-09	15	Thurles CBS
4	Harry Doherty	St Flannan's College	1-12	15	Midleton CBS
4	Craig Ó Súilleabháin	Gaelcholáiste Mhuire AG	1-12	15	De La Salle College
4	Chris Dunne	CBS Charleville	0-15	15	Cashel Community School
8	Eoin Begley	Ardscoil Rís	3-05	14	Coláiste Choilm
8	Ben Cummins	Blackwater Community School	2-08	14	Gaelcholáiste Mhuire AG
8	Matthew Fitzgerald	Castletroy College	0-14	14	Coláiste Choilm
