= 1936–37 Harty Cup =

Hurling tournament

1936–37 Dr Harty Cup
- Dates: 18 February – 17 April 1937
- Teams: 7
- Champions: North Monastery (6th title)
- Runners-up: Mount Sion CBS

Tournament statistics
- Matches played: 6
- Goals scored: 53 (8.83 per match)
- Points scored: 33 (5.5 per match)

The 1936–37 Harty Cup was the 18th staging of the Harty Cup since the establishment of the hurling competition by the Munster Council of the Gaelic Athletic Association in 1918. The draw for the opening round fixtures took place on 19 October 1936. The competition contested from 18 February to 17 April 1937 at the Castle Grounds in Lismore.

North Monastery successfully defended its title, 6–02 to 2–04, in the Harty Cup final on 17 April 1937 against Mount Sion CBS, in what was their first ever meeting in the final; and North Monastery sixth successive Harty Cup title overall and its record first set of four consecutive titles.

== Results ==
=== First round ===
18 February 1937 First round	Thurles CBS	3-04 - 7-02	North Monastery	Deerpark Enclosure

21 February 1937 First round	Limerick CBS	1-00 - 3-04	Rockwell College	Gaelic Grounds

4 March 1937 First round	Doon CBS	7-01 - 8-07	Mount Sion CBS	Clonmel GAA Ground

- Ennis CBS received a by in this round.

=== Semi-finals ===
10 March 1937 Semi-final	North Monastery	9-03 - 1-02	Rockwell College	Mitchelstown Grounds

20 March 1937 Semi-final	Ennis CBS	1-00 - 3-04	Mount Sion CBS	Mitchelstown Grounds

=== Final ===
17 April 1937 Final	North Monastery	6-02 - 4-04	Mount Sion CBS	Castle Grounds

== Statistics ==
=== Miscellaneous ===
- Peader O'Callaghan became the first player to win four Dr Harty Cup medals. He remains the only player from the North Monastery to have achieved this feat.
