= Dr Harty Cup =

Hurling competition

- Current season or competition: 2026–27 Harty Cup
- Irish: Corn an Artaigh
- Code: Hurling
- Founded: 1918; 108 years ago
- Region: Munster (GAA)
- Trophy: Dr. Harty Cup
- No. of teams: 21
- Title holders: St. Joseph's CBS Nenagh (2nd title)
- First winner: Rockwell College
- Most titles: St Flannan's College (22 titles)
- Sponsors: TUS
- Official website: Official website

The Dr. Harty Cup is an annual inter-schools hurling competition organised by the Munster PPS GAA division of the Gaelic Athletic Association (GAA). It has been contested every year, except on three occasions, since 1918. As the pinnacle of inter-schools hurling competition in the province of Munster, the winning of a Harty Cup medal is viewed by some players as more important than an All-Ireland medal.

The final, usually held in February, serves as the culmination of a round-robin group stage and knockout series of games played between October and February. Eligible players must be under the age of 19.

The Dr. Harty Cup is an integral part of the wider All-Ireland PPS Championship. The winners and runners-up of the Dr Harty Cup final, like their counterparts in the Connacht and Leinster Championships, advance to the All-Ireland quarter-finals or semi-finals.

21 teams currently participate in the Dr Harty Cup. The title has been won at least once by 20 different schools, 12 of which have won the title more than once. St Flannan's College are the all-time title record-holders at 22 times. St Joseph's CBS Nenagh are the current champions, having beaten St Flannan's College in the 2026 final.

== History ==
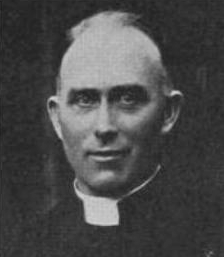
Archbishop John Harty donated the cup which would bear his name.

Since 1900 a number of unsuccessful attempts were made to organise Gaelic games in secondary schools in Munster. A motion put forward by E. D. Ryan at the Tipperary County Board convention in December 1916 called on secondary schools in the county to give Gaelic games a foremost place. He also suggested that a deputation visit the principals of various colleges to get an explanation from them as to why they "wholly supported the games of snobocracy". A Munster schools' and colleges' meeting on 2 June 1917 agreed to the establishment of a provincial hurling competition. The upper age limit for the competition was set at 19. J. M. Harty, Archbishop of Cashel and Emly, donated a cup for the competition. At a further meeting in September 1917 it was agreed to reduce the age limit to 18.

The draw for the inaugural Harty Cup was made in January 1918, with Rockwell College becoming the first champions after a 5–05 to 3–01 defeat of Christian Brothers College in the final. Rockwell College went on to claim five titles up to 1931 before later concentrating on rugby union, while fellow rugby school St Munchin's College also won a Harty Cup title in 1922. Limerick CBS dominated the competition during the 1920s and became the first team to win three titles in-a-row.

After winning Harty Cup titles in 1919 and 1929, the North Monastery from Cork went on to dominate the following period. They became the first team to win four consecutive Harty Cup titles (1934 - 1937). These teams featured such players as the Buckley brothers, Connie and Din Joe, Dave Creedon, future Taoiseach Jack Lynch, Dan Moylan and Paddy O'Donovan. North Monastery secured a second set of four consecutive titles (1940 - 1943). Mick Kennefick, John Lyons and future GAA President Con Murphy formed the backbones of those teams. The North Mon's run of successes was ended by a Jimmy Smyth-captained St Flannan's College from Ennis, who won their own four consecutive titles (1944 to 1947).

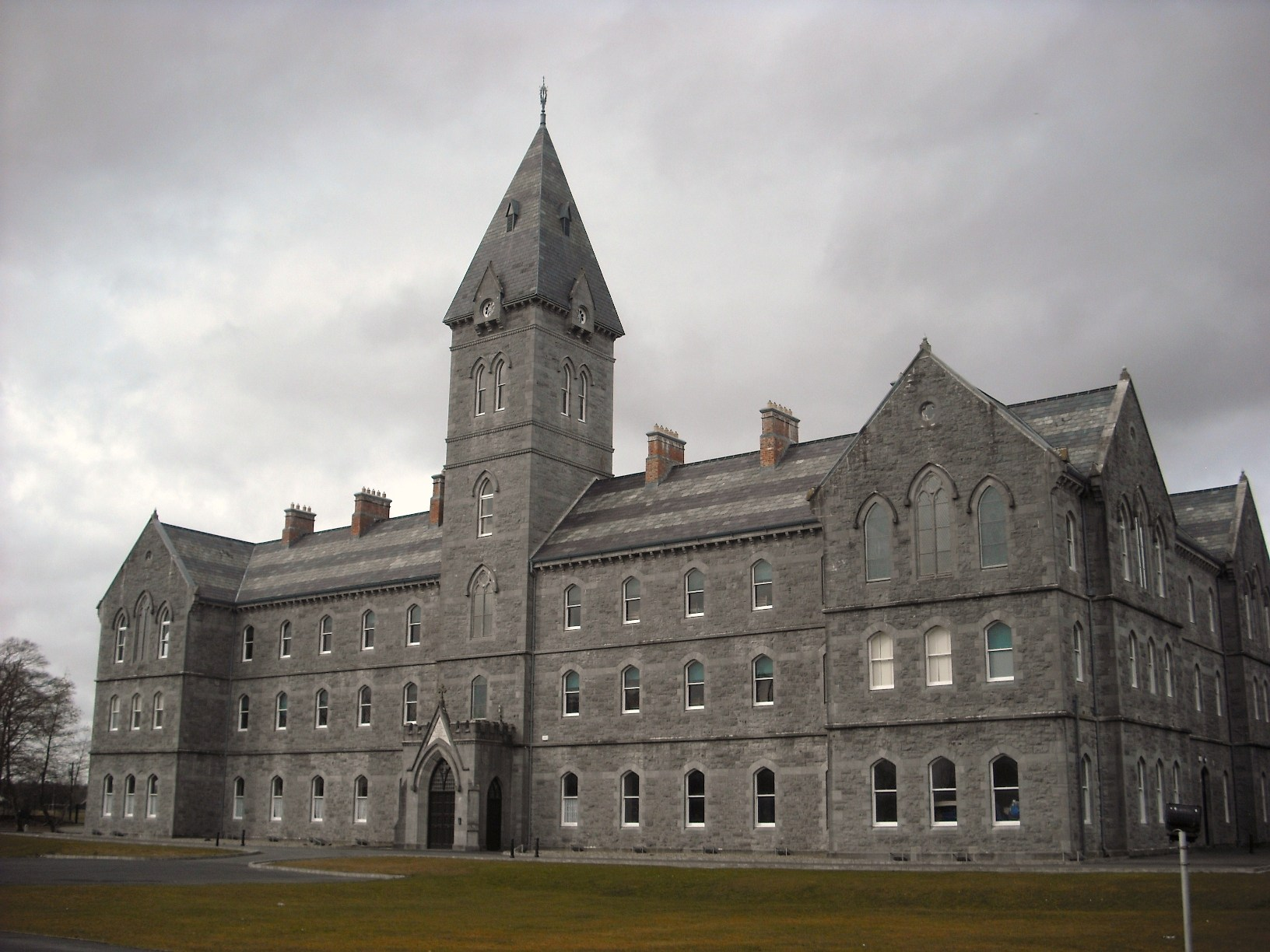
St Flannan's College are the all-time record holders.

St Flannan's won another four Harty Cup titles in the 1950s, however, Thurles CBS came in second with three titles. St Colman's College, Abbey CBS and Mount Sion CBS, featuring Martin Óg Morrissey and Frankie Walsh, all won first-time titles during the same period. The 1960s began with the North Monastery winning consecutive titles, before Rice College claimed their only title after a defeat of St Flannan's College in an all-Ennis final in 1962. They were beaten by first-time champions St Finbarr's College a year later, however, Limerick CBS with Éamonn Cregan and Éamonn Grimes became the third team to win four consecutive Harty Cup titles. Limerick's attempt at winning a record fifth successive Harty Cup ended with the success of the first-time champions Coláiste Chríost Rí in 1968. This win ushered in eight successive victories for Cork schools, with a Christy Ring-trained St Finbarr's College leading the way by winning five Harty Cup titles in six seasons between 1969 and 1974. The competition was played with 13 players-a-side during this period, however, this experiment was later abandoned.

The North Monastery began the 1980s with back-to-back Harty Cup titles, with a team that featured Teddy McCarthy, Tomás Mulcahy and Tony O'Sullivan. They won four titles in all during the decade, while St Flannan's College also won four titles. Midelton CBS became first-time champions in 1988. St Flannan's College continued to dominate the competition by winning four Harty Cup titles during the 1990s. Limerick CBS, North Monastery and a Donal Óg Cusack-captained Midleton CBS also claimed Harty Cup victories.

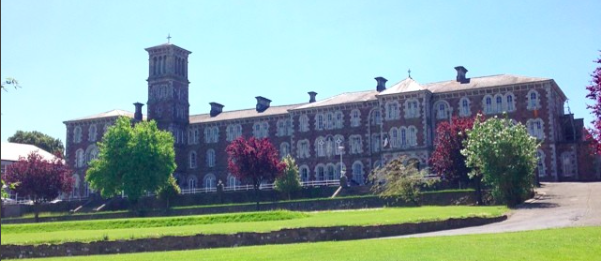
St Colman's College.

The turn of the century saw St Flannan's College and St Colman's College dominate the Harty Cup. They each won five titles between 1996 and 2005. Their hegemony was brought to an end by Midleton CBS in 2006, a victory which began a period of decline for the Cork-based schools and some of the other traditional powers. De La Salle College became the first Waterford-based team to win the Harty Cup in over 50 years when they claimed back-to-back titles in 2007 and 2008. Thurles CBS followed this up by bridging a 53-year gap when they claimed the Harty Cup in 2009. The following decade belonged to Limerick-based Ardscoil Rís, who won five Harty Cup titles between 2010 and 2018, with teams that featured Shane Dowling, Declan Hannon and Cian Lynch. By that stage, vocational schools were permitted to field teams in the competition after the merging of the vocational schools' and colleges' championships in 2013. St Joseph's Secondary School (2022) and Cashel Community School (2023) became the most recent first-time champions.

== Current format ==
=== Participating teams ===
The following teams participated in the 2023-24 championship:

Team	Location	Colours
Ardscoil Rís	Limerick	Black, red and yellow
Castletroy College	Limerick	Blue and navy
Cashel Community School	Cashel	Yellow and blue
CBS Secondary School, Carrick-on-Suir	Carrick-on-Suir	Black and red
Charleville CBS	Charleville	Red and green
Christian Brothers College	Cork	Black, red and yellow
Coláiste Choilm	Ballincollig	Blue and white
De La Salle College	Waterford	Maroon and yellow
Gaelcholáiste Mhuire AG	Cork	Blue and white
Hamilton High School	Bandon	Yellow and white
John the Baptist Community School	Hospital	Red and black
Midleton CBS	Midleton	Red and white
Nenagh CBS	Nenagh	Black and blue
Our Lady's Secondary School	Templemore	Maroon and white
Pobalscoil na Tríonóide	Youghal	Blue and red
Rice College	Ennis	Yellow and blue
Scoil na Tríonóide Naofa	Doon	Blue and navy
St Colman's College	Fermoy	Green and white
St Flannan's College	Ennis	Blue and white
St Mary's CBS	Tralee	Blue and yellow
St Joseph's Secondary School	Tulla	Blue and white
Thurles CBS	Thurles	Blue and yellow

=== Championship ===
The championship begins with a group stage of 21 teams, divided into six groups. Three groups contain four teams and three groups contain three teams. Each team meets the others in the group once in a round-robin format. The first-placed and second-placed teams from each group progress to the knockout stage. For this stage, the winning team from one group plays against the runners-up from another group.

=== Qualification for the All-Ireland Championship ===
As of 2005, the winners and runners up of the Dr Harty Cup qualify for the All-Ireland Colleges Championship. The runners-up qualify for the quarter-finals, while on some occasions the champions receive a bye to the semi-final stage, however, this is done in rotation with the Connacht and Leinster champions.

== Trophy and medals ==
The winning team is presented with the Dr Harty Cup, which is shaped like a traditional mether drinking vessel, similar in design to the Liam MacCarthy Cup. It was commissioned to honour John Harty (1867–1946), who was the Archbishop of Cashel and Emly for over 30 years until his death in 1946.

Traditionally, the victory presentation takes place at a special rostrum in the main grandstand of the stadium. The winning captain accepts the cup on behalf of his team before giving a short speech. Individual members of the winning team then have an opportunity to come to the rostrum to lift the cup, which is held by the winning team until the following year's final. In accordance with GAA rules, a set of gold medals is awarded to the championship winners.

== Roll of honours ==
=== Performance by college ===
Rank	Team	Won	Runner-up	Years won	Years runner-up
1	St Flannan's College	22	20	1944, 1945, 1946, 1947, 1952, 1954, 1957, 1958, 1976, 1979, 1982, 1983, 1987, 1989, 1990, 1991, 1998, 1999, 2000, 2004, 2005, 2020	1927, 1948, 1949, 1953, 1959, 1962, 1964, 1971, 1972, 1977, 1978, 1985, 1992, 1993, 2001, 2003, 2006, 2007, 2025, 2026
2	North Monastery	20	10	1919, 1928, 1929, 1934, 1935, 1936, 1937, 1940, 1941, 1942, 1943, 1955, 1960, 1961, 1970, 1980, 1981, 1985, 1986, 1994	1933, 1939, 1945, 1946, 1956, 1957, 1979, 1982, 1983, 1991
3	Limerick CBS	10	12	1920, 1925, 1926, 1927, 1932, 1964, 1965, 1966, 1967, 1993	1923, 1924, 1940, 1941, 1955, 1958, 1968, 1970, 1974, 1975, 1984, 1998
4	Thurles CBS	9	11	1933, 1938, 1939, 1950, 1951, 1956, 2009, 2015, 2025	1932, 1943, 1954, 1960, 1961, 1966, 1988, 2005, 2008, 2010, 2023
4	St Colman's College	9	4	1948, 1949, 1977, 1992, 1996, 1997, 2001, 2002, 2003,	1920, 1947, 1980, 2017
6	St Finbarr's College	7	3	1963, 1969, 1971, 1972, 1973, 1974, 1984	1952, 1967, 1999
7	Rockwell College	5	7	1918, 1923, 1924, 1930, 1931	1922, 1925, 1926, 1928, 1929, 1934, 1935
7	Ardscoil Rís	5	2	2010, 2011, 2014, 2016, 2018	2022, 2024
9	Midleton CBS	4	6	1988, 1995, 2006, 2019	1944, 1950, 1986, 1987, 1994, 2018
10	Our Lady's Secondary School	2	4	1978, 2017	2000, 2002, 2013, 2016
10	Nenagh CBS	2	4	2024, 2026	1990, 1996, 1997, 2012
10	De La Salle College	2	2	2007, 2008	1965, 1976
10	Coláiste na nDéise	2	1	2012, 2013	2004
13	Mount Sion CBS	1	2	1953	1930, 1937
13	Coláiste Chríost Rí	1	2	1968	1969, 1981
13	Rice College	1	1	1962	1963
13	Cashel Community School	1	1	2023	1973
13	St Munchin's College	1	0	1922	
13	Abbey CBS	1	0	1959	
13	Coláiste Iognáid Rís	1	0	1975	
13	St Joseph's Secondary School	1	0	2022	
22	Christian Brothers College	0	3		1918. 2019, 2020
22	CBS Charleville	0	2	-	1938, 2011
22	M.S.J. Roscrea	0	1	-	1919
22	Doon CBS	0	1	-	1931
22	Coláiste na Mumhan	0	1	-	1936
22	Sullivan's Quay	0	1	-	1951
22	Shannon Comprehensive School	0	1	-	1989
22	Lismore CBS	0	1	-	1995
22	St Caimin's Community School	0	1	-	2009
22	Scoil na Tríonóide Naofa	0	1	-	2014
22	St Francis's College	0	1	-	2015

=== Performance by county ===
County		Winners	Runners-Up	Winning Colleges	Runner-Up Colleges
Border	Cork	41	33	North Monastery (20), St Colman's College (9), St Finbarr's College (7), Midleton CBS (4), Coláiste Chriost Rí (1), Coláiste Iognáid Rís (1)	North Monastery (10), Midleton CBS (6), St Colman's College (4), St Finbarr's College (3), Coláiste Chriost Rí (2), CBS Charleville (2), Christian Brothers College (3), Coláiste na Mumhan (1), Sullivan's Quay (1), St Francis College Rochestown (1)
Border	Clare	24	23	St Flannan's College (22), Rice College (1), St Joseph's Secondary School, Tulla (1)	St Flannan's College (20), Rice College (1), Shannon Comprehensive (1), St Caimin's Community School (1)
Border	Tipperary	20	26	Thurles CBS (9), Rockwell College (5), Nenagh CBS (2), Our Lady's Secondary School (2), Abbey CBS (1), Cashel CS (1)	Thurles CBS (11), Rockwell College (7), Our Lady's Secondary School (4), Nenagh CBS (4), M.S.J. Roscrea (1), Cashel CS (1)
Border	Limerick	16	16	Limerick CBS (10), Ardscoil Rís (5), St Munchin's College (1)	Limerick CBS (12), Ardscoil Rís (2), Scoil na Tríonóide Naofa (1), Doon CBS (1)
Border	Waterford	5	6	De La Salle College (2), Coláiste na nDéise (2), Mount Sion CBS (1)	De La Salle College (2), Mount Sion CBS (2), Coláiste na nDéise (1), Lismore CBS (1)

== List of finals ==
Year	Winners	Score	Runners-up	Score
1918	Rockwell College	5-05	Christian Brothers College	3-01
1919	North Monastery	3-02	Mount St. Joseph Abbey	2-02
1920	Limerick CBS	7-00	St Colman's College	3-00
1921	No Competition			
1922	St Munchin's College	4-01	Rockwell College	3-03
1923	Rockwell College	5-02	Limerick CBS	2-01
1924	Rockwell College	8-00	Limerick CBS	4-02
1925	Limerick CBS	4-00	Rockwell College	1-01
1926	Limerick CBS	3-03	Rockwell College	1-03
1927	Limerick CBS	11-07	St Flannan's College	1-00
1928	North Monastery	10-04	Rockwell College	1-00
1929	North Monastery	6-03	Rockwell College	5-00
1930	Rockwell College	8-02	Mount Sion CBS	1-01
1931	Rockwell College	6-02	Doon CBS	1-01
1932	Limerick CBS	4-01	Thurles CBS	2-02
1933	Thurles CBS	3-03	North Monastery	1-03
1934	North Monastery	4-02, 7-01 (R)	Rockwell College	4-02, 3-03 (R)
1935	North Monastery	4-08	Rockwell College	3-02
1936	North Monastery	4-03	Coláiste na Mumhan, Mallow	2-06
1937	North Monastery	6-02	Mount Sion CBS	2-04
1938	Thurles CBS	7-07	Charleville CBS	3-02
1939	Thurles CBS	7-04	North Monastery	4-04
1940	North Monastery	6-03	Limerick CBS	4-02
1941	North Monastery	4-02	Limerick CBS	1-03
1942	North Monastery		none	
1943	North Monastery	3-07	Thurles CBS	3-01
1944	St Flannan's College	4-05	Midleton CBS	2-02
1945	St Flannan's College	2-06	North Monastery	3-02
1946	St Flannan's College	4-05	North Monastery	2-01
1947	St Flannan's College	4-05	St Colman's College	3-06
1948	St Colman's College	3-06, 6-04 (R)	St Flannan's College	4-03, 4-06 (R)
1949	St Colman's College	4-06	St Flannan's College	1-03
1950	Thurles CBS	7-03	Midleton CBS	2-00
1951	Thurles CBS	3-05	Sullivan's Quay CBS	1-03
1952	St Flannan's College	1-05	St Finbarr's College	1-03
1953	Mount Sion CBS	3-02	St Flannan's College	1-07
1954	St Flannan's College	2-11	Thurles CBS	3-05
1955	North Monastery	4-07	Limerick CBS	2-02
1956	Thurles CBS	2-05	North Monastery	2-03
1957	St Flannan's College	7-07	North Monastery	3-03
1958	St Flannan's College		Limerick CBS	
1959	Abbey CBS	1-09	St Flannan's College	2-04
1960	North Monastery	0-10	Thurles CBS	1-04
1961	North Monastery	4-06	Thurles CBS	2-05
1962	Rice College	4-02	St Flannan's College	2-07
1963	St Finbarr's College	4-09	Rice College	4-03
1964	Limerick CBS	6-10	St Flannan's College	4-07
1965	Limerick CBS	4-06	De La Salle College Waterford	1-05
1966	Limerick CBS	6-05	Thurles CBS	5-03
1967	Limerick CBS	4-09	St Finbarr's College	1-05
1968	Coláiste Chríost Rí	5-09	Limerick CBS	5-04
1969	St Finbarr's College	6-11	Coláiste Chríost Rí	2-07
1970	North Monastery	6-05	Limerick CBS	4-07
1971	St Finbarr's College	4-12	St Flannan's College	2-04
1972	St Finbarr's College	6-11	St Flannan's College	2-07
1973	St Finbarr's College	5-14	Cashel CBS	2-05
1974	St Finbarr's College	10-11	Limerick CBS	2-02
1975	Colaiste Iognáid Ris	5-06	Limerick CBS	2-04
1976	St Flannan's College	2-09	De La Salle College Waterford	2-04
1977	St Colman's College	0-07	St Flannan's College	0-03
1978	Templemore CBS	3-05	St Flannan's College	2-05
1979	St Flannan's College	2-11	North Monastery	1-03
1980	North Monastery	3-06, 2-10 (R)	St Colman's College	2-09, 2-05 (R)
1981	North Monastery	2-06	Coláiste Chríost Rí	1-07
1982	St Flannan's College	2-07	North Monastery	1-07
1983	St Flannan's College	0-09, 1-06 (R)	North Monastery	0-09, 0-07 (R)
1984	St Finbarr's College	4-09	Limerick CBS	1-07
1985	North Monastery	5-06	St Flannan's College	1-07
1986	North Monastery	1-12	Midleton CBS	0-09
1987	St Flannan's College	3-12	Midleton CBS	2-06
1988	Midleton CBS	2-07	Thurles CBS	2-03
1989	St Flannan's College	0-09	Shannon Comprehensive School	0-05
1990	St Flannan's College	0-10	Nenagh CBS	0-03
1991	St Flannan's College	4-16	North Monastery	1-07
1992	St Colman's College	3-14	St Flannan's College	3-11
1993	Limerick CBS	5-05	St Flannan's College	1-12
1994	North Monastery	1-09	Midleton CBS	0-04
1995	Midleton CBS	3-18	Lismore CBS	3-05
1996	St Colman's College	3-19	Nenagh CBS	1-04
1997	St Colman's College	1-17	Nenagh CBS	0-08
1998	St Flannan's College	0-12	Limerick CBS	0-05
1999	St Flannan's College	1-14	St Finbarr's College	1-08
2000	St Flannan's College	3-14	Our Lady's Secondary School	3-08
2001	St Colman's College	2-12	St Flannan's College	0-15
2002	St Colman's College	2-18	Our Lady's Secondary School	0-06
2003	St Colman's College	1-06, 2-13 (R)	St Flannan's College	1-06, 0-08 (R)
2004	St Flannan's College	3-15	Coláistí na Déise	1-08
2005	St Flannan's College	1-11	Thurles CBS	1-06
2006	Midleton CBS	2-08	St Flannan's College	0-12
2007	De La Salle College Waterford	2-09	St Flannan's College	0-11
2008	De La Salle College Waterford	1-11	Thurles CBS	0-07
2009	Thurles CBS	3-15	St Caimin's Community School	0-10
2010	Ardscoil Rís	3-15	Thurles CBS	0-14
2011	Ardscoil Rís	3-19	Charleville CBS	0-03
2012	Colaiste na nDéise	2-14	Nenagh CBS	1-10
2013	Dungarvan Colleges	2-21	Our Lady's Secondary School	1-11
2014	Ardscoil Rís	2-13	Scoil na Troinoide, Doon	0-04
2015	Thurles CBS	2-12	St Francis College Rochestown	1-12
2016	Ardscoil Rís	0-11	Our Lady's Secondary School	0-08
2017	Our Lady's Secondary School	2-22	St Colman's College	1-06
2018	Ardscoil Rís	3-18	Midleton CBS	2-10
2019	Midleton CBS	2-12	Christian Brothers College	0-14
2020	St Flannan's College	1-15	Christian Brothers College	1-12
2021	Cancelled due to the COVID-19 pandemic			
2022	St Joseph's Secondary School	1-17	Ardscoil Rís	1-14
2023	Cashel Community School	0-12	Thurles CBS	0-11
2024	Nenagh CBS	2-16	Ardscoil Rís	0-21
2025	Thurles CBS	1-13	St Flannan's College	0-13
2026	Nenagh CBS	0-20	St Flannan's College	0-18

== Records and statistics ==
=== Final ===
- Most wins: 22:
  - St Flannan's College (1944, 1945, 1946, 1947, 1952, 1954, 1957, 1958, 1976, 1979, 1982, 1983, 1987, 1989, 1990, 1991, 1998, 1999, 2000, 2004, 2005, 2020)
- Most consecutive wins: 4:
  - North Monastery (1934, 1935, 1936, 1937)
  - St Flannan's College (1944, 1945, 1946, 1947)
  - Limerick CBS (1964, 1965, 1966, 1967)
  - St Finbarr's College (1971, 1972, 1973, 1974)
- Most second-place finishes: 18:
  - St Flannan's College (1927, 1948, 1949, 1953, 1959, 1962, 1964, 1971, 1972, 1977, 1978, 1985, 1992, 1993, 2001, 2003, 2006, 2007, 2025)
- Most appearances: 41:
  - St Flannan's College (1927, 1944, 1945, 1946, 1947, 1948, 1949, 1952, 1953, 1954, 1957, 1958, 1959, 1962, 1964, 1971, 1972, 1976, 1977, 1978, 1979, 1982, 1983, 1985, 1987, 1989, 1990, 1991, 1992, 1993, 1998, 1999, 2000, 2001, 2003, 2004, 2005, 2006, 2007, 2020, 2025)
- Most appearances without winning: 3:
  - Christian Brothers College, Cork (1918, 2019, 2020)

==== By decade ====
The most successful college of each decade, judged by number of Dr Harty Cup titles, is as follows:

- 1910s: 1 each for Rockwell College (1918) and North Monastery (1919)
- 1920s: 4 for Limerick CBS (1920-25-26-27)
- 1930s: 4 for North Monastery (1934-35-36-37)
- 1940s: 4 each for North Monastery (1940-41-42-43) and St Flannan's College (1944-45-46-47)
- 1950s: 4 for St Flannan's College (1952-54-57-58)
- 1960s: 4 for Limerick CBS (1964-65-66-67)
- 1970s: 4 for St Finbarr's College (1971-72-73-74)
- 1980s: 4 each for North Monastery (1980-81-85-86) and St Flannan's College (1982-83-87-89)
- 1990s: 4 for St Flannan's College (1990-91-98-99)
- 2000s: 3 each for St Flannan's College (2000-04-05) and St Colman's College (2001-02-03)
- 2010s: 5 for Ardscoil Rís (2010-11-14-16-18)

==== Gaps ====
Longest gaps between successive championship titles:

- 53 years: Thurles CBS (1956–2009)
- 32 years: Limerick CBS (1932–1964)
- 28 years: St Colman's College (1949–1977)
- 26 years: Limerick CBS (1967–1993)
- 18 years: St Flannan's College (1958–1976)

== See also ==
- List of Dr Harty Cup winning teams
- Dean Ryan Cup
