= 1934–35 Harty Cup =

Hurling tournament

1934–35 Dr Harty Cup
- Dates: 23 February – 8 May 1935
- Teams: 7
- Champions: North Monastery (4th title); Connie Buckley (captain)
- Runners-up: Rockwell College

Tournament statistics
- Matches played: 8
- Goals scored: 70 (8.75 per match)
- Points scored: 34 (4.25 per match)

The 1934–35 Harty Cup was the 16th staging of the Harty Cup since the establishment of the hurling competition by the Munster Council of the Gaelic Athletic Association in 1918. Vocational schools were invited to take part for the first time. The draw for the opening round fixtures took place on 19 February 1935. The competition contested from 23 February to 8 May 1935 at the Mitchelstown Athletic Grounds.

North Monastery would successfully defend its title rematch at the Harty Cup final 4–08 to 3–02, on 8 May 1935 against Rockwell College, their second consecutive meeting in the final and North Monastery's fourth successive Harty Cup title overall and second consecutive win.

== Results ==
=== First round ===
23 February 1935 First round	North Monastery	7-05 - 3-02	Limerick Vocational School	Charleville Grounds

28 February 1935 First round	Doon CBS	4-02 - 4-02	Thurles CBS	Clonmel GAA Ground

2 March 1935 First round	Ennis CBS	0-00 - 15-00	Rockwell College	St Munchin's College Grounds

18 March 1935 First round replay	Doon CBS	3-02 - 4-02	Thurles CBS	Clonmel GAA Ground

- Mount Sion CBS received a bye in this round.

=== Semi-finals ===
10 March 1935 Semi-final	Mount Sion CBS	0-00 - 9-03	North Monastery	Lismore Gaelic Grounds

11 April 1935 Semi-final	Rockwell College	4-01 - 4-01	Thurles CBS	Clonmel GAA Ground

15 April 1935 Semi-final replay	Rockwell College	6-02 - 0-02	Thurles CBS	Thurles Sportsfield

=== Final ===
8 May 1935 Final	North Monastery	4-08 - 3-02	Rockwell College	Mitchelstown Athletic Grounds
