= 1935–36 Harty Cup =

Hurling tournament

1935–36 Dr Harty Cup
- Dates: 22 February – 17 March 1936
- Teams: 6
- Champions: North Monastery (5th title)
- Runners-up: Mount Sion CBS

Tournament statistics
- Matches played: 5
- Goals scored: 30 (6 per match)
- Points scored: 33 (6.6 per match)

The 1935–36 Harty Cup was the 17th staging of the Harty Cup since the establishment of the hurling competition by the Munster Council of the Gaelic Athletic Association in 1918. The draw for the opening round fixtures took place on 19 October 1935. The competition contested from 22 February to 17 March 1936 at Páirc Mac Gearailt in Fermoy.

North Monastery successfully defended its title. at the Harty Cup final, 4–03 to 2–06, on 17 March 1936 against Coláiste na Mumhan, in what was their first ever meeting in the final and North Monestary's fifth successive Harty Cup title overall and first set of three consecutive titles.

== Results ==
=== First round ===
22 February 1936 First round	Coláiste na Mumhan	8-00 - 3-01	Ennis CBS	Gaelic Grounds

22 February 1936 First round	Mount Sion CBS	3-02 - 2-04	Doon CBS	Clonmel GAA Ground

23 February 1936 First round	Rockwell College	2-10 - 3-01	North Monastery	Douglas Grounds

=== Second round ===
7 March 1936 Second round	Mount Sion CBS	1-01 - 2-05	Coláiste na Mumhan	Castle Grounds

- North Monastery received a bye in this round.

=== Final ===
17 March 1936 Final	North Monastery	4-03 - 2-06	Coláiste na Mumhan	Páirc Mac Gearailt
