= Jerome Boylan =

Irish hurler

Personal information
- Native name: Diarmuid Ó Baíolláin (Irish)
- Nickname: Synman
- Born: 11 July 1999 (age 27) Caherdavin, Limerick, Ireland
- Occupation: Future Chartered Accountant
- Height: 4 ft 9 in (145 cm)

Sport
- Sport: Hurling
- Position: Right corner-back
Club
- Years: Club
- Na Piarsaigh
Club titles
- Limerick titles: 2
- Munster titles: 1
- All-Ireland Titles: 0
Inter-county**
Years	County	Apps (scores)
2019-present	Limerick	1 (0-00)
Inter-county titles
- Munster titles: 1
- All-Irelands: 1
- NHL: 1
- All Stars: 0
- **Inter County team apps and scores correct as of 18:58, 15 November 2020.

Jerome Boylan (born 11 July 1999) is an Irish hurler who plays for Limerick Senior Championship club Na Piarsaigh and at inter-county level with the Limerick senior hurling team.

== Career statistics ==
As of match played 13 June 2021.

Team	Year	National League			Munster		All-Ireland		Total	
Team	Year	Division	Apps	Score	Apps	Score	Apps	Score	Apps	Score
Limerick	2020	Division 1A	0	0-00	0	0-00	0	0-00	0	0-00
Limerick	2021		2	0-00	0	0-00	0	0-00	2	0-00
Career total			2	0-00	0	0-00	0	0-00	2	0-00

== Honours ==
Ardscoil Rís

- Dr Harty Cup (2): 2016, 2018
- Dean Ryan Cup (1): 2016

Na Piarsaigh

- Munster Senior Club Hurling Championship (1): 2017
- Limerick Senior Hurling Championship (2): 2017, 2020

Limerick

- All-Ireland Senior Hurling Championship (1): 2020
- Munster Senior Hurling Championship (1): 2020
- National Hurling League (1): 2020
