= Sam Quirke =

Irish hurler

Personal information
- Native name: Somhairle Ó Coirc (Irish)
- Born: 2002 (age 23–24) Midleton, County Cork, Ireland
- Occupation: Student

Sport
- Sport: Hurling
- Position: Midfield
Club
- Years: Club
- Midleton
Club titles
- Cork titles: 1
College
- Years: College
- 2020–present: MTU Cork
College titles
- Fitzgibbon titles: 0
Inter-county*
Years	County	Apps (scores)
2021–present	Cork	0 (0-00)
Inter-county titles
- Munster titles: 0
- All-Irelands: 0
- NHL: 0
- All Stars: 0
- *Inter County team apps and scores correct as of 15:52, 12 December 2021.

Sam Quirke (born 2002) is an Irish hurler who plays for Cork Senior Championship club Midleton. He also joined the Cork senior hurling team in advance of the 2022 season.

== Career ==
Quirke first played hurling competitively as a schoolboy with Midleton CBS Secondary School with whom he won a Harty Cup title in 2019. He later progressed onto the Midleton club team, following in the footsteps of his uncle David Quirke, and won a Premier SHC title in 2021. By this stage Quirke had won consecutive All-Ireland Under-20 Championship titles with the Cork under-20 team in 2020 and 2021. His performances in this grade earned a call-up to the senior team training panel in December 2021.

== Career statistics ==
As of 13 February 2022.

Team	Year	National League			Munster		All-Ireland		Total	
Team	Year	Division	Apps	Score	Apps	Score	Apps	Score	Apps	Score
Cork	2022	Division 1A	1	0-01	0	0-00	0	0-00	1	0-01
Career total			1	0-01	0	0-00	0	0-00	1	0-01

== Honours ==
Midleton CBS

- Harty Cup: 2019

Midleton

- Cork Premier Senior Hurling Championship: 2021

Cork

- All-Ireland Under-20 Hurling Championship: 2020, 2021
- Munster Under-20 Hurling Championship: 2020, 2021
