= Keith Matthews (rugby union) =

Irish rugby union player

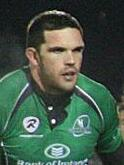
- Born: Keith Matthews; 10 June 1982 (age 44) Limerick, Ireland
- Height: 5 ft 10 in (1.78 m)
- Weight: 14 st (89 kg)
- School: Ardscoil Ris
- University: University of Limerick

Rugby union career
- Position: Centre
Senior career
Years	Team	Apps	(Points)
2003-04	Munster	2	(0)
2004-11	Connacht	100	
International career
Years	Team	Apps	(Points)
2009-10	Wolfhounds	7	(0)

Keith Matthews (born 10 June 1982) is an Irish rugby union player for Connacht in the United Rugby Championship. He has played for the Ireland Wolfhounds, Ireland under 21s, Ireland Schoolboys and went on Ireland's 2009 tour to North America. Matthews previously played with Munster and UL Bohemians. Matthews previously attended Ardscoil Ris and the University of Limerick.

He plays as a centre.

Matthews was forced into retirement through injury on 29 November 2011.
