= Jeremiah Dermot O'Connell =

Catholic Priest, educator (1935 – 2018)

- Title: Reverend Father

Personal life
- Born: Jeremiah Dermot O'Connell; September 1, 1935 Cloone, County Leitrim, Ireland
- Died: March 14, 2018 (aged 82) Dublin, Ireland

Religious life
- Religion: Catholic
- Institute: Order of St. Patrick

Jeremiah Dermot O'Connell, MFR (September 1, 1935 – March 14, 2018) was a Catholic Priest, educator, and administrator, recognized as the longest serving school principal in Nigeria. He served as a school principal for 50 years, and lived in Nigeria for 56 years.

== Early life and education ==
Jeremiah Dermot O'Connell, born in Cloone, Castletown Roche in County Cork, Ireland. He was educated at Castletown Roche National School from 1940 to 1948, before proceeding to St Colman's College, Fermoy, where he completed his secondary education as a boarder. He received his Leaving Certificate in 1953 and enrolled at University College Cork, earning his B.A. degree in June 1957. Subsequently, he pursued theological studies with the Kiltegan Fathers, culminating in his ordination as a priest on Easter Sunday, April 2, 1961, at St Mary's Church, Killamoat.

== Career ==
After his ordination in 1961, O'Connell arrived Nigeria and commenced his service working in the Diocese of Calabar as a missionary of the Order of St. Patrick, the patron Saint of Ireland. He worked at St Columbanus Secondary School, Ikwen in Calabar before taking up an appointment to the Prefecture of Minna in 1963. His tenure in Minna spanned 54 years. Initially teaching at St Malachy's Teacher Training College, he moved to Fatima Co-ed Secondary School (later renamed Government Secondary School and currently known as Fr O'Connell Science College Minna), where he remained until his departure from Nigeria in April 2017. While in Minna as a school principal, he lived in presbyteries. For many years, he lived in the presbytery of St Michael's Cathedral Parish and later at the presbytery of Our Lady of Fatima Parish where he was Father-in-Charge.

In recognition of his service, former President Olusegun Obasanjo honored him with the national honor of Member of the Federal Republic (MFR). He was ceremoniously bestowed with the traditional title of Jagaban Ilimi Minna (Shining light of education in Minna) by the Emir of Minna, Umar Farouq Bahago.

== Death and legacy ==
O'Connell was commemorated by the Niger State Government, which renamed the Government Secondary School as Fr. O'Connell College, Minna, in his honor.

He died on March 14, 2018.
