= Dungarvan CBS =

School in County Waterford, Ireland

Dungarvan CBS (Irish: Scoil na mBráithre, Dungarbhan) is a secondary school in Dungarvan, County Waterford, Ireland. It was founded in 1807, and is one of the oldest Christian Brothers schools in the world. As of 2018, over 300 students were enrolled in the school. As of mid-2022, the principal was Agnes Guerin. Dungarvan CBS supports the Junior Cycle and Senior Cycle curriculum, and also offers an optional Transition Year programme.

== Notable alumni ==
- Jamie Costin, Olympic race walker
