= St. Joseph's CBS Nenagh =

Location
- Summerhill, Nenagh, County Tipperary, E45 F890; Ireland; 52.866482°N 8.192091°W

Information
- Type: Boys-only voluntary secondary school
- Motto: Success Through Effort
- Religious affiliation: Catholic
- Established: 1862
- Founder: Congregation of Christian Brothers
- Oversight: Edmund Rice Schools Trust (ERST)
- Principal: Karen O’Donnell
- Gender: Boys
- Age range: 11–18
- Enrollment: 720 (2025)
- Color
- Website: Official website

St. Joseph's CBS Nenagh is an 11–18 year old boys secondary school in the Summerhill area of Nenagh, a town in County Tipperary, Ireland. Established in 1862 by the Congregation of Christian Brothers, the school moved to its current site in Summerhill in 1970. The number of boys enrolled at the school stood at 720 in 2025.

== Overview ==
=== History ===
The school was founded by the Congregation of Christian Brothers (CBS) in 1862 at John's Lane before moving to its current campus at Summerhill in Nenagh in 1970.

The school shares its current campus with Nenagh CBS Primary School, and enrols boys from a wide catchment area in the local area and beyond.

=== Admissions ===
The Admission Policy for St. Joseph's CBS Nenagh is complainant with the requirements outlined within the Education Act 1998 of the Republic of Ireland, the Education (Admission to Schools) Act 2018 and the Equal Status Act 2000, all pieces of legislation passed by the Irish Government.

As the school is a Catholic all boys voluntary secondary school, it operations within a Catholic ethos and is placed under the trusteeship of the Edmund Rice Schools Trust. Schools which operate under a "Catholic Ethos" within the context of a Catholic voluntary secondary school such as St. Joseph's CBS Nenagh, means the ethos and characteristic spirit of the Catholic Church apply across the schools operations. The ethos aims at promoting "full and harmonious development of all aspects of the person of the pupil", "a living relationship with God and with other people", "philosophy of life inspired by belief in God and in the life", "death and resurrection of Jesus" and "the formation of the pupils in the Catholic faith".

The school promotes certain religious values, and as such may refuse to admit a boy who is not of the Catholic faith and it is deemed that the refusal of boy concerned is essential for the maintenance and upholding of the ethos of the school.

=== Standards and uniform ===
The school launched a new school uniform in September 2012 and is compulsory for all boys to wear. Boys in the Junior school wear a blue jumper, whereas boys in the Senior school wear a purple jumper. Whilst the school states that all boys must wear black leather school shoes, the only exception the school has made in this regards is allowing boys to wear navy deck shoes. Any boy found to be in breach of this rule will be asked to remove their footwear and change into the expected type of footwear.

Additionally, boys are not permitted to wear any other form of school jacket, including branded, other than the school jacket displaying the school badge.

== Curriculum and attainment ==
=== Junior Cycle ===
For boys in their first year at the school, a "taster" programme is offered known as the Junior Cycle, designed to give boys an idea of what their time at the school will entail.

==== Core Exam subjects (Junior) ====
The following subjects are offered to boys in the Junior Cycle:

- English
- Irish language
- Mathematics
- Geography
- History
- Science
- Religious Education (Core non-exam subject)

==== Optional Exam subjects ====
- Business Studies
- French
- German
- Graphics
- Music
- Visual Arts
- Wood Technology

==== Wellbeing Programme ====
- Physical Education
- C.S.P.E
- S.P.H.E
- Information Technology
- Literacy
- Numeracy
- Guidance
- Personal Development

=== Senior Cycle ===
==== Core Exam subjects ====
- English
- Irish language
- Mathematics

==== Core non-exam subjects ====
- Career Guidance
- Information Technology
- Personal Development
- Physical Education
- Religious Education

==== Optional Exam subjects ====
- Accounting
- Agricultural Science
- Applied Mathematics
- Art
- Biology
- Business
- Chemistry
- Construction Studies
- Design and Communication Graphics
- Economics
- French
- Geography
- German
- History
- L.C.V.P
- Music
- Physics
- Physical Education

== See also ==
- Congregation of Christian Brothers
- List of Christian Brothers schools
