= CBS Sexton Street =

School in Limerick, Ireland

Coordinates: 52°39′35″N 8°37′18″W

CBS Sexton Street (also referred to as Coláiste Mhichíl) is a Christian Brothers secondary school in Limerick, Ireland. The school has approximately 340 students, all male. As of 2025 the principal was Denis O'Connor.

== History ==
Coláiste Mhichíl was founded by Edmund Rice, a Christian Brother, to provide education for boys in Limerick city.

Financier JP McManus, a past pupil of the school, has funded academic scholarships for a number of students each year going to third level.

== Notable students ==
- Ned Daly, born in 1891 and educated by the Presentation Sisters and then the Christian Brothers on Sexton Street. He served as commandant of Dublin's 1st Battalion in the Easter Rising. He was executed by firing squad in Kilmainham Gaol on 4 May 1916.
- John Philip Holland, born in Liscannor, County Clare in 1841. Holland began his studies at Sexton Street in 1853. He was the developer of the first submarines to be commissioned by both the United States Navy and Royal Navy.
- David Hanly, presenter of Morning Ireland on RTÉ Radio 1
- Tony Holohan, Chief Medical Officer for Ireland
- Ciaran MacMathuna, broadcaster and authority on Irish music
- J. P. McManus, businessman and racehorse owner
- Diarmuid Scully, member of Limerick City Council and former Mayor of Limerick
- Karl Spain, comedian
- Dermot Kelly (hurler), former Limerick Hurler
- John Moran (mayor of Limerick), first directly elected mayor of Limerick in the 2024 limerick mayor election

== Notable teachers ==
- Pat Fleury, hurler
- Willie Moore, hurler
