= St Colman's College, Fermoy =

Secondary school in Fermoy, Ireland

St Colman's College
- Coláiste Cholmáin
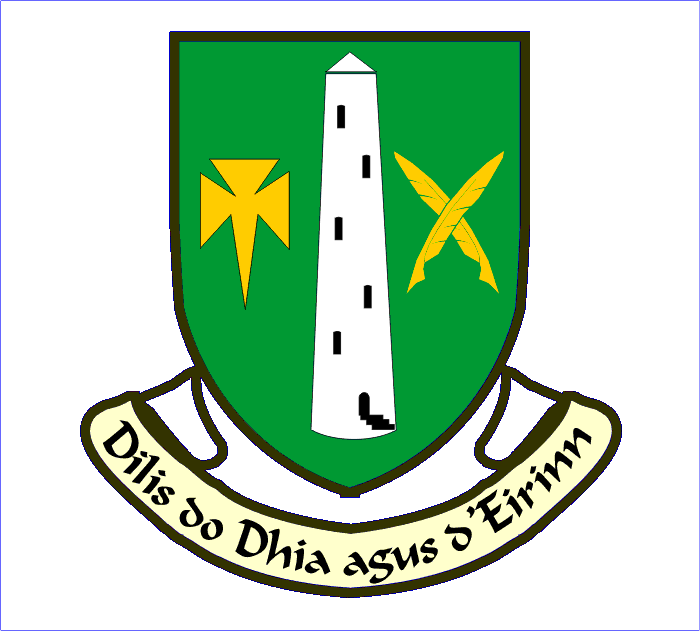

Location
- Fermoy; Ireland
- Coordinates: 52.137192°N 8.27903°W

Information
- Religious affiliation: Roman Catholic
- Established: 1858; 168 years ago
- Principal: Sean Lane
- Gender: Male
- Enrollment: 541
- Colours: Green & White
- Former pupils: Colmanites
- Website: stcolmanscollege.com
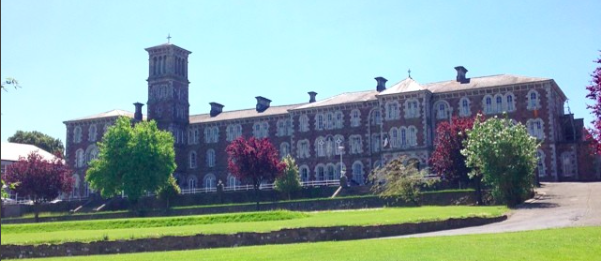
- The old building of St. Colman's College

St Colman's College (Irish: Coláiste Cholmáin) is an all-boys voluntary secondary school, and former boarding school, in Fermoy, County Cork. The college was founded in 1856 and opened in 1858 as the diocesan college of the Roman Catholic Diocese of Cloyne. Archbishop Thomas Croke, after whom Croke Park is named, became the school's first president in this year.

== History ==
The site upon which St. Colman's was built was bought by Fr. Timothy Murphy in 1856. Murphy commissioned John Pine Hurley to design the new college building. Twenty months after construction began, St. Colman's opened its doors to its first students in 1858. The original college building is three storeys in height and has a six-storey tower. The façade is of red sandstone, with limestone facings. The building, with its tall tower, has since become an iconic structure in Fermoy and looms over the town's skyline. A west wing was added in 1887 while the school chapel was added in the early 1900s. A new classroom block was added to the college in 1969. This new block had a large assembly hall and twenty-two classrooms. A library in the college, known among the students and faculty as the 'Priest's Library', houses a number of rare manuscripts and books. From the very beginning, St. Colman's welcomed boarders from all over Munster; however, boarding ceased in the college in 2003.

== Sport ==
The college has traditionally played hurling and has won the Dr. Harty Cup nine times (1948, 1949, 1977, 1992, 1996, 1997, 2001, 2002 & 2003).

In addition to hurling, the school also participates equestrianism, pitch and putt, tennis, swimming, cricket, basketball and badminton. The school also plays rugby, and former Leinster and Ireland prop Mike Ross is a past pupil.

The St. Colman's Health & Fitness Campus, a redevelopment of the college's sports grounds, was opened in 2015. The project included the building of new dressing rooms and showers, three full sized tennis courts and a fitness walkway around the Harty pitch.

== Notable alumni ==
=== Arts ===
- John Stanislaus Joyce, father of writer James Joyce
- Peadar Ua Laoghaire, writer and priest
- Canon Sheehan of Doneraile, writer and priest

=== Sports ===
- Liam Kearney, professional footballer
- Canon Bertie Troy, Cork hurling manager, photographer, and faculty of the college (1957–1977)
- Mike Ross, Irish rugby player
- Andrew O'Shaughnessy, Limerick hurler, All Ireland finalist 2007
- Stephen Molumphy, Waterford hurler, All Ireland finalist 2008
- Aidan Kearney, Waterford hurler, All Ireland finalist 2008
- Timmy McCarthy, Cork hurler, All Ireland winner 1999, 2004, 2005
- Brian Murphy, Cork hurler, All Ireland champion 2004/05
- Fergal McCormack, Cork hurler, All Ireland champion 1999
- Mark Landers, Cork senior hurling winning captain 1999
- Seánie O'Leary, Cork hurler, All Ireland Winner 1976/77/78/1984
- Barry Murphy, Clare All Ireland hurling champion 1997
- Colm Spillane, Cork senior hurler, Munster winner 2017
- Niall O'Leary, Cork senior hurler, All Ireland finalist 2021
- Bertie Troy, also taught at the school
- Joe O'Brien-Whitmarsh, association footballer

=== Christian mission ===
- William Barry DD (1872–1929), Archbishop of Hobart, Tasmania
- David Keane, Bishop of Limerick (RC) 1923–1945
- Fachtna O'Driscoll, Superior General of the Society of African Missions worldwide, 2013–2019.
- Rev. Fr. Jeremiah Dermot O'Connell, longest serving principal in Nigeria

=== Other ===
- Thomas McDonagh, one of the seven signatories of the 1916 Proclamation, taught at St. Colman's for a time.
