= Rice College =

Rice College CBS
- Coláiste an Rísigh

Location
- New Road; Ennis, County Clare; Ireland
- Coordinates: 52°50′53″N 8°58′46″W

Information
- Religious affiliation: Catholic
- Established: 1826; 200 years ago
- Principal: Louis Mulqueen
- Staff: 47+
- Enrollment: 700
- Website: www.ricecollege.ie

Rice College (Coláiste an Rísigh in Irish) is a secondary school in Ennis, County Clare, Ireland founded in 1826. It is also a C.B.S with a house on the property where "Brothers" still reside. No Brothers teach in the secondary school but it was previously run by the religious order. It was formerly an all-boys school, although girls were first admitted to repeat their leaving certificate examinations in 1985, it became coeducational in 1997. In 2006 construction started on an extension and was completed in early 2007.

== Sport ==
In 1962, Rice College won their only Dr. Harty Cup (Munster 'A' Colleges Hurling), defeating bitter local rivals and twenty-one times champions, St. Flannan's, Ennis in the final in front of a sell-out crowd in Cusack Park. As a result of this they went on to compete in the Dr. Croke Cup (All-Ireland 'A' Colleges Hurling) final later that year, losing out to St. Peter's College, Wexford in a tight affair.

Rice College also competed in the 1963 Dr. Harty Cup decider but lost out to St. Finbarr's, Cork.

On 15 December 2021, Rice College defeated Our Lady's, Templemore in the Munster Under 16 ½ B Corn Shéamuis Uí Dhonnchú final on a scoreline of 1–15 to 1-09, ending a 42-year drought since the school's last win in 1979. En route to the final they dismissed Castletroy College, St. Joseph's Tulla, John the Baptist CS Hospital and Charleville CBS, scoring a combined total of 13–85.

== Alumni ==
- Kevin Keane (b. 1990) - Gaelic footballer
- Ethan Coughlan (b. 2002) - rugby union player
- Shane Meehan (b. 2002) - hurler
- Declan Shalvey (b. 1982) - comics artist and writer
