= Ardscoil Rís, Limerick =

Secondary school in Limerick, Ireland

Coordinates: 52°39′56″N 8°38′26″W

Ardscoil Rís
- North Circular Road, Limerick, Ireland

Information
- Type: Public Christian Brothers secondary
- Motto: Honor Ante Gloriam
- Religious affiliation: Roman Catholic
- Established: 1963
- Enrollment: c. 720 (2024)

Ardscoil Rís is a voluntary, all-boys, Roman Catholic secondary school in Limerick, Ireland. Founded in 1963, it is located on the North Circular Road.

== History ==
Ardscoil Rís was formally opened by the Christian Brothers, on the North Circular Road in Limerick, on 1 September 1963. It welcomed 52 pupils in its first year and classes were held in an old school house until the first purpose-built classrooms were available. This first intake included Pat Cox, who later became a politician.

From its foundation, the school was managed by the Christian Brothers. In 1989, a board of management, representing trustees, staff and parents, was put in place and a lay principal was appointed. From these beginnings, the school, augmented by periodic extensions, grew. By 2018, it had grown to over 740 students and had fifty teaching staff.

A team from the school won the RTÉ television secondary schools quiz programme Blackboard Jungle in 1993.

The late twentieth century witnessed the contraction of religious orders in Ireland. Ardscoil Rís's last remaining Christian Brothers had retired from teaching duties by the mid-2000s and the school is now staffed entirely by lay teachers. The Christian Brothers maintain ownership and trusteeship of the school and are represented on the board of management by four lay representatives.

In 2010, the redevelopment of the school went to the construction stage following almost a decade of lobbying and planning. Acting as main contractor for the project, Cordil Construction were responsible for the management of the €5 million plan, which saw the school expand to three times the usable space on completion of all three phases. Construction was temporarily abandoned in 2011 due to the liquidation of Cordil Construction, but continued following a seventeen-month delay. The new school was official opened in March 2014 by Limerick City TD and then Minister for Finance, Michael Noonan.

== Sport ==
Rugby, hurling and field hockey are the main sporting activities of the school. Teams representing the school have won the Munster Schools Senior Cup and Junior Cup competitions (rugby), the Dr. Harty Cup (Munster 'A' Colleges Hurling), the Dean Ryan Cup (Munster 'A' Colleges Under-16 hurling) and the White Cup (Munster 'A' Colleges Under 15 Hurling).

Ardscoil Rís is one of the most successful Limerick schools in hurling. In March 2010, Ard Scoil Ris became the first Limerick team since 1993 to win the Dr. Harty Cup (Munster schools hurling championship). They defeated the 2009 champions Thurles CBS after a third replay and lost to St. Kieran's College in the All-Ireland final later that year. In 2022, Arscoil Rís defeated St. Kierans college to win the Croke Cup, the All-Ireland senior hurling schools title. It was the first time the Croke Cup had been won by a Limerick side in over 50 years.

On 8 November 2014, Paul O'Connell captained Ireland against South Africa in the Aviva Stadium, Seán Cronin started at hooker and Dave Kilcoyne came on as a replacement in the 73rd minute, this was the first and only time that three past pupils of the school earned Ireland caps on the same day.

== Alumni ==
=== Politics ===
- Pat Cox (President of the European Parliament 2002–2004)
- Peter Power former (Minister of State, Fianna Fáil TD)
- Brian Leddin former (Green Party TD)
- Cathal Crowe (Fianna Fáil TD)

=== Sports ===
Limerick GAA

- David Breen
- Shane Dowling Limerick hurler and 2018 All-Ireland hurling winner.
- Kevin Downes
- John Galvin (Limerick footballer from 1998 to 2014).
- Declan Hannon Limerick hurler and 2018 All-Ireland hurling winner as captain.
- Cian Lynch, Limerick hurler and 2018 All-Ireland hurling winner.
- Ollie Moran Limerick GAA Limerick hurler from 1997 to 2009. All Star award 2007, 5 railway cup medals with Munster, Shinty/Hurling International with Ireland. Captained Limerick Senior Hurling team in 2005.
- Donncha Sheehan Limerick hurler from 2003 to 2009 and All-Ireland Under 21 Hurling Championship winning captain in 2000

Clare GAA

- Darach Honan Clare GAA Clare hurler. Munster and All Ireland U21 Hurling medal winner 2009. All Ireland Senior Hurling medal winner 2013. Named U21 Hurling Player of the Year in 2009.
- Conor Ryan Clare GAA Clare hurler. Munster and All Ireland U21 Hurling medal winner 2012. All Ireland Senior Hurling medal winner 2013. Man of the Match award for his performance in the 2013 All Ireland Hurling Final. GAA/GPA All Star award 2013.

Rugby

- Paul O'Connell Munster Rugby, Ireland international, and British and Irish Lions rugby captain).
- Dave Kilcoyne Munster Rugby & Ireland international
- Seán Cronin Leinster Rugby & Ireland international.
- Mike Sherry Munster Rugby & Ireland international.
- Craig Casey Munster Rugby & Ireland international.
- Keith Matthews Connacht Rugby & Ireland Wolfhounds.
- Stephen Fitzgerald former Munster Rugby & Ireland Under-20s & current Connacht Rugby player.
- Conor Fitzgerald Connacht Rugby & Ireland Under-20s player.
- Mossy Lawler Former Munster Rugby player & Connacht Rugby Academy Coach.

Other sports

- Derek Daly European Power Lifting Champion
- Sam Lynch, (Member of the Irish rowing team at the 1996 and 2004 Olympics and gold medallist at the World Rowing Championships in Lucerne, 2001 and Seville, 2002)

=== Music ===
- Blindboy Boatclub and Mr. Chrome, founders of The Rubberbandits, a comedy hip-hop group
