= De La Salle College Waterford =

Location
- Waterford, County Waterford, Ireland; 52°15′14″N 7°06′03″W

Information
- Motto: Latin: Praesis Ut Prosis; English: Lead in order to serve
- Established: 1894; 132 years ago
- Principal: Thomas Bourke
- Gender: Male
- Enrollment: 1090 (2024)
- Website: www.delasallewaterford.com/

De La Salle College Waterford is a secondary school in Waterford, Ireland with over 1,000 students and 90 teachers.

== De La Salle Teachers Training College ==
The De La Salle Brothers had a presence in Waterford since the 1870s, and opened a teacher training college at Newtown, Waterford in 1894. In 1894 Mr. J.L. Ahearn was appointed professor of irish, the first such appointment in a teacher training college. Students who completed the two year course were awarded the National Teacher(NT) qualification entitling them to teach in primary (national) schools.

In May 1939, lay teacher training ceased (male teacher training centered in St. Patrick's, Drumcondra), however, the De La Salle brothers continued to be trained for another 10 years, along with Marist and Presentation Brothers, in 1972 an agreement was made where brothers were trained alongside the christian brothers in St. Mary's College, Marino.

== Secondary school ==
A secondary school was opened on the site in the 1940s. In 1948 it officially opened as a Day and Boarding School. The boarding school closed in 1990, and from 1991 operated as a day school only. In 2008 it appointed its first lay principal, and in 2009 The Le Cheile Schools Trust became the trustee body for the school. School management was criticised in a 2012 Department of Education inspection report for taking on €500,000 in debts for refurbishments with little educational benefit, and for teachers teaching subjects for which they were not qualified, under the leadership of then principal Gearoid O' Brien.

== Sports and activities ==
=== Gaelic games ===
Gaelic games were always a significant sport in De La Salle College, both as a teachers college and secondary school. Seven former GAA presidents trained at De La Salle, and a number of inter-county players and managers have gone to school in the college. In 2007 and 2008, they won the Munster Schools Dr. Harty Cup and All-Ireland Dr. Croke Cup. In football, they won the Munster Schools Corn Uí Mhuirí in 1958, 1961, 1962, 1964 and 1965. The school is also linked to De La Salle GAA club.

=== Soccer ===
Two former Irish soccer internationals, Jim Beglin and John O'Shea, are among the school's past pupils. The school won the FAI Schools minor title in 2002 and in 2009.

=== Musical society ===
The musical society at De La Salle College performed its first musical in 1979: Joseph and the Amazing Technicolour Dreamcoat. The annual college musical is performed in the college hall each year. Most recently the college hosted We Will Rock You in October of 2023

== Notable alumni ==
- Jim Beglin - Soccer player (Liverpool, Leeds United, Ireland)
- John O'Shea - Soccer player (Manchester United, Ireland)
- John Mullane - Hurler
- Dave McCarthy - Gaelic footballer
- Val Doonican - Singer and TV entertainer
- Liam Griffin - Hurler, Manager Manager, won All-Ireland in 1996
- Maurice Cummins - politician, senator(leader of the seanad 2011–2016), Mayor of Waterford 1995-96.

=== Alumni of the teachers training college ===
- Thomas Ashe - Irish patriot and hunger striker
- Richard Barrett - Teacher, Republican, executed during the civil war in 1922
- Sean McCarthy - Teacher, TD and Cork Lord Mayor, GAA President 1932-1935
- Robert (Bob) O’Keeffe - Teacher, Hurler, GAA President 1935-1938
- Pádraig MacNamee - Teacher, GAA President 1938-1943(first from Ulster)
- Seamus Gardiner - Teacher, GAA President 1943-1946
- Dan O’Rourke - Teacher, TD, Senator, GAA President 1946-1949
- Seán Ó Súilleabháin - Teacher and Folklorist, with the Irish Folklore Commission
- Michael Kehoe - Teacher, GAA President 1949-1952
- Séamus Ó Riain - Teacher, GAA President 1967-1970
