= Our Lady's Secondary School, Templemore =

Our Lady's Secondary School
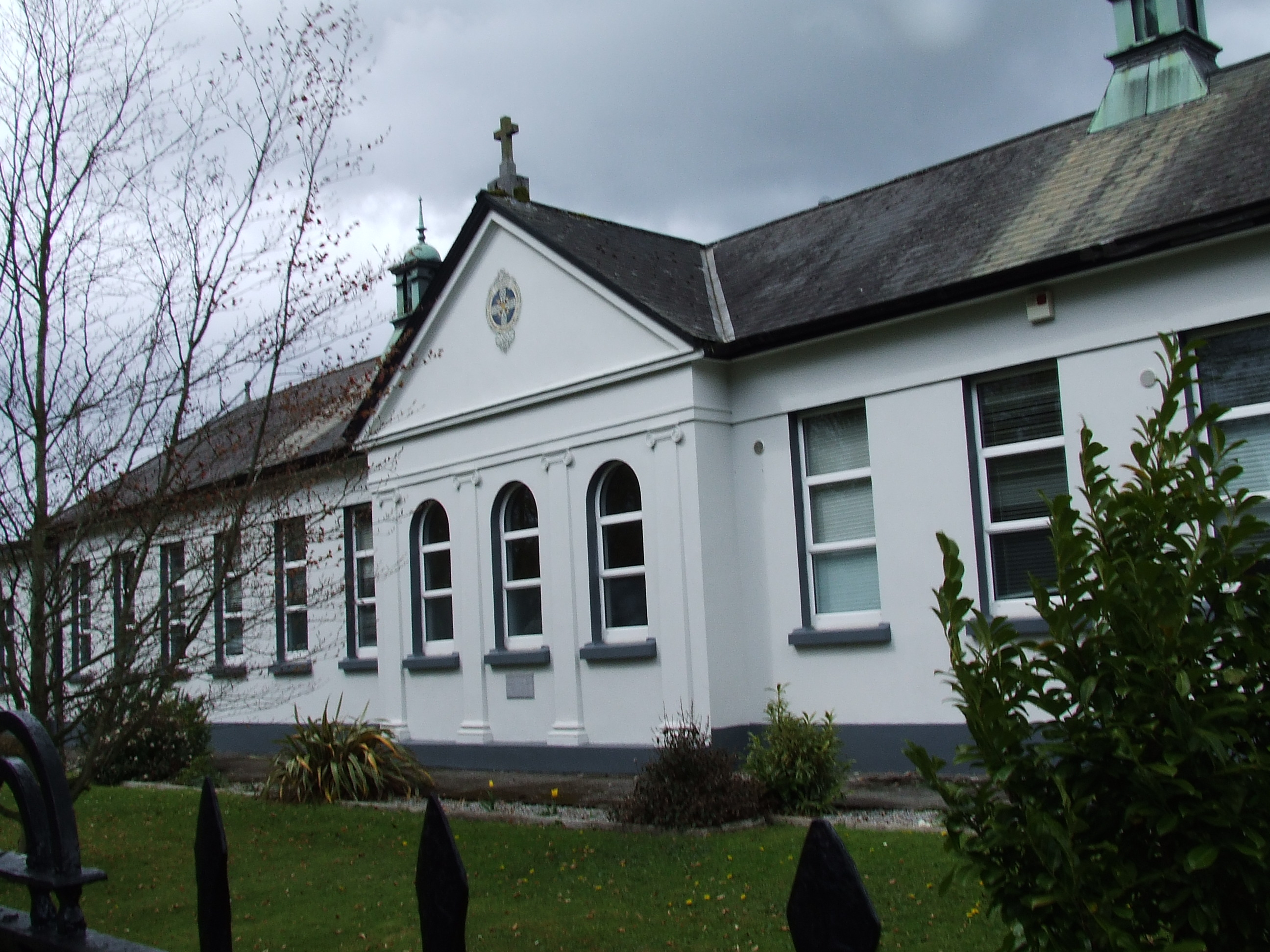
- Templemore, County Tipperary, Ireland

Information
- Type: Co-educational
- Motto: Misericordia (Mercy)
- Religious affiliation: Roman Catholic
- Established: 1986
- Principal: Paul Fogarty
- Colours: Maroon & White
- Website: ourladystemplemore.ie/find-us

Our Lady's Secondary School, Templemore, is a second-level school in Templemore, County Tipperary, Ireland. The school's motto (Latin: Misericordia) means "mercy". It is under the ethos of the Catholic Church and is located in the ecclesiastical parish of Templemore, Clonmore and Killea.

== History ==
The school was established when the Sisters of Mercy opened a convent in Templemore in 1863. In 1955 the Convent School became a Voluntary Secondary School, catering for around three hundred girls, including eighty boarders. The Christian Brothers School opened in 1932, providing secondary education for boys. In 1985, the two schools amalgamated to form Our Lady's Secondary School, combining the philosophies of Catherine McAuley and Edmund Ignatius Rice. Up to that point, the Christian Brothers School had been known as Templemore CBS. Co-operation had existed between the two communities since the 1930s.

In 2003, St. Sheelan's Vocational College ceased to provide secondary education and merged with Our Lady's to become the only secondary school in the town. In 2007, enrollment was approximately 500 students.

In 2007, the school began operating under the trusteeship of CEIST Catholic Education an Irish Schools Trust.

== Curriculum ==
The school teaches pupil from 1st to 6th years, including Transition Year. The school offers a number of subjects in both the Junior cycle (years 1, 2 & 3) and Senior cycle (years 5 & 6).

== Extra-curricular activities ==
Sporting and extra-curricular activities include basketball, debating, Gaelic football, hurling, association football (soccer) and athletics.

A number of pupils have worn the Tipperary jersey, including David Kennedy, Paul Ormond, Noel Morris, Pat McGrath, Tommy Dunne, Bobby Ryan and his brother Aidan Ryan. All of these hurlers have won All-Ireland hurling medals and some have also won Dr. Harty Cup medals. As Templemore CBS in 1978 the school won the Harty Cup and All-Ireland Colleges competitions in hurling. Bobby Ryan of Borrisoleigh captained Tipperary to All Ireland honours in 1989. Tommy Dunne of Toomevara captained Tipperary to their win in 2001.

== Past pupils ==
Past pupils include:

- Michael Smith, former Teachta Dála and Irish Government Minister
- Lt-General William O'Callaghan, former UNIFIL commander
- Damian Cullen, Health & Family Editor of The Irish Times

== See also ==
- St. Augustine's Industrial School for Girls
