= St Joseph's Secondary School, Tulla =

Location
- Tulla, County Clare; Ireland; 52.863722°N 8.761017°W

Information
- Motto: Be The Best You Can Be
- Established: 1950
- Principal: Juliet Coman
- Website: http://www.sjt.ie

St Joseph's Secondary School, Tulla

St Joseph's Secondary School, Tulla is an Irish co-educational secondary school located in Tulla, County Clare. It is a Roman Catholic secondary school under the trusteeship of CEIST (Catholic Education, an Irish Schools Trust).

== History ==
Secondary education began in Tulla in 1950, when 38 students enrolled in the Sisters of Mercy school behind the church. The first Leaving Certificate class graduated in 1954. Work on a new school began in 1956 and was completed the following year at a cost of £12,000. At that time 100 students were on the school rolls.

Due to expanding enrolment as a result of free second-level education it was decided to move to a new location in 1970 at Fogarty's Cross. The school worked on a split site for a while until the building was completed in 1985.

Plans were lodged for a new 650 pupil school in October 2013 and were given planning permission by the Clare County Council in March 2014. In April 2016, the new Public-Private Partnership (PPP) Strand 4 building opened and was occupied for the first time. The Minister for Education and Skills, Richard Bruton, TD, officially opened the school on 22 September 2016. It was officially blessed by Bishop Fintan Monaghan, Bishop of Killaloe and Fr Brendan Lawlor, School Chaplain.

== Academics ==
The curriculum offered at St Joseph's Secondary School includes:

- Junior Certificate
- Transition Year
- Leaving Certificate
- Leaving Certificate Vocational Programme (LCVP)
- Leaving Certificate Applied

== Alumni ==
- Adam Hogan (b. 2003) - hurler.
