= Midleton CBS Secondary School =

Midleton CBS

Location
- Midleton, Cork; Ireland
- Coordinates: 51.90699°N 8.17050°W

Information
- Type: Secondary school
- Motto: Ancora imparo
- Religious affiliation: Roman Catholic
- Established: 1867
- Principal: Niall Ahern
- Enrolment: 900 (+67 staff)
- Colours: Red and White
- Website: midletoncbs.ie

Midleton CBS Secondary School is a Catholic secondary school for boys, located in Midleton, County Cork, Ireland. Midleton CBS was founded by the Congregation of Christian Brothers in 1867.

== History ==
The Christian Brothers arrived in Midleton in 1867 at the request of the parish priest who recognized the need of a dedicated school to educate the town's Roman Catholic male youth, at a time when the Church of Ireland's Midleton College was fast expanding. The local community provided donations for the cost of the construction, and the school opened on 3 April 1867, with over 300 pupils joining in its first week. The last of the Christian Brothers left the school in 2003, with the monastery and old school building being taken over by the Diocese of Cloyne for parish use.

The school buildings were massively extended in the 2010s, in a project which cost €12.6 million.

== Curriculum ==
The school offers both the Junior and Leaving Certificate cycles. The curriculum teaches first years: Religion; Irish as L2; English as L1; Mathematics; French as L2; German as L2; Science; Business Studies; History; Geography; CSPE; SPHE; Woodwork; Technical Graphics; Art; Music; Technology and Physical Education. In second year, the students may choose to drop one of the (L2) foreign languages.

After completing the Junior Certificate, the school requires students to complete a mandatory Transition Year. In 5th year, students begin the Leaving Cert cycle. Irish as L2, English L1 and Mathematics are compulsory.

== Extra curricular ==
The school has a notable history in hurling, especially the Dr. Harty Cup which has been won a total of 4 times by the school. Midleton CBS also have a successful athletics set up and have won All-Ireland's in a number of athletic events.

== Notable alumni ==
- Brian Corcoran, former inter-county hurler, no.58 in 125 greatest hurlers and voted left corner-back in the Cork Hurling team of the century.
- Paul Townend 6 time Irish Jump Racing champion Jockey with numerous wins including 3 Gold cups and 28 total wins at the Cheltenham Festival.
- Cian O'Connor, former inter-county hurler.
- Conor Lehane, inter-county hurler.
- Luke O'Farrell, former inter-county hurler.
- John Fenton, former inter-county hurler, 1984 All-Ireland Hurling winning captain and several All-Stars to his name.
- Ger Fitzgerald, former inter-county hurler.
- Paddy Fitzgerald, former inter-county hurler.
- Ronan Dwane, former inter-county hurler.
- Kevin Hennessy, former inter-county hurler.
- Paudie O'Sullivan, former inter-county hurler.
- Diarmuid O'Sullivan, former inter-county hurler.
- Dónal Óg Cusack, former inter-county hurling goalkeeper, 2006 Hurler of the Year Nominee
- Conor Cusack, former inter-county hurler
- Joe Deane, former inter-county hurler.
- Eoghan Keniry, inter-county hurler.
- Donal Óg Cusack, former inter-county hurler and now a TV presenter with RTÉ.
- Brian Lawton, former inter-county hurler.
- Ciarán Joyce, inter-county hurler.
- Sean O'Leary-Hayes, inter-county hurler.
- Ciarán Cronin, former inter-county hurler.
