= North Monastery =

Educational campus in Cork City, Ireland

- Our Lady's Mount, North Monastery Road, Cork

Information
- Motto: Buan Dílseacht (Strong Loyalty)
- Patron saint: Br. Edmund Rice
- Established: 1811; 215 years ago
- Colours: Blue and white
- Website: http://northmonastery.ie/; http://www.gcm.ie/; http://northmonprimary.net/

The North Monastery (Irish: An Mhainistir Thuaidh), commonly known as The Mon, is a co-educational education campus comprising Scoil Mhuire Fatima Primary School, North Monastery Co-educational Secondary and Gaelcholáiste Mhuire AG, located at Our Lady's Mount, Cork, Ireland.

== History ==
The North Monastery was founded on 9 November 1811 when Brother Jerome O'Connor and Brother John Baptist Leonard were given charge of a school in Chapel Lane by the Bishop of Cork, Rev Dr Moylan. Seventeen students attended on the first day. In 1814, a 14-acre sloping site was acquired from a wealthy Catholic businessman, Sir George Goold, Baronet, and a new school was built. The North Monastery had found its permanent home. An outbreak of typhus fever in the city in 1816 saw the school being used as a temporary hospital.

Brother Griffin, a poet and novelist, became a member of the North Monastery in 1839. He died on 12 June 1840 in his 37th year. His remains are interred in the cemetery in the grounds of the school. It was shortly after the death of Griffin that Daniel O'Connell visited with the Founder of the Order, Edmund Ignatius Rice.

In 1857, Brother James Burke arrived at the North Monastery and under his guidance the students began the study of natural philosophy (science). At this time John Philip Holland (inventor of the submarine) studied under the guidance of Br. Burke. In 1879, Patrick J. Kennedy, a past pupil, was installed as Lord Mayor of Cork, the first of a long and distinguished list of past pupils to hold this office. In 1901 the Lord Mayor of Cork, Edward Fitzgerald, organised an Industrial Exhibition.

The school represented the Department of Education and Br. Burke and his students built an electric tramway which was the high point of the exhibition. Burke died on 23 March 1904 as the result of an accident and was accorded a public funeral with a procession through the streets of Cork city. He was buried in the cemetery at the North Monastery.

In 1911, the school celebrated its centenary and the Br. Burke Memorial Extension, was formally opened in 1913. On the advent of the First World War the British army confiscated lathes, drilling machines and other machinery from the school. They closed and sealed the wireless room and cut down the aerial mast. These precautions were carried out under the Defence of the Realm Act.

In March 1920, Lord Mayor Tomás Mac Curtain, a past pupil, paid an official visit to the school and addressed the boys in Irish. Shortly afterwards he was murdered at midnight by a gang of armed assassins. He was given a public funeral at which nearly 2,000 North Monastery boys marched in procession. Terence McSwiney, who was also a past pupil, was his successor. He died in October 1920 in Brixton prison after 74 days on hunger strike.

The school continued to flourish and produced many more past pupils who distinguished themselves in all walks of life including business, politics, sport, the arts and academia, including former Taoiseach and sportsman Jack Lynch who formally opened a new secondary school building in 1967.

== Notable former pupils ==
=== Academic ===
- Tadhg Begley, Professor at Cornell and Texas A & M universities
- Patrick F. Fottrell, Professor and President at NUI Galway
- Vincent Barry, credited with the development of the compound used to cure leprosy.

=== Arts ===
- Jonathan Rhys Meyers, actor
- Edward Mulhare, actor
- Niall Tobin, actor
- Frank O'Connor, short story writer
- Joe Lynch, actor
- Donal Farmer, actor
- Rory Gallagher, blues rock guitarist
- Matt Cooper, journalist and radio presenter
- Seán Ó Ríordáin, poet
- Gavin O'Connor, actor

=== Politicians ===
- Jack Lynch, Taoiseach and Cork hurler
- Tomás Mac Curtain, Lord Mayor of Cork
- Terence McSwiney, Lord Mayor of Cork
- Donal O'Callaghan, Lord Mayor of Cork

=== Sport ===
- Johnny Clifford, hurler
- Paddy Collins, hurler
- Con Murphy, hurler
- Mick Kennefick, hurler
- John Buckley, hurler
- Dónal O'Grady, hurler
- Tomás Mulcahy, hurler and footballer
- Tony O'Sullivan, hurler and footballer
- Kieran McGuckin, hurler
- Teddy McCarthy, hurler and footballer
- Seán Óg Ó hAilpín, hurler
- Setanta Ó hAilpín, hurler
- Aisake Ó hAilpín, hurler
- Patrick Horgan, hurler
- Mark Carroll, Olympic athlete
- Ciaran Teehan, Darts
- Daire Connery, hurler

== Notable former teachers ==
- John Philip Holland, inventor of the submarine
- Dónal O'Grady, former hurler and manager
