= CBS Thurles =

Irish Catholic school

Location
- O'Donovan Rossa Street, Thurles, County Tipperary, Ireland; 52.6812°N 7.8142°W

Information
- Motto: Facere et Docere (To do and to teach)
- Religious affiliation: Roman Catholic
- Established: 1816; 210 years ago
- Principal: Tiernan O'Donnell
- Colours: Yellow and blue
- Website: Official website

CBS Thurles is a Christian Brothers all-boys post-primary school located in Thurles, County Tipperary, Ireland. The school has over 550 students and operates under the trusteeship of Edmund Rice Schools Trust (ERST).

== History ==
CBS Thurles was founded in 1816 by William and Thomas Cahill. The composite monastery and school was situated in what was then known as Pudding Lane and catered for both primary and secondary pupils. Their numbers having declined, the Christian Brothers no longer have day-to-day involvement in the administration of the school. Instead, a lay principal and board of management manage the school with the Christian Brothers remaining as trustees.

== Curriculum ==
As well as the Junior Cycle and Leaving Certificate, the school offers an optional Transition Year programme and the Leaving Certificate Vocational Programme.

== Notable alumni ==
=== Business ===
- Tony Ryan, businessman

=== Politics ===
- Michael Lowry, TD
- David Molony, TD

=== Sports ===
- James Barry, hurler
- John Joe Callanan, hurler
- Declan Carr, hurler
- Lar Corbett, hurler
- Jimmy Doyle, hurler
- John Doyle, hurler
- Jimmy Finn, hurler
- Pat Henderson, hurler
- Seán Kenny, hurler
- Jimmy Lanigan, hurler
- John Maher, hurler
- Pádraic Maher, hurler
- Mick Murphy, hurler
- P. J. Ryan, hurler
- Tom Semple, hurler
- Pat Stakelum, hurler
- Tony Wall, hurler
