= List of All-Ireland Under-20 Hurling Championship winners =

This is a list of all teams and players who have won the All-Ireland Under-20 Hurling Championship (previously the All-Ireland Under-21 Championship) since its inception in 1964.

== By team ==
No.	Team	Wins	Winning years	Ref
1	Cork	14	1966, 1968, 1969, 1970, 1971, 1973, 1976, 1982, 1988, 1997, 1998, 2020, 2021, 2023	
2	Kilkenny	12	1974, 1975, 1977, 1984, 1990, 1994, 1999, 2003, 2004, 2006, 2008, 2022	
3	Tipperary	12	1964, 1967, 1979, 1980, 1981, 1985, 1989, 1995, 2010, 2018, 2019, 2025	
4	Galway	10	1972, 1978, 1983, 1986, 1991, 1993, 1996, 2005, 2007, 2011	
5	Limerick	6	1987, 2000, 2001, 2002, 2015, 2017	
6	Clare	5	2009, 2012, 2013, 2014, 2026	
7	Waterford	2	1992, 2016	
8	Wexford	1	1965	
8	Offaly	1	2024	

== By year ==
Year	Team	Players	Ref
1964	Tipperary	P O'Sullivan, W Smith, N O'Gorman, M O'Meara, O Killoran, C Dwyer, L Gaynor, M Roche, J Fogarty, N Lane, M Keating, F Loughnane, J Dillon, TJ Butler, T Brennan. Sub: PJ Ryan.	
1965	Wexford	M. Jacob, W. O’Neill, D. Quigley, A. Somers, V. Staples, M. Kinsella, W. Murphy, E. Ryan, J. Doran, C. Dowdall, P. Quigley, S. Barron, A. Maher, T. Doran, J. Berry. Sub: C. Jacob	
1966	Cork	J. Mitchell, W. Murphy, T. Falvey, P. O'Sullivan, C. Roche, J. Russell, D. Coughlan, J. McCarthy, G. McCarthy, S. Barry, T. Browne, P. Curley, C. McCarthy, A. O'Flynn, E. O'Brien. Subs: A. Mahon, B. McKeown	
1967	Tipperary	H. Condron, S. Ryan, J. Kelly, D. Grady, M. Esmond, T. O'Connor, S. Hogan, P.J. Ryan, C. Davitt, P. Lowry, N. O'Dwyer, J. Ryan, J. Walsh, P. O'Connor, J. Flanagan. Subs: M. Nolan, T. Delaney	
1968	Cork	B. Hurley, W. Murphy, B. Tobin, F. Norberg, N. Dunne, W. Walsh, R. Cummins, D. Clifford, P. Moylan, B. Meade, S. Murphy, P. Hegarty, H. O'Sullivan, P. Curley, P. Ring. Subs: M. McCarthy, J. Murphy, R. Lehane	
1969	Cork	B. Hurley, M. McCarthy, B. Tobin, F. Norberg, S. Looney, D. Clifford, T. O'Brien, S. Murphy, P. Moylan, B. Meade, W. Walsh, N. Dunne, F. Keane, R. Cummins, B. Cummins. Sub: P. McDonnell	
1970	Cork	M. Coleman, M. McCarthy, P. McDonnell, B. Tobin, S. Murphy, J. Horgan, T. O'Brien, S. Looney, P. Moylan, C. Kelly, B. Cummins, K. McSweeney, S. O'Leary, P. Barrett, P. Ring.	
1971	Cork	M. Coleman, J. Horgan, P. McDonnell, B. Murphy, S. O'Farrell, M. O'Doherty, B. Coleman, S. Looney, N. Crowley, E. Fitzpatrick, M. Malone, K. McSweeney, B. Cummins, J. Rothwell, S. O'Leary. Subs: P. Casey, D. Collins, P. Kavanagh	
1972	Galway	E. Campbell, L. Glynn, G. Kelly, L. Shields, I. Clarke, F. Donaghue, A. Brehony, G. Glynn, F. Burke, M. Coen, A, Fenton, M. Donaghue, M. Barrett, T. O’Donaghue, G. Holland. Subs: P.J. Molloy, J. McDonagh	
1973	Cork	F. O'Sullivan, M. Corbett, L. Kelly, B. Murphy, M. O'Doherty, J. Buckley, D. Burns, T. Crowley, B. Cotter, P. Kavanagh, S. O'Farrell, T. Murphy, D. Relihan, T. Fogarty, S. O'Leary. Subs: T. Sheehan, J. Barry Murphy	
1974	Kilkenny	K. Fennelly, T. McCormack, M. Hogan, J. Dunne, G. Henderson, B. Cody, M. Tierney, J. Dowling, S. Brophy, N. Brennan, G. Woodcock, G. Fennelly, P. Kearney, A. Teehan, W. Fitzpatrick. Subs: R. Sweeney, P. Mulcahy	
1975	Kilkenny	K. Fennelly, J. Marnell, J. Moran, D. O’Hara, G. Henderson, B. Cody, J. Grace, J. Dowling, G. Fennelly, J. Hennessy, M. Tierney, J. Lyng, T. Brennan, R. Sweeney, W. Fitzpatrick. Subs: K. Robinson, J. O’Sullivan, G. Woodcock	
1976	Cork	J. Cronin, J. Crowley, W. Geaney, D. MacCurtain, J. Fenton, T. Cashman, F. Delaney, S. O'Mahony, C. Brassil, J. Allen, R. McDonnell, P. Horgan, T. Murphy, K. Murphy, D. Buckley. Sub: W. Reidy	
1977	Kilkenny	E. Mahon, J. Lennon, J. Henderson, P. Prendergast, J. Hennessy, D. O’Hara, R. Reid, P. Lannon, M. Kennedy, R. Power, M. Lyng, B. Waldron, B. Fennelly, G. Tyrrell, J. Wall. Sub: K. Brennan	
1978	Galway	G. Smith, C. Hayes, M. Headd, P.J. Burke, J. Greaney, M. Earls, S. Coen, S. Mahon, M. Kilkenny, G. Kennedy, J. Goode, P. Ryan, B. Forde, M. Conneely, J. Ryan	
1979	Tipperary	V. Mullins, P. Loughnane, J. Ryan, E. Hogan, A. Slattery, J. O'Dwyer, G. Stapleton, G. O'Connor, P. Fox, M. Murphy, E. O'Shea, T. Grogan, B. Mannion, M. Doyle, P. Looby. Sub: P. Ryan	
1980	Tipperary	V. Mullins, M. Ryan, Cormac Bonnar, P. Fox, B. Heffernan, J. O'Dwyer, P. McGrath, M. Kennedy, P. Kennedy, M. Murphy, B. Ryan, A. Buckkey, J. Kennedy, D. O'Connell, P. Power. Sub: A. Kinsella	
1981	Tipperary	J. Farrell, M. Ryan, P. Brennan, P. Fox, I. Conroy, J. McIntyre, P. McGrath, A. Kinsella, P. Kennedy, N. English, B. Ryan, M. McGrath, G. O'Neill, D. O'Connell, A. Buckley	
1982	Cork	G. Cunningham, M. McCarthy, M. Boylan, J. Hodgins, W. Cashman, K. O'Driscoll, C. O'Connor, K. Hennessy, D. Curtin, A. O'Sullivan, T. Coyne, D. Walsh, E. Brosnan, M. O'Sullivan, G. Motherway. Subs: P. Deasy, T. Mulcahy, Gabriel McCarthy	
1983	Galway	T. Coen, B. Dervan, P. Casserly, M. Donaghue, P. Finnerty, A. Keady, O. Kilkenny, A. Moylan, P. Healy, A. Staunton, M. Coleman, M. Costelloe, G. Burke, J. Murphy, M. McGrath. Subs: E. Ryan, C. Hennebry, M. Kenny	
1984	Kilkenny	D. Burke, E. Wall, E. O’Connor, B. Young, D. Hoyne, L. Cleere, L. Walsh, T. Phelan, R. Heffernan, D. Carroll, P. Walsh, J. McDonald, L. McCarthy, R. McCarthy, S. Delahunty. Subs: P. Ryan, M. Rafter	
1985	Tipperary	J. Leamy, N. McDonnell, P. O'Donoghue, Colm Bonnar, M. Corcoran, D. Kealy, P. Delaney, J. Kennedy, A. Ryan, M. Cunningham, J. McGrath, N. Sheehy, J. McCormack, L. Stokes, M. Scully. Sub: M. Bryan	
1986	Galway	J. Commins, P. Dervan, M. Kelly, M. Flaherty, M. Helebert, P. Malone, G. McInerney, T. Monaghan, D. Jennings, M. Connolly, A. Cunningham, A. Davoren, P. Nolan, J. Cooney, P. Higgins. Subs: G. Elwood, S. Keane	
1987	Limerick	V. Murnane, A. Madden, P. Carey, D. Flynn, D. Nash, A. O'Riordan, M. Reale, G. Hegarty, J. O'Neill, G. Kirby, A. Carmody, G. Ryan, P. Barrett, J. O'Connor, L. O'Connor. Sub: D. Marren	
1988	Cork	T. Kingston, C. Connery, D. Irwin, S. O'Leary, C. Casey, P. Kenneally, A. O'Keeffe, L. Kelly, T. Cooney, J. Corcoran, G. Manley, F. Horgan, D. O'Connell, M. Foley, J. Fitzgibbon	
1989	Tipperary	B. Bane, L. Sheedy, M. Ryan, G. Frend, J. Madden, Conal Bonnar, S. Maher, J. Leahy, Declan Ryan, P. Hogan, C. Stakelum, Dinny Ryan, M. Nolan, D. Quirke, T. Lanigan. Subs: J. Cahill, K. Ryan, D. Lyons	
1990	Kilkenny	J. Conroy, J. Holohan, P. O’Neill, D. Carroll, P. Brophy, T. Murphy, J. Conlon, J. Brennan, B. McGovern, A. Ronan, J. Lawlor, T. Shefflin, D.J. Carey, P. Treacy, C. Carter. Subs: P. O’Grady, J. Walton	
1991	Galway	R. Burke, C. Helebert, B. Feeney, M. Killilea, G. McGrath, P. Hardiman, N. Power, B. Keogh, N. Larkin, L. Burke, J. Campbell, T. O’Brien, B. Larkin, J. Rabbitte, C. Moran. Subs: P. Egan, M. Curtin	
1992	Waterford	R. Barry, K. O'Gorman, O. Dunphy, M. O'Sullivan, T. Browne, P. Fanning, F. Hartley, T. Fives, J. Brenner, A. Fitzgerald, M. Hubbard, Kevin McGrath, N. Dalton, S. Daly, P. Flynn. Sub: P. Power	
1993	Galway	M. Darcy, A. Headd, W. Burke, D. canning, R. Walsh, N. Shaughnessy, M. Donaghue, L. Burke, M. Kearns, F. Forde, J. McGrath, A. Kirwan, P. Kelly, D. Coleman, M. Headd. Subs: C. O’Donovan, C. O’Doherty, M. Kilkelly	
1994	Kilkenny	M. Carey, S. Meally, E. Drea, B. Power, A. O’Sullivan, E. Dwyer, P. Larkin, B. McEvoy, D. Maher, S. Dolland, P. Barry, P.J. Delaney, B. Ryan, D. Byrne, R. Shortall. Subs: O. O’Conner, D. O’Neill	
1995	Tipperary	B. Cummins, L. Barron, P. Shelly, P. Shanahan, B. Horgan, K. Slevin, B. Flannery, A. Butler, Terence Dunne, Thomas Dunne, L. McGrath, E. Enright, K. Tucker, D. O'Connor, D. Bourke. Sub: P. O'Dwyer	
1996	Galway	E. Cloonan, G. Kennedy, P. Huban, L. Hodgins, B. Higgins, C. Moore, M. Healy, G. Glynn, O. Fahy, D. Moran, V. Maher, F. Healy, A. Kerins, D. Coen, K. Broderick. Subs: M. Cullinane, D. Walsh	
1997	Cork	D. Og Cusack, J. Browne, D. O'Sullivan, W. Sherlock, D. Barrett, D. Murphy, S. Og O hAilpin, P. Ryan, A. Walsh, B. O'Driscoll, T. McCarthy, M. O'Connell, J. O'Flynn, D. Ronan, J. Deane. Subs: S. O'Farrell, B. Coleman	
1998	Cork	D. Og Cusack, M. Prendergast, D. O'Sullivan, W. Sherlock, D. Barrett, D. Murphy, S. Og O hAilpin, A. Walsh, L. Mannix, N. Ronan, T. McCarthy, M. O'Connell, B. O'Keeffe, S. O'Farrell, J. Deane. Subs: J. Anderson, B. O'Connor	
1999	Kilkenny	J. Power, A. Walpole, N. Hickey, M. Kavanagh, A. Cummins, S. Dowling, R. Mullally, J. O’Neill, J.P. Corcoran, M. Gordon, J. Coogan, K. Power, A. Geoghegan, H. Shefflin, E. Brennan. Subs: P. Delaney, J. Barron	
2000	Limerick	T. Houlihan, D. Reale, E. Mulcahy, P. Reale, P. O'Reilly, B. Geary, W. Walsh, J. Meskell, S. Lucey, P. O'Grady, S. O'Connor, D. Stapleton, D. Sheehan, B. Begley, M. Keane. Sub: K. Tobin	
2001	Limerick	T. Houlihan, D. Reale, B. Carroll, E. Mulcahy, M. O'Riordan, B. Geary, M. O'Brien, P. Lawlor, S. Lucey, E. Foley, K. Tobin, P. Tobin, C. Fitzgerald, N. Moran, M. Keane. Sub: A. O'Shaughnessy	
2002	Limerick	T. Houlihan, D. Reale, E. Mulcahy, M. Cahill, E. Foley, P. O'Dwyer, M. O'Brien, P. Lawlor, N. Moran, C. Fitzgerald, J. O'Brien, K. Tobin, A. O'Shaughnessy, P. Kirby, M. Keane. Subs: P. Tobin, B. Carroll, R. Hayes	
2003	Kilkenny	D Herity; G Joyce, C Hickey, M Phelan; K Coogan, J Tyrell, JJ Delaney; S Hennessy, T Walsh; C Phelan, P Cleere, W O'Dwyer; A Fogarty, M Rice, B Dowling. Subs: S O'Neill, E McCormack.	
2004	Kilkenny	D. Herrity; S. Maher, J. Tennyson, M. Fennelly; T. Walsh, P.J. Delaney, C. Hoyne; S. Hennessy, P. Cleere; S. O’Neill, W. O’Dwyer, E. Reid; C. Fitzpatrick, C. Phelan, R. Power. Subs: M. Rice, B. Dowling, E. Larkin, J. Phelan, N. Doherty.	
2005	Galway	A Ryan, P Flynn, A Gaynor, K Briscoe, G Mahon, B Cullinane, D Collins, B Lucas, A Garvey, J Gantley, A Callanan, E Ryan, N Healy, K Burke, K Wade. Subs - F Coone, C Dervan, D Kelly	
2006	Kilkenny	L Tierney; K Joyce, J Tennyson, S Cummins; P Hartley, J Dalton, D Fogarty; J Fitzpatrick, M Fennelly (capt); TJ Reid, A Murphy, P Hogan; R Hogan, R Power, D McCormack. Sub used: A Healy for McCormack.	
2007	Galway	D Tuohy; E Glynn, C Dillon, C O'Doherty; D O'Donovan, N O'Connell, J Gunning; E Barrett, C O'Donovan, C Morley, J Conlon, S Collins; C Tierney, D Honan, C Ryan. Subs: C McGrath, P O'Connor, E Hayes.	
2008	Kilkenny	C McGrath, P Murphy, K Joyce, E O’Shea, L Ryan, P Hogan, N Prendergast, J Dowling, N Walsh, C Fennelly, J Mulhall, TJ Reid, M Ruth, N Cleere, R Hogan. Subs: JJ Farrell, J Maher, M Bergin	
2009	Clare	D Tuohy; E Glynn, C Dillon, C O'Doherty; D O'Donovan, N O'Connell, J Gunning; E Barrett, C O'Donovan, C Morley, J Conlon, S Collins; C Tierney, D Honan, C Ryan. Subs: C McGrath, P O'Connor, E Hayes.	
2010	Tipperary	J Logue; K O'Gorman, Pádraic Maher, M Cahill; J Barry, B Maher, C Hough; S Hennessy, N McGrath; S Carey, Patrick Maher, B O'Meara; M Heffernan, P Murphy, J O'Dwyer. Subs: C Coughlan, J O'Neill, A Ryan, J Gallagher, K Morris.	
2011	Galway	J Ryan; D Connolly, N Donoghue, G O'Halloran; J Grealish, P Gordan, R Foy; J Coen, D Burke; C Cooney, N Burke, T Haran; J Regan, B Daly, D Glennon. Subs: R Burke, B Burke, D Fox, N Quinn, D Cooney	
2012	Clare	R Taaffe, P Flanagan, D McInerney, K Ryan, P O'Connor, C Ryan, S Morey, C Galvin, S Golden, T Kelly, P Collins, A Cunningham, C McInerney, C McGrath, C O'Connell. Subs: P Duggan, N Arthur.	
2013	Clare	R Taaffe; P Flanagan, D McInerney, J Browne; S Morey, A O’Neill, S O’Halloran; C Galvin, T Kelly; P Duggan, P Collins, C Malone; C O’Connell, S O’Donnell, D O’Halloran. Subs: J Colleran, K Lynch, E Boyce, N Arthur, A Cunningham.	
2014	Clare	K Hogan; J Colleran, J Browne, S Morey; G O’Connell, C Cleary, J Shanahan; C Galvin, E Enright; B Duggan, T Kelly, P Duggan; S O’Donnell, A Cunningham, D Reidy. Subs: C O’Connell, A O’Neill, S O'Brien.	
2015	Limerick	D McCarthy; S Finn, R English, M Casey; D Byrnes (c), B O'Connell, G Hegarty; D O'Donovan, P Ryan; B Nash, T Morrissey, D Dempsey; C Lynch, C Ryan, R Lynch. Subs: P Casey 0-3, A La Touche-Cosgrave, J Kelliher, M O'Callaghan, J Hannon.	
2016	Waterford	J Henley; W Hahessy, C Gleeson, D Lyons; M Harney, A Gleeson, C Prunty; M O'Brien, Shane Bennett; C Roche, T Devine, DJ Foran; P Curran (jc), Stephen Bennett, M Kearney. Subs: A Farrell (jc), D Ryan, B O'Keeffe, P Hogan, B Whelan.	
2017	Limerick	E McNamara; S Finn, D Fanning, D Joy; R Lynch, K Hayes, T Grimes; C Ryan, R Hanley; A Gillane, B Murphy, C Lynch; P Casey, T Morrissey (c), B Nash. Subs: C Boylan, A La Touche Cosgrave, O O'Reilly, L Lyons.	
2018	Tipperary	B Hogan; E Connolly, B McGrath, K O'Dwyer; P Campion, R Byrne, D Quirke; S Nolan, G Browne; C English (c), J Cahill, P Feehan; J Morris, M Kehoe, C Darcy. Subs: C Stakelum, D Gleeson, C Morgan, P Cadell, L Fairbrother.	
2019	Tipperary	A Browne; C McCarthy, E Connolly, C Morgan (c); N Heffernan, P Cadell, B O'Mara; C Connolly, J Cahill; G O'Connor, J Morris, J Ryan; A Ormond, B Seymour, C Bowe. Subs: S Hayes, K O'Kelly, J Fogarty, C Bourke, M Purcell.	
2020	Cork	E Davis; C O’Callaghan (c), E Roche, A Walsh Barry; D Connery, C Joyce, D O’Leary; D. Flynn, T O'Connell; B Roche, S Barrett, S Twomey; P Power, A Connolly, Colin O'Brien. Subs: J Cahalane, E Carey, B Hayes, S O’Regan, Cormac O’Brien.	
2021	Cork	C Wilson; E Downey, E Twomey, C O’Brien (c); K Moynihan, C Joyce, B O’Sullivan; S Quirke, D Kearney; D Flynn, D Hogan, B Hayes; R Cotter, P Power, J Cahalane. Subs: B Cunningham, L Horgan, M Mullins, C O’Donovan, C McCarthy.	
2022	Kilkenny	A Tallis; N Rowe, S Purcell, P Lennon; J Fitzpatrick, P Moylan (c), P Langton; K Doyle, A Hickey; P McDonald, T Clifford, D Walsh; B Drennan, G Dunne, I Byrne. Subs: J Walsh, E O’Brien, J Doyle.	
