= List of Cork Senior A Hurling Championship winners =

This is a list of all teams and players who have won the Cork Senior A Hurling Championship since its inception in 2020.

== By team ==
#	Team	Wins	Winning Years
1	Charleville	1	2020
1	Kanturk	1	2021
1	Fr O'Neill's	1	2022
1	Newcestown	1	2023
1	Glen Rovers	1	2024

== By year ==
List of Cork Senior A Hurling Championship winners
Year	Team	Players	Ref
2020	Charleville	C Collins; D Butler, J Meade, M O'Flynn; A Dennehy (c), J Buckley, F Cagney; D O'Flynn, J O'Callaghan; D Fitzgibbon, G Kelleher, J Doyle; D Casey, M Kavanagh, A Cagney. Sub: C Carroll, J O'Brien, J Barry, T Hawe, C Buckley.	
2021	Kanturk	G Bucinkas; J McLoughlin, R Walsh, L Cashman; J Browne, D Browne (c), L O'Neill; L McLoughlin, A Sheehy; B O'Sullivan, Aidan Walsh, C Walsh; L O'Keeffe, Alan Walsh, I Walsh. Subs: D O'Connell, C Clernon, M Healy.	
2022	Fr O'Neill's	P O’Sullivan; M Millerick, G Millerick, S O’Connor; M O’Keeffe, D Harrington, R Kenneally; T Millerick, K O’Sullivan; J Hankard, D Dalton, Joe Millerick; John Millerick, C Broderick, B Dunne. Subs: E Motherway, P McMahon, J Barry, P Hassett.	
2023	Newcestown	C Wilson; J Kelleher, M McSweeney, G O’Donovan; C O’Neill, L Meade, E Collins; T Twomey, N Kelly; S O’Donovan, J Meade, D Buckley; E Kenneally, C Dinneen, R O’Sullivan. Subs: T Horgan; S O’Sullivan; F Keane, C O’Donovan.	
2024	Glen Rovers	C Hickey; A Lynch, E Downey, S McDonnell; B Moylan, R Downey, D Dooling; L Coughlan, R Dunne; S Kennefick, D Brosnan (c), M Dooley; S Lynam, P Horgan, E O’Leary. Subs: L Horgan, L Quilligan, D Noonan.	
