= Brian Hayes (dual player) =

Irish Gaelic footballer and hurler

Personal information
- Native name: Brian Ó hAodha (Irish)
- Born: 2001 (age 24–25) Cork, Ireland
- Occupation: Operations analyst
- Height: 6 ft 4 in (193 cm)

Sport
- Sport: Hurling
- Position: Corner Forward (Hurling), Midfield (Football)
Clubs*
Years	Club	Apps (scores)
2019– 2019–	St Finbarr's; St Finbarr's	25 (10–42); 35 (12–44)
Club titles
	Football	Hurling
Cork titles	2	1
Munster titles	1	0
College
- Years: College
- 2020-2024: University College Cork
College titles
- Fitzgibbon titles: 0
Inter-county**
Years	County	Apps (scores)
2021–2022 2022–	Cork (SF); Cork (SH)	3 (0–00); 25 (13-42)
Inter-county titles
- Munster titles: 1
- All-Irelands: 0
- NHL: 1
- All Stars: 2
- * club appearances and scores correct as of 21:22, 31 January 2026. **Inter County team apps and scores correct as of 20:42, 5 July 2026.

Brian Hayes (born 2001) is an Irish Gaelic footballer and hurler who plays for club side St Finbarr's and at senior level with the Cork county hurling team. He usually lines out as a forward.

== Early life ==
Born and raised in Cork, Hayes played hurling and Gaelic football to a high standard as a student at Presentation Brothers College (PBC). He was captain of the PBC senior football team in 2019. Hayes later studied at University College Cork and was part of their Fitzgibbon Cup panel.

== Club career ==
Hayes began his club career at juvenile and underage levels as a dual player with the St Finbarr's club, before progressing to adult level in 2019. It was as a Gaelic footballer that he claimed his first silverware when, in 2021, he won a Cork PSFC medal as midfield partner to Ian Maguire after a one-point defeat of Clonakilty in the final. This was followed by a Munster Club SFC medal after a 2–09 to 1–10 defeat of Austin Stacks. Hayes was the St Finbarr's team's top scorer from play when they won the Cork PSHC title in October 2022 after a 2–14 to 1–07 defeat of Blackrock.

== Inter-county career ==
Hayes never played for Cork at minor level but lined out as a dual player with the respective under-20 teams. He claimed his first All-Ireland U20HC medal in August 2021 after coming on as a substitute in the four-point win over Dublin in COVID-19-delayed 2020 All-Ireland U20 final. Hayes collected a second winners' medal when Cork retained the title after scoring 1-02 from play in the 4–19 to 2–14 defeat of Galway in the 2021 All-Ireland U20 final. As a member of the under-20 football team, Hayes won a Munster U20FC medal after captaining Cork to a ten-point win over Tipperary in 2021.

Hayes was drafted onto the Cork senior football team for the 2022 season and made a number of appearances for the team, including the All-Ireland quarter-final loss to Dublin. He joined the Cork senior hurling team in December 2022.

Hayes lined out at left corner-forward for Cork's 3–29 to 1–34 extra-time defeat by Clare in the 2024 All-Ireland final. He ended the season by being names on the Sunday Game Team of the Year. Hayes claimed his first senior silverware in April 2025 when Cork won the National Hurling League title following a 3–24 to 0–23 win over Tipperary in the final. This was later followed by a Munster SHC medal after Cork's penalty shootout defeat of Limerick in the 2025 Munster final.

== Personal life ==
Hayes's father, Paddy Hayes, was a member of the Cork senior football team that won the All-Ireland SFC title in 1990. His uncle, Ger Cunningham, won All-Ireland SHC titles with Cork in 1984, 1986 and 1990. His cousin, Ben Cunningham, has also lined out with the Cork senior team.

== Career statistics ==
=== Club ===
As of 10 October 2026.

Team	Year	Cork PSHC		Munster		All-Ireland		Total		Cork PSFC		Munster		All-Ireland		Total	
Team	Year	Apps	Score	Apps	Score	Apps	Score	Apps	Score	Apps	Score	Apps	Score	Apps	Score	Apps	Score
St Finbarr's	2019	1	0–0	—		—		1	0–0	2	0–0	—		—		2	0–0
St Finbarr's	2020	3	0–9	—		—		3	0–9	5	0–8	—		—		5	0–8
St Finbarr's	2021	3	1–6	—		—		3	1–6	6	0–6	1	0–3	1	0–0	8	0–9
St Finbarr's	2022	6	4–16	1	0–2	—		7	4–18	5	4–9	—		—		5	4–9
St Finbarr's	2023	5	2–3	—		—		5	2–3	4	1–5	—		—		4	1–5
St Finbarr's	2024	3	1–3	—		—		3	1–3	5	2–4	—		—		5	2–4
St Finbarr's	2025	3	2–3	—		—		3	2–3	4	2–5	3	3–6	—		7	5–11
St Finbarr's	2026	4	0–10	—		—		4	0–10	5	2–11	—		—		5	2–11
Career total		28	10–50	1	0–2	—		29	10–52	36	11–48	4	3–9	1	0–0	41	14–57

=== Inter-county ===
As of 4 July 2026

Team	Year	National League			Munster		All-Ireland		Total	
Team	Year	Division	Apps	Score	Apps	Score	Apps	Score	Apps	Score
Cork	2023	Division 1A	6	0–06	3	1–00	—		9	1–06
Cork	2024	Division 1A	4	1–06	4	0–05	4	2–08	12	3–19
Cork	2025	Division 1A	7	5–08	5	3–07	2	2–02	14	10–17
Cork	2026	Division 1A	6	6–09	5	2–13	2	3–07	13	11–29
Career total			23	12–29	17	6–25	8	7–17	48	25–71

== Honours ==
St Finbarr's

- Munster Senior Club Football Championship: 2021
- Cork Premier Senior Hurling Championship: 2022
- Cork Premier Senior Football Championship: 2021, 2025

Cork

- Munster Senior Hurling Championship: 2025
- National Hurling League: 2025
- All-Ireland Under-20 Hurling Championship: 2020, 2021
- Munster Under-20 Hurling Championship: 2020, 2021
- Munster Under-20 Football Championship: 2021 (c)

Awards

- The Sunday Game Team of the Year: 2024, 2025
- All Star Award (2): 2025, 2026

Sporting positions
Preceded by Mark Cronin; Blake Murphy	Cork under-20 football team captain 2022	Succeeded by Jacob O'Driscoll
