= List of Cork Senior A Hurling Championship runners-up =

This is a list of all teams and players who have won the Cork Senior A Hurling Championship since its inception in 2020.

== By team ==
#	Team	Losses	Losing Years
1	Fr O'Neill's	2	2020, 2021
1	Blarney	2	2023, 2024
3	Courcey Rovers	1	2022

== By year ==
List of Cork Senior A Hurling Championship runners-up
Year	Team	Players	Ref
2020	Fr O'Neill's	C Sloane; M Millerick (jc), S O'Connor, E Motherway; J Barry, M O'Keeffe, T Millerick; K O'Sullivan, John Millerick; R Cullinane, P McMahon (jc), J Hankard; L O'Driscoll, D Dalton, B Dunne. Subs: P Butler, E Conway, Joe Millerick.	
2021	Fr O'Neill's	C Sloane; M Millerick, S O'Connor, E Motherway; Joe Millerick, M O'Keeffe, T Millerick (c); D Harrington, John Millerick; R Cullinane, P McMahon, K O'Sullivan; C Broderick, J Hankard, B Dunne. Subs: G Millerick, R Kenneally.	
2022	Courcey Rovers	S Nyhan; B Mulcahy, M Collins, C Daly; S McCarthy, F Lordan, C Roche; DJ Twomey. L Collins; B Ryan, T O’Sullivan, O Crowley; R Nyhan, S Twomey, R Sweetnam. Subs: B Collins, J O’Neill, J McCarthy, D O’Donovan.	
2023	Blarney	C Murphy; P O’Leary, D Murphy, S Crowley; J O’Keeffe, P Crowley, C Power; O Hegarty, C Hegarty; S Mulcahy, M Coleman, C Barrett; S Barrett, P Power, C Dunlea. Subs: C McCarthy; E Kirby.	
2024	Blarney	P Halllisey; A McEvoy, C Power, S Crowley; D Hanlon, P Crowley, M Coleman (c); O Hegarty, C Hegarty; D McSweeney, S Barrett, E Kirby; C Barrett, P Power, C McCarthy. Subs: S Mulcahy, C Dunlea, D Murphy, J O’Keeffe.	
