= Greg Thomas (hurler) =

Irish hurler

Personal information
- Native name: Gréagóir Mac Tomáis (Irish)
- Born: 26 February 2003 (age 23) Castlegar, County Galway, Ireland
- Occupation: Student

Sport
- Sport: Hurling
- Position: Right corner-forward
Club
- Years: Club
- Castlegar
Club titles
- Galway titles: 0
Inter-county*
Years	County	Apps (scores)
2022-	Galway	0 (0-00)
Inter-county titles
- Connacht titles: 0
- All-Irelands: 0
- NHL: 0
- All Stars: 0
- *Inter County team apps and scores correct as of 22:44, 16 February 2022.

Greg Thomas (born 26 February 2003) is an Irish hurler who plays for Galway Senior Championship club Castlegar and at inter-county level with the Galway senior hurling team. He usually lines out as a forward.

== Career ==
Thomas first came to prominence at juvenile and underage levels with Castlegar before eventually joining the club's senior team. He first appeared on the inter-county scene as a member of the Galway minor hurling team that won consecutive All-Ireland Minor Championship titles in 2019 and 2020. Thomas immediately progressed onto the Galway under-20 hurling team and was at right wing-forward on the team beaten by Cork in the 2021 All-Ireland under-20 final. He was drafted onto the Galway senior hurling team by new manager Henry Shefflin for the 2022 Walsh Cup.

== Honours ==
Galway

- Leinster Under-20 Hurling Championship: 2021
- All-Ireland Minor Hurling Championship: 2019, 2020
