= Andrew La Touche Cosgrave =

Irish hurler (born 1996)

Personal information
- Native name: Aindriú La Touche Ó Coscraigh (Irish)
- Born: 1996 (age 29–30) Limerick, Ireland
- Occupation: Student
- Height: 6 ft 1 in (185 cm)

Sport
- Sport: Hurling
- Position: Centre-back
Club
- Years: Club
- 2013-present: Monaleen
Club titles
- Limerick titles: 0
College
- Years: College
- 2015-present: Limerick Institute of Technology
College titles
- Fitzgibbon titles: 0
Inter-county*
Years	County	Apps (scores)
2017-present	Limerick	0 (0-00)
Inter-county titles
- Munster titles: 0
- All-Irelands: 1
- NHL: 0
- All Stars: 0
- *Inter County team apps and scores correct as of 18:31, 22 August 2018.

Andrew La Touche Cosgrave (born 1996) is an Irish hurler who plays as a centre-back for club side Monaleen and at inter-county level with the Limerick senior hurling team.

== Playing career ==
=== College ===
La Touche Cosgrave first came to prominence as a hurler with Castletroy College in Limerick. Having played in every grade, he was at left wing-back on the college's senior team that contested the Harty Cup.

=== University ===
During his studies at the Limerick Institute of Technology, La Touche Cosgrave was selected for the college's senior hurling team for the Fitzgibbon Cup.

=== Club ===
La Touche Cosgrave joined the Monaleen club at a young age and played in all grades at juvenile and underage levels before joining the club's top adult team. On 9 October 2016, he won a Premier Intermediate Championship medal following a 1–17 to 2–11 defeat of Cappamore in the final.

=== Inter-county ===
==== Minor and under-21 ====
La Touche Cosgrave first played for the Limerick minor hurling team at the age of fifteen. On 23 July 2013, he was at centre-back when Limerick won their first Munster Championship title in 29 years after a 1–20 to 4–08 defeat of Waterford in a replay of the final.

La Touche Cosgrave was eligible for the minor grade again the following year and won a second successive Munster Championship medal after a 0–24 to 0-18 second successive defeat of Waterford in a replay of the final. On 7 September 2014, La Touche Cosgrave was at centre-back for Limerick's 2–17 to 0–19 defeat by Kilkenny in the All-Ireland final.

La Touche Cosgrave subsequently joined the Limerick under-21 hurling team and won a Munster Championship medal in his first season after a 0–22 to 0–19 win over Clare in the final. On 12 September 2015, La Touche Cosgrave was introduced as a substitute for Pat Ryan when Limerick defeated Wexford by 0–26 to 1–07 in the All-Ireland final.

After surrendering their titles in 2016, La Touche Cosgrave won a second Munster Championship medal after a 0–16 to 1–11 defeat of Cork in the 2017 final. On 9 September 2017, he came on as a substitute for Tom Morrissey in Limerick's 0–17 to 0–11 defeat of Kilkenny in the All-Ireland final.

==== Under-25 ====
In 2017, La Touche Cosgrave joined the Limerick under-25 hurling team. On 18 June 2017, he was at centre-back when Limerick defeated Waterford by 4–12 to 1–19 to win the Munster Championship.

==== Senior ====
La Touche Cosgrave first played for the Limerick senior team in the pre-season Munster League against Clare on 18 January 2017. He later made his first appearance in the National Hurling League, scoring a point in a 6–21 to 3–08 defeat of Kerry. La Touche Cosgrave was later dropped from the panel prior to the start of the championship.

La Touch Cosgrave rejoined the Limerick senior panel in 2018. On 19 August 2018, he was a member of the extended panel when Limerick won their first All-Ireland title in 45 years after a 3–16 to 2–18 defeat of Galway in the final.

== Career statistics ==
As of match played 31 March 2019.

Team	Year	National League			Munster		All-Ireland		Total	
Team	Year	Division	Apps	Score	Apps	Score	Apps	Score	Apps	Score
Limerick	2017	Division 1B	2	1-02	—		—		2	1-02
Limerick	2018	Division 1B	2	0-00	0	0-00	0	0-00	2	0-00
Limerick	2019	Division 1A	1	0-00	0	0-00	0	0-00	1	0-00
Total			5	1-02	0	0-00	0	0-00	5	1-02

== Honours ==
Monaleen

- Limerick Premier Intermediate Hurling Championship (2): 2016, 2022
- Munster Intermediate Club Hurling Championship (1): 2022
- All-Ireland Intermediate Club Hurling Championship (1): 2023

Limerick

- All-Ireland Senior Hurling Championship (1): 2018
- Munster Under-25 Reserve Hurling Competition (1): 2017
- All-Ireland Under-21 Hurling Championship (2): 2015, 2017
- Munster Under-21 Hurling Championship (2): 2015, 2017
- Munster Minor Hurling Championship (1): 2014
