= Lorcan Lyons =

Irish hurler (born 1996)

Personal information
- Native name: Lorcán Ó Laighin (Irish)
- Born: 1996 (age 29–30) Monaleen, County Limerick, Ireland

Sport
- Sport: Hurling
- Position: Left corner-forward
Club
- Years: Club
- Monaleen
Club titles
- Limerick titles: 0
College
- Years: College
- University of Limerick
College titles
- Fitzgibbon titles: 0
Inter-county*
Years	County	Apps (scores)
2017-2019	Limerick	0 (0-00)
Inter-county titles
- Munster titles: 0
- All-Irelands: 1
- NHL: 1
- All Stars: 0
- *Inter County team apps and scores correct as of 20:23, 2 May 2019.

Lorcan Lyons (born 1996) who plays for Limerick Senior Championship club Monaleen. He usually lines out as a left corner-forward. Lyons is a former member of the Limerick senior hurling team.

== Playing career ==
=== Castletroy College ===
Lyons first came to prominence as a hurler with Castletroy College in Limerick. Having played in every grade, he was at midfield on the college's senior team that contested the Harty Cup.

=== Limerick Institute of Technology ===
During his studies at the Limerick Institute of Technology, La Touche Cosgrave was selected for the college's senior hurling team for the Fitzgibbon Cup.

=== Monaleen ===
Lyons joined the Monaleen club at a young age and played in all grades at juvenile and underage levels before joining the club's top adult team. On 9 October 2016, he won a Premier Intermediate Championship medal following a 1–17 to 2–11 defeat of Cappamore in the final.

=== Limerick ===
==== Minor and under-21 ====
Lyons first played for the Limerick minor hurling team at the age of seventeen. On 23 July 2013, he came on as a substitute in the 53rd minute when Limerick won their first Munster Championship title in 29 years after a 1–20 to 4–08 defeat of Waterford in a replay of the final.

Lyons was eligible for the minor grade again the following year and won a second successive Munster Championship medal after a 0–24 to 0-18 second successive defeat of Waterford in a replay of the final. On 7 September 2014, Lyons was at left corner-back for Limerick's 2–17 to 0–19 defeat by Kilkenny in the All-Ireland final.

Lyons subsequently joined the Limerick under-21 hurling team and won a Munster Championship medal in 2017 after a 0–16 to 1–11 defeat of Cork in the final. On 9 September 2017, Lyons came on as a substitute for Barry Nash in Limerick's 0–17 to 0–11 defeat of Kilkenny in the All-Ireland final.

==== Under-25 ====
In 2017, Lyons joined the Limerick under-25 hurling team. On 18 June 2017, he scored a point when Limerick defeated Waterford by 4–12 to 1–19 to win the Munster Championship.

==== Senior ====
Lyons was added to the Limerick senior hurling panel for the early stages of the 2017 season, however, he failed to retain his place for the championship.

Lyons rejoined the Limerick senior panel in 2018, making his debut as a substitute for Aaron Gillane in a 1–24 to 0–10 defeat of Offaly in the National Hurling League. On 19 August 2018, he was a member of the extended panel when Limerick won their first All-Ireland title in 45 years after a 3–16 to 2–18 defeat of Galway in the final.

Lyons was a member of Limerick's extended panel once again during the 2019 National League, however, he made no appearance during Limerick's eight-game run to the title. He was dropped from the panel prior to the start of the Munster Championship.

== Career statistics ==
As of match played 16 March 2024.

Team	Year	National League			Munster		All-Ireland		Total	
Team	Year	Division	Apps	Score	Apps	Score	Apps	Score	Apps	Score
Limerick	2017	Division 1B	0	0-00	—		—		0	0-00
Limerick	2018	Division 1B	1	0-00	0	0-00	0	0-00	1	0-00
Limerick	2019	Division 1A	0	0-00	—		—		0	0-00
	2020	Division 1A	0	0-00	—		—		0	0-00
	2021	Division 1A	0	0-00	—		—		0	0-00
	2022	Division 1A	0	0-00	—		—		0	0-00
	2023	Division 1A	0	0-00	—		—		0	0-00
	2024	Division 1A	1	0-00	0	0-00	0	0-00	1	0-00
Total			2	0-00	0	0-00	0	0-00	2	0-00

== Honours ==
Monaleen

- Limerick Premier Intermediate Hurling Championship (2): 2016, 2022 (c)
- Munster Intermediate Club Hurling Championship (1): 2022 (c)
- All-Ireland Intermediate Club Hurling Championship (1): 2023 (c)

Limerick

- All-Ireland Senior Hurling Championship (1): 2018
- National Hurling League (1): 2019
- All-Ireland Under-21 Hurling Championship (1): 2017
- Munster Under-25 Reserve Hurling Competition (1): 2017
- Munster Under-21 Hurling Championship (1): 2017
- Munster Minor Hurling Championship (2): 2013, 2014

Achievements
Preceded by Brian Byrne	All-Ireland Club IHC final winning captain 2023	Succeeded by Stephen Donnelly
