= 2019 All-Ireland Minor Hurling Championship =

All-Ireland Minor Hurling Championship 2019
Championship Details
- Dates: 27 April 2019 – 18 August 2019
- Teams: 17

All Ireland Champions
- Winners: Galway (13th win)
- Captain: Ian McGlynn
- Manager: Brian Hanley

All Ireland Runners-up
- Runners-up: Kilkenny
- Captain: James Aylward
- Manager: Richie Mulrooney

Provincial Champions
- Munster: Limerick
- Leinster: Wexford
- Ulster: Not Played
- Connacht: Not Played

Championship Statistics
- Matches Played: 42
- Total Goals: 137 (3.26 per game)
- Total Points: 1310 (31.19 per game)
- Top Scorer: Billy Drennan (2-60)

The 2019 All-Ireland Minor Hurling Championship was the 89th staging of the All-Ireland Minor Hurling Championship since its establishment by the Gaelic Athletic Association in 1928. The championship began on 27 April 2019 and ended on 18 August 2019.

Galway were the defending champions.

On 18 August 2019, Galway won the championship after a 3–14 to 0–12 defeat of Kilkenny in the All-Ireland final. This was their 13th title overall and their third title in succession.

== Competition format ==
The championship begins on a provincial basis in only two of the four provinces – Munster and Leinster. There is no Ulster Championship as Ulster teams participate in the Leinster Championship. Galway are the sole Connacht representatives and enter the competition at the All-Ireland quarter-final group stage with the beaten Leinster and Munster finalists. This ensures that Galway have at least two championship games.

== Leinster Minor Hurling Championship ==
=== Leinster Group Stage ===
==== Tier 1 ====
===== Tier 1 Table =====
Pos	Team	Pld	W	D	L	SF	SA	Diff	Pts
1	Kilkenny	3	3	0	0	8-57	5-32	+34	6
2	Dublin	3	1	1	1	6-45	3-42	+12	3
3	Wexford	3	1	1	1	7-43	8-38	+2	3
4	Offaly	3	0	0	3	4-30	9-63	-48	0

===== Tier 1 results =====
27 April 2019 Round 1	Kilkenny	0-15 - 2-08	Dublin	Nowlan Park, Kilkenny
	B Drennan 0-11 (8fs, 1 '65'); L Moore 0-2; P McDonald, A Hickey 0-1 each.	Report	B McSweeney 1-2 (0-1 '65', 0-1 f); L Swan 1-0; C Keher (1f), B Scanlon 0-2 each; C Murray, D Kenny 0-1 each.

27 April 2019 Round 1	Offaly	2-11 - 3-11	Wexford	Bord na Móna O'Connor Park, Tullamore
	J Screeney (0-8 frees), N Lyons (1-1), D Murray (1-0), L Egan (0-1), S Burke (0-1).	Report	AJ Redmond (1-3, 0-3 frees), L Kavanagh (1-2), C Byrne (1-1), C Foley (0-2); D O'Neill (0-1), J Sheil (0-1), C Molloy (0-1).	Referee: B Nea (Westmeath)

4 May 2019 Round 2	Dublin	1-23 - 1-10	Offaly	Parnell Park, Dublin
	C Keher 0-8 (0-8f), B McSweeney 0-7 (0-4f), D Purcell 0-5, L Swan 1-0, B Scanlon 0-2, C O Tuathaill 0-1.	Report	J Screeney 0-4 (0-4f), D Murray 1-1, J Ryan, L Egan, C Mitchell, L Wyer, L Nolan 0-1 each.	Referee: B Redmond (Wexford).

4 May 2019 Round 2	Wexford	2-15 - 3-13	Kilkenny	Bellefield GAA Complex, Enniscorthy
	AJ Redmond (0-7); R Lawlor (1-2); C Molloy (1-1); C Byrne (0-2); L Kavanagh, C Foley, D O’Neill (0-1 each).	Report	B Drennan (1-8); J Doyle (1-1); T Clifford (1-0); P McDonald, L Moore, A Tallis, C O’Sullivan (0-1 each).

11 May 2019 Round 3	Kilkenny	5-29 - 1-09	Offaly	Nowlan Park, Kilkenny
	L Moore 1-7, T Clifford 2-2, B Drennan 0-4 (3f), I Byrne 0-4, S Doyle 1-1, J Doyle 1-0, D Walsh 0-3, A Hickey, Z Bay Hammon, A Tallis 0-2 each, J Aylward, P Blanchfield 0-1 each.	Report	L Nolan 0-5 (3f), D Murray 1-0, C Mitchell 0-3, David Tooher 0-1 (f).

11 May 2019 Round 3	Wexford	2-17 - 3-14	Dublin	Bellefield GAA Complex, Enniscorthy
	AJ Redmond 0-11, (9f); J Sheil 1-1; D Cantwell 1-0; C Byrne 0-2; C Foley, C Molloy (f), D O’Neill 0-1 each.	Report	B McSweeney, 1-4, (3f), C Keher 1-3 (1f), B Scanlon 1-1, D Purcell 0-4; J O’Brien, C Murray 0-1 each.	Referee: G Quilty (Kilkenny)

==== Tier 2 ====
===== Tier 2 Table =====
Pos	Team	Pld	W	D	L	SF	SA	Diff	Pts
1	Laois	3	3	0	0	9-55	3-31	+42	6
2	Kildare	3	2	0	1	5-48	3-31	+23	4
3	Antrim	3	1	0	2	3-44	10-47	-24	2
4	Westmeath	3	0	0	3	4-25	5-63	-41	0

===== Tier 2 results =====
27 April 2019 Round 1	Antrim	0-07 - 2-19	Kildare	Abbotstown
	S McAuley 0-4 (3fs); R McMullen 0-2fs; C McDonnell 0-1.	Report	D Qualter 1-5 (0-4fs); D Melville 0-5; F O'Sullivan 0-4; R Stapleton 1-0; C McCabe 0-2; J Higgins, C Boran, C O'Donovan 0-1 each.

27 April 2019 Round 1	Laois	2-21 - 0-07	Westmeath	O'Moore Park, Portlaoise
	A Kirwan 0-6 (0-4 frees), D Delaney 1-2, C O’Shaughnessy 1-0, D Dooley, T Keyes and J Duggan 0-3 each, DJ Callaghan and T Cuddy 0-2 each.	Report	S Williams 0-3 (frees), C Murphy 0-3 frees), D Hill 0-1.

4 May 2019 Round 2	Antrim	2-23 - 2-08	Westmeath	Abbotstown
	R McMullan 0-7, S McAuley 0-5, F McQuillan 1-1, D Murphy 0-4 (3f), C Duffin 1-0, F McKernan 0-3, P Gilligan, E McGarry (f), P Murray 0-1 each.	Report	S Williams 0-7 (5f), B Farrell 1-1, C Murphy 1-0.	Referee: K Brady (Louth)

4 May 2019 Round 2	Kildare	2-10 -1-14	Laois	St. Conleth's Park, Newbridge
	D Qualter (2-4, 0-3fs), J Higgins (0-2), C McCabe (0-2, 0-1f); D Melville (0-1), A Hackett (0-1f).	Report	A Kirwan (1-5, 0-5fs), D Delaney (0-3fs); C O’Shaughnessy (0-2), DJ O’Callaghan (0-2), T Keyes (0-2), C Conroy (0-1).	Referee: J Deehan (Offaly)

11 May 2019 Round 3	Antrim	1-14 - 6-20	Laois	Lawless Memorial Park, Swords
		Report	A Kirwan 1-4, D Dooley, P Rafter and D Delaney 1-3 each, C O’Shaughnessy 1-1, DJ Callaghan 1-0, N Quinlan and T Cuddy 0-2 each, T Keyes and F Mahoney 0-1 each.

11 May 2019 Round 3	Westmeath	2-10 - 1-19	Kildare	TEG Cusack Park, Mullingar
	S Williams 1-10 (0-7fs), L Murtagh 1-0.	Report	D Melville 1-5, C McCabe (3fs), D Qualter 0-5 each, C Boran 0-2, R Stapleton, A Hackett (f) 0-1 each.

==== Tier 3 ====
===== Tier 3 Table =====
Pos	Team	Pld	W	D	L	SF	SA	Diff	Pts
1	Carlow	2	2	0	0	9-38	1-08	+54	4
2	Meath	2	1	0	1	3-31	5-24	+1	2
3	Down	2	0	0	2	2-11	8-48	-55	0

===== Tier 3 results =====
27 April 2019 Round 1	Carlow	3-18 - 1-03	Meath	IT Carlow Grounds, Carlow
	C Kehoe (0-11, 0-5 frees), L Brennan (1-1); F O’Toole (1-0), S Treacy (1-0), P Kavanagh (0-2), F Fitzpatrick (0-1); N Bolger (0-1); E Whelan (0-1), J Wall (0-1).	Report	M Keogh (1-0), C McGovern (0-2, 0-1 free), J Murray (0-1).	Referee: C Daly (Carlow)

4 May 2019 Round 2	Down	2-06 - 2-28	Meath	Abbotstown

11 May 2019 Round 3	Down	0-05 - 6-20	Carlow	Lawless Memorial Park, Swords
	F Codwell 0-2(2f), C Lavery (‘65), T McGrattan, C Savage 0-1 each.	Report	B Bolger 2-3, C Kehoe 0-7 (6f), S Tracey 1-3, J Doyle 2-0, T Doran 1-0, L Brennan 0-2, J McCullough, E Kealy, F O’Toole J Wall, N Bolger 0-1 each.

=== Round 1 ===
18 May 2019 Round 1	Kildare	7-35 - 0-05	Down	Abbottstown
	D Qualter 2-3 (2f); D Melville 1-6 (1f); J Higgins 0-8; C O'Donovan 1-4; R Stapleton 1-2; D McMahon 0-5 (1f); E McConnon 1-1; M Whelan 1-0; A Mooney 0-3; C McCabe 0-2; F O'Sullivan 0-1.	Report	R O'Neill 0-4 (3f); I Hussain 0-1.

18 May 2019 Round 1	Antrim	2-12 - 3-17	Meath	Conneff Park, Clane
	D Murphy 2-5 (1-0 pen, 3f), S McAuley 0-3, P Gilligan 0-2, F McKernan, F McQuillan 0-1 each.	Report	C McGovern 1-5 (4f, 1 '65), C McKeown 2-2, J Murray 0-6 (2f), J Lanigan 0-3, R Byas 0-1.

19 May 2019 Round 1	Carlow	0-18 - 2-13	Westmeath	Netwatch Cullen Park, Carlow
	C Kehoe 0-9 (6f, 1 '65); T Doran 0-3; F O'Toole 0-2; J Wall, J McCullagh, L Brennan, M Sherratt 0-1 each.	Report	S Williams 0-8 (5f); A Hill 1-1; P Weir Norris 1-0; C Murphy 0-2; M Glynn, E Scally 0-1 each.

=== Round 2 ===
24 May 2019 Round 2	Laois	3-30 - 0-06	Westmeath	O'Moore Park, Portlaoise
	C O'Shaughnessy 1-4, J Duggan 1-3, T Cuddy 0-6, D Dooley and DJ Callaghan (0-2 '65, 0-1 free) 0-4 each, N Quinlan 1-0 (free), A Kirwan 0-3 (frees), D Carroll 0-2, T Keyes, C O'Shaughnessy, P Rafter and K Mulhall 0-1 each.	Report	S Williams 0-5 (0-3 frees), M Glynn 0-1.	Referee: S Guinan (Offaly)

25 May 2019 Round 2	Kildare	7-23 - 1-07	Meath	St. Conleth's Park, Newbridge
	D Melville 4-4; C McCabe 0-3 one free; D Qualter 2-6 three frees; R Stapleton 1-0; F O'Sullivan 0-4; C Boran 0-1; P Dolan 0-1; C O'Donovan 0-1. P O'Donoghue 0-1, D McMahon 0-1; E McConnon 0-1.	Report	C McGovern 0-5 four frees; J Murray 1-0; J Lanigan 0-1.	Referee: J Deehan (Offaly)

=== Leinster Quarter-finals ===
8 June 2019 Quarter-final	Laois	1-16 - 4-17	Wexford	O'Moore Park, Portlaoise
	A Kirwan 0-7 (frees), D Delaney 0-5 (0-4 frees), C O'Shaughnessy 1-0, T Keyes 0-2, J Duggan and T Cuddy 0-1 each.	Report	D Cantwell 2-1, AJ Redmond 0-4 (0-3 frees), R Lawlor and C Byrne (pen) 1-0 each, J Sheil, L Kavanagh, C Molloy, J Moran and C Foley 0-2 each, P Whitty and D O’Neill 0-1 each

8 June 2019 Quarter-final	Kildare	1-23 - 1-20 (aet)	Offaly	St. Conleth's Park, Newbridge
	D Qualter 1-8 (6 frees), C McCabe 0-3 (3 frees), D Melville 0-3; A O'Brien 0-2, J Higgins 0-1, C Boran 0-1, A Hackett 0-1, D McMahon 0-1, A Mooney 0-1, E McConnon 0-1, P Doolan 0-1.	Report	M Troy 0-7 (6 frees), L Nolan 0-5, N Lyons 1-0, J Sweeney 0-2, L Carey 0-2, L Egan 0-1 (free), S Burke 0-1, D Muray 0-1, L Weir 0-1.	Referee: M Ryan (Dublin)

=== Leinster Semi-finals ===
15 June 2019 Semi-final	Dublin	0-19 - 2-16	Wexford	Parnell Park, Dublin
	B McSweeney 0-12 (0-11f, 0-1 '65'), C Murray 0-3, D Purcell, C Keher, C O Tuathaill, J O'Brien (0-1 '65') 0-1 each.	Report	AJ Redmond 1-8 (1-7f), R Lawlor 0-3, D O'Neill 1-0, C Foley 0-2, P Whitty, C Molloy (0-1f), Cian Byrne (St Mogue's) 0-1 each.	Referee: Shane Guinan (Offaly)

15 June 2019 Semi-final	Kildare	0-15 - 2-20	Kilkenny	St. Conleth's Park, Newbridge
	D Qualter 0-6 (5 frees), C McCabe 0-3 (3 frees), D Melville 0-3, J Higgins 0-2, F O'Sullivan 0-1,	Report	T Clifford 1-5 (2 frees), B Drennan 0-8 (4 frees), C O'Sullivan 1-0, I Byrne 0-3 (2 frees), A Hickey 0-1, J Doyle 0-1, B Wheeler 0-1, P McDonald 0-1.	Referee: Thomas Gleeson

=== Leinster Final ===
30 June 2019 Final	Kilkenny	3-10 - 3-14	Wexford	Croke Park, Dublin
	B Drennan 0-5 (5fs), T Clifford 1-1, J Doyle 1-1, P Blanchfield 1-1, L Moore 0-1, I Byrne 0-1.	Report	AJ Redmond 1-11 (9fs), D Cantwell 1-1, C Byrne 1-0, P Whitty 0-1, J Kirwan 0-1.	Referee: Chris Mooney (Dublin)

== Munster Minor Hurling Championship ==
=== Munster group table ===
Key to colours
Advance to Munster final

Pos	Team	Pld	W	D	L	SF	SA	Diff	Pts
1	Limerick	4	2	2	0	3-70	2-55	+18	6
2	Clare	4	3	0	1	2-61	3-51	+7	6
3	Cork	4	2	1	1	5-73	2-68	+14	5
4	Tipperary	4	1	0	3	6-57	9-79	-31	2
5	Waterford	4	0	1	3	3-54	3-62	-8	1

=== Munster group matches ===
==== Munster Round 1 ====
12 May 2019 Round 1	Waterford	0-15 - 0-17	Clare	Walsh Park, Waterford
12:00	A Ryan (0-09 8f), J Burke (0-01), R Halloran (0-02 1f 1’Pen), J Gleeson (0-01)	Report	K Smyth (0-05 4f), C Hegarty (0-04), D Cahill (0-03), C Galvin (0-01 1f), T Butler (0-01), S Meehan (0-01), O O’Donnell (0-01), D Downes (0-01).	Referee: J McCormack (Tipperary)

12 May 2019 Round 1	Cork	2-27 - 1-18	Tipperary	Páirc Uí Chaoimh, Cork
14:00	D Flynn 0-8 (0-3 frees), J Cahalane 2-3, E Twomey 0-4, P O’Riordan 0-3, C McCarthy (St Oliver Plunkett’s) (0-1 free), C Walsh 0-2 each, L Horgan, D Hogan, C McCarthy, J Carr, I Walsh 0-1 each.	Report	J Leamy 0-8 (0-6 frees), J Campion, C Fogarty 0-4 each, D Stakelum 1-0, C O’Dwyer 0-1.	Referee: J O'Halloran (Limerick)

==== Munster Round 2 ====
19 May 2019 Round 2	Tipperary	3-15 - 2-15	Waterford	Semple Stadium, Thurles
12:00	J Leamy (1-8, 1-0 penalty, 6 frees and 1 sideline), C McKelvey (1-1), S Ferncombe (1-0), T Cahill (0-2), P Kinane (0-1), K Shelly (0-1), J Campion (0-1), C Fogarty (0-1).	Report	R Halloran (0-5, 4 frees and 1 '65), J Burke (1-0), C MacCraith (1-0), J Foley (0-2), C Rellis (0-2), M Fitzgerald (0-2), A Ryan (0-2, 1 free), C Berry (0-1), M Cummins (0-1).	Referee: N Wall (Cork)

19 May 2019 Round 2	Limerick	0-19 - 1-16	Cork	LIT Gaelic Grounds, Limerick
14:00	C O’Neill 0-10 (0-8 frees), A O’Connor 0-4, A English 0-3, D Hegarty, P Reale 0-1 each.	Report	D Flynn 1-10 (0-7 frees), D Hogan 0-2, E Twomey, C Walsh, P O’Riordan, J Carr 0-1 each.	Referee: P Kelly (Tipperary)

==== Munster Round 3 ====
2 June 2019 Round 3	Waterford	0-11 - 0-11	Limerick	Walsh Park, Waterford
12:00	R Halloran 0-4 (2f), J Burke 0-3, S Burke, M Fitzgerald, M Cummins, J Foley 0-1 each.	Report	C O'Neill 0-7 (6f), P Kirby 0-2, A O'Connor, A English 0-1 each.	Referee: K Jordan (Tipperary)

2 June 2019 Round 3	Clare	2-13 - 1-09	Tipperary	Cusack Park, Ennis
14:00	K Smyth 1-2 (1-0pen, 2f), D Cahill 1-1, C Hegarty 0-4, T Butler, S Ronan 0-2 each, S Meehan (1f), C Galvin (1f) 0-1 each.	Report	K Shelley 1-0, J Leamy 0-3 (1'65), J Campion 0-2, P Kinane, P Creedon, M Power, C Fogarty 0-1 each.	Referee: S Stokes (Cork)

==== Munster Round 4 ====
8 June 2019 Round 4	Cork	0-19 - 1-13	Waterford	Páirc Uí Chaoimh, Cork
17:00	D Flynn 0-8 (0-6 frees), P O’Riordan 0-3, L Horgan, D Hogan 0-2, B O’Sullivan, J Cahalane, I Walsh, E Twomey 0-1 each.	Report	R Halloran 0-7 (0-6 frees), J Burke 1-1, C Rellis, C Daly 0-2 each, J Booth 0-1.

9 June 2019 Round 4	Limerick	0-16 - 0-13	Clare	LIT Gaelic Grounds, Limerick
14:00	C O'Neill 0-7 (0-5 frees), A Murrihy 0-3, A English 0-2, P Kirby, P Reale, A O'Connor, L Lynch 0-1 each.	Report	K Smyth 0-4 (all frees), S Meehan 0-4, C Murphy 0-2, C Galvin, C Hegarty, D Downes 0-1 each.	Referee: M Maher (Cork)

==== Munster Round 5 ====
16 June 2019 Round 5	Clare	0-18 - 2-11	Cork	Cusack Park, Ennis
12:00	S Meehan (0-06 6f), D Cahill (0-04), C Hegarty (0-03), C Murphy (0-02), K O’Connor (0-02), S Ronan (0-01).	Report	D Flynn (2-02 2f), E Twomey (0-03), J Cahalane (0-03 1’65), D O’Leary (0-02), P O’Riordan (0-01).	Referee: J O'Halloran (Limerick)

16 June 2019 Round 5	Tipperary	1-15 - 3-24	Limerick	Semple Stadium, Thurles
12:00	J Leamy 0-7 (5f); K Shelly 1-0; C O'Dwyer 0-2; J Campion, C Ryan, C Fogarty, T Cahill, K Ryan, C McElvey 0-1 each.	Report	C O'Neill 1-10 (7f); A O'Connor 1-2 (1f); A English 1-1; P O'Donovan 0-3; P Kirby, P Reale, C Casey 0-2 each; L Lynch, E Stokes 0-1 each.	Referee: T Walsh (Waterford)

=== Munster Final ===
30 June 2019 Final	Limerick	1-17 - 1-11	Clare	LIT Gaelic Grounds, Limerick
12:00	C O’Neill (0-9, 0-6 frees); P O’Donovan (1-1); A O’Connor (0-3); A English, P Reale (0-2).	Report	S Meehan (1-2, 0-1 free); C Galvin (two frees), C Hegarty (0-2 each); T Butler, C Murphy, K Smyth, D Cahill, K O’Connor	Referee: N Wall (Cork)

== All-Ireland Minor Hurling Championship ==
For official fixtures and results see All Ireland Minor Hurling Championship @ gaa.ie

=== Quarter-Final Group Stage ===
==== Quarter-Final Group Table ====
Pos	Team	Pld	W	D	L	SF	SA	Diff	Pts
1	Galway	2	2	0	0	4-40	3-38	5	4
2	Kilkenny	2	1	0	1	4-30	3-29	4	2
3	Clare	2	0	0	2	1-35	3-38	-9	0
Green background The top two teams will advance to the All-Ireland semi-finals.

==== Quarter-Final Rounds 1 to 3 ====
6 July 2019 Round 1	Kilkenny	2-14 - 0-13	Clare	Semple Stadium, Thurles
	B Drennan 0-9 (4f, 1 ’65), P Blanchfield 1-3, C O’Sullivan 1-0, J Doyle 0-1, T Clifford 0-1.	Report	C Hegarty 0-4, S Meehan 0-3 (2f), C Galvin 0-3 (2f, 1’65), K O’Connor 0-1, C O’Meara 0-1, O O’Donnell 0-1.	Referee: N Wall (Cork)

14 July 2019 Round 2	Kilkenny	2-16 - 3-16	Galway	Croke Park, Dublin
	I Byrne (2-2); B Drennan (0-7, 0-6 frees); P Blanchfield, T Clifford (0-2), P McDonald, L Moore, C O'Sullivan (0-1)	Report	Greg Thomas (2-2); Sean McDonagh (1-7, 0-3 frees); Gavin Lee, Alex Connaire (0-2); Liam Leen, Tiernan Killeen, Colm Molloy (0-1)	Referee: T Walsh (Waterford)

20 July 2019 Round 3	Clare	1-22 - 1-24	Galway	O'Moore Park, Portlaoise
	S Meehan 0-13 (9fs), C Galvin 1-1 (1f) O O’Donnell, S Ronan 0-2 each, T Butler, C O’Meara, D Cahill and C Hegarty 0-1 each.	Report	Sean McDonagh 1-9 (1-0pen, 5fs, 265), Sean O’Hanlon 0-4, Alex Connaire 0-3, Greg Thomas 0-2, Gavin Lee, Colm Cunningham, Enda Collins, Tiernan Killeen, Liam Leen and Paddy Commins 0-1 each.	Referee: C McAllister (Cork)

=== Semi-finals ===
27 July 2019 Semi-final	Limerick	0-18 - 2-24	Kilkenny	Croke Park, Dublin
	C O’Neill 0-9 (0-6f), A O’Connor 0-3, P Kirby 0-2 (0-1 sideline), E Stokes, A English, J Quilty and E Hurley 0-1 each.	Report	B Drennan 1-8 (0-6f), T Clifford 0-6, J Doyle 1-0, L Moore 0-3, P McDonald and I Doyle 0-2 each, J Aylward 0-1.	Referee: L Gordon (Galway)

28 July 2019 Semi-final	Wexford	0-11 - 0-20	Galway	Croke Park, Dublin
	AJ Redmond 0-5 (0-5f), D Cantwell 0-2, C Byrne (0-1f), J Shiel, L Kavanagh & R Lawlor 0-1 each.	Report	S McDonagh 0-12 (0-9f), A Connaire & T Killeen 0-2 each, C Cunningham, G Lee, G Thomas & P Cummins 0-1 each.	Referee: C Cunning (Antrim)

=== Final ===
18 August 2019 Final	Galway	3-14 - 0-12	Kilkenny	Croke Park, Dublin
	S McDonagh 2-8 (1-0 pen, 6fs, 165), R Davitt 1-2, T Killeen 0-2, G Thomas and A Connaire 0-1 each.	Report	B Drennan 0-6 (5fs), C O’Sullivan 0-2, P McDonald, B Wheeler, T Clifford, and L Moore 0-1 each.	Referee: P Murphy (Carlow)

== Statistics ==
=== Top scorers ===
Top scorer overall

Rank	Player	Club	Tally	Total	Matches	Average
1	Billy Drennan	Kilkenny	2-66	72	9	8.00
2	David Qualter	Kildare	8-37	61	7	8.71
3	A. J. Redmond	Wexford	3-49	58	7	8.28
4	Cathal O'Neill	Limerick	1-52	55	6	9.16
5	Darragh Melville	Kildare	6-27	45	7	6.00
6	Seán McDonagh	Galway	3-35	44	4	11.00
7	Darragh Flynn	Cork	3-28	37	4	9.25
8	Shane Williams	Westmeath	1-33	36	5	7.20
9	Conor McGovern	Meath	1-30	33	4	8.25
9	Shane Meehan	Clare	1-30	33	7	4.71

Top scorers in a single game

Rank	Player	Club	Tally	Total	Opposition
1	Conor McGovern	Meath	0-18	18	Down
2	Darragh Melville	Kildare	4-04	16	Meath
3	A. J. Redmond	Wexford	1-11	14	Kilkenny
4	Cathal O'Neill	Limerick	1-10	13	Tipperary
4	Shane Williams	Westmeath	1-10	13	Kildare
4	Darragh Flynn	Cork	1-10	13	Tipperary
4	Shane Meehan	Clare	0-13	13	Galway
5	David Qualter	Kildare	2-06	12	Meath
5	Seán McDonagh	Galway	1-09	12	Clare
5	Ben McSweeney	Dublin	0-12	12	Wexford
5	Seán McDonagh	Galway	0-12	12	Wexford

=== Miscellaneous ===
- Wexford won the Leinster Championship for the first time since 1985.

== Awards ==
Team of the Year

1. Aidan Tallis
2. Christy Brennan
3. Eoin Lawless
4. Ronan Lyons
5. Ian McGlynn
6. Cian Galvin
7. Peter McDonald
8. Alex Connery
9. Patrick Kirby
10. Greg Thomas
11. Seán McDonagh
12. Cathal O'Neill
13. Billy Drennan
14. A. J. Redmond
15. Shane Meehan
