= 2021 All-Ireland Under-20 Hurling Championship final =

2021 All-Ireland Under-20 Hurling Championship Final
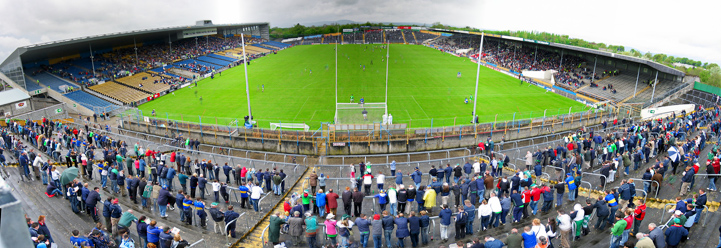
- Event: 2021 All-Ireland Under-20 Hurling Championship
Galway	Cork
2-14	4-19
- Date: 18 August 2021
- Venue: Semple Stadium, Thurles
- Man of the Match: Pádraig Power
- Referee: Johnny Murphy (Limerick)
- Attendance: 4,400

The 2021 All-Ireland Under-20 Hurling Championship final was a hurling match that was played on 18 August 2021 to determine the winners of the 2021 All-Ireland Under-20 Hurling Championship, the 58th season of the All-Ireland Under-20 Hurling Championship, a tournament organised by the Gaelic Athletic Association for the champion teams of Leinster and Munster. The final was contested by Cork of Munster and Galway of Leinster.

The All-Ireland final between Cork and Galway was the third All-Ireland final meeting between the two teams and a first since 1998. Cork were hoping to claim a record 13th All-Ireland title and a second successive title, while Galway were hoping to claim their first title since 2011.

Cork dominated the opening exchanges and led by 1-04 to 0-00 after ten minutes with Darragh Flynn scoring a penalty after three minutes. Cork went eight points ahead before Donal O'Shea got Galway's first score with a free after 14 minutes. He followed with another free directly afterwards but then Galway failed to clear their lines and Jack Cahalane scored Cork's second goal to lead by 2-05 to 0-02 at the first water break. A save from Galway goalkeeper Paddy Rabbitte denied Daniel Hogan a third Cork goal, however, they still ended the half leading by 2-09 to 0-05.

Galway reduced the margin to 2-09 to 0-09 after just five minutes of the second half. The gap was reduced to three when Donal O’Shea scored Galway's first goal after 37 minutes. Almost immediately Cork responded with a Pádraig Power goal. Cork had a six-point lead at the second water break but dominated the final quarter. After scoring seven points during that period they ended the game with a fourth goal, scored by Brian Hayes.

Cork's All-Ireland victory was their second in succession. The win gave them their 13th All-Ireland title overall and put them further ahead in pole position on the all-time roll of honour.

== Match ==
=== Details ===
18 August 2021
19:30

Galway	2-14 - 4-19	Cork
D O’Shea 1-7 (0-7f), A Connaire 1-0, S McDonagh 0-3 (0-1 sideline), G Lee 0-2, J Cooney 0-1, G Thomas 0-1.	Report	P Power 1-5, D Flynn 1-5 (1-0 pen, 4f), B Hayes 1-2, J Cahalane 1-1, B Cunningham 0-2, D Hogan 0-1, S Quirke 0-1, R Cotter 0-1, L Horgan 0-1.

Semple Stadium
Attendance: 4,400
Referee: J Murphy (Limerick)
