= Eoin Downey =

Irish hurler

Personal information
- Native name: Eoin Ó Dúnaigh (Irish)
- Born: 17 May 2003 (age 23) Ballyvolane, Cork, Ireland
- Occupation: Student
- Height: 6 ft 4 in (193 cm)

Sport
- Sport: Hurling
- Position: Full-back
Club*
Years	Club	Apps (scores)
2021-present	Glen Rovers	29 (1-16)
Club titles
- Cork titles: 1
College
- Years: College
- 2022-present: University College Cork
College titles
- Fitzgibbon titles: 0
Inter-county**
Years	County	Apps (scores)
2022-present	Cork	22 (0-04)
Inter-county titles
- Munster titles: 1
- All-Irelands: 0
- NHL: 1
- All Stars: 1
- * club appearances and scores correct as of 21:43, 19 October 2026. **Inter County team apps and scores correct as of 18:30, 21 June 2026.

Eoin Downey (born 17 May 2003) is an Irish hurler. At club level he plays with Glen Rovers and at inter-county level with the Cork senior hurling team.

== Early life ==
Born and raised in Cork, Downey first played hurling to a high standard as a student at Christian Brothers College, Cork. He progressed through the various age grades before joining the school's senior team in 2019. Downey's first year as a senior ended with defeat by St Flannan's College in the 2020 Harty Cup final. He captained CBC to the Dr O'Callaghan Cup title after a 3–13 to 1–12 defeat of Gaelcholáiste Mhuire an Mhainistir Thuaidh in March 2022, in what was his last game for the school. Downey later studied at University College Cork and was added to their Fitzgibbon Cup panel in 2023.

== Club career ==
Downey began his club career at juvenile and underage levels with the Glen Rovers club on the northside of Cork city. He had success in the under-21 grade in 2023 when the Glen won the Cork Premier 1 U21HC title. Downey won a Seandún U21B FC title with the Glen's sister club St Nick's in 2024.

Downey made his senior team debut at midfield in the Glen's 0–24 to 1–10 defeat by Douglas in September 2021. He ended his debut championship season with a 0–24 to 1–18 defeat by Midleton in the final.

== Inter-county career ==
Downey first appeared on the inter-county scene with Cork as a member of the minor team in 2019, before being named team captain in 2020. His minor career ended without success, however, he immediately progressed to the under-20 team. Success in this grade was immediate with Downey claiming Munster and All-Ireland U20HC medals in 2021 after respective defeats of Limerick and Galway. After surrendering their titles the following year, Downey claimed a second Munster U20HC medal after a two-point defeat of Clare in 2023. His last game in the grade saw him claim a second winners' medal after a defeat of Offaly in the 2023 All-Ireland U20 final.

Downey was still a school student when he was called into the Cork senior hurling team by manager Kieran Kingston in 2022. He made his debut in a 2–17 to 0–22 defeat of Limerick in round 1 of the 2023 National Hurling League. Downey lined out at full-back for Cork's 3–29 to 1–34 extra-time defeat by Clare in the 2024 All-Ireland final. He and his brother Rob Downey were both presented with All-Star awards at the end of the 2024 season.

Downey claimed his first senior silverware in April 2025 when Cork won the National Hurling League title following a 3–24 to 0–23 win over Tipperary in the final. This was later followed by a Munster SHC medal after Cork's penalty shootout defeat of Limerick in the 2025 Munster final.

In July 2025, Downey became the first Cork hurler to be sent off in an all-Ireland final when he received a second yellow card during his side's 3–27 to 1–18 defeat against Tipperary in the 2025 All-Ireland final.

== Personal life ==
Downey's older brother Robert is also a hurler.

== Career statistics ==
=== Club ===
As of 18 October 2026

Team	Year	Cork PSHC	
Team	Year	Apps	Score
Glen Rovers	2021	6	0-01
Glen Rovers	2022	4	0-06
Glen Rovers	2023	4	1-01
Glen Rovers	Total	14	1-08
Glen Rovers	Year	Cork SAHC	
Glen Rovers	Year	Apps	Score
Glen Rovers	2024	5	0-01
Glen Rovers	2025	4	0-02
Glen Rovers	2026	6	0-05
Glen Rovers	Total	15	0-08
Career total		29	1-16

=== Inter-county ===
As of 21 June 2026

Team	Year	National League			Munster		All-Ireland		Total	
Team	Year	Division	Apps	Score	Apps	Score	Apps	Score	Apps	Score
Cork	2022	Division 1A	0	0-00	0	0-00	0	0-00	0	0-00
Cork	2023	Division 1A	4	0-01	1	0-00	—		5	0-01
Cork	2024	Division 1A	4	0-01	4	0-00	4	0-00	12	0-01
Cork	2025	Division 1A	4	0-00	5	0-01	2	0-00	11	0-01
Cork	2026	Division 1A	6	0-04	5	0-02	1	0-01	12	0-07
Career total			18	0-06	15	0-03	7	0-01	40	0-10

== Honours ==
Christian Brothers College, Cork

- Dr O'Callaghan Cup: 2022 (c)

Glen Rovers

- Cork Premier Senior Hurling Championship: 2026
- Cork Senior A Hurling Championship: 2024
- Cork Premier Under-21 A Hurling Championship: 2023

St Nicholas'

- Seandún Under-21 B Football Championship: 2024

Cork

- Munster Senior Hurling Championship: 2025
- National Hurling League: 2025
- All-Ireland Under-20 Hurling Championship: 2021, 2023
- Munster Under-20 Hurling Championship: 2021, 2023

Awards

- The Sunday Game Team of the Year: 2024

Individual

- All Star (1): 2024

Sporting positions
Preceded by Ethan Twomey	Cork minor hurling team captain 2020	Succeeded by Ben O'Connor
