= Oisín O'Reilly =

Irish hurler

Personal information
- Native name: Oisín Ó Raghallaigh (Irish)
- Born: 21 August 1997 (age 29) Kilmallock, County Limerick, Ireland
- Occupation: Student
- Height: 5 ft 10 in (178 cm)

Sport
- Sport: Hurling
- Position: Full-forward
Club
- Years: Club
- Kilmallock
Club titles
- Limerick titles: 0
Inter-county*
Years	County	Apps (scores)
2018-	Limerick	5 (0-01)
Inter-county titles
- Munster titles: 2
- All-Irelands: 2
- NHL: 1
- All Stars: 0
- *Inter County team apps and scores correct as of 21:47, 8 July 2023.

Oisín O'Reilly (born 21 August 1997) is an Irish hurler who plays for Limerick Senior Championship club Kilmallock. He usually lines out as a full-forward. O'Reilly is also currently a member of the Limerick senior hurling team.

== Playing career ==
=== Club ===
O'Reilly joined the Kilmallock club at a young age and played in all grades at juvenile and underage levels, before joining the club's senior team.

=== Inter-county ===
==== Minor and under-21 ====
O'Reilly first played for Limerick at minor level. On 2 July 2015, he made his first appearance for the team when he came on as a late substitute in Limerick's 1–14 to 0-14 Munster Championship defeat of Cork.

O'Reilly subsequently joined the Limerick under-21 hurling team in 2016 and played during the team's unsuccessful championship campaign. He was included on the panel again the following season and won a Munster Championship medal after a 0–16 to 1–11 defeat of Cork in the final. On 9 September 2017, he came on as a substitute for Barry Murphy in Limerick's 0–17 to 0–11 defeat of Kilkenny in the All-Ireland final.

==== Under-25 ====
In 2017, O'Reilly joined the Limerick under-25 hurling team. On 18 June 2017, he scored 3-01 from play when Limerick defeated Waterford by 4–12 to 1–19 to win the Munster Championship.

==== Senior ====
O'Reilly joined the Limerick senior hurling panel in 2018 and made his first appearance for the team during the pre-season Munster League. He made his first appearance in the National Hurling League on 4 February 2018 in a 1–24 to 0–10 defeat of Offaly at O'Connor Park. On 19 August 2018, O'Reilly was a member of the extended panel when Limerick won their first All-Ireland title in 45 years after a 3–16 to 2–18 defeat of Galway in the final.

O'Reilly was a member of Limerick's extended panel once again during the 2019 National League, however, he made no appearance during Limerick's eight-game run to the title. He was dropped from the panel prior to the start of the Munster Championship.

== Career statistics ==
As of match played 24 February 2024.

Team	Year	National League			Munster		All-Ireland		Total	
Team	Year	Division	Apps	Score	Apps	Score	Apps	Score	Apps	Score
Limerick	2018	Division 1B	4	1-01	0	0-00	0	0-00	4	1-01
Limerick	2019	Division 1A	0	0-00	—		—		0	0-00
2020	Division 1A	Division 1A	0	0-00	—		—		0	0-00
2021	Division 1A	Division 1A								
2022		Division 1A	2	1-00	4	0-01	0	0-00	6	1-01
2023		Division 1A	3	0-01	0	0-00	1	0-00	4	0-01
2024			1	0-00	0	0-00	0	0-00	1	0-00
Total			10	2-02	4	0-01	1	0-00	15	2-03

== Honours ==
Limerick

- All-Ireland Senior Hurling Championship (1): 2018
- National Hurling League (1): 2019
- Munster Senior Hurling League (1): 2018
- Munster Under-25 Reserve Hurling Competition (1): 2017
- All-Ireland Under-21 Hurling Championship (1): 2017
- Munster Under-21 Hurling Championship (1): 2017
