= Peter McDonald (hurler) =

Irish hurler (born 2002)

Personal information
- Native name: Peadar Mac Dónaill (Irish)
- Born: 2002 Thomastown, County Kilkenny, Ireland
- Occupation: Student
- Height: 6 ft 0 in (183 cm)

Sport
- Sport: Hurling
- Position: Midfield
Club
- Years: Club
- Thomastown
Club titles
- Kilkenny titles: 1
College
- Years: College
- University College Dublin
College titles
- Fitzgibbon titles: 0
Inter-county
- Years: County
- 2025-: Kilkenny
Inter-county titles
- Leinster titles: 0
- All-Irelands: 0
- NHL: 0
- All Stars: 0

Peter McDonald (born 2002) is an Irish hurler. At club level he plays with Thomastown and at inter-county level with the Kilkenny senior hurling team.

== Career ==
McDonald played hurling at all levels as a student at St Kieran's College in Kilkenny. He was part of the St Kieran's team that won the Leinster PPS JAHC title in 2017, before later beating Thurles CBS by 1–13 to 0–14 in the All-Ireland PPS JAHC final. McDonald later progressed to the St Kieran's senior hurling team. He has also lined out with University College Dublin in the Fitzgibbon Cup.

At club level, plays with Thomastown. He won a Kilkenny IHC title in 2023, following a 1–29 to 0–17 defeat of Mooncoin in the final. McDonald later claimed a Leinster Club IHC title, before lining out at midfield in the 2–23 to 0–13 win over Castlelyons in the 2024 All-Ireland club final. He also added a Kilkenny SHC medal to his collection in 2024, following a defeat of O'Loughlin Gaels.

McDonald first appeared on the inter-county scene for Kilkenny as a member of the minor team that lost the 2019 All-Ireland minor final to Galway. He ended the season by being named on the Team of the Year. McDonald subsequently progressed to the under-20 team and was at wing-forward when Kilkenny beat Limerick in the 2022 All-Ireland under-20 final.

McDonald joined the senior team in advance of the 2025 season, and was named vice-captain of the team.

== Honours ==
St Kieran's College

- All-Ireland PPS Junior A Hurling Championship: 2017
- Leinster PPS Junior A Hurling Championship: 2017

Thomastown

- Kilkenny Senior Hurling Championship: 2024
- All-Ireland Intermediate Club Hurling Championship: 2024
- Leinster Intermediate Club Hurling Championship: 2023
- Kilkenny Intermediate Hurling Championship: 2023

Kilkenny

- All-Ireland Under-20 Hurling Championship: 2022
- Leinster Under-20 Hurling Championship: 2022
