= 2018–19 Harty Cup =

Hurling tournament

2018–19 Dr Harty Cup
- Dates: 17 October 2018 – 16 February 2019
- Teams: 13
- Champions: Midleton CBS (4th title); Dylan Hogan (captain); Iain Cooney (manager)
- Runners-up: Christian Brothers College, Cork; Shane Barrett (captain); Tony Wall (manager)

Tournament statistics
- Matches played: 22
- Goals scored: 73 (3.32 per match)
- Points scored: 644 (29.27 per match)
- Top scorer(s): Pádraig Power (2-38)

The 2018–19 Dr Harty Cup was the 99th staging of the Harty Cup since its establishment in hurling by the Munster Council of Gaelic Athletic Association in 1918. The draw for the group stage placings took place on 29 June 2018. The competition ran from 17 October 2018 to 16 February 2019.

Ardscoi Rís unsuccessfully defended its title several times in the group stage after suffering two defeats.

Midleton CBS won the Harty Cup final on 16 February 2019 at Páirc Uí Rinn in Cork, against Christian Brothers College, Cork, 2–12 to 0–14, in what was their first ever meeting in a final, for their fourth successive Harty Cup title overall and a first title since 2006.

Christian Brothers College's Pádraig Power was the top scorer with 2-38.

== Group A ==
=== Group A table ===
Knockout stage

Team	Matches				Score			Pts
Team	Pld	W	D	L	For	Against	Diff	Pts
St Colman's College	3	3	0	0	67	41	26	6
Nenagh CBS	3	2	0	1	62	57	5	4
Ardscoil Rís	3	1	0	2	57	66	-9	2
Gaelcholáiste Mhuire	3	0	0	3	30	52	-22	0

=== Group A results ===
17 October 2018 Round 1	St Colman's College	3-18 - 1-11	Nenagh CBS	Leahy Park
	D Lardiner (0-11, 0-8 frees); B Roche (1-1), J Kearney (1-0), P O’Leary (1-0), C Ryan (0-2), E Carey (0-2), E Roche (0-1), D Morrisson (0-1).	Report	B McLoughney (1-4 frees), K McCarthy (0-7, 0-4 frees).

17 October 2018 Round 1	Ardscoil Rís	0-18 - 1-09	Gaelcholáiste Mhuire	Mallow GAA Complex
	C O’Neill (0-8, 0-7 frees, 0-1 '65), E McEvoy, A McNamara, A O’Connor and A Moriarty (0-2 each), C Bourke and B O’Connor (0-1 each).	Report	D Ó Conaire (1-3, frees), S Ó Riagáin (0-5, 0-3 frees), K Moynihan (0-1).

7 November 2018 Round 2	Nenagh CBS	2-23 - 3-12	Ardscoil Rís	Lacken Park
	B McLoughney 1-13 (0-10 frees); K McCarthy 0-4 (3 frees); C O’Brien 1-0; S Hayes, K O’Kelly 0-2 each; C Moran, C Hennessy 0-1 each.	Report	C O’Neill 1-4 (0-4 frees); S Connolly 1-2; C Bourke 1-1; A O’Connor, A Moriarty, A McNamara, E McEvoy, C Coughlan 0-1 each.

15 November 2018 Round 2	St Colman's College	1-12 - 0-09	Gaelcholáiste Mhuire	Páirc Bhríde
	D Lardner (0-6, 0-4 frees), D Morrison (1-0), E Carey (0-3, 0-1 65), B Roche (0-2), J Kearney (0-1).	Report	D Ó Conaire (0-2 frees, 0-1 65) and S Ó Riagáin (0-2 frees) (0-4 each), D Ó Teimhneáin (0-1).

21 November 2018 Round 3	Nenagh CBS	3-10 - 0-09	Gaelcholáiste Mhuire	Michael Fox Park
	B McLoughney 2-3, (2f); K McCarthy 0-5 (3f); B Cooney 1-0; Conal Moran 0-2.	Report	S Ó Riagaín 0-5 (0-2f, 0-1sl); R Ó Murchú, C Ó Muimhneacháin, D Ó Liatháin, L Donnabháin (f) 0-1 each.

21 November 2018 Round 3	St Colman's College	2-19 - 1-15	Ardscoil Rís	FitzGerald Park
	D Lardner (0-8, 0-6 frees), D Flynn and E Carey (0-4 each), J Kearney and P O’Leary (1-0 each), D Morrison, P O’Flynn and C Barry (0-1 each).	Report	C O’Neill (1-7, 1-0 pen, 0-4 frees), C Bourke (0-4), S Long (0-3), A Moriarty (0-1).

== Group B ==
=== Group B table ===
Knockout stage

Team	Matches				Score			Pts
Team	Pld	W	D	L	For	Against	Diff	Pts
Midleton CBS	2	1	1	0	41	29	12	3
De La Salle College	2	1	1	0	33	31	2	3
St Flannan's College	2	0	0	2	28	42	-14	0

=== Group B results ===
17 October 2018 Round 1	De La Salle College Waterford	2-11 - 1-12	St Flannan's College	Boherlahen Grounds
	G Corbett 2-0, T Gallagher (2fs), C Power (2fs) 0-3 each, M Fitzgerald 0-2, A Kirwan, C Ryan, M Cummins 0-1 each.	Report	R Mounsey 0-6 (3fs), D O'Brien 1-2, K Keane, C Galvin, C Hegarty, A Brohan 0-1 each.

7 November 2018 Round 2	De La Salle College Waterford	2-10 - 1-13	Midleton CBS	Bushy Park
	C Power 2-5 (0-2f), T Gallagher 0-2f, C Wadding, G Corbett, M Fitzgerald 0-1 each.	Report	R O’Regan 0-8 (0-4f), J Stack 1-2, A Nganogu, G Carroll, C Farmer 0-1 each.

21 November 2018 Round 3	Midleton CBS	2-19 - 1-10	St Flannan's College	St John's Park
	R O’Regan 1-4 (3f), R McCarthy 0-6 (2f, 2 s/l), J Stack 1-3, G Carroll and K Farmer 0-2 each, J Hankard and C Hickey 0-1 each.	Report	C Galvin 0-4 (2f), K Keane 1-1, A Brohan 0-3 (3f), D O’Brien and C Hegarty 0-1 each.

== Group C ==
=== Group C table ===
Knockout stage

Team	Matches				Score			Pts
Team	Pld	W	D	L	For	Against	Diff	Pts
John the Baptist CS	2	2	0	0	51	33	18	4
Our Lady's SS	2	1	0	1	42	55	-13	2
Blackwater CS	2	0	0	2	31	46	-15	0

=== Group C results ===
17 October 2018 Round 1	John the Baptist Community School	3-22 - 1-13	Our Lady's Secondary School	MacDonagh Park
	D O'Shea 1-9 (0-6 frees, 0-2 '65), B O'Grady 0-7, M Martin 0-3, R Tobin 1-0, A O'Heney 0-2, P Reale 0-1.	Report	G O'Connor 0-5 (0-2 frees), D Lawlor 1-0, J Devanney 0-2, both frees, C Ryan 0-2, T Cahill, K Maher (free), J Campion 0-1 each.

7 November 2018 Round 2	Our Lady's Secondary School	2-20 - 2-08	Blackwater Community School	Dundrum Grounds
	G O’Connor (0-11, 0-8 frees), C Ryan (1-2); J Devaney (1-2), K Ryan (0-4); C McGrath (0-1).	Report	O O’Gorman (1-2, 0-2 frees), A Ryan (0-5, 0-4 frees), J Murphy (1-0), T Flynn (0-1).

21 November 2018 Round 3	Blackwater Community School	0-17 - 2-14	John the Baptist Community School	Ardfinnan Grounds
	A Ryan (0-13, 10 frees); G Fives, O O’Gorman (0-2 each).	Report	D O’Shea (1-4, 2 frees); O O’Grady (1-1); B O’Grady (0-4, 1 free); M Martin (0-2); R Tobin (0-1).

== Group D ==
=== Group D table ===
Knockout stage

Team	Matches				Score			Pts
Team	Pld	W	D	L	For	Against	Diff	Pts
Christian Brothers College	2	2	0	0	68	26	42	4
Thurles CBS	2	1	0	1	44	37	7	2
Castletroy College	2	0	0	2	16	65	-49	0

=== Group D results ===
17 October 2018 Round 1	Christian Brothers College, Cork	6-19 - 0-10	Castletroy College	Michael Fox Park
	J Cahalane (1-6, 4 frees), O McCarthy (2-1), P Power (1-3), S Barrett and D Hanlon (1-1 each), J Scally (0-2), J O’Kelly, N Hartnett, C O’Donovan, C Long and C Daly (0-1 each).	Report	C Long; D Barry, P Hennessy, C Murphy; C O’Donovan, I Daly, G Mulcahy; D Hanlon, K Finn; S Barrett, N Hartnett, P Power; O McCarthy, J O’Kelly, J Cahalane.

7 November 2018 Round 2	Thurles CBS	2-22 - 0-06	Castletroy College	MacDonagh Park
	L Cashin (1-9, 0-5 frees), M Hackett (0-4), P Creedon (1-0), D Ryan (0-3, 0-1 ‘65s), E Morris (0-3, 0-1 frees), J Morrissey (0-1), D Flood (0-1).	Report	R Reale (0-3, 0-3 frees), A Rowsome (0-2), D Hegarty (0-1, 0-1 free).

21 November 2018 Round 3	Christian Brothers College, Cork	4-19 - 1-13	Thurles CBS	Canon Hayes Park
	P Power 0-9 (5F, 1 '65'), S Barrett 1-3, K Finn 1-2, O McCarthy 1-0, J Cahalane 1-0, J O'Kelly 0-2, D Hanlon 0-1, I Daly 0-1, J Scally 0-1;	Report	L Cashin 0-8 (6F), M Hackett 1-2, E Morris 0-1, D Flood 0-1, P Creedon 0-1.

== Knockout stage ==
=== Quarter-finals ===
9 January 2019 Quarter-final	Christian Brothers College, Cork	2-14 - 2-12	Nenagh CBS	FitzGerald Park
	P Power (1-8, 0-6 frees, 0-1 ‘65); D Hanlon (1-1); S Barrett (0-3, 0-1 sc); C O’Donovan (0-1 free), O McCarthy (0-1 each).	Report	B McLoughney (1-7, 1-6 frees, 0-1 ‘65); C McKelvey (1-0); K McCarthy, C Moran (0-2 each); C Hennessey (0-1 free).

9 January 2019 Quarter-final	De La Salle College Waterford	1-14 - 0-14	St Colman's College	Fraher Field
	C Power (0-6, 0-5 frees), A Kirwin (1-0), T Gallagher (0-3 frees), P Leavey (0-1 free) and E Reilly (0-2 each), M Fitzgerald (0-1).	Report	D Lardner (frees) and D Flynn (0-4 each), E Carey (0-3, 0-2 frees), J Kearney, B Roche and C Barry (0-1 each).

9 January 2019 Quarter-final	Midleton CBS	7-15 - 0-19	Our Lady's Secondary School	Canon Hayes Park
	C Farmer 2-2, J Hankard 2-1, R McCarthy 1-2 (0-1f, 0-1 65), G Carroll 1-1, J Stack 1-1, R O’Regan 0-4 (0-3f), C Hickey 0-2 (0-1f), D Healy 0-1, S Walsh 0-1f.	Report	G O’Connor 0-14 (0-7f, 0-165), J Devanney 0-2, C Ryan 0-2, F Purcell 0-1.

9 January 2019 Quarter-final	Thurles CBS	3-31 - 4-28 (aet)	John the Baptist Community School	Dundrum Grounds
	D Ryan 0-14 (10 frees), P Creedon 3-1, J Lanigan 0-4, L Cashin 0-4, E Purcell 0-3, J Leamy 0-2, M Hackett 0-1, K Ryan 0-1, J Lee 0-1	Report	D O’Shea 2-17 (one penalty goal, one free goal, 13 frees), P Reale 1-1, R Tobin 1-0, O O’Grady 0-4, P Morrissey 0-3, B O’Grady 0-3.

=== Semi-finals ===
26 January 2019 Semi-final	Christian Brothers College, Cork	2-12 - 0-13	Thurles CBS	Michael Fox Park
	P Power (0-8, 0-7 frees), S Barrett (1-2), J Cahalane (1-0), D Hanlon (0-2).	Report	D Ryan (0-9, 0-8 frees), L Cashin (0-2), P Creedon and K Ryan (0-1 each).

26 January 2019 Semi-final	Midleton CBS	1-11 - 0-12	De La Salle College Waterford	Fraher Field
	R O’Regan (0-5, 2f), R McCarthy (1-1f), G Carroll (0-2), J Stack, C Hickey, C Joyce (0-1 each).	Report	M Fitzgerald 0-5 (0-1f), E Reilly (0-4), C Power (0-2, 1f), T Gallagher (0-1).

=== Final ===
16 February 2019 Final	Midleton CBS	2-12 - 0-14	Christian Brothers College, Cork	Páirc Uí Rinn
	R McCarthy (0-6, 0-5 frees, 0-1 ‘65); R O’Regan (0-4, 0-2 frees); J Stack (1-1); J Hankard (1-0); C Hickey (0-1 each).	Report	P Power (0-10, 0-8 frees, 0-1 ‘65); D Hanlon (0-2); S Barrett, O McCarthy (0-1 each).	Attendance: 7,089; Referee: J Murphy (Limerick)

== Statistics ==
=== Top scorers ===
Rank	Player	Club	Tally	Total	Matches	Average
1	Pádraig Power	CBC Cork	2-38	44	5	8.80
2	Bryan McLoughney	Nenagh CBS	5-27	42	4	10.50
2	Dylan O'Shea	John the Baptist CS	4-30	42	3	14.00
4	Gearóid O'Connor	Our Lady's SS	0-30	30	3	10.00
5	David Lardner	St Colman's College	0-29	29	4	7.25
6	Ross O'Regan	Midleton CBS	1-25	28	5	5.60
7	Luke Cashin	Thurles CBS	1-23	26	4	6.50
7	Devon Ryan	Thurles CBS	0-26	26	4	6.50
9	Cathal O'Neill	Ardscoil Rís	2-19	25	3	8.33
10	Cormac Power	De La Salle College	2-16	22	4	5.50
