= Dean Brosnan =

Irish hurler

Personal information
- Native name: Déin Ó Brosnacháin (Irish)
- Nickname: Brozy
- Born: 24 June 1991 (age 35) Blackpool, Cork, Ireland
- Occupation: Primary school teacher
- Height: 6 ft 2 in (188 cm)

Sport
- Sport: Hurling
- Position: Left wing-forward
Club*
Years	Club	Apps (scores)
2009-present	Glen Rovers	52 (9-75)
Club titles
- Cork titles: 2
College(s)
- Years: College
- University College Cork; St Patrick's College, Dublin
College titles
- Fitzgibbon titles: 1
Inter-county**
Years	County	Apps (scores)
2016-2018	Cork	4 (0-01)
Inter-county titles
- Munster titles: 2
- All-Irelands: 0
- NHL: 0
- All Stars: 0
- * club appearances and scores correct as of 16:53, 15 November 2019. **Inter County team apps and scores correct as of 10:53, 14 January 2019.

Dean Brosnan (born 24 June 1991) is an Irish hurler who plays for Cork Senior Championship club Glen Rovers. He was a member of the Cork senior hurling team for three seasons, during which time he usually lined as a forward, either in the half-forward or full-forward line.

== Playing career ==
=== University College Cork ===
During his studies at University College Cork, Brosnan was selected for the college's senior hurling team on a number of occasions. On 3 March 2012, he won a Fitzgibbon Cup medal after coming on as a 55th-minute substitute for Dan McCormack when the university defeated the Cork Institute of Technology by 2–15 to 2–14 in the final.

=== Glen Rovers ===
Brosnan joined the Glen Rovers club at a young age and played in all grades at juvenile and underage levels, winning a Cork Under-21 Championship medal as a 17-year-old in 2008. He made his first appearance for the club's senior team on 8 August 2009 in a 1–21 to 0-13 Cork Senior Championship quarter-final defeat by Newtownshandrum.

On 11 October 2015, Brosnan won his first Cork Senior Championship medal after scoring three points from play when Glen Rovers defeated Sarsfields by 2–17 to 1–13 in the final.

Brosnan won his second Cork Senior Championship medal on 9 October 2016 when he scored four points in a 0–19 to 2–11 defeat of Erin's Own in the final.

On 20 October 2019, Brosnan played in his fifth final when Glen Rovers faced Imokilly. Lining out at right wing-forward, he scored two points from play but ended the game on the losing side following a 2–17 to 1–16 defeat.

=== Cork ===
==== Minor and under-21 ====
Brosnan first played for Cork at minor level on 24 June 2009 and scored 1–01 in a 5-17 apiece draw with Tipperary in the Munster Championship. His one season in this grade ended without silverware.

Brosnan was subsequently selected for the Cork under-21 team and made his first appearance on 3 August 2011 as a substitute in a 4–20 to 1-27 Munster Championship defeat by Limerick. He was included on the Cork under-21 team the following year.

==== Senior ====
Brosnan was added to the Cork senior hurling panel in late 2015 and made his first appearances during the pre-season 2016 Munster League. He was an unused substitute for Cork's subsequent National Hurling League and All-Ireland Championship matches.

Brosnan made his first National League appearance 11 February 2017, replacing Shane Kingston in a 0–21 to 1–11 defeat of Clare. He later made his first Munster Championship appearance on 18 June, coming on as a substitute for Alan Cadogan in a 0–21 to 1–15 defeat of Waterford at the semi-final stage. On 9 July, he won his first Munster Championship medal as a non-playing substitute following a 1–25 to 1–20 defeat of Clare in the final.

On 1 July 2018, Brosnan won a second successive Munster Championship medal after being introduced as a 73rd-minute for Lorcán McLoughlin in Cork's 2–24 to 3–19 defeat of Clare in the final.

== Career statistics ==
=== Club ===
As of match played 10 November 2019.

Team	Year	Cork		Munster		All-Ireland		Total	
Team	Year	Apps	Score	Apps	Score	Apps	Score	Apps	Score
Glen Rovers	2009-10	1	0-00	—		—		1	0-00
Glen Rovers	2010-11	8	3-08	—		—		8	3-08
Glen Rovers	2011-12	2	0-05	—		—		2	0-05
Glen Rovers	2012-13	4	1-04	—		—		4	1-04
Glen Rovers	2013-14	3	0-05	—		—		3	0-05
Glen Rovers	2014-15	6	1-08	—		—		6	1-08
Glen Rovers	2015-16	6	0-06	1	0-00	—		7	0-06
Glen Rovers	2016-17	5	2-10	2	0-02	—		7	2-12
Glen Rovers	2017-18	6	0-17	—		—		6	0-17
Glen Rovers	2018-19	2	1-01	—		—		2	1-01
Glen Rovers	2019-20	5	1-07	1	0-02	—		6	1-09
Total		48	9-71	4	0-04	—		52	9-75

=== Inter-county ===
As of match played 29 July 2018.

Team	Year	National League			Munster		All-Ireland		Total	
Team	Year	Division	Apps	Score	Apps	Score	Apps	Score	Apps	Score
Cork	2016	Division 1A	0	0-00	0	0-00	0	0-00	0	0-00
Cork	2017	Division 1A	5	0-03	1	0-00	0	0-00	6	0-03
Cork	2018	Division 1A	2	0-03	3	0-01	0	0-00	5	0-04
Total			7	0-06	4	0-01	0	0-00	11	0-07

== Honours ==
University College Cork

- Fitzgibbon Cup (1): 2012

Glen Rovers

- Cork Senior Hurling Championship (2): 2015, 2016
- Cork Senior A Hurling Championship (1): 2024
- Cork Under-21 Hurling Championship (1): 2008

Cork

- Munster Senior Hurling Championship (2): 2017, 2018
- Munster Senior Hurling League (1): 2017
