= Shane Williams (hurler) =

Irish hurler

Personal information
- Born: October 27, 2002 (age 24) Collinstown, County Westmeath, Ireland

Sport
- Sport: Hurling
- Position: Left corner-forward
Club
- Years: Club
- Lough Lene Gaels
Club titles
- Westmeath titles: 0
Inter-county
- Years: County
- 2020–2023: Westmeath
Inter-county titles
- Leinster titles: 0
- All-Irelands: 0
- NHL: 0
- All Stars: 0

Shane Williams (born 2002) is an Irish hurler. At club level he plays with Lough Lene Gaels, while he has also lined out at inter-county level with various Westmeath teams.

== Career ==
Williams first played hurling at juvenile and underage levels with the Lough Lene Gaels club in Collinstown. He subsequently progressed to adult level, however, he has enjoyed little success to date.

He first appeared on the inter-county scene with Westmeath during a two-year tenure with the minor team in 2018 and 2019. He later spent a number of seasons with the under-20 team and was the team's top scorer in 2022. By this stage, Williams had already joined the Westmeath senior hurling team. He came on as a substitute when Westmeath beat Kerry by 2–28 to 1–24 to claim the Joe McDonagh Cup title in 2021.

== Honours ==
Westmeath

- Joe McDonagh Cup: 2021
