= Simon Kennefick =

Irish hurler

Personal information
- Native name: Síomón Ciniféic (Irish)
- Born: 1999 (age 26–27) Cork, Ireland
- Occupation: Secondary school teacher

Sport
- Sport: Hurling
- Position: Left wing-forward
Club*
Years	Club	Apps (scores)
2018-present	Glen Rovers	40 (13-75)
Club titles
- Cork titles: 1
College
- Years: College
- 2018-2022: University College Cork
Inter-county**
Years	County	Apps (scores)
2019-2021	Cork	0 (0-00)
Inter-county titles
- Munster titles: 0
- All-Irelands: 0
- NHL: 0
- All Stars: 0
- * club appearances and scores correct as of 22:15, 19 October 2026. **Inter County team apps and scores correct as of 21:58, 5 February 2026.

Simon Kennefick (born 1999) is an Irish hurler who plays as a forward for club side Glen Rovers and at inter-county level with the Cork senior hurling team. He is a grandson of Christy Ring.

== Career ==
=== Glen Rovers ===
Kennefick joined the Glen Rovers club at a young age and played in all levels at juvenile and underage levels. It was the club with whom his grandfather, Christy Ring, won a record 14 championship titles. Kennefick had his first championship success at minor level when Glen Rovers secured the 2017 Premier 1 Championship title after a 0–19 to 1–11 defeat of Midleton in the final. He was subsequently drafted onto the Glen Rovers senior team and made his championship debut on 28 April 2018 when he scored 1–03 in a first round defeat of Ballymartle. Kennefick lined out in three successive county finals over the following three seasons, experiencing defeats to Imokilly in 2019, Blackrock in 2020 and Midleton in 2021.

=== Cork ===
==== Under-21 and under-20 ====
Kennefick never played at minor level for Cork, but was drafted onto the under-21 team in 2018. He was a member of the extended training panel when Cork secured the Munster Championship title after 2–23 to 1–13 defeat of Tipperary in the final. He was again eligible for the now renamed under-20 grade the following year and made his first appearance at right wing-forward in a 1–20 to 0-16 first-round defeat of Limerick. On 24 August 2019, Kennefick was a late addition to the Cork starting fifteen that suffered a 5–17 to 1–18 defeat by Tipperary in the All-Ireland final.

==== Senior ====
Kennefick made his first appearance for Cork at senior level when he was selected on the team at right wing-forward for the annual Canon O'Brien Cup game against University College Cork in January 2019. He scored four points from play in the 1–24 to 1–23 victory but was not included on the Cork panel for the rest of the season.

In May 2021, Kennefick received his first competitive call-up at senior level when he was named amongst the substitutes for Cork's National League game against Westmeath.

== Career statistics ==
=== Club ===
As of 18 October 2026

Team	Year	Cork SHC	
Team	Year	Apps	Score
Glen Rovers	2018	2	1-05
Glen Rovers	2019	5	1-06
Glen Rovers	Total	7	2-11
Glen Rovers	Year	Cork PSHC	
Glen Rovers	Year	Apps	Score
Glen Rovers	2020	5	5-08
Glen Rovers	2021	6	0-09
Glen Rovers	2022	4	0-11
Glen Rovers	2023	4	1-04
Glen Rovers	Total	19	6-32
Glen Rovers	Year	Cork SAHC	
Glen Rovers	Year	Apps	Score
Glen Rovers	2024	5	3-13
Glen Rovers	Total	5	3-13
Glen Rovers	Year	Cork PSHC	
Glen Rovers	Year	Apps	Score
Glen Rovers	2025	3	0-06
Glen Rovers	2026	6	2-13
Glen Rovers	Total	9	2-19
Career total		40	13-75

=== Inter-county ===
As of match played 21 May 2021.

Team	Year	National League			Munster		All-Ireland		Total	
Team	Year	Division	Apps	Score	Apps	Score	Apps	Score	Apps	Score
Cork	2019	Division 1A	—		—		—		—	
Cork	2020	Division 1A	—		—		—		—	
Cork	2021	Division 1A	0	0-00	0	0-00	0	0-00	0	0-00
Career total			9	0-00	0	0-00	0	0-00	0	0-00

== Honours ==
Glen Rovers

- Cork Senior A Hurling Championship: 2024
- Premier 1 Minor Hurling Championship: 2017

Cork

- Canon O'Brien Cup: 2019
- Munster Under-21 Hurling Championship: 2018
