= Paddy Hayes =

Irish Gaelic footballer

Personal information
- Native name: Pádraig Ó hAodha (Irish)
- Born: 21 June 1966 (age 60) Cork, Ireland
- Occupation: Company rep
- Height: 6 ft 3 in (191 cm)

Sport
- Sport: Gaelic Football
- Position: Right wing-forward
Club
- Years: Club
- St Finbarr's
Club titles
- Cork titles: 1
- Munster titles: 1
- All-Ireland Titles: 1
Inter-county*
Years	County	Apps (scores)
1986-1992	Cork	12 (0-01)
Inter-county titles
- Munster titles: 2
- All-Irelands: 1
- NFL: 0
- All Stars: 0
- *Inter County team apps and scores correct as of 18:09, 3 January 2013.

Patrick Hayes (born 21 June 1966) is an Irish former Gaelic footballer who played as a right wing-forward at senior level for the Cork county team.

Hayes joined the team during the 1986 championship and was a regular member of the starting fifteen until his retirement after the 1992 championship. During that time he won one All-Ireland and two Munster medals. Evans was an All-Ireland runner-up on one occasion.

At club level Hayes is a one-time All-Ireland medalist with St Finbarr's. In addition to this he has also won one Munster medal and one county club championship medal.
