= Darragh Flynn =

Irish hurler

Personal information
- Native name: Darragh Ó Floinn (Irish)
- Born: 2002 (age 23–24) Mitchelstown, County Cork, Ireland
- Occupation: Student
- Height: 5 ft 11 in (180 cm)

Sport
- Sport: Hurling
- Position: Midfield/Forward
Club
- Years: Club
- Ballygiblin
Club titles
- Cork titles: 0
College
- Years: College
- University College Cork
College titles
- Fitzgibbon titles: 0
Inter-county*
Years	County	Apps (scores)
2021-	Cork	0 (0-00)
Inter-county titles
- Munster titles: 0
- All-Irelands: 0
- NHL: 1
- All Stars: 0
- *Inter County team apps and scores correct as of 15:52, 12 December 2021.

Darragh Flynn (born 2002) is an Irish hurler who plays for Cork Intermediate Championship club Ballygiblin. He also joined the Cork senior hurling team in advance of the 2022 season.

== Career ==
Flynn played hurling competitively at juvenile and underage levels with the Ballygiblin club. He later progressed onto the club's top adult team and won a County Junior A Championship title in 2021. By this stage Flynn was a member of the Cork minor hurling team during the 2019 Munster Minor Championship. He later won consecutive All-Ireland Under-20 Championship titles with the under-20 team. Flynn's performances in this grade earned a call-up to the senior team training panel in December 2021.

== Career statistics ==
Team	Year	National League			Munster		All-Ireland		Total	
Team	Year	Division	Apps	Score	Apps	Score	Apps	Score	Apps	Score
Cork	2022	Division 1A	0	0-00	0	0-00	0	0-00	0	0-00
Career total			0	0-00	0	0-00	0	0-00	0	0-00

== Honours ==
Ballygiblin

- All-Ireland Junior Club Hurling Championship: 2023
- Munster Junior Club Hurling Championship: 2021, 2022
- Cork Premier Junior Hurling Championship: 2022
- Cork Junior A Hurling Championship: 2021

Cork

- National Hurling League: 2025
- All-Ireland Under-20 Hurling Championship: 2020, 2021
- Munster Under-20 Hurling Championship: 2020, 2021

Sporting positions
Preceded by Brian O'Sullivan	Cork minor hurling team captain 2019	Succeeded by Ethan Twomey
