= Pádraig Power =

Irish hurler

Personal information
- Native name: Pádraig de Paor (Irish)
- Nickname: Paudie
- Born: 2001 (age 24–25) Blarney, County Cork, Ireland
- Occupation: Project coordinator
- Height: 6 ft 0 in (183 cm)

Sport
- Sport: Hurling
- Position: Full-forward
Club*
Years	Club	Apps (scores)
2019-present	Blarney	29 (7-68)
Club titles
- Cork titles: 0
College
- Years: College
- 2019-2023: University College Cork
College titles
- Fitzgibbon titles: 0
Inter-county**
Years	County	Apps (scores)
2022-present	Cork	5 (0-00)
Inter-county titles
- Munster titles: 0
- All-Irelands: 0
- NHL: 1
- All Stars: 0
- * club appearances and scores correct as of 18:06, 20 April 2026. **Inter County team apps and scores correct as of 18:06, 20 April 2026.

Pádraig Power (born 2001) is an Irish hurler who plays as a forward for club side Blarney and at inter-county level with the Cork senior hurling team.

== Early life ==
Born and raised in Blarney, County Cork, Power attended Christian Brothers College in Cork. He progressed through the various grades of hurling before joining the school's senior team in 2017. Power's final year with the college ended with defeat by Midleton CBS in the 2019 Harty Cup final, before losing to St Kieran's College in the All-Ireland semi-final. In spite of these defeats, he won a Dr O'Callaghan Cup medal in 2019, following a 2–22 to 2–16 win over St Colman's College.

Power later studied at University College Cork and immediately joined their freshers' hurling team before later joining UCC's Fitzgibbon Cup panel.

== Club career ==
Power began his club career at juvenile and underage levels with the Blarney club. He had his first major success when Blarney beat Carrigaline by 1–11 to 0–12 to claim the Cork Premier 2 MHC title in 2016. He was still eligible for the minor grade two years later when Midleton beat Blarney by 1–22 to 1–10 to win the Cork Premier 1 MHC title.

Power immediately progressed to adult level and made his championship debut in April 2019 in a 0–24 to 2–12 defeat of Ballinhassig. He won a Cork PIHC medal in October 2020 after scoring 1–02 from play in Blarney's 1–20 to 0–15 defeat of Castlelyons in the final. Power was one of the team's top scorers from play in 2023, when Blarney ended their Cork SAHC campaign with a defeat by Bride Rovers in a final replay.

== Inter-county career ==
Power first appeared on the inter-county scene for Cork as a member of the minor team in 2018. He immediately progressed to the under-20 team, however, he ended his first season without success, as Cork were beaten by Tipperary in the Munster and All-Ireland finals in 2019. Power's second year in the under-20 grade saw him claim Munster and All-Ireland U20HC medals after respective defeats of Tipperary and Dublin. Success in the grade continued the following year, with Power claiming consecutive Munster and All-Ireland U20HC medals after respective defeats of Limerick and Galway.

Power joined the Cork senior hurling team in advance of the 2022 National League.

== Career statistics ==
=== Club ===
As of 4 October 2025

Team	Year	Cork PIHC	
Team	Year	Apps	Score
Blarney	2019	3	0-09
Blarney	2020	6	4-13
Blarney	Total	9	4-22
Blarney	Year	Cork SAHC	
Blarney	Year	Apps	Score
Blarney	2021	4	0-09
Blarney	2022	3	0-07
Blarney	2023	7	2-14
Blarney	2024	6	1-16
Blarney	2025	0	0-00
Blarney	Total	20	3-46
Career total		29	7-68

=== Inter-county ===
==== Minor and under-20 ====
Team	Year	Munster		All-Ireland		Total	
Team	Year	Apps	Score	Apps	Score	Apps	Score
Cork (MH)	2018	4	1-09	—		4	1-09
Cork (MH)	Total	4	1-09	—		4	1-09
Cork (U20)	Year	Munster		All-Ireland		Total	
Cork (U20)	Year	Apps	Score	Apps	Score	Apps	Score
Cork (U20)	2019	1	0-01	2	0-00	3	0-01
Cork (U20)	2020	2	0-00	1	1-01	3	1-01
Cork (U20)	2021	2	1-08	1	1-05	3	2-13
Cork (U20)	Total	5	1-09	4	2-06	9	3-15

=== Senior ===
As of 19 April 2026

Team	Year	National League			Munster		All-Ireland		Total	
Team	Year	Division	Apps	Score	Apps	Score	Apps	Score	Apps	Score
Cork	2022	Division 1A	1	0-01	0	0-00	0	0-00	1	0-01
Cork	2023	Division 1A	5	2-06	2	0-00	—		7	2-06
Cork	2024	Division 1A	0	0-00	0	0-00	2	0-00	2	0-00
Cork	2025	Division 1A	2	1-04	0	0-00	0	0-00	2	1-04
Cork	2026	Division 1A	1	0-02	1	0-00	0	0-00	2	0-02
Career total			9	3-13	3	0-00	2	0-00	14	3-13

== Honours ==
Christian Brothers College

- Dr O'Callaghan Cup: 2019

Blarney

- Cork Premier Intermediate Hurling Championship: 2020
- Cork Premier 2 Minor Hurling Championship: 2016

Cork

- National Hurling League: 2025
- All-Ireland Under-20 Hurling Championship: 2020, 2021
- Munster Under-20 Hurling Championship : 2020, 2021
