= 2017 Munster Under-25 Reserve Hurling Competition =

- Dates: 4 June 2017 – 18 June 2017
- Teams: 3
- Champions: Limerick (1st title)
- Runners-up: Waterford

Tournament statistics
- Matches played: 2
- Goals scored: 9 (4.5 per match)
- Points scored: 65 (32.5 per match)
- Top scorer(s): Kyle Dillion (1-11)

The 2017 Munster Under-25 Reserve Hurling Competition was the first staging of the Munster Under-25 Reserve Hurling Competition. The competition began on 4 June 2017 and ended on 18 June 2017.

== Teams ==
=== Participants ===
Prior to the opening of the competition, the Cork and Tipperary teams withdrew. This resulted in just three teams remaining, with Waterford receiving a bye to the final.

=== Individual details ===
Team	Colours	Sponsor	Captain	Manager
Clare		Pat O'Donnell	Shane McGrath	John Carmody
Limerick		Sporting Limerick	Thomas Grimes	Pat Donnelly
Waterford		3		Seán Power

== Results ==
Semi-final

4 June 2017 Semi-final	Limerick	4-18 - 0-16	Clare	Semple Stadium, Thurles
14:00	P Ahern 3-0, K Dillion 0-8 (7f), M Mackey 1-2, B Murphy 0-3, D Cotter (f), T Grimes, L Lyons, R Hanley & O O’Reilly 0-1 each.	Report	S McGrath 0-11 (10f), D Conroy 0-2, M O’Neill, K Hehir & M Moloney 0-1 each.	Referee: J Larkin (Cork)

Final

18 June 2017 Final	Limerick	4-12 - 1-19	Waterford	Semple Stadium, Thurles
14:00	O O’Reilly 3-1, K Dillion 1-3 (0-3f), S Flanagan & B Ryan (2f) 0-2 each, J Cagney, C O’Grady, L Lyons & M Mackey 0-1 each.	Report	S Ryan 1-5 (0-2f), J Prendergast & C Curran 0-3 each, A Molumby, E O’Halloran & JP Lucey 0-2 each, B Nolan (f) & R Grey 0-1 each.

== Scoring statistics ==
Top scorers overall

Rank	Player	Team	Tally	Total	Matches	Average
1	Kyle Dillion	Limerick	1-11	14	2	7.00
2	Oisín O'Reilly	Limerick	3-02	11	2	5.50
2	Shane McGrath	Clare	0-11	11	1	11.00

Top scorers in a single game

Rank	Player	Club	Tally	Total	Opposition
1	Shane McGrath	Clare	0-11	11	Limerick
2	Oisín O'Reilly	Limerick	3-01	10	Waterford
3	Paudie Ahern	Limerick	3-00	9	Clare
4	Shane Ryan	Waterford	1-05	8	Limerick
4	Kyle Dillon	Limerick	0-08	8	Clare
