= Munster Under-25 Reserve Hurling Competition =

- Current season or competition: 2017 Munster Under-25 Reserve Hurling Competition
- Irish: Comórtas Iomána Fé-25 na Mumhan
- Founded: 2017
- Region: Munster (GAA)
- No. of teams: 3
- Official website: http://munster.gaa.ie/

The Munster Under-25 Reserve Hurling Competition is an annual championship of hurling for male players under the age of 25 and is organised by the Munster Council of the Gaelic Athletic Association (GAA). The championship will be awarded on an annual basis, with the first tournament beginning in 2017.

The series of games will be played during the summer months, while the Munster final will be played in June. The championship will be played on a straight knock-out basis whereby once a team loses they are eliminated from the series.

Three teams will participate in the competition.

== History ==
Details of the Munster Under-25 Hurling Championship were announced on 18 January 2017 in response to the withdrawal of four of the five teams from the Munster Intermediate Hurling Championship. The absence of an intermediate championship meant that the senior games were left without a curtain-raiser, a role traditionally filled by the intermediate series of games. In spite of withdrawing from the intermediate grade, there was widespread support for the under-25 hurling concept among the Munster counties. This was the sixth championship to be created after the senior, junior, minor, intermediate and under-21 grades.

== Format ==
The Munster Championship is a knockout tournament with pairings drawn at random – there are no seeds.

Each match is played as a single leg. If a match is drawn there is a period of extra time and, if the sides still remain level, a replay is required.

The draws for the Munster Under-25 Championship are the same as the Munster Senior Championship. An open draw is made in which three of the five teams automatically qualify for the semi-final stage of the competition. Two other teams play in a lone quarter-final with the winner joining the other three teams at the semi-final stage. Once a team is defeated they are eliminated from the championship.

Five of the six counties of Munster – Clare, Cork, Limerick, Tipperary and Waterford – participate in the championship.

== List of finals ==
Year	Winners	Score	Runners-up	Score	Venue	Winning Captain(s)
2017	Limerick	4-12	Waterford	1-19	Semple Stadium	Cian Hedderman & Conor Boylan
