= 2024 Cork Senior A Hurling Championship =

Annual hurling competition season

- Dates: 2 August - 20 October 2024
- Teams: 12
- Sponsor: Co-Op Superstores
- Champions: Glen Rovers (1st title); Dean Brosnan (captain); Tomás Mulcahy (manager)
- Runners-up: Blarney; Mark Coleman (captain); Michael Barrett (manager)
- Relegated: Cloyne

Tournament statistics
- Matches played: 24
- Goals scored: 74 (3.08 per match)
- Points scored: 817 (34.04 per match)
- Top scorer(s): Alan Fenton (2-46)

The 2024 Cork Senior A Hurling Championship was the fifth staging of the Cork Senior A Hurling Championship since its establishment by the Cork County Board in 2020. The draw for the group stage placings took place on 14 December 2023. The championship ran from 2 August to 20 October 2024.

The final was played on 20 October 2024 at SuperValu Páirc Uí Chaoimh in Cork, between Glen Rovers and Blarney, in what was their first ever meeting in the final. Glen Rovers won the match by 3–17 to 1–13 to claim their first ever championship title in the grade.

Alan Fenton was the championship's top scorer with 2-46.

== Team changes ==
=== To Championship ===
Relegated from the Cork Premier Senior Hurling Championship

- Glen Rovers

Promoted from the Cork Premier Intermediate Hurling Championship

- Castlelyons

=== From Championship ===
Promoted to the Cork Premier Senior Hurling Championship

- Newcestown

Relegated to the Cork Premier Intermediate Hurling Championship

- Mallow

== Participating teams ==
=== Clubs ===
Team	Location	Colours	Manager(s)	Captain(s)
Ballyhea	Ballyhea	Black and yellow	Aidan Fitzgerald	
Blarney	Blarney	Red and white	Michael Barrett	Mark Coleman
Bride Rovers	Rathcormac	Green, white and gold	Brian Murphy	Shane O'Connor; Brian Roche
Carrigtwohill	Carrigtwohill	Blue and yellow	John Griffin	
Castlelyons	Castlelyons	Green and yellow	Noel Furlong	Colm Spillane
Cloyne	Cloyne	Red and black	Brian Motherway	
Courcey Rovers	Ballinspittle	Red and white	Seán Guiheen	Fergus Lordan
Fermoy	Fermoy	Black and yellow	Don O'Connell	Greg Lardner
Glen Rovers	Blackpool	Green, yellow and black	Tomás Mulcahy	Dean Brosnan
Inniscarra	Inniscarra	Blue and white	Danny O'Donoghue	Conor O'Leary
Killeagh	Killeagh	Green and yellow	Bryan McCarthy	Seán Long; Dinny Walsh
Na Piarsaigh	Fairhill	Black and yellow	Mark Mullins	

== Group A ==
=== Group A table ===
Quarter-finalists Relegation playoff

Team	Matches				Score			Pts
Team	Pld	W	D	L	For	Against	Diff	Pts
Blarney	3	3	0	0	78	53	25	6
Na Piarsaigh	3	2	0	1	64	60	4	4
Courcey Rovers	3	0	1	2	60	67	-7	1
Carrigtwohill	3	0	1	2	55	77	-22	1

=== Group A results ===
2 August 2024 Round 1	Na Piarsaigh	2-16 - 0-19	Courcey Rovers	Brinny Sportsfield
	P Guest 0-6 f, D Connery 0-6 (0-2 f, 0-2 65), R O’Sullivan 1-1, L Sheehan 1-0, S Forde, P O’Rourke, C Hannifin 0-1 each.	Report	R Sweetman 0-11 (0-8 f, 0-1 65), T O’Sullivan 0-4, B Ryan 0-2, O Crowley, S Twomey 0-1 each.	Referee: N O'Neill (Midleton)

3 August 2024 Round 1	Blarney	3-24 - 0-14	Carrigtwohill	Caherlag Grunds
	C Barrett 2-4 (0-1 f), S Barrett 1-6 (0-2 f), P Power 0-4, C McCarthy, D McSweeney, M Coleman 0-2 each, C Hegarty, P Crowley, O Hegarty, P Philpott 0-1 each.	Report	S Walsh 0-4 (0-2 f, 0-2 65), J Oke 0-3, P Hogan 0-2, A Walsh-Barry, J Mulcahy, L Gosnell, D Murnane, C O’Riordan 0-1 each.	Referee: I McCarthy (Bandon)

23 August 2024 Round 2	Carrigtwohill	2-16 - 2-19	Na Piarsaigh	Caherlag Grounds
	S Walsh 1-10 (1-0 pen, 0-6 f), L Gosnell 1-2, J McCarthy, L O’Sullivan, J Mulcahy, S Brennan 0-1 each.	Report	P Guest 1-3 (0-2 f) R O’Sullivan 1-2, D Connery 0-4 (0-2 f, 0-1 65) L Sheehan 0-4, D Lee 0-2, S Forde 0-2, C Hannifin, K Moynihan 0-1 each.

24 August 2024 Round 2	Courcey Rovers	3-13 - 1-23	Blarney	Riverstick Grounds
	R Sweetnam (0-9, 0-8 frees), S Twomey and A O’Donovan (0-1 free) (1-1 each), R O’Callaghan (1-0), O Crowley and T O’Sullivan (0-1 each).	Report	S Barrett (0-11, 0-5 frees), C McCarthy (1-3), P Power (0-3), M Coleman (0-2, 0-1 free), P Philpott, D McSweeney, E Kirby and C Barrett (0-1 each).

7 September 2024 Round 3	Blarney	0-19 - 0-17	Na Piarsaigh	Ovens Grounds
	S Barrett 0-9 (0-4 frees, 0-1 65), E Kirby 0-3, C McCarthy 0-2, C Barrett, P Power, D McSweeney, J O’Keeffe, M Coleman (free) 0-1 each.	Report	P Guest (frees), 0-5, D Connery 0-4 (0-2 frees), R O’Sullivan and K Moynihan 0-2 each, S Forde, E Sheehan, C Hogan and C Hannafin 0-1 each.

7 September 2024 Round 3	Carrigtwohill	2-13 - 0-19	Courcey Rovers	Carrigaline Grounds
	S Walsh (1-6, 1-0 penalty, 0-5 frees, 0-1 65); J Mulcahy (1-1); L Gosnell (0-2, 1 free); A Walsh Barry, P Hogan, J Oke, J McCarthy (0-1 each).	Report	R Sweetnam (0-14, 9 frees, 1 65); S Twomey, A O’Donovan (0-2 each); T O’Sullivan (0-1).

== Group B ==
=== Group B table ===
Semi-finalists Quarter-finalists Relegation playoff

Team	Matches				Score			Pts
Team	Pld	W	D	L	For	Against	Diff	Pts
Bride Rovers	3	3	0	0	76	37	39	6
Castlelyons	3	2	0	1	66	54	12	4
Fermoy	3	1	0	2	50	53	-3	2
Cloyne	3	0	0	3	39	87	-48	0

=== Group B results ===
2 August 2024 Round 1	Fermoy	0-16 - 2-17	Castlelyons	Bride Park
	D Daly 0-8 (0-7 f), M Brennan 0-3, J Carr 0-2, P De Róiste, A Aherne, B O’Sullivan 0-1 each.	Report	A Fenton 0-9 (0-4 f, 0-1 65), E Maye 1-1, K O’Leary 0-3, D Morrisson 1-0, A Spillane, J Kearney 0-2 each.	Referee: C Walsh (Nemo Rangers)

3 August 2024 Round 1	Bride Rovers	2-29 - 0-12	Cloyne	Killeagh Grounds
	R O’Connell 1-4, A Walsh 0-7 (0-5 f), P O’Flynn 0-5, B Roche 0-4, L Roche 1-1, C Ryan, J Ahern 0-2 each, J Peters, S O’Connor, D Cashman, D Barry 0-1 each.	Report	A Walsh 0-7 f, B Walsh 0-2, C Cahill, N Cahill, I Cahill 0-1 each.

23 August 2024 Round 2	Castlelyons	1-10 - 1-21	Bride Rovers	St Catherine's Park
	A Fenton (1-6, 0-5 frees), B Murphy (0-2), D Spillane and A Spillane (0-1 each).	Report	A Walsh (0-11, 0-9 frees), C Tobin (1-1), J Ahern (0-3), C Ryan and P O’Flynn (0-2 each), S O’Connor and D Barry (0-1 each).

25 August 2024 Round 2	Cloyne	1-10 - 3-13	Fermoy	Youghal Grounds
	A Walsh 0-6 f, I Cahill 1-0, C Motherway, B Walsh, N Cahill, M Cahill 0-1 each.	Report	A Aherne 2-0, J Molloy 1-2, J Carr 0-4 (0-1 f, 0-1 65), D Daly 0-3 (0-2 f) P Murphy, D Lardner, C Fitzpatrick, B O’Sullivan 0-1 each.

7 September 2024 Round 3	Bride Rovers	0-17 - 0-12	Fermoy	St Catherine's Park
	A Walsh 0-8 (0-5 f), P O’Flynn 0-3, R O’Connell 0-2, C Ryan, C Hazelwood, D Barry, B Roche 0-1 each.	Report	B O’Sullivan 0-7 (0-6 f), S Coughlan 0-2 f, M Brennan, J O’Brien, P Murphy 0-1 each.

7 September 2024 Round 3	Cloyne	0-14 - 0-30	Castlelyons	Jamesy Kelleher Park
	E Motherway (0-4), B Walsh (0-3), A Walsh (0-2, frees), T O’Regan, C Motherway, C Cahill, N Cahill and I Cahill (0-1 each).	Report	A Fenton (0-11, 0-4 frees, 0-1 ’65), N O’Leary, J Kearney and K O’Leary (0-4 each), L Doocey, A Spillane and C Spillane (0-2 each), B Murphy (0-1 each).

== Group C ==
=== Group C table ===
Semi-finalists Quarter-finalists

Team	Matches				Score			Pts
Team	Pld	W	D	L	For	Against	Diff	Pts
Glen Rovers	3	3	0	0	92	44	48	6
Killeagh	3	1	0	2	71	65	6	2
Ballyhea	3	1	0	2	57	76	-19	2
Inniscarra	3	1	0	2	53	88	-35	2

=== Group C results ===
2 August 2024 Round 1	Ballyhea	3-11 - 1-20	Inniscarra	Grenagh Grounds
	P O’Callaghan 1-5 f, M O’Sullivan 1-2, G Morrissey 1-0, J Hickey, C Cox, T Hanley, E O’Leary 0-1 each.	Report	P Holland 1-4 (0-4 f), J Enright 0-4 (0-1 f, 0-1 65), C Lynch 0-3, M Murphy 0-2, S Sheehan, S O’Mahony, L Ryan, A McCarthy, F O’Leary, D O’Keeffe, M Nagle 0-1 each.	Referee: P Lyons (Bishopstown)

2 August 2024 Round 1	Glen Rovers	3-19 - 0-14	Killeagh	Páirc Séamus de Barra
	S Lynam 1-5 (0-3 f), S Kennefick 1-2, L Horgan 1-0, D Brosnan 0-4, E O’Leary 0-3, M Dooley, B Moylan 0-2 each, R Dunne 0-1.	Report	D McCarthy 0-9 (0-6 f, 0-1 65), D Buckley, E Lane 0-2 each, S Walsh (f), C Leahy 0-1 each.	Referee: S Scanlon (Newcestown)

25 August 2024 Round 2	Killeagh	4-09 - 2-16	Ballyhea	Páirc Bhríde
	Colm Leahy 3-0; R McCarthy 1-0 (1P), D Buckley 0-2, R Long 0-2, Ciaran Leahy 0-1, S Walsh 0-1, E Lane 0-1, D Walsh 0-1, A Leahy 0-1.	Report	J Morrissey 0-6 (1f); J Hickey 0-4 (2f, 1 65), G Morrissey 1-0, M Browne 1-0 (1 P), P O’Callaghan 0-3 (1f), D Copps 0-2, E O’Leary 0-1.

25 August 2024 Round 2	Inniscarra	1-12 - 2-26	Glen Rovers	Blarney Grounds
	J Enright 0-7 (0-6 f, 0-1 65), S O’Mahony 1-1, D O’Keeffe, M Murphy 0-2 each.	Report	S Lynam 1-7 (0-5 f), S Kennifick 0-5, D Brosnan, B Moylan, E O’Leary 0-4 each, R Downey 1-1, R Dunne 0-1 each.

7 September 2024 Round 3	Glen Rovers	3-23 - 0-15	Ballyhea	Kanturk Grounds
	S Kennefick 2-4, S Lynam 1-6 (0-3 f), D Brosnan 0-5, E O’Leary 0-3, E Downey, R Downey, D Dooling, M Dooley, L Horgan 0-1 each.	Report	J Hickey 0-9 (0-8 f), E O’Leary, J Morrissey (f), M O’Sullivan 0-2 each.

7 September 2024 Round 3	KIlleagh	4-24 - 1-12	Inniscarra	Páirc Uí Chonaill
	D McCarthy (1-9, 0-5 frees, 0-1 65), R McCarthy (1-5, 0-2 frees, 0-1 65), Colm Leahy (1-2), D Buckley (1-1), S Smiddy (0-3), S Long (0-2), Ciarán Leahy and R Long (0-1 each).	Report	J Enright (0-6, 0-5 frees), M Nagle (1-0), C Lynch (0-2), S O’Mahony, F O’Leary, D O’Keeffe and M Murphy (0-1 each).

== Knockout stage ==
=== Bracket ===
Quarter-Finals
Blarney (Muskerry)	3-20
Killeagh (Imokilly)	3-16
Castlelyons (Imokilly)	3-23 p
Na Piarsaigh (Seandun)	2-26

Semi-Finals
Bride Rovers (Imokilly)	1-11
Blarney (Muskerry)	2-19
Glen Rovers (Seandun)	3-16
Castlelyons (Imokilly)	1-16

Final
Blarney (Muskerry)	1-13
Glen Rovers (Seandun)	3-17

=== Relegation playoff ===
21 September 2024 Playoff	Cloyne	0-09 - 3-18	Carrigtwohill	Castlemartyr Grounds
	A Walsh (0-6, 4 frees); M Cahill, C Mullins, P O’Sullivan (0-1 each).	Report	S Walsh (2-6, 1-0 penalty, 0-5 frees); S Brennan (1-1); D Murnane (0-4, 1 free); L Gosnell (0-3, 1 free); P O’Sullivan, P Hogan, J Horgan, L O’Sullivan (0-1 each).

=== Quarter-finals ===
21 September 2024 Quarter-final	Castlelyons	3-23 - 2-26; Penalties: 9-8	Na Piarsaigh	Páirc Uí Rinn
	A Fenton 1-11 (1-0 pen, 0-4 f, 0-2 65), K O’Leary 0-5, D Morrison, L Doocey 1-0 each, A Spillane, J Kearney, B Murphy 0-2 each, E Maye 0-1.	Report	P Guest 0-12 (0-8 f, 0-2 65), C Hanifin 1-3, L Sheehan 1-1, R O’Sullivan 0-4, K Forde 0-3, K Moynihan, C Hogan, S Forde 0-1 each.

22 September 2024 Quarter-final	Blarney	3-20 - 3-16	Killeagh	Clonmult Memorial Park
	S Barrett (0-7, 0-5 frees, 0-1 65), P Power (1-2), D McSweeney and C Barrett (1-1 each), E Kirby (0-4), C McCarthy (0-3), P Crowley (0-2).	Report	D McCarthy (0-8, 0-7 frees), R McCarthy (1-2, 0-1 free), Colm Leahy (1-1), S Smiddy (1-0), S Long (0-2), A Walsh, Ciarán Leahy and R Long (0-1 each).

=== Semi-finals ===
6 October 2024 Semi-final	Glen Rovers	3-16 - 1-16	Castlelyons	SuperValu Páirc Uí Chaoimh
	P Horgan 2-9 (1-0 pen, 0-8 f, 0-1 65), E O’Leary 1-1, D Brosnan 0-2, S Kennefick, R Dunne, M Dooley, B Moylan 0-1 each.	Report	A Fenton 0-9 (0-6 f, 0-1 65), A Spillane 1-3, J Kearney, L Doocey, C Spillane, C McCarthy 0-1 each.

6 October 2024 Semi-final	Bride Rovers	1-11 - 2-19	Blarney	SuperValu Páirc Uí Chaoimh
	P O’Flynn 1-3 (0-1f), A Walsh 0-3 (0-1f, 0-1 65), R O’Connell 0-2, B Roche, C Ryan, C Hogan (0-1f) 0-1 each.	Report	S Barrett 0-7 (0-4f), C McCarthy 1-2, P Power 0-4, C Barrett 1-1, E Kirby, M Coleman (0-1f) 0-2 each, P Crowley 0-1.

=== Final ===
20 October 2024 Final	Glen Rovers	3-17 - 1-13	Blarney	SuperValu Páirc Uí Chaoimh
	P Horgan 2-6 (1-4 f), D Brosnan 0-4, L Quilligan 1-1, B Moylan 0-2 (0-1 f), S Kennefick, M Dooley, S Lynam, L Coughlan 0-1 each.	Report	S Barrett 0-4 (0-2 f), M Coleman 0-3 (0-2 f), C McCarthy 1-0, P Power 0-2, C Hegarty, E Kirby, D Hanlon, C Barrett 0-1 each.	Referee: W King (Banteer)

== Championship statistics ==
=== Top scorers ===
Overall

Rank	Player	Club	Tally	Total	Matches	Average
1	Alan Fenton	Castlelyons	2-46	52	5	10.40
2	Shane Barrett	Blarney	1-44	47	6	7.83
3	Seán Walsh	Carrigtwohill	4-26	38	4	9.50
4	Richard Sweetnam	Courcey Rovers	0-34	34	3	11.33
5	Pádraig Guest	Na Piarsaigh	1-26	29	4	7.25
6	Stephen Lynam	Glen Rovers	3-19	28	5	5.60
7	Patrick Horgan	Glen Rovers	4-15	27	2	13.50
8	Dylan McCarthy	Killeagh	0-26	26	4	6.50
9	Simon Kennefick	Glen Rovers	3-13	22	5	4.40
9	Adam Walsh	Bride Rovers	0-22	22	4	5.50

In a single game

Rank	Player	Club	Tally	Total	Opposition
1	Patrick Horgan	Glen Rovers	2-09	15	Castlelyons
2	Alan Fenton	Castlelyons	1-11	14	Na Piarsaigh
2	Richard Sweetnam	Courcey Rovers	0-14	14	Carrigtwohill
4	Seán Walsh	Carrigtwohill	1-10	13	Na Piarsaigh
5	Seán Walsh	Carrigtwohill	2-06	12	Cloyne
5	Patrick Horgan	Glen Rovers	2-06	12	Blarney
5	Dylan McCarthy	Killeagh	1-09	12	Inniscarra
5	Pádraig Guest	Na Piarsaigh	0-12	12	Castlelyons
9	Shane Barrett	Blarney	0-11	11	Courcey Rovers
9	Adam Walsh	Bride Rovers	0-11	11	Castlelyons
9	Alan Fenton	Castlelyons	0-11	11	Cloyne
9	Richard Sweetnam	Courcey Rovers	0-11	11	Na Piarsaigh
