= 2021 All-Ireland Under-20 Hurling Championship =

Championship Details
- Dates: 29 June – 18 August 2021
- Teams: 17

All Ireland Champions
- Winners: Cork (13th win)
- Captain: Cormac O'Brien
- Manager: Pat Ryan

All Ireland Runners-up
- Runners-up: Galway
- Captain: Seán Neary
- Manager: Jeffrey Lynskey

Provincial Champions
- Munster: Cork
- Leinster: Galway
- Ulster: Not Played
- Connacht: Not Played

Championship Statistics
- Matches Played: 16
- Total Goals: 54 (3.37 per game)
- Total Points: 600 (37.50 per game)
- Top Scorer: Liam Dempsey (0-37)

The 2021 All-Ireland Under-20 Hurling Championship was the third staging of the All-Ireland Under-20 Championship and the 58th staging overall of a hurling championship for players between the minor and senior grades. The championship began on 29 June 2021 and ended on 18 August 2021.

The 2021 championship was the first to begin before the previous year's championship had concluded. Cork were the defending champions. The number of participating teams also increased, with Down and Kildare joining the Leinster Championship.

The final was played on 18 August 2021 at Semple Stadium in Thurles, between Cork and Galway, in what was their first meeting in a final in 23 years. Cork won the match by 4-19 to 2-14 to claim their 13th championship title overall and a second title in succession. It was also a 10th successive win for a Munster team in the All-Ireland final.

Kildare's Liam Dempsey was the championship's top scorer with 0-37.

== Results ==
=== Leinster Under-20 Hurling Championship ===
==== Round 1 ====
29 June 2021 Round 1	Down	1-13 - 3-17	Antrim	McKenna Park
	T McGrattan 1-7 (0-5 f), C McMullan 0-2, S Hughes 0-2 (both frees), C Coulter 0-1, A Furlong 0-1	Report	R McMullan 1-6 (0-2f), D Murphy 0-5 (all frees), M McGarry 1-1, S McIntosh 0-3, D McKeogh 1-0, C McQuillan 0-1, D McCloskey 0-1f.	Referee: L Reynolds (Armagh)

29 June 2021 Round 1	Carlow	3-16 - 1-23	Kildare	Netwatch Cullen Park
	J Doyle 0-9 (7 frees), E Hosey 1-2, F O'Toole 1-1, C Kehoe 0-4 (2 frees), C Treacy 1-0.	Report	L Dempsey 0-13 (13 frees); C Treacy 1-0, D Melivlle 0-2, J Higgins 0-1, P Dolan 0-2, C Boran 0-2, M Curtin 0-2, C McCabe 0-1.

29 June 2021 Round 1	Laois	4-33 - 4-27 (aet)	Westmeath	MW Hire O'Moore Park
	J Duggan 3-5, T Keyes 0-8 (four frees), T Cuddy 0-6 (four frees, one 65), G Lynch 1-2, C Byrne 0-5, T Fitzpatrick 0-4 (one free), M Hennessy 0-2, C Burke 0-1.	Report	J Gillen 1-8 (1-2 frees, three 65s), E Cunneen 0-8 (four frees), J Coll 2-2, S Williams 0-4, O McCabe 1-0, M Cunningham 0-1, L Moore 0-2, D Devine 0-1, P Weir-Norris 0-1	Referee: R Fitzsimons (Offaly)

==== Round 2 ====
6 July 2021 Round 2	Laois	4-27 - 0-07	Antrim	Páirc Tailteann
	T Cuddy 0-14 (10f and 0-1’65’); J Duggan 2-4; G Lynch 1-1; C Henry 1-0 (og); T Keyes, E Critchley and C Byrne 0-2 each; P Brennan, N Coss 0-1 each.	Report	N O’Connor 0-2; C Magill, D McCloskey, R McMullan (free), D Delaney and C Bohill 0-1 each.	Referee: K Brady (Louth)

6 July 2021 Round 2	Kildare	0-16 - 1-12	Wexford	St. Conleth's Park
	L Dempsey 0-14 (12fs), D Melville 0-1, C Treacy 0-1.	Report	AJ Redmond 1-7 (1-0 pen, 5fs), É Doyle 0-2; C Molloy 0-1 (f), G Murphy-Butler 0-1, M Byrne 0-1.	Referee: T Gleeson (Dublin)

==== Quarter-finals ====
13 July 2021 Quarter-final	Kilkenny	1-18 - 1-15	Laois	UPMC Nowlan Park
	E Guilfoyle 0-8 (four frees), C Kelly 1-0, L Moore 0-2, C Brennan 0-1, C Kenny 0-2, P Moylan 0-1, B Drennan 0-1, I Byrne 0-2, P McDonald 0-1	Report	T Cuddy 0-5 (three frees, one 65), J Duggan 0-4, D Delaney 1-1 (1-0 pen, one free), C Byrne 0-2, T Fitzpatrick 0-2 (two frees), G Lynch 0-1.	Referee: G McGrath (Wexford)

13 July 2021 Quarter-final	Offaly	2-25 - 1-16	Kildare	Bord na Móna O'Connor Park
	J Screeney 0-12 (11 frees), J Ryan 1-1, DJ McLoughlin 1-3, C Mitchell 0-4, T Dooley 0-2, L Egan 0-1, C Burke 0-1, L Nolan 0-1.	Report	L Dempsey 0-10 (10 frees), D Qualter 1-0, D Melville 0-2, C McCabe 0-2, J Higgins 0-1, M Curtin 0-1.	Referee: C Flynn (Westmeath)

==== Semi-finals ====
20 July 2021 Semi-final	Dublin	2-15 - 1-15	Offaly	Parnell Park
	C Foley 1-6 (0-6f, 1-0 pen), D Purcell 1-5, L Dunne, D Leary, K Lahiff and C Boyle 0-1 each.	Report	J Screeney 0-7 (0-7f), C Mitchell 1-0, C Kiely and R Cleary (0-1f) 0-2 each, DJ McLoughlin, C Burke, J Ryan and N Lyons 0-1 each.

20 July 2021 Semi-final	Galway	1-18 - 1-15	Kilkenny	Bord na Móna O'Connor Park
	D O’Shea 1-7 (0-3f, 0-1 65); S McDonagh (0-2 sidelines) 0-3, J Cooney, S Neary 0-2 each, D Kilcommins, N Collins, P Commins, C Flaherty 0-1 each.	Report	E Guilfoyle 0-7 (0-5f, 0-1 65), T Dunne 1-0, P McDonald, C Kelly, C Kenny, A Tallis (0-1f), S Staunton, B Drennan 0-1 each.	Referee: P Murphy (Carlow)

==== Final ====
27 July 2021 Final	Dublin	0-15 - 2-15	Galway	MW Hire O'Moore Park
	C Foley 0-8 (0-6f, 0-1 ’65), D Purcell 0-2, K Lahiff 0-2, P Dunleavy 0-2, D Leavy 0-1.	Report	D O’Shea 0-7 (0-4f), O Flannery 1-2, S McDonagh 0-3 (0-1 sideline), J Cooney 1-0, J O’Donoghue 0-1, N Collins 0-1, S Neary 0-1.	Referee: R Fitzsimons (Offaly)

=== Munster Under-20 Hurling Championship ===
==== Quarter-finals ====
12 July 2021 Quarter-final	Tipperary	3-24 - 2-21 (aet)	Waterford	Semple Stadium
	P Creedon 1-2, D Ryan 0-5 (2fs), S Hayes, J Leamy 1-1 each, K O’Kelly 0-4, M Hackett, J Devaney 0-3 each, C Fogarty 0-2 (1f), T Cahill, K Maher (f), D Stakelum 0-1 each.	Report	K Mahony 0-7 (5fs, 1 65), M Kiely 1-3, R Halloran 0-5 (2fs, 1 65), S Walsh 1-1, J Burke 0-2, T Flynn, G Fives, P Leevy 0-1 each.	Referee: N Wall (Cork)

12 July 2021 Quarter-final	Kerry	0-15 - 2-20	Clare	Austin Stack Park
	D Moriarty (0-6, 5f); R Walsh (0-5, 3f); D Reen (0-2); N Guerin, C Walsh (0-1 each)	Report	S Punch (1-8, 1-5f); D Cahill (0-7); O O’Donnell (1-1); C Hegarty, W Halpin, A Mungovan, C O’Meara (0-1 each)	Referee: P Carroll (Tipperary)

==== Semi-finals ====
19 July 2021 Semi-final	Limerick	1-27 - 0-17	Clare	LIT Gaelic Grounds
	C O'Neill 0-11 (8f), A English 1-6, A O'Connor 0-4, J Quilty, C Downes (0-2 each), C Coughlan, P Kirby (0-1 each)	Report	S Punch 0-9 (0-8f), C Hegarty 0-3, M Gough, D McMahon (1 free), P Donnellan, O'Donnell, D Cahill (all 0-1 each).	Referee: M Kennedy (Tipperary)

20 July 2021 Semi-final	Tipperary	2-17 - 3-20	Cork	Semple Stadium
	D Ryan 0-9 (0-5f), M Hackett 1-2, K Shelly 1-0, J Campion 0-2, P McGarry, J Leamy, D Stakelum, K O’Kelly 0-1 each.	Report	R Cotter 1-2, D Hogan 1-1, B Hayes, B Cunningham, P Power 0-3 each, L Horgan 1-0, D Flynn (0-2f), S Quirke, J Cahalane 0-2 each, C O’Leary, C Joyce 0-1 each.	Referee: J O'Halloran (Limerick)

==== Final ====
28 July 2021 Final	Cork	1-26 - 1-24	Limerick	Páirc Uí Chaoimh
	D Flynn 0-12 (0-7f), P Power 1-5, B Hayes, R Cotter, J Cahalane, B Cunningham 0-2 each, B O’Sullivan 0-1.	Report	C O’Neill 0-16 (0-15f), D Hegarty 1-3, A English, A O’Connor 0-2 each, B Nix 0-1.	Referee: K Jordan (Tipperary)

=== All-Ireland Under-20 Hurling Championship ===
==== Final ====
18 August 2021 (Note: The final was due to be played on 17 August 2021, but was postponed to 18 August "to ensure conclusion of the process related to the drafting of the statutory instrument required for hosting larger attendances at their fixtures during the COVID-19 pandemic".) Final	Galway	2-14 - 4-19	Cork	Semple Stadium
	D O’Shea 1-7 (7f), A Connaire 1-0, S McDonagh 0-3 (1 sideline), G Lee 0-2, J Cooney 0-1, G Thomas 0-1.	Report	P Power 1-5, D Flynn 1-5 (1-0 pen, 4f), B Hayes 1-2, J Cahalane 1-1, B Cunningham 0-2, D Hogan 0-1, S Quirke 0-1, R Cotter 0-1, L Horgan 0-1.	Referee: J Ryan (Limerick)

== Statistics ==
=== Top scorers ===
Top scorers overall

Rank	Player	County	Tally	Total	Matches	Average
1	Liam Dempsey	Kildare	0-37	37	3	12.33
2	James Duggan	Laois	5-13	28	3	9.33
3	Donal O'Shea	Galway	2-21	27	3	9.00
3	Cathal O'Neill	Limerick	0-27	27	2	13.50
5	Tadhg Cuddy	Laois	0-25	25	3	8.33
6	Darragh Flynn	Cork	1-19	22	3	7.33
7	Shane Punch	Clare	1-17	20	2	11.00
8	Pádraig Power	Cork	2-13	19	3	6.33
8	Jack Screeney	Offaly	0-19	19	2	9.50
10	Ciarán Foley	Dublin	1-14	17	2	8.50

Top scorers in a single game

Rank	Player	Club	Tally	Total	Opposition
1	Cathal O'Neill	Limerick	0-16	16	Cork
2	James Duggan	Laois	3-05	14	Westmeath
2	Liam Dempsey	Kildare	0-14	14	Wexford
2	Tadhg Cuddy	Laois	0-14	14	Antrim
5	Liam Dempsey	Kildare	0-13	13	Carlow
6	Jack Screeney	Offaly	0-12	12	Kildare
6	Darragh Flynn	Cork	0-12	12	Limerick
8	Jack Gillen	Westmeath	1-08	11	Laois
8	Shane Punch	Clare	1-08	11	Kerry
8	Cathal O'Neill	Limerick	0-11	11	Clare

=== Miscellaneous ===
- Cathal O'Neill set a new scoring record for Munster finals when he scored 0-16 against Cork.
