= GAA Minor Star Hurler of the Year =

- Country: (Republic of Ireland) Ireland
- Presented by: Gaelic Athletic Association
- First award: 2017
- Current holder: Xavier Neligan
- Website: Official website

The GAA Minor Star Hurler of the Year is a hurling award presented annually by the sport's governing body, the Gaelic Athletic Association, to the player deemed the best in the All-Ireland Minor Championship. The award, created in 2017, is part of the wider GAA Minor Star Awards. The award is sponsored by Electric Ireland.

== Winners ==
| Year | Player | County | Club |
|---|---|---|---|
| 2017 | Brian Turnbull | Cork | Douglas |
| 2018 | Donal O'Shea | Galway | Salthill-Knocknacarra |
| 2019 | Seán McDonagh | Galway | Mountbellew-Moylough |
| 2020 | Liam Collins | Galway | Cappataggle |
| 2021 | Jack Leahy | Cork | Dungourney |
| 2022 | Adam Screeney | Offaly | Kilcormac/Killoughey |
| 2023 | Eoghan Gunning | Clare | Broadford |
| 2024 | Euan Murray | Tipperary | Thurles Sarsfields |
| 2025 | Cormac Spain | Waterford | Ballygunner |
| 2026 | Xavier Neligan | Limerick | Kilmallock |
