= 2022 Croke Cup =

Irish hurling competition

- Dates: 19 February - 17 March 2022
- Teams: 6
- Sponsor: Masita
- Champions: Ardscoil Rís (1st title); Shane O'Brien (captain); Vince Harrington (captain)
- Runners-up: St Kieran's College; Conor Cody (captain); Brian Dowling (manager)

Tournament statistics
- Matches played: 5
- Goals scored: 11 (2.2 per match)
- Points scored: 145 (29 per match)
- Top scorer(s): Niall O'Farrell (0-22)

The 2022 All-Ireland Post Primary Schools Croke Cup was the 69th staging of the Croke Cup since its establishment by the Gaelic Athletic Association in 1944. It was the first Croke Cup to be completed in three years as the 2020 and 2021 competitions were cancelled due to the COVID-19 pandemic. The competition ran from 19 February to 17 March 2022.

St Kieran's College were the defending champions. Dublin Schools South were the Leinster Championship runners-up, however, as an amalgamated team they were debarred from the provincial stage onwards. Their place in the All-Ireland series was taken by St Kieran's College, who qualified after beating CBS Kilkenny in a playoff.

The final was played on 17 March 2022 at Croke Park in Dublin, between Ardscoil Rís, Limerick and St Kieran's College, in what was their fourth meeting in the final overall and a first meeting in three years. Ardscoil Rís won the match by 1–17 to 0–15 to claim their first ever Croke Cup title.

Niall O'Farrell was the top scorer with 0-22.

== Qualification ==
Province	Team 1	Team 2
Connacht	Presentation College	Gort Community School
Leinster	Good Counsel College	St Kieran's College
Munster	St Joseph's Secondary School	Ardscoil Rís

== Results ==
=== Quarter-finals ===
19 February 2022 Bandlab Quarter-final	Gort Community School	1-10 - 1-13	St Kieran's College	Cappamore Grounds
	K Smyth (1-6, 0-4f, 0-1 65), D Keane (0-3), S Slevin (0-1)	Report	H Shine (1-5, 0-3f), D Murphy, A Ireland-Wall (0-2 each), A Sheridan, B Whitty, L Connellan, J Fitzpatrick (0-1 each)	Referee: J O'Halloran

28 February 2022 Quarter-final	Presentation College	1-12 - 1-18	Ardscoil Rís	Dangan Sportsground
	A Niland 1-4 (0-1f), G Lee 0-6 (0-4f, 0-2 ’65), T Leen 0-1, D McCartin 0-1.	Report	N O’Farrell 0-9 (0-7f, 0-1 ’65), D Kennedy 1-2, S O’Brien 0-4, J Golden 0-2, R O’Byrne 0-1.	Referee: R Fitzsimons (Offaly)

=== Semi-finals ===
5 March 2022 Semi-final	Ardscoil Rís	2-17 - 0-16	Good Counsel College	Canon Hayes Park
	S O’Brien 1-8 (5f); N O’Farrell 0-5 (2 f, 1 ‘65’); D Kenendy 1-2; J Golden, C Scully 0-1 each.	Report	J Redmond 0-11 (10f); C Byrne, M Murphy, B Reid, P McDonald, CM Foley (free) 0-1 each.	Referee: L Gordon (Galway)

5 March 2022 Semi-final	St Kieran's College	3-16 - 1-11	St Joseph's Secondary School	MacDonagh Park
	H Shine (1-7, 5f, 2 ’65), D Murphy (1-3), L Connellan (1-0), B Whitty (0-2), J Carroll (0-1), P Lennon (0-1), J Fitzpatrick (0-1), T Dunne (0-1).	Report	S Withycombe (1-7f), O O’Connor (0-1), C Cleary (0-1), D Keogh (0-1), T Leydon (0-1f)	Referee: F Horgan (Tipperary)

=== Final ===
17 March 2022 Final	Ardscoil Rís	1-17 - 0-15	St Kieran's College	Croke Park
	N O'Farrell (0-8, 4 frees, 1 '65); D Kennedy (1-3); S O'Brien (0-3); R O'Byrne, J Golden, D Lynch (0-1 each).	Report	B Whitty (1 free, 1 '65), J Fitzpatrick (1 free) (0-4 each); H Shine (0-3, 1 free); P Langton, J Carroll, D Murphy, P Naddy (0-1 each).	Referee: L Gordon (Galway)

== Statistics ==
=== Top scorers ===
Overall

Rank	Player	Club	Tally	Total	Matches	Average
1	Niall O'Farrell	Ardscoil Rís	0-22	22	3	7.33
2	Harry Shine	St Kieran's College	2-15	21	3	7.00
3	Shane O'Brien	Ardscoil Rís	1-15	18	3	6.00
4	David Kennedy	Ardscoil Rís	3-07	16	3	5.33
5	Jack Redmond	Good Counsel College	0-11	11	1	11.00
6	Seán Withycombe	St Joseph's SS	1-07	10	1	10.00
7	Keith Smyth	Gort Community School	1-06	9	1	9.00
7	Donagh Murphy	St Kieran's College	1-06	9	3	3.00
9	Aaron Niland	Presentation College	1-04	7	1	7.00
9	Ben Whitty	St Kieran's College	0-07	7	3	2.33

In a single game

Rank	Player	Club	Tally	Total	Opposition
1	Shane O'Brien	Ardscoil Rís	1-08	11	Good Counsel College
1	Jack Redmond	Good Counsel College	0-11	11	Ardscoil Rís
3	Harry Shine	St Kieran's College	1-07	10	St Joseph's SS
3	Seán Withycombe	St Joseph's SS	1-07	10	St Kieran's College
5	Keith Smyth	Gort Community School	1-06	9	St Kieran's College
5	Niall O'Farrell	Ardscoil Rís	0-09	9	Presentation College
7	Harry Shine	St Kieran's College	1-05	8	Gort Community School
7	Niall O'Farrell	Ardscoil Rís	0-08	8	St Kieran's College
9	Aaron Niland	Presentation College	1-04	7	Ardscoil Rís
10	Donagh Murphy	St Kieran's College	1-03	6	St Joseph's SS
10	David Kennedy	Ardscoil Rís	1-03	6	St Kieran's College
10	Gavin Lee	Presentation College	0-06	6	Ardscoil Rís
