= 2023 Croke Cup =

Irish hurling competition

- Dates: 18 February - 17 March 2023
- Teams: 6
- Sponsor: Masita
- Champions: St Kieran's College (24th title); Harry Shine (captain); Killian Doyle (captain)
- Runners-up: Presentation College, Athenry; Tiarnán Leen (captain)

Tournament statistics
- Matches played: 5
- Goals scored: 14 (2.8 per match)
- Points scored: 148 (29.6 per match)
- Top scorer(s): Harry Shine (2-09); Aaron Niland (0-15)

The 2023 All-Ireland Post Primary Schools Croke Cup was the 70th staging of the Croke Cup since its establishment by the Gaelic Athletic Association in 1944. The competition ran from 18 February to 17 March 2023.

Ardscoil Rís, Limerick were the defending champions, however, they were beaten by Cashel Community School at the semi-final stage of Harty Cup. Offaly Schools won the Leinster Championship, however, as an amalgamated team they were debarred from the provincial stage onwards. Their place in the All-Ireland series was taken by Coláiste Eoin, who qualified after beating Good Counsel College in a playoff.

The final was played on 17 March 2023 at Croke Park in Dublin, between St Kieran's College and Presentation College, Athenry, in what was their third meeting in the final overall and a first meeting in four years. St Kieran's College won the match by 3–13 to 0–12 to claim their 24th Croke Cup title overall and a first title in four years.

Harry Shine (2-09) and Aaron Niland (0-15) were the joint-top scorers.

== Qualification ==
Province	Team 1	Team 2
Connacht	Presentation College	St. Raphael's College
Leinster	St Kieran's College	Coláiste Eoin
Munster	Cashel Community School	Thurles CBS

== Results ==
=== Quarter-finals ===
18 February 2023 Quarter-final	St Kieran's College	2-28 - 0-13	St. Raphael's College	MacDonagh Park
	A McEvoy 0-12 (0-7f), D Murphy 1-2, H Shine 1-1 (1-0 pen), E McDermott 0-4, N Shortall 0-2, E Dunne 0-2, K Doyle 0-1, T McPhillips 0-1, R Glynn 0-1, A Ireland Wall 0-1, M Kelleher 0-1.	Report	L Connaire 0-4 (0-3f), B Feeney 0-2, P Mac Carthaigh 0-2, E Mulleady 0-2, S Concannon 0-1, S Murray 0-1f, D Mac Carthaigh 0-1.	Referee: E Stapleton (Limerick)

18 February 2023 Quarter-final	Thurles CBS	2-17 - 2-14	Coláiste Eoin	Ratheniska Grounds
	T Maher (0-6, 0-3f), R Ryan (1-2, 0-1f), B Flanagan 1-1, D Kelly 0-3, J Egan 0-2, Ro Stapleton, J Doyle, L Doyle all 0-1 each.	Report	D Purséil 1-4, D Ó Dulaing 0-5f, J Ó Conaire 1-0, B Ó Cionnaith 0-2, R Ó Conchubair, C Ó Donnabhrain, G Ó Fiannabhra all 0-1 each.	Referee: P Phelan (Laois)

=== Semi-finals ===
4 March 2023 Semi-final	Presentation College, Athenry	0-15 - 0-14	Thurles CBS	St Brendan's Park
	A Niland 0-9 (0-8f), T Leen 0-4, M Fallon 0-1, M Tarpey 0-1.	Report	R Ryan 0-4 (0-2f), T Maher 0-3 (0-2f), D Kelly 0-2, J Doyle 0-1, J Maher 0-1, R Stapleton 0-1, J Egan 0-1, L Doyle 0-1.	Referee: J Murphy (Limerick)

4 March 2023 Semi-final	St Kieran's College	3-13 - 2-09	Cashel Community School	St Brendan's Park
	H Shine 1-6 (0-5f), T Dunne 1-2, D Murphy 1-0, Jeff Neary 0-1, Pádraig Naddy 0-1, A McEvoy 0-1, K Corcoran 0-1, A Ireland Wall 0-1.	Report	R Connolly 1-6 (0-4f), B Power 1-3.	Referee: N Malone (Clare)

=== Final ===
17 March 2023 Final	St Kieran's College	3-13 - 0-12	Presentation College, Athenry	Croke Park
	A Ireland Wall 1-2, T Dunne 1-1, R Glynn 0-4, D Murphy 1-0, H Shine 0-2(1 f), B Whitty 0-1 (65), B Murphy, P Naddy, K Doyle 0-1.	Report	A Niland 0-6, (5 f, 1 65), T Leen 0-2, G Fahy, M Tarpey, J Rabbitte, S Monaghan 0-1.	Referee: J Murphy (Limerick)

== Statistics ==
=== Top scorers ===
Overall

Rank	Player	Club	Tally	Total	Matches	Average
1	Harry Shine	St Kieran's College	2-09	15	3	5.00
1	Aaron Niland	Presentation College	0-15	15	2	7.50
3	Aaron McEvoy	St Kieran's College	0-13	13	3	4.33
4	Donagh Murphy	St Kieran's College	3-02	11	3	3.66
4	Ted Dunne	St Kieran's College	2-05	11	3	3.66
6	Ronan Connolly	Cashel CS	1-06	9	1	9.00
6	Robbie Ryan	Thurles CBS	1-06	9	2	4.50
6	Tommy Maher	Thurles CBS	0-09	9	2	4.50
9	David Purséil	Coláiste Eoin	1-04	7	1	7.00
9	Anthony Ireland-Wall	St Kieran's College	1-04	7	3	2.33

In a single game

Rank	Player	Club	Tally	Total	Opposition
1	Aaron McEvoy	St Kieran's College	0-12	12	St Raphael's College
2	Harry Shine	St Kieran's College	1-06	9	Cashel CS
2	Ronan Connolly	Cashel CS	1-06	9	St Kieran's College
2	Aaron Niland	Presentation College	0-09	9	Thurles CBS
5	David Purséil	Coláiste Eoin	1-04	7	Thurles CBS
6	Bobby Power	Cashel CS	1-03	6	St Kieran's College
6	Aaron Niland	Presentation College	0-06	6	St Kieran's College
6	Tommy Maher	Thurles CBS	0-06	6	Coláiste Eoin
9	Donagh Murphy	St Kieran's College	1-02	5	St Raphael's College
9	Robbie Ryan	Thurles CBS	1-02	5	Coláiste Eoin
9	Ted Dunne	St Kieran's College	1-02	5	Cashel CS
9	Anthony Ireland-Wall	St Kieran's College	1-02	5	Presentation College
9	Diarmaid Ó Dúlaing	Coláiste Eoin	0-05	5	Thurles CBS
