= Ronan Kilroy =

Irish hurler

Personal information
- Native name: Rónán Mac Giolla Ráith (Irish)
- Born: 2006 (age 19–20) Ennis, County Clare, Ireland
- Occupation: Student

Sport
- Sport: Hurling
- Position: Right corner-back
Club
- Years: Club
- 2024-present: The Banner
Club titles
- Clare titles: 0
College
- Years: College
- 2025-present: University of Limerick
College titles
- Fitzgibbon titles: 0
Inter-county
- Years: County
- 2026-: Clare
Inter-county titles
- Munster titles: 0
- All-Irelands: 0
- NHL: 0
- All Stars: 0

Ronan Kilroy (born 2006) is an Irish hurler. At club level he plays with the Banner and at inter-county level with the Clare senior hurling team.

== Career ==
Kilroy first played hurling at juvenile and underage levels with the Banner club before later progressing to adult level. He was part of the club's Clare JAHC-winning team in 2025. Kilroy also played hurling during his time as a student in St Flannan's College, including the Dr Harty Cup competition. He won an All-Ireland Freshers HC title with University of Limerick in 2026.

At inter-county level, Kilroy first played for Clare at minor level. He was wing-forward on the team that won the Munster MHC title in 2023, before later claiming an All-Ireland MHC medal after a 2–22 to 4–11 win over Galway in the 2023 All-Ireland MHC final. Kilroy subsequently progressed to the under-20 team.

Kilroy made his senior team debut in Clare's National Hurling League game against Down in February 2026.

== Career statistics ==
As of 8 March 2026

Team	Year	National League			Munster		All-Ireland		Total	
Team	Year	Division	Apps	Score	Apps	Score	Apps	Score	Apps	Score
Clare	2026	Division 1B	3	0-01	0	0-00	0	0-00	3	0-01
Career total			3	0-01	0	0-00	0	0-00	3	0-01

== Honours ==
The Banner

- Clare Junior A Hurling Championship: 2025

Clare

- All-Ireland Under-20 Hurling Championship: 2026
- Munster Under-20 Hurling Championship: 2026
- All-Ireland Minor Hurling Championship: 2023
- Munster Minor Hurling Championship: 2023
