= Diarmuid Healy =

Irish hurler (born 2004)

Personal information
- Native name: Diarmuid Ó hÉaluighthe (Irish)
- Nickname: Dudsy
- Born: 2004 (age 21–22) Lisgoold, County Cork, Ireland
- Occupation: Student
- Height: 6 ft 4 in (193 cm)

Sport
- Sport: Hurling
- Position: Right wing-forward
Clubs*
| Years | Club | Apps (scores) |
| 2022– 2022– | Lisgoold → Imokilly | 11 (3–23) |
Club titles
- Cork titles: 1
College
- Years: College
- 2023-present: MTU Cork
College titles
- Fitzgibbon titles: 0
Inter-county
| Years | County | Apps (scores) |
| 2025– | Cork | 4 (0-05) |
Inter-county titles
- Munster titles: 1
- All-Irelands: 0
- NHL: 1
- All Stars: 0
- * club appearances and scores correct as of 22:45, 12 August 2025.

Diarmuid Healy (born 2004) is an Irish hurler. At club level he plays with Lisgoold, divisional side Imokilly and at inter-county level with the Cork senior hurling team.

== Early life ==
Born and raised in Lisgoold, County Cork, Healy played hurling at all levels as a student at Midleton CBS. He progressed through the various competitions, including the Dean Ryan Cup, and eventually lined out for the senior team in the Dr Harty Cup. Healy later studied at Munster Technological University Cork and was added to their Fitzgibbon Cup panel in 2025.

== Club career ==
Healy began his club career at juvenile and underage levels as a dual player with the Lisgoold club, before progressing to adult level in 2022. He claimed his first silverware as a Gaelic footballer in 2023 when Lisgoold beat Carrignavar by 2–09 to 0–10 to win the East Cork JAFC for the very first time. Healy won a Cork IAHC medal in November 2024 after scoring four points in the 2–18 to 2–13 replay defeat of Erin's Own.

Healy was just 18-years-old when he also earned a call-up to the Imokilly divisional team in 2022. He won a Cork PSHC medal in October 2024 after lining out at centre-forward in Imokilly's 1–23 to 0–17 win over Sarsfields in the final.

== Inter-county career ==
Healy first played for Cork as a member of the minor team during their unsuccessful Munster MHC campaign in 2020. He was still eligible for the minor grade the following year and scored four points from wing-forward in the 1–23 to 0–12 defeat of Galway in the 2021 All-Ireland MHC final. Healy immediately progressed to the under-20 team and added an All-Ireland U20HC title to his collection after lining out at wing-forward in the 2–22 to 3–13 defeat of Offaly in the 2023 All-Ireland U20 final.

Following the completion of his three-year tenure with the under-20 team, Healy was included on Cork's senior panel in February 2025. He first appeared for the team when he was listed amongst the substitutes for Cork's group stage game against Limerick during the 2025 National Hurling League. Healy ended the league campaign with a winners' medal after coming on as a substitute in Cork's win over Tipperary in the final. He later claimed a Munster SHC medal after lining out at wing-forward in Cork's penalty shootout defeat of Limerick in the 2025 Munster final.

== Career statistics ==
As of 25 January 2026

| Team | Year | National League | | | Munster | | All-Ireland | | Total | |
| Team | Year | Division | Apps | Score | Apps | Score | Apps | Score | Apps | Score |
|---|---|---|---|---|---|---|---|---|---|---|
| Cork | 2025 | Division 1A | 4 | 1-08 | 3 | 0-04 | 2 | 0-04 | 9 | 1-16 |
| Cork | 2026 | Division 1A | 1 | 0-04 | 0 | 0-00 | 0 | 0-00 | 1 | 0-04 |
| Career total | | | 5 | 1-12 | 3 | 0-04 | 2 | 0-04 | 19 | 1-20 |

== Honours ==
Lisgoold

- Cork Intermediate A Hurling Championship: 2024
- East Cork Junior A Football Championship: 2023

Imokilly

- Cork Premier Senior Hurling Championship: 2024

Cork

- Munster Senior Hurling Championship: 2025
- National Hurling League: 2025
- All-Ireland Under-20 Hurling Championship: 2023
- Munster Under-20 Hurling Championship: 2023
- All-Ireland Minor Hurling Championship: 2021
- Munster Minor Hurling Championship: 2021
