= Mark Sheedy =

Irish hurler

Personal information
- Native name: Marc Ó Síoda (Irish)
- Born: 2006 (age 19–20) Sixmilebridge, County Clare, Ireland
- Occupation: ESB Networks employee

Sport
- Sport: Hurling
- Position: Goalkeeper
Club
- Years: Club
- 2024-present: Sixmilebridge
Club titles
- Clare titles: 0
Inter-county
- Years: County
- 2026-: Clare
Inter-county titles
- Munster titles: 0
- All-Irelands: 0
- NHL: 0
- All Stars: 0

Mark Sheedy (born 2006) is an Irish hurler. At club level he plays with Sixmilebridge and at inter-county level with the Clare senior hurling team.

== Career ==
Sheedy first played hurling at juvenile and underage levels with the Sixmilebridge club before later progressing to adult level. He also played hurling and Gaelic football during his time as a student at St Caimin's Community School in Shannon.

At inter-county level, Sheedy first played for Clare during a two-year stint at minor level. He was goalkeeper on the team that won the Munster MHC title in 2023, before later claiming an All-Ireland MHC medal after a 2–22 to 4–11 win over Galway in the 2023 All-Ireland MHC final. Sheedy subsequently progressed to the under-20 team.

Sheedy made his senior team debut in Clare's National Hurling League game against Wexford in March 2026.

== Career statistics ==
As of 8 March 2026

Team	Year	National League			Munster		All-Ireland		Total	
Team	Year	Division	Apps	Score	Apps	Score	Apps	Score	Apps	Score
Clare	2026	Division 1B	1	0-00	0	0-00	0	0-00	1	0-00
Career total			1	0-00	0	0-00	0	0-00	1	0-00

== Honours ==
Clare

- All-Ireland Minor Hurling Championship: 2023
- Munster Minor Hurling Championship: 2023
- Munster u20 Hurling Championship 2026
- All Ireland u20 Hurling Championship 2026
- Clare Young Person of the Year 2026
