= 2021–22 Harty Cup =

Hurling tournament

2021–22 Dr Harty Cup
- Dates: 8 November 2021 – 5 February 2022
- Teams: 13
- Sponsor: TUS
- Champions: St Joseph's Secondary School (1st title); Ronan O'Connor (captain); Terence Fahy (manager)
- Runners-up: Ardscoil Rís; Shane O'Brien (captain); Vince Harrington (captain); Niall Moran (manager)

Tournament statistics
- Matches played: 18
- Goals scored: 40 (2.22 per match)
- Points scored: 565 (31.39 per match)
- Top scorer(s): Seán Withycombe

The 2021–22 Harty Cup was the 101st staging of the Harty Cup since its establishment in hurling by the Munster Council of Gaelic Athletic Association in 1918. The competition contested from 8 November 2021 to 5 February 2022.

The 2021–22 Dr Harty Cup adopted a change in format. Prior to 2021, the competition began with group stage, the knockout stage commencing after Christmas. The new format saw six first-round games, with three winners moving forward to the quarter-finals while the other three winners, six losers and Gaelcholáiste Mhuire contesting five second-round ties to determine the other last-eight teams.

St Flannan's College unsuccessfully defended its title in round 2 against Cashel Community School.

St Joseph's Secondary School won the Harty Cup final on 5 February 2022 at TUS Gaelic Grounds, 1–17 to 1–14, in Limerick, against Ardscoil Rís, in what was St Joseph's first ever meeting in a final and their first ever Harty Cup title.

St Joseph's Secondary School's Seán Withycombe was the top scorer.

== Results ==
=== Round 1 ===
8 November 2021 Round 1	Ardscoil Rís	0-18 - 0-16	Nenagh CBS	O'Garney Park
	N O’Farrell (0-9, 7f), D Casey and S O’Brien (0-3), R O’Byrne, M Galvin and O O’Farrell (0-1).	Report	D McCarthy (0-9, 7f, 1 ‘65), S Kenneally (0-3, 1 f), A Hall (0-2), and M Ryan (0-2, 2 f).

10 November 2021 Round 1	Thurles CBS	2-20 - 1-21	St Flannan's College	Littleton Grounds
		Report

10 November 2021 Round 1	De La Salle College Waterford	0-20 - 0-18	St Joseph's Secondary School	Canon Hayes Park
		Report

10 November 2021 Round 1	Christian Brothers College, Cork	1-20 - 1-14	Midleton CBS	Clonmult Memorial Park
	E Kirby 1-4, D Cremin, E O’Leary (0-4f) 0-6 each, D Burke 0-2, P Linehan, J Dwyer 0-1 each.	Report	J Leahy 0-10 (0-5f, 0-1 65), T Wilk 1-0, D Joyce, D McCarthy, G Walsh Wallace, D Healy (0-1f) 0-1 each.

10 November 2021 Round 1	Cashel Community School	2-22 - 1-14	Our Lady's Secondary School	Leahy Park
		Report

12 November 2021 Round 1	St Colman's College	2-20 - 0-08	Blackwater Community School	Castle Grounds
	J Magner 1-7 (0-3 f, 0-1 65), B Nodwell 1-1, E Cashman 0-4, B Nyhan 0-3, H Draper (sideline), D Barry, M O'Driscoll, B Lehane, D Cashman 0-1 each.	Report	A Mansfield 0-3 (0-2 f, 0-1 65), C Murphy 0-2, J Power (f), B O'Sullivan, C Rooney 0-1 each.

=== Round 2 ===
24 November 2021 Round 2	Cashel Community School	0-16 - 1-12	St Flannan's College	Leahy Park
		Report

24 November 2021 Round 2	Thurles CBS	3-17 - 0-11	Our Lady's Secondary School	Littleton Grounds
	J Maher (2-0), C McCormack (0-6, 0-5f); J Leamy (1-1), D Stakelum (0-3), J Egan (0-2), J Lahart (0-2), S Walsh (0-1), J Caesar (0-1f), T Maher (0-1).	Report	P McCormack (0-8f), J Ormonde (0-3).

24 November 2021 Round 2	Nenagh CBS	2-14 -1-13	Gaelcholaiste Mhuire AG	MacDonagh Park
		Report

24 November 2021 Round 2	Blackwater Community School	0-03 - 2-26	Midleton CBS	Castle Grounds
	A Mansfield (0-3, 2fs).	Report	J Ahern, J Leahy (2fs, 1 65), D Healy (2fs) (0-6 each); C Leahy, J Fogarty (1-0 each); D Joseph (0-3); T Wilk (0-2); D Murnane, T Roche, C O'Leary (0-1 each).

24 November 2021 Round 2	St Colman's College	1-16 - 2-16 (aet)	St Joseph's Secondary School	Páirc Mac Gearailt
	J Magner (0-12, 0-9 frees, 0-2 65s), B Nodwell (1-0), S Walsh (free), B Lehane, S O’Donoghue, G O’Brien (0-1 each).	Report	S Withycombe (1-9 frees), F Hickey (1-2), D Keogh (0-4 frees), O O’Connor (0-1).

=== Quarter-finals ===
8 January 2022 Quarter-final	St Joseph's Secondary School	1-17 - 1-15	Christian Brothers College, Cork	FitzGerald Park
	S Withycombe (0-14, 12f, 1 ‘65); D Ryan (1-0); F Hickey, R O’Connor, D Keogh (0-1 each).	Report	E O’Leary (0-11, 10f); D Burke (1-2); E Kirby, D Cremin (0-1 each).

8 January 2022 Quarter-final	Ardscoil Rís	1-14 - 0-12	Midleton CBS	Mallow GAA Complex
	N O'Farrell 0-10 (0-6 f, 0-2 65), O O'Farrell 1-1, R O'Byrne 0-2, S O'Brien 0-1.	Report	J Leahy 0-7 (0-6 f), D Healy 0-4, D Murnane 0-1.

8 January 2022 Quarter-final	Thurles CBS	3-16 - 0-13	Cashel Community School	Boherlahen Grounds
	J Leamy (1-8, 0-6fs), J Egan (1-2), B Flanagan (1-0), D Stakelum (0-2), C McCormack, J Maher, M Fitzpatrick, E Meagher (0-1 each);	Report	R Connolly (0-8,6fs), B Currivan (0-2,2fs), D McGrath, A Walsh, C Quinn (0-1 each);

12 January 2022 Quarter-final	De La Salle College Waterford	4-13 - 0-16	Nenagh CBS	Canon Hayes Park
	P Fitzgerald (1-11, 7f, 1sl); S Pender (1-1); C Tobin, L Horgan (1-0 each); J Twomey (0-1).	Report	D McCarthy (0-12, 11f, ’65); S Kenneally (0-2); E Grace (sl), M Ryan (0-1 each).

=== Semi-finals ===
22 January 2022 Semi-final	Ardscoil Rís	4-18 - 1-12	Thurles CBS	MacDonagh Park
	S O Brien (2-6), N O’Farrell (1-2), D Kennedy (1-1), J J Carey (0-3), O O’Farrell (0-2), R O’Byrne, C Scully, D Lynch, P O Neill (0-1 each).	Report	J Egan (1-2), J Leamy (0-5), P Ryan, J Lahart, T Lambe, D Stakelum, B Flanagan (0-1 each).

22 January 2022 Semi-final	St Joseph's Secondary School	0-20 - 1-13	De La Salle College Waterford	Mallow GAA Complex
	S Withycombe (0-15, 0-12 frees), F Hickey (0-2), O Clune, R O’Connor, C Cleary (0-1 each).	Report	P Fitzgerald (0-11, 0-9 frees), J Twomey (1-1), C Cantwell (0-1).

=== Final ===
5 February 2022 Final	St Joseph's Secondary School	1-17 - 1-14	Ardscoil Rís	TUS Gaelic Grounds
	S Withycombe (0-10, 6f, 3 ’65), C Cleary (0-3), D Keogh (0-2), R O’Connor (0-1), O Clune (0-1).	Report	N O’Farrell (07, 2f, 2 ’65), R O’Byrne (0-2), S O’Brien (0-2), D Lynch (0-2), JJ Carey (0-1).	Referee: M Kennedy (Tipperary)
