= Jamie Moylan =

Irish hurler

Personal information
- Native name: Séamie Ó Maoláin (Irish)
- Born: 2006 (age 19–20) Cratloe, County Clare, Ireland
- Occupation: Student

Sport
- Sport: Hurling
- Position: Left wing-back
Club
- Years: Club
- 2024-present: Cratloe
Club titles
- Clare titles: 0
College
- Years: College
- University of Limerick
College titles
- Fitzgibbon titles: 0
Inter-county
- Years: County
- 2026-: Clare
Inter-county titles
- Munster titles: 0
- All-Irelands: 0
- NHL: 0
- All Stars: 0

Jamie Moylan (born 2006) is an Irish hurler. At club level he plays with Cratloe and at inter-county level with the Clare senior hurling team.

== Career ==
Moylan first played hurling at juvenile and underage levels with the Cratloe club before later progressing to adult level. He also played hurling during his time as a student at Ardscoil Rís in Limerick and was a Dr Harty Cup runners-up in 2024. Moylan later won a Freshers 1 Hurling League title with University of Limerick.

At inter-county level, Moylan first played for Clare at minor level. He was at wing-back on the team that won the Munster MHC title in 2023, before later claiming an All-Ireland MHC medal after a 2–22 to 4–11 win over Galway in the 2023 All-Ireland MHC final. Moylan subsequently progressed to the under-20 team.

Moylan made his senior team debut in Clare's National Hurling League game against Carlow in February 2026.

== Career statistics ==
As of 8 March 2026

Team	Year	National League			Munster		All-Ireland		Total	
Team	Year	Division	Apps	Score	Apps	Score	Apps	Score	Apps	Score
Clare	2026	Division 1B	1	0-00	0	0-00	0	0-00	1	0-00
Career total			1	0-00	0	0-00	0	0-00	1	0-00

== Honours ==
University of Limerick

- Higher Education Freshers 1 Hurling League: 2024

Clare

- All-Ireland Minor Hurling Championship: 2023
- Munster Minor Hurling Championship: 2023
