= Rory Burke =

Rory Burke may refer to:

- Rory Burke (rugby union) (1994–2024), Irish rugby union player
- Rory Burke (hurler) (born 2005), Irish hurler
