= 2021 All-Ireland Minor Hurling Championship =

All-Ireland Minor Hurling Championship 2021
Championship Details
- Dates: 30 June - 21 August 2021
- Teams: 18

All Ireland Champions
- Winners: Cork (19th win)
- Captain: Ben O'Connor; James Dwyer
- Manager: Noel Furlong

All Ireland Runners-up
- Runners-up: Galway
- Captain: Diarmuid Davoren
- Manager: Brian Hanley

Provincial Champions
- Munster: Cork
- Leinster: Kilkenny
- Ulster: Not Played
- Connacht: Not Played

Championship Statistics
- Matches Played: 15
- Total Goals: 50 (3.33 per game)
- Total Points: 493 (32.86 per game)
- Top Scorer: Jack Leahy (4-41)

The 2021 All-Ireland Minor Hurling Championship was the 91st staging of the All-Ireland Minor Hurling Championship since its establishment by the Gaelic Athletic Association in 1928. The championship began on 30 June 2021 and ended on 21 August 2021.

The 2021 championship was the first in over 90 years to begin before the previous year's championship had concluded. The number of participating teams also increased, with Down and Meath joining the Leinster Championship. Galway entered the championship as the defending champions in search of a fifth successive title.

The final, the first to be played at Semple Stadium in Thurles in over 30 years, was played on 21 August 2021 between Cork and Galway, in what was their first meeting in a final in four years. Cork won the match by 1-23 to 0-12 to claim their 19th championship title overall and their first title since 2001.

Cork's Jack Leahy was the championship's top scorer with 4-41.

== Results ==
=== Leinster Minor Hurling Championship ===
==== Leinster round 1 ====
30 June 2021 Round 1	Down	2-11 - 2-17	Antrim	St. Patrick's Park
	M Dorrian (0-4), P Smyth (1-0, pen); A Rogan (1-0), D Mallon (0-3, 2f, 1 65), F Gilmore (0-2), F Turpin (0-1f), O Birt (0-1),	Report	J McCloskey (2-2), N McGarel (0-6, 1f 1 65), R McCollum (0-2), A McGarry (0-2), J McLaughlin (0-2), R McCormick (0-1), D McMullan (0-1f), D Kearney (0-1).	Referee: A McAleer (Donegal)

30 June 2021 Round 1	Carlow	1-09 - 2-23	Kildare	Netwatch Cullen Park
	D Murphy 0-7 (4fs), E Doyle 1-0, J Nolan 0-1, J Doyle 0-1.	Report	F Maher 0-15 (9fs), K Harrington 1-0, J Dolan 1-0, N Dolan 0-3, C Boran 0-2; S Kelleher 0-2, A Tobin 0-1 (f);	Referee: P Dunne (Laois)

1 July 2021 Round 1	Westmeath	0-18 - 2-16	Meath	TEG Cusack Park
	D Williams 0-9 frees; D O'Reilly 0-4; P Murphy 0-2; R Holding 0-2; P Clarke 0-1.	Report	J Ennis 1-11 1-8 frees, one '65'; D Horan 1-0; M Horan 0-2; D Rohan 0-1; S Corbett 0-1; T Shine 0-1.

==== Leinster round 2 ====
7 July 2021 Round 2	Meath	w/o - scr.	Antrim	Páirc Naomh Bríd
		Report

7 July 2021 Round 2	Kildare	2-16 - 0-15	Laois	St. Conleth's Park
	F Maher 0-9 (five frees, one sideline), J Dolan 2-0, A Tobin 0-3 (two frees), N Dolan 0-3, S Kelleher 0-1.	Report	C Byrne 0-5 (three frees), E Cuddy 0-5 (four frees), B Duggan 0-2, J Quinlan 0-1, J Breen 0-1, A Phelan 0-1.	Referee: A Kinahan (Offaly)

==== Leinster quarter-finals ====
14 July 2021 Quarter-final	Kildare	3-10 - 2-18	Wexford	St. Conleth's Park
	F Maher 0-5 (4 frees), A Tobin 1-2, S Kelleher 1-0, F Cooke 1-0, C Boran 0-2, K Harrington 0-1.	Report	L Roche 1-7 (7 frees), L Murphy 0-3, S Roche 1-2, A O'Grady 0-2, F Walsh 0-2, D Purcell 0-1, S Cooney 0-1.	Referee: R Fitzsimons (Offaly)

14 July 2021 Quarter-final	Meath	1-06 - 4-18	Dublin	Páirc Tailteann
	J Ennis 1-2 penalty, two frees; T Shine 0-2; D Darby 0-1; R Conheady 0-1.	Report	D McSweeney 2-8 (6fs, 1 65); C Walsh, C Brennan 1-0 each; C Rock, D O Dualaing 0-3 each; L Kennedy 0-2; N Hogan, C O Riain 0-1 each.	Referee: K Brady (Louth)

==== Leinster semi-finals ====
21 July 2021 Semi-final	Kilkenny	3-23 - 1-16	Offaly	UPMC Nowlan Park
	H Shine 2-15 (goal penalty, 8f); C Hackett 1-2; D Glennon 0-2; E Lyng, T Dunne, K Doyle, D Queally 0-1 each.	Report	A Screeney 1-8 (7f); D Ravenhill 0-2 (f); A Kavanagh 0-2; C Spain, D Bourke, C Nolan, A Coakley 0-1 each.	Referee: C Mooney (Dublin)

21 July 2021 Semi-final	Wexford	1-15 - 1-12	Dublin	Chadwicks Wexford Park
	L Roche (8f, 1, 65) 0-9, S Roche 1-0, C O Tuama, Dylan Purcell, Darby Purcell, C Byrne, L Murphy, C Doyle 0-1 each.	Report	D McSweeney (2f, 1, 65) 1-4, C Dolan, B Gaughran, C O Riain, D O Dullaing 0-2 each.	Referee: A Kinahan (Offaly)

==== Leinster final ====
28 July 2021 Final	Kilkenny	1-15 - 2-10	Wexford	Netwatch Cullen Park
	H Shine 0-6 (5f); T Dunne 1-1; D Glennon 0-3; G Dunne, J Neary, K Doyle, K Carey, D Queally 0-1 each. Wexford:	Report	L Roche 0-7 (7f); A O’Grady, S Roche 1-1 each; L Murphy 0-1.	Referee: T Gleeson (Dublin)

=== Munster Minor Hurling Championship ===
==== Munster quarter-finals ====
14 July 2021 Quarter-final	Clare	0-06 - 6-28	Cork	Semple Stadium
	N O’Farrell 0-2f, J Organ, C Whelan (f), S Rynne 0-1 each.	Report	J Leahy 3-9 (0-4f), R O’Sullivan 1-3, A Walsh 2-0, D Healy, W Buckley 0-4 each, J Dwyer, T O’Connell 0-2 each, D O’Sullivan, B O’Connor, B Nyhan, M Finn 0-1 each.	Referee: N Barry (Waterford)

14 July 2021 Quarter-final	Tipperary	2-27 - 1-14	Kerry	LIT Gaelic Grounds
	O Jones 0-8 (2f, ’65), D Minogue 0-7, D Guinan 2-0, C Martin 0-5, R Connolly 0-3 (3f), T Shayanewako 0-2, P McCormack and T Delaney 0-1 each.	Report	F O’Sullivan 0-9 (6f), K Boyle 1-0, J Enright 0-2, S Tuomey-McElligott, E Stack and D Maloney 0-1.	Referee: C O’Regan (Cork)

==== Munster semi-finals ====
27 July 2021 Semi-final	Limerick	1-14 - 1-24	Cork	Semple Stadium
	S O'Brien 0-7 (0-6f), D Fitzgerald 1-0, M Riordan 0-3, J Fitzgerald, C Scully, P Kennedy, P Connery 0-1 each.	Report	J Leahy 1-14 (0-9f, 0-1 65), D Healy 0-4, T O’Connell 0-2, E O’Leary, T Wilk, D Cremin, B Nyhan 0-1 each.	Referee: N O'Toole (Waterford)

27 July 2021 Semi-final	Waterford	2-25 - 4-11	Tipperary	Páirc Uí Rinn
	P Fitzgerald 0-11 (0-6f); P Cummins 1-3; J Twomey 1-2; S Callaghan 0-3 (0-1f); F Hallinan, M Ó Mathúna 0-2 each; J O’Donnell, L Ó Siothcháin 0-1 each.	Report	D Minogue 2-3; R Connolly 1-2 (0-1f); T Shayanewako 1-0; T Delaney, C Martin 0-2 each; D Guinan, O Harrigan 0-1 each.	Referee: J Mullins (Clare)

==== Munster final ====
9 August 2021 Final	Cork	1-26 - 1-15	Waterford	Semple Stadium
	J Leahy 0-11 (0-7 frees, 0-1 65), E O’Leary 1-2, W Buckley 0-4, D Healy, M Finn (0-1 sideline), T Wilk 0-2 each, C Tobin, B Nyhan, A Walsh 0-1 each.	Report	P Fitzgerald 0-8 (0-7 frees, 0-1 65), J Twomey 1-4, P Cummins 0-2, B O’Connell 0-1.	Referee: J O'Halloran (Limerick)

=== All-Ireland Minor Hurling Championship ===
==== All-Ireland semi-final ====
14 August 2021 Semi-final	Galway	0-23 - 1-12	Kilkenny	Semple Stadium
	R Burke 0-10 (0-9f, 0-1 ’65), O Lohan 0-3, M Power 0-3, D Neary 0-2, J Cosgrove 0-2, T Leen 0-1, D Dunne 0-1, D Shaughnessy 0-1.	Report	H Shine 0-7 (0-6f), D Glennon 1-1, J Fitzpatrick 0-2, B Whitty 0-1, C Hackett 0-1.	Referee: Rory McGann (An Clár)

==== All-Ireland final ====
21 August 2021 Final	Cork	1-23 - 0-12	Galway	Semple Stadium
	J Leahy 0-7 (3f), D Cremin 1-2, D Healy 0-4, W Buckley 0-3, M Finn 0-2 (1 sideline), D O’Sullivan 0-2, E O’Leary 0-1, B O’Connor 0-1, C Tobin 0-1.	Report	R Burke 0-5 (4f), M Power 0-4, D Shaughnessy 0-2, D Dunne 0-1.	Referee: C Cunning (Antrim)

== Statistics ==
=== Top scorers ===
Top scorer overall

Rank	Player	Club	Tally	Total	Matches	Average
1	Jack Leahy	Cork	4-41	53	4	13.25
2	Harry Shine	Kilkenny	2-28	34	3	11.33
3	Fionn Maher	Kildare	0-29	29	3	9.66
4	Luke Roche	Wexford	1-23	26	3	8.66
5	Denis McSweeney	Dublin	3-12	21	2	10.50
6	Joe Ennis	Meath	2-13	19	2	9.50
6	Patrick Fitzgerald	Waterford	0-19	19	2	9.50
8	Darragh Minogue	Offaly	2-10	16	2	8.00
9	Rory Burke	Galway	0-15	15	2	7.50
10	Diarmuid Healy	Cork	0-14	14	4	3.50

In a single game

Rank	Player	Club	Tally	Total	Opposition
1	Harry Shine	Kilkenny	2-15	21	Offaly
2	Jack Leahy	Cork	3-09	18	Clare
3	Jack Leahy	Cork	1-14	17	Limerick
4	Fionn Maher	Kildare	0-15	15	Carlow
5	Denis McSweeney	Dublin	2-08	14	Meath
5	Joe Ennis	Meath	1-11	14	Westmeath
7	Adam Screeney	Offaly	1-08	11	Kilkenny
7	Patrick Fitzgerald	Waterford	0-11	11	Tipperary
7	Jack Leahy	Cork	0-11	11	Waterford
10	Luke Roche	Wexford	1-07	10	Kildare
10	Rory Burke	Galway	0-10	10	Kilkenny

== Awards ==
Team of the Year
