= Niall O'Farrell =

Irish hurler

Personal information
- Native name: Niall Ó Fearghaíl (Irish)
- Born: 2004 (age 21–22) Broadford, County Clare, Ireland
- Occupation: Student

Sport
- Sport: Hurling
- Position: Centre-back
Club
- Years: Club
- 2022-present: Broadford
Club titles
- Clare titles: 0
College
- Years: College
- 2022-present: TUS Midwest
College titles
- Fitzgibbon titles: 0
Inter-county
- Years: County
- 2026-: Clare
Inter-county titles
- Munster titles: 0
- All-Irelands: 0
- NHL: 0
- All Stars: 0

Niall O'Farrell (born 2004) is an Irish hurler. At club level he plays with Broadford and at inter-county level with the Clare senior hurling team.

== Career ==
O'Farrell attended Ardscoil Rís in Limerick and played hurling at all levels during his time as a student there. He was the senior team's top scorer in 2022, when Ardscoil Rís won the Dr Croke Cup after a 1–17 to 0–15 win over St Kieran's College in the final. O'Farrell later studied at the TUS Midwest and lined out in the Fitzgibbon Cup.

At club level, O'Farrell first played for the Broadford club at juvenile and underage levels. He was part of the club's under-21 team that claimed the Clare U21BHC title in 2022. O'Farrell progressed to adult level and won a Clare JAHC in 2023, following a 3–13 to 2–11 win over Clooney–Quin in the final.

O'Farrell first played for Clare during a two-year tenure with the minor team in 2020 and 2021. He immediately progressed to the under-20 team. O'Farrell made his senior team during Clare's National Hurling League Division 1B-winning campaign in 2026.

== Honours ==
Ardscoil Rís

- Dr Croke Cup (1): 2022

Broadford

- Clare Junior A Hurling Championship (1): 2023
- Clare Under-21 B Hurling Championship (2): 2022 2023

Clare

- National Hurling League Division 1B (1): 2026
