= Liam Collins =

Irish hurler (born 2003)

Personal information
- Native name: Liam Ó Coileáin (Irish)
- Born: 2003 (age 22–23) Cappataggle, County Galway, Ireland
- Occupation: Student

Sport
- Sport: Hurling
- Position: Right corner-forward
Club
- Years: Club
- Cappataggle
Club titles
- Galway titles: 0
College
- Years: College
- 2022-present: University of Galway
College titles
- Fitzgibbon titles: 0
Inter-county*
Years	County	Apps (scores)
2022-	Galway	0 (0-00)
Inter-county titles
- Leinster titles: 0
- All-Irelands: 0
- NHL: 0
- All Stars: 0
- *Inter County team apps and scores correct as of 19:44, 22 March 2023.

Liam Collins (born 2003) is an Irish hurler. At club level he plays with Cappataggle and at inter-county level with the Galway senior hurling team. Collins usually lines out as a forward.

== Career ==
Collins first played hurling and Gaelic football as a schoolboy at Garbally College where he won a Connacht SBFC title in 2022. He later won an All-Ireland freshers' title as a student at the University of Galway in 2023. By this stage, Collins had already joined the Cappatagle senior team.

Collins first appeared on the inter-county scene as a member of the Galway minor hurling team that won a record fourth successive All-Ireland MHC title in 2020. He was the team's top scorer with 3-14 and was later named GAA Minor Star Hurler of the Year. Collins immediately progressed onto the Galway under-20 hurling team and came on as a substitute when they were beaten by Cork in the 2002 All-Ireland under-20 final.

Collins made his senior team debut against Wexford during the 2023 National League.

== Career statistics ==
As of 19 March 2023

Team	Year	National League			Leinster		All-Ireland		Total	
Team	Year	Division	Apps	Score	Apps	Score	Apps	Score	Apps	Score
Galway Minor	2020	—			—		3	3-14	3	3-14
Galway Minor	Total	—			—		3	3-14	3	3-14
Galway U20	2021	—			1	0-00	1	0-00	2	0-00
Galway U20	2022	—			1	0-12	—		1	0-12
Galway U20	Total	—			2	0-12	1	0-00	3	0-12
Galway	2023	Division 1A	4	0-04	0	0-00	0	0-00	4	0-04
Galway	Total		4	0-04	0	0-00	0	0-00	4	0-04
Career total			4	0-04	2	0-12	1	0-00	7	0-16

== Honours ==
Garbally College

- Connacht Post Primary Schools Senior B Football Championship: 2022

University of Galway

- All-Ireland Freshers' Hurling Championship: 2023

Galway

- Leinster Under-20 Hurling Championship: 2021
- All-Ireland Minor Hurling Championship: 2020
