= Donal O'Shea (hurler) =

Irish hurler

Personal information
- Native name: Donal Ó Sé (Irish)
- Born: 2001 (age 24–25) Galway, Ireland
- Occupation: Student

Sport
- Sport: Hurling
- Position: Full-forward
Club
- Years: Club
- Salthill-Knocknacarra
Club titles
- Galway titles: 0
College
- Years: College
- 2020-present: University College Dublin
College titles
- Fitzgibbon titles: 0
Inter-county*
Years	County	Apps (scores)
2023-	Galway	0 (0-00)
Inter-county titles
- Leinster titles: 0
- All-Irelands: 0
- NHL: 0
- All Stars: 0
- *Inter County team apps and scores correct as of 20:05, 13 February 2022.

Donal O'Shea (born 2001) is an Irish hurler. At club level, he plays with Salthill-Knocknacarra, while he is also a member of the Galway senior hurling team. He usually lines out as a forward.

== Career ==
O'Shea first played hurling at juvenile and underage levels with the Salthill-Knocknacarra club, before eventually progressing to the adult level. He enjoyed his first success in 2021 when Salthill claimed the Galway JHC title. O'Shea later claimed a Conancht JCHC title after a defeat of Easkey in the final. He has also lined out with University College Dublin in the Fitzgibbon Cup.

O'Shea first appeared at inter-county level with Galway as full-forward on the minor team that won the All-Ireland MHC title in 2018. As well as being Galway's top scorer, he was also named GAA Minor Star Hurler of the Year. O'Shea spent two years with the under-20 team and was again the team's top scorer when Galway were beaten by Cork in the 2021 All-Ireland under-20 final.

O'Shea made his first appearance for the senior team during the 2023 Walsh Cup.

== Personal life ==
His father, Eamon O'Shea, played hurling with Tipperary and Dublin and also served as Tipperary manager.

== Career statistics ==
As of 11 February 2023.

Team	Year	National League			Leinster		All-Ireland		Total	
Team	Year	Division	Apps	Score	Apps	Score	Apps	Score	Apps	Score
Galway	2023	Division 1A	1	0-01	0	0-00	0	0-00	1	0-01
Career total			1	0-01	0	0-00	0	0-00	1	0-01

== Honours ==
Salthill-Knocknacarra

- Connacht Junior Club Hurling Championship: 2021
- Galway Junior Hurling Championship: 2021

Galway

- Leinster Under-20 Hurling Championship: 2021
- All-Ireland Minor Hurling Championship: 2019

Achievements
Preceded by Brian Turnbull	GAA Minor Star Hurler of the Year; 2018	Succeeded by Seán McDonagh
