= Shane O'Brien (hurler) =

Irish hurler

Personal information
- Native name: Seán Ó Briain (Irish)
- Nickname: The Bull
- Born: 17 June 2004 (age 22) Kilmallock, County Limerick, Ireland
- Occupation: Student
- Height: 6 ft 0 in (183 cm)

Sport
- Sport: Hurling
- Position: Right corner-forward
Club
Years	Club	Apps (scores)
2022-present	Kilmallock	26 (11-121)
Club titles
- Limerick titles: 0
College
- Years: College
- 2022-2026: Mary Immaculate College
College titles
- Fitzgibbon titles: 1
Inter-county*
Years	County	Apps (scores)
2023-present	Limerick	16 (2-34)
Inter-county titles
- Munster titles: 3
- All-Irelands: 2
- NHL: 2
- All Stars: 0
- *Inter County team apps and scores correct as of 9:31, 20 July 2026.

Shane O'Brien (born 17 June 2004) is an Irish hurler. At club level, he plays with Kilmallock and at inter-county level with the Limerick senior hurling team.

== Early life ==
Born and raised in Kilmallock, County Limerick, O'Brien was educated at Ardscoil Rís in Limerick. He played in all grades of hurling during his time there and was joint-captain of the school's senior team that lost the 2022 Dr Harty Cup final to St Joseph's Secondary School, Tulla. He subsequently won a Dr Croke Cup medal, following a 1–17 to 0–15 win over St Kieran's College in the final. During his studies at Mary Immaculate College, O'Brien was selected for the college's senior hurling team. He won a Fitzgibbon Cup medal in February 2024 following the 2–14 to 1–15 win over the University of Limerick in the final.

== Club career ==
O'Brien began his club career at juvenile and underage levels with Kilmallock. He made his senior team debut in July 2022 in a 2–23 to 2–09 win over Patrickswell. O'Brien ended his debut season with a 3–23 to 2–15 defeat by Na Piarsaigh in the 2022 Limerick SHC final.

== Inter-county career ==
O'Brien first appeared on the inter-county scene for Limerick during a two-year tenure with the minor team. He won a Munster MHC medal in his first season in December 2020, when Limerick beat Tipperary in extra time by 2–22 to 0–25 in a COVID-delayed Munster MHC final. O'Brien progressed to the under-20 team in 2022 and won a Munster U20HC following a four-point win over Tipperary. He was at right corner-forward for Limerick's 0–19 to 0–18 defeat by Kilkenny in the 2022 All-Ireland U20HC final.

O'Brien made his senior team in a 1–27 to 2–18 National Hurling League win over Clare in February 2023. He made a number of appearances throughout the league campaign, including in the 2–20 to 0–15 win over Kilkenny in the final. O'Brien was a member of the extended panel when Limerick beat Clare by 1–23 to 1–22 to win a record-equalling fifth consecutive Munster SHC title in June 2023. He was again part of teh extended panel when Limerick won a record-equalling fourth consecutive All-Ireland SHC title, following a 0–30 to 2–15 win over Kilkenny in the 2023 All-Ireland SHC final.

O'Brien, in his first championship start, scored 0–02 from play when Limerick won a record-breaking sixth consecutive Munster SHC title after a 1–26 to 1–20 win over Clare in the 2024 Munster SHC final. After a trophy-less 2025 season, Limerick regained the National League title with a six-point win over Cork in April 2026, with O'Brien claiming his second winners' medal. He later collected a third Munster SHC medal, as Limerick also regained that title with a 1–21 to 2–17 win over Cork in the final. O'Brien won a second All-Ireland SHC medal, his first on the field of play, after a 1–29 to 1–18 win over Galway in the 2026 All-Ireland SHC final.

== Personal life ==
O'Brien is the son of Adrian O’Brien, a performance coach and athletic development specialist, and Edwina (née Moloney). His grandfather, Paudie Moloney, appeared on The Traitors Ireland and Dancing with the Stars.

== Career statistics ==
=== Club ===
As of 29 August 2026

Team	Year	Limerick SHC	
Team	Year	Apps	Score
Kilmallock	2022	7	2-20
Kilmallock	2023	5	1-19
Kilmallock	2024	7	4-23
Kilmallock	2025	7	4-59
Kilmallock	2026	3	3-06
Career total		29	14-127

=== Inter-county ===
As of 19 July 2026.

Team	Year	National League			Munster		All-Ireland		Total	
Team	Year	Division	Apps	Score	Apps	Score	Apps	Score	Apps	Score
Limerick	2023	Division 1A	4	0-02	0	0-00	0	0-00	4	0-02
Limerick	2024	Division 1A	3	1-08	2	0-05	1	0-02	6	1-15
Limerick	2025	Division 1A	5	2-07	5	2-11	1	0-00	11	4-18
Limerick	2026	Division 1A	6	2-12	5	0-15	2	0-01	13	2-28
Career total			18	5-29	12	2-31	4	0-03	34	7-63

== Honours ==
Ardscoil Rís

- Dr Croke Cup (1): 2022 (jc)

Mary Immaculate College

- Fitzgibbon Cup (1): 2024

Limerick

- All-Ireland Senior Hurling Championship (2): 2024, 2026
- Munster Senior Hurling Championship (3): 2023, 2024, 2026
- National Hurling League (2): 2023, 2026
- Munster Under-20 Hurling Championship (1): 2022
- Munster Minor Hurling Championship (1): 2020
