= Harry Shine =

Irish hurler

Personal information
- Native name: Anraí Ó Seighin (Irish)
- Born: 2004 (age 21–22) Kilkenny, Ireland
- Occupation: Student

Sport
- Sport: Hurling
- Position: Right corner-forward
Club*
| Years | Club | Apps (scores) |
| 2022-present | Dicksboro | 3 (0-04) |
Club titles
- Kilkenny titles: 0
College
- Years: College
- 2023-present: Maynooth University
College titles
- Fitzgibbon titles: 0
Inter-county
- Years: County
- 2024-: Kilkenny
Inter-county titles
- Leinster titles: 2
- All-Irelands: 0
- NHL: 0
- All Stars: 0
- * club appearances and scores correct as of 12:28, 11 February 2024.

Harry Shine (born 2004) is an Irish hurler. At club level he plays with Dicksboro and at inter-county level with the Kilkenny senior hurling team.

== Career ==
Shine first played hurling at juvenile and underage levels with the Dicksboro club in Kilkenny. He was part of the Dicksboro minor team that won three successive Kilkenny MAHC titles from 2019 to 2021. Shine also lined out as a schoolboy with St Kieran's College and was joint-captain for their Dr Croke Cup success over Presentation College, Athenry in 2023.

Shine first appeared on the inter-county scene as a member of the Kilkenny minor hurling team that lost the 2019 All-Ireland minor final to Galway. He was again eligible for the grade the following year and captained the team as well as being top scorer. Shine immediately progressed to the under-20 team, however, a hamstring injury ruled him out of much of Kilkenny's defeat of Limerick in the 2022 All-Ireland under-20 final.

Shine first played for the senior team during the 2024 National Hurling League.

== Career statistics ==
As of 10 February 2024

| Team | Year | National League | | | Leinster | | All-Ireland | | Total | |
| Team | Year | Division | Apps | Score | Apps | Score | Apps | Score | Apps | Score |
|---|---|---|---|---|---|---|---|---|---|---|
| Kilkenny Minor | 2020 | — | | | 2 | 1-03 | 1 | 0-01 | 3 | 1-04 |
| Kilkenny Minor | 2021 | — | | | 2 | 2-21 | 1 | 0-07 | 3 | 2-28 |
| Kilkenny Minor | Total | — | | | 4 | 3-24 | 2 | 0-08 | 6 | 3-32 |
| Kilkenny U20 | 2022 | — | | | 2 | 1-05 | 0 | 0-00 | 2 | 1-05 |
| Kilkenny U20 | 2023 | — | | | 4 | 0-05 | — | | 4 | 0-05 |
| Kilkenny U20 | 2024 | — | | | 0 | 0-00 | — | | 0 | 0-00 |
| Kilkenny U20 | Total | — | | | 6 | 1-10 | 0 | 0-00 | 6 | 1-10 |
| Kilkenny | 2024 | Division 1A | 1 | 0-00 | 0 | 0-00 | 0 | 0-00 | 1 | 0-00 |
| Kilkenny | Total | | 1 | 0-00 | 0 | 0-00 | 0 | 0-00 | 1 | 0-00 |
| Career total | | | 1 | 0-00 | 10 | 4-34 | 2 | 0-08 | 13 | 4-42 |

== Honours ==
St Kieran's College

- Dr Croke Cup: 2023

Dicksboro

- Kilkenny Minor A Hurling Championship: 2019, 2020, 2021

Kilkenny

- Leinster Senior Hurling Championship: 2024, 2025
- All-Ireland Under-20 Hurling Championship: 2022
- Leinster Under-20 Hurling Championship: 2022
- Leinster Minor Hurling Championship: 2020, 2021

Sporting positions
| Preceded by Timmy Clifford | Kilkenny minor hurling team captain 2021 | Succeeded by Tom McPhillips |
