= 2022–23 Harty Cup =

Hurling tournament

2022–23 Dr Harty Cup
- Dates: 12 October 2022 – 5 February 2023
- Teams: 14
- Sponsor: TUS
- Champions: Cashel Community School (1st title); Ronan Connolly (captain); Ben Currivan (captain); Brendan Ryan (manager)
- Runners-up: Thurles CBS; Tommy Maher (captain); Éamonn Buckley (manager)

Tournament statistics
- Matches played: 25
- Goals scored: 69 (2.76 per match)
- Points scored: 767 (30.68 per match)
- Top scorer(s): Jack Leahy (3-34)

The 2022–23 Dr Harty Cup was the 102nd staging of the Harty Cup since its establishment in hurling by the Munster Council of Gaelic Athletic Association in 1918. The draw for the group stage took place on 18 August 2022. The competition contested from 12 October 2022 to 5 February 2023.

St Joseph's Secondary School unsuccessfully defended its title, suffering two defeats in the group stage and failing to qualify for the knockout stage.

Cashel Community School won the Harty Cup final on 5 February 2023 at FBD Semple Stadium in Thurles, 0–12 to 0–11, against Thurles CBS, in what was Cashel's first ever meeting in a final and their first ever Harty Cup title.

Midleton CBS Secondary School's Jack Leahy was the top scorer with 3-34.

== Group A ==
=== Group A table ===
Knockout stage

| Team | Matches | | | | Score | | | Pts |
| Team | Pld | W | D | L | For | Against | Diff | Pts |
|---|---|---|---|---|---|---|---|---|
| Christian Brothers College | 3 | 2 | 1 | 0 | 70 | 50 | 20 | 5 |
| De La Salle College | 3 | 1 | 2 | 0 | 61 | 52 | 9 | 4 |
| Nenagh CBS | 3 | 1 | 1 | 1 | 73 | 59 | 14 | 3 |
| Gaelcholáiste Mhuire | 3 | 0 | 0 | 3 | 40 | 83 | -43 | 0 |

=== Group A results ===
| 12 October 2022 Round 1 | De La Salle College Waterford | 1-18 - 2-15 | Nenagh CBS | Leahy Park |
| | J Twomey (0-10, 0-9f), R Wymberry 1-0, C Hartley (0-3, 0-2f), C Tobin 0-2, C Keane 0-1f, A O'Neill 0-1f. | Report | D McCarthy (2-7, 0-7f), K Grace 0-3, C Foley 0-1f, J Mulcahy, J O'Meara, A Hall, F McIntyre 0-1 each. |

| 12 October 2022 Round 1 | Christian Brothers College, Cork | 2-19 - 0-16 | Gaelcholáiste Mhuire | Church Road |
| | M Finn (1-8, 0-5 frees), D Cremin (0-5), F Heffernan (1-1), F Barry (0-4, 0-1 free), R Cummins (0-1). | Report | R Ó Suilleabháin (0-10, 0-7 frees, 0-1 65), M Ó Siocháin (0-3), C Mac Uidhir, S P Cúc and L Ó Siocháin (0-1 each). |

| 26 October 2022 Round 2 | Christian Brothers College, Cork | 2-19 - 1-11 | Nenagh CBS | Ballyagran Grounds |
| | D Cremin (1-6), M Finn (0-7, 0-4 frees), M O’Dwyer (1-2, 0-1 free), P Lehane, G O’Shea, F Heffernan and R Cummins (0-1 each). | Report | D McCarthy (0-10, 0-8 frees), J Mulcahy (1-0), A Hall (0-1). |

| 26 October 2022 Round 2 | De La Salle College Waterford | 1-17 - 1-08 | Gaelcholáiste Mhuire | Fraher Field |
| | J Twomey 1-7 (6fs), C Hartley 0-4 (3fs), D Leavey 0-2, D Fitzpatrick, R Wymberry, A O'Neill, C Keane 0-1 each. | Report | R Ó Súilleabháin 0-8 (8fs), C Ó Riagáin 1-0. |

| 16 November 2022 Round 3 | Nenagh CBS | 4-26 - 0-13 | Gaelcholáiste Mhuire | St John's Park |
| | D McCarthy (0-15, 0-12 frees); J Mulcahy (2-2); A Hall (1-3); D Quinn (1-2); C Foley (0-3, 0-2 frees); K Grace (0-1 each). | Report | R Ó Súilleabháin (0-9, 0-5 frees); J Ó hÉigeartaigh, D Ó Dochartaigh, D Ó Scannláin (0-1 each). |

| 16 November 2022 Round 3 | De La Salle College Waterford | 1-17 - 2-14 | Christian Brothers College, Cork | Ardmore Grounds |
| | J Twomey 0-8 (7fs), A O'Neill 0-4, R Doherty 1-0, C Hartley 0-3 (1f), C Tobin 0-2. | Report | M Finn 0-10 (8fs), E O'Sullivan, F Heffernan 1-0 each, M O'Dwyer 0-2, D Cremin, J Casey 0-1 each. |

== Group B ==
=== Group B table ===
Knockout stage

| Team | Matches | | | | Score | | | Pts |
| Team | Pld | W | D | L | For | Against | Diff | Pts |
|---|---|---|---|---|---|---|---|---|
| Thurles CBS | 3 | 3 | 0 | 0 | 89 | 39 | 50 | 6 |
| Our Lady's SS | 3 | 2 | 0 | 1 | 66 | 59 | 7 | 4 |
| St Francis College | 3 | 1 | 0 | 2 | 57 | 58 | -1 | 2 |
| Pobalscoil na Tríonóide | 3 | 0 | 0 | 3 | 41 | 92 | -51 | 0 |

=== Group B results ===
| 12 October 2022 Round 1 | Thurles CBS | 3-20 - 2-09 | St Francis College | Mitchelstown Grounds |
| | T Maher (0-7, 5 frees), R Stapleton (1-4), R Ryan (0-4, all frees), A Stakelum, J Lahart (both 1-1), D Kelly (0-2), B Flanagan (0-1). | Report | C Lucas (1-2), M O’Mahony (0-4, all frees), E O’Connor (1-0), C O’Keeffe (0-1), M O’Connell, K Lyons (0-1 free each). |

| 12 October 2022 Round 1 | Our Lady's Secondary School | 1-29 - 1-14 | Pobalscoil na Tríonóide | Duneske Grounds |
| | | Report |

| 26 October 2022 Round 2 | Thurles CBS | 2-17 - 0-10 | Our Lady's Secondary School | The Ragg |
| | R Ryan (1-5, 1-3 frees); R Stapleton (1-4); J Egan, A Stakelum (0-2 each); J Ryan (free), T Maher (free), J Lahart, D Kelly (0-1 each). | Report | P Phelan (0-6, 5 frees); J Ormond (0-2 frees); N Walsh, C Guilfoyle (0-1 each). |

| 26 October 2022 Round 2 | St Francis College | 3-14 - 0-08 | Pobalscoil na Tríonóide | Killeagh Grounds |
| | C Hallahan (2-1), M O’Mahony (0-4 (1f, 1 65), E O’Connor (1-2), C Lucas (0-4), R Dooley, F Leahy, and M O‘Connell (0-1 each). | Report | J Murray (0-6, 5f, 1 65), B Lynch and S Meade (0-1 each). |

| 16 November 2022 Round 3 | Our Lady's Secondary School | 3-15 - 2-13 | St Francis College | Canon Hayes Park |
| | J Ormond (0-9, 5 frees); C O’Shea (1-2); M Cahill, J McMahon (1-0 each); N Walsh (0-2); P Phelan (free), D McAllister (0-1 each). | Report | M O’Mahony (0-6 frees); E O’Flynn, C Lucas (1-1 each); K Lyons (1 free), E O’Connor (0-2 each); R Hanley (0-1). |

| 16 November 2022 Round 3 | Thurles CBS | 4-25 - 2-08 | Pobalscoil na Tríonóide | Carriganore Complex |
| | | Report |

== Group C ==
=== Group C table ===
Knockout stage

| Team | Matches | | | | Score | | | Pts |
| Team | Pld | W | D | L | For | Against | Diff | Pts |
|---|---|---|---|---|---|---|---|---|
| Ardscoil Rís | 2 | 2 | 0 | 0 | 33 | 28 | 5 | 4 |
| Cashel Community School | 2 | 1 | 0 | 1 | 45 | 47 | -2 | 2 |
| St Flannan's College | 2 | 0 | 0 | 2 | 36 | 39 | -3 | 0 |

=== Group C results ===
| 12 October 2022 Round 1 | Cashel Community School | 5-12 - 2-20 | St Flannan's College | Cappamore Grounds |
| | B Currivan 4-0, R Connolly 0-9 (7f, 2’65s), D McGrath 1-1, S Buckley and E Ormond 0-1 each. | Report | O Whelan 1-11 (1-7f, 2’65s), D Keane Hayes 1-0, J Organ 0-3, J Doherty 0-2, L Cleary, C Kirby, F Kirby and J Casey 0-1 each. |

| 26 October 2022 Round 2 | Ardscoil Rís | 3-12 - 1-15 | Cashel Community School | Cappamore Grounds |
| | C Scully (1-6, 0-4 frees), D Stritch, S Gleeson (1-0 each), M O’Brien (0-2), M O’Halloran, F Fitzgerald, D Scully, M Collins (0-1 each) | Report | R Connolly (0-8, 0-6 frees), A Daly (1-3), D McGrath (0-2), D Fogarty, Ben Currivane (0-1 each) |

| 16 November 2022 Round 3 | Ardscoil Rís | 0-12 - 0-10 | St Flannan's College | O'Garney Park |
| | C Scully (0-3, 2f, 1’65); F Fitzgerald (0-2, 1f); D Scully, D Neville, M Collins, M Gavin, S Gleeson, J Moylan, M O’Brien (0-1 each) | Report | O Whelan (0-6f); S Scanlan (0-2); F Hegarty, L Cleary (0-1 each) |

== Group D ==
=== Group D table ===
Knockout stage

| Team | Matches | | | | Score | | | Pts |
| Team | Pld | W | D | L | For | Against | Diff | Pts |
|---|---|---|---|---|---|---|---|---|
| Midleton CBS | 2 | 1 | 1 | 0 | 48 | 36 | 12 | 3 |
| St Colman's College | 2 | 1 | 1 | 0 | 46 | 34 | 12 | 3 |
| St Joseph's SS | 2 | 0 | 0 | 2 | 30 | 54 | -24 | 0 |

=== Group D results ===
| 12 October 2022 Round 1 | Midleton CBS | 0-20 - 0-20 | St Colman's College | Felix Sarsfield Memorial Park |
| | J Leahy (0-11, 4 frees, 2 65s); T Wilk (0-2); C O’Callaghan, D Murnane, T O’Regan, J O’Brien, D McCarthy, S Irwin, C Leahy (0-1 each). | Report | J Magner (0-11, 7 frees, 1 65); R O’Connell (1 free), B Lehane, S O’Donoghue, C Tobin (0-2 each); L Foley (0-1). | Referee: E Coleman (Youghal) |

| 26 October 2022 Round 2 | St Colman's College | 4-14 - 0-14 | St Joseph's Secondary School | Knocklong Sports Field |
| | J O’Connor (0-6, all frees), L O’Connor (0-3, all frees), S Boyce (0-2), D Fox (0-1), D Moroney (0-1), D Fitzgerald (0-1, free). | Report | J Magner (3-5, 5 frees), S O’Donoghue (1-2), L Óg Hegarty (0-2), L Foley (0-1), M O’Driscoll (0-1), R O’Connor (0-1), G O’Brien (0-1), C O’Leary (0-1). |

| 16 November 2022 Round 3 | Midleton CBS | 1-25 - 1-13 | St Joseph's Secondary School | Ballyagran Grounds |
| | J Leahy (1-12, 1-8 frees), P Walsh (0-5), D McCarthy (0-2), D Leahy, D Murnane, T O’Regan, S Irwin, C Leahy, D Buckley (0-1 each). | Report | L O’Connor (0-6, 0-5 frees), D Fox (1-3), E Craven (frees) and S Boyce (0-2 each). |

== Knockout stage ==
=== Quarter-finals ===
| 11 January 2023 Quarter-final | Ardscoil Rís | 1-22 - 1-17 | Our Lady's Secondary School | University of Limerick |
| | F Fitzgerald (0-9, 5 frees, 1 pen); M Collins (0-6); D Neville (1-1); M O’Brien (0-2); J O’Keeffe, M Gavin, D Stritch, S Gleeson (0-1 each). | Report | J Ormond (0-7, 5 frees); P Phelan (0-4 frees); C O’Shea (1-1); M Cahill (0-2); J Ryan, N Walsh, J McMahon (0-1 each). | Referee: É Stepleton (Limerick) |

| 11 January 2023 Quarter-final | Cashel Community School | 1-13 - 0-13 | Christian Brothers College, Cork | Ballyagran Grounds |
| | R Connolly 0-6 (0-5 f), B Currivan 1-2 (0-2 f), A Daly, O O’Donoghue, D McGrath, C Ryan, G O’Dwyer 0-1 each. | Report | M Finn (f), P O’Shea 0-4 each, F Barry, R Cummins 0-2 each, D Cremin 0-1. |

| 11 January 2023 Quarter-final | Midleton CBS | 2-15 - 0-16 | De La Salle College Waterford | Fethard 4G Pitch |
| | J Leahy 1-9 (1-6fs), B Walsh 1-2, J O'Brien 0-4. | Report | J Twomey 0-13 (8fs, 2 65s), C Hartley (f), R Doherty, BJ Flynn 0-1 each. | Referee: T Loughnane (Tipperary) |

| 11 January 2023 Quarter-final | Thurles CBS | 1-16 - 0-17 | St Colman's College | Canon Hayes Park |
| | T Maher 1-4 (1-2 f, 0-1 65), R Ryan 0-6 (0-3 f), R Stapleton, S Walsh 0-2 each, J Egan, D Rossiter 0-1 each. | Report | J Magner 0-5 (0-3 f, 0-1 65), R O'Connell, B Lehane 0-3 each, L Foley, L Óg Hegarty 0-2 each, E Flynn, M O'Driscoll 0-1 each. | Referee: C McAllister (Cork) |

=== Semi-finals ===
| 21 January 2023 Semi-final | Thurles CBS | 3-20 - 2-07 | Midleton CBS | Mallow GAA Complex |
| | J Lahart 2-2, R Ryan 1-5 (0-3 f), J Maher, R Stapleton 0-4 each, T Maher (f), J Egan, A Stakelum, J Doyle, D Kelly 0-1 each. | Report | J Leahy 1-2, C Leahy 1-0, D McCarthy, S Irwin 0-2 each, J O’Brien 0-1. | Referee: T Walsh (Waterford) |

| 21 January 2023 Semi-final | Cashel Community School | 1-12 - 0-14 | Ardscoil Rís | Fitzgerald Park |
| | R Connolly (0-5 frees), D McGrath (1-1), A Daly (0-4), C Byrne and B Currivan (0-1 each). | Report | F Fitzgerald (0-6 frees), M Collins, M Gavin and M O’Brien (0-2 each), J O’Keeffe and J Moylan (0-1 each). | Referee: C McAllister (Cork) |

=== Final ===
| 5 February 2023 Final | Cashel Community School | 0-12 - 0-11 | Thurles CBS | FBD Semple Stadium |
| | R Connolly (0-6, 0-5 frees, 0-1 65), E Ormond, B Currivan, O O’Donoghue, D McGrath, F Ryan and A Daly (0-1 each). | Report | T Maher (0-5, 0-4 frees), R Ryan (0-3 frees), B Flanagan, A Stakelum and R Stapleton (0-1 each). | Referee: É Steplaton (Limerick) |

== Statistics ==
=== Top scorers ===
| Rank | Player | Club | Tally | Total | Matches | Average |
|---|---|---|---|---|---|---|
| 1 | Jack Leahy | Midleton CBS | 3-34 | 43 | 4 | 10.75 |
| 2 | Jack Twomey | De La Salle College | 1-38 | 41 | 4 | 10.25 |
| 3 | Darragh McCarthy | Nenagh CBS | 2-32 | 38 | 3 | 12.66 |
