= Zach Bay Hammond =

Irish hurler (born 2003)

Personal information
- Native name: Zach Bay Mac Ámainn (Irish)
- Born: 2003 (age 22–23) Thomastown, County Kilkenny, Ireland
- Occupation: electrician
- Height: 6 ft 1 in (185 cm)

Sport
- Sport: Hurling
- Position: Wing back
Club
- Years: Club
- Thomastown
Club titles
- Kilkenny titles: 1
Inter-county*
Years	County	Apps (scores)
2024-	Kilkenny	0 (0-00)
Inter-county titles
- Leinster titles: 0
- All-Irelands: 0
- NHL: 0
- All Stars: 1 (minor)
- *Inter County team apps and scores correct as of 20:25, 11 February 2024.

Zach Bay Hammond (born 2003) is an Irish hurler. At club level he plays with Thomastown and at inter-county level with the Kilkenny senior hurling team.

== Career ==
Hammond first played hurling at juvenile and underage levels with the Thomastown club, while also playing as a schoolboy with CBS Kilkenny in the Leinster Colleges' SHC. He progressed to adult club level and was part of the Thomastown team that beat Castlelyons to win the All-Ireland Club IHC title in 2024.

Hammond first appeared on the inter-county scene as a member of the Kilkenny minor hurling team that lost the 2019 All-Ireland minor final to Galway. He was again part of the minor team that lost the 2020 All-Ireland minor final to Galway. Hammond was later vice-captain of the under-20 team for the 2023 Leinster U20HC campaign.

Hammond first played for the senior team during the 2024 National Hurling League.

== Honours ==
Thomastown

- All-Ireland Intermediate Club Hurling Championship: 2024
- Leinster Intermediate Club Hurling Championship: 2023
- Kilkenny Intermediate Hurling Championship: 2023

Kilkenny

- Leinster Minor Hurling Championship: 2020
