= Éamonn Cunneen =

Irish hurler

Éamon Cunneen
Personal information
- Born: 2003 (age 22–23) Raharney, County Westmeath, Ireland
- Occupation: Student

Sport
- Sport: Hurling
- Position: Midfield
Club
- Years: Club
- 2021-present: Raharney
Club titles
- Westmeath titles: 1
Inter-county
- Years: County
- 2022-present: Westmeath
Inter-county titles
- Leinster titles: 0
- All-Irelands: 0
- NHL: 0
- All Stars: 0

Éamon Cunneen (born 2003) is an Irish hurler. At club level he plays with Raharney, while he has also lined out at inter-county level with various Westmeath teams.

== Career ==
Cunneen first played hurling at juvenile and underage levels with the Raharney club. He progressed to the senior team and won a Westmeath SHC medal in 2021 when Raharney beat Castletown-Geoghegan in the final. Cunneen enjoyed further success in 2022 when Raharney claimed the Westmeath U19HC title.

At inter-county level, Cunneen first appeared for Westmeath as captain of the minor team in 2020. His performances that season earned his inclusion on the Team of the Year. Cunneen later spent three seasons with the under-20 team before making his senior team debut during the Kehoe Cup in 2022.

== Honours ==
Raharney

- Westmeath Senior Hurling Championship: 2021
- Westmeath Under-19 Division 1 Hurling Championship: 2022
