= Rory Burke (hurler) =

Irish hurler

Personal information
- Native name: Ruairí de Búrca (Irish)
- Born: 2005 (age 20–21) Oranmore, County Galway, Ireland
- Occupation: Student

Sport
- Sport: Hurling
- Position: Centre-forward
Club
- Years: Club
- 2023-present: Oranmore–Maree
Club titles
- Galway titles: 0
College
- Years: College
- ATU Galway
College titles
- Fitzgibbon titles: 0
Inter-county
- Years: County
- 2026-: Galway
Inter-county titles
- Leinster titles: 1
- All-Irelands: 0
- NHL: 0
- All Stars: 0

Rory Burke (born 2005) is an Irish hurler. At club level he plays with Oranmore–Maree and at inter-county level with the Galway senior hurling team.

== Career ==
Burke first played hurling at juvenile and underage levels with the Oranmore–Maree club. He won a Galway MAHC title in 2022, following a 2–13 to 1–12 win over Clarinbridge in the final. Burke made his senior team debut in 2023. He has also lined out for ATU Galway in the Fitzgibbon Cup.

At inter-county level, Burke first appeared for Galway during a two-year tenure with the minor team. He was part of the team beaten by Cork in the 2021 All-Ireland MHC final. Burke immediately progressed to the under-20 team.

Burke made his senior team debut in Galway's National Hurling League campaign in 2025.

== Honours ==
Oranmore–Maree

- Galway Minor A Hurling Championship: 2022
