= Donagh Murphy =

Irish hurler (born 2004)

Personal information
- Native name: Donagh Ó Murchú (Irish)
- Born: 2004 (age 21–22) Borris, County Carlow, Ireland
- Occupation: Student

Sport
- Sport: Hurling
- Position: Left corner-forward
Club
- Years: Club
- 2022-present: Mount Leinster Rangers
Club titles
- Carlow titles: 1
College
- Years: College
- 2023-present: DCU Dóchas Éireann
College titles
- Fitzgibbon titles: 0
Inter-county*
Years	County	Apps (scores)
2024-	Carlow	1 (0-01)
Inter-county titles
- Leinster titles: 0
- All-Irelands: 0
- NHL: 0
- All Stars: 0
- *Inter County team apps and scores correct as of 13:06, 26 May 2024.

Donagh Murphy (born 2004) is an Irish hurler. At club level he plays with Mount Leinster Rangers and at inter-county level with the Carlow senior hurling team.

== Career ==
Murphy began his club career at juvenile and underage levels with the Mount Leinster Rangers club in Borris. He also played with St Kieran's College in Kilkenny and was part of their Dr Croke Cup-winning team in 2023. After progressing to adult club level, Murphy won a Carlow SHC medal with Mount Leinster Rangers after beating St Mullin's in the 2023 final. He has also lined out with DCU Dóchas Éireann in various third level competitions.

Murphy began his inter-county career with Carlow during a two-year tenure with the minor team in 2020 and 2021. He was immediately drafted onto the under-20 team, however, his three seasons in this grade ended without success. Murphy joined the senior team for the 2024 season.

== Honours ==
St Kieran's College

- Dr Croke Cup: 2023

Mount Leinster Rangers

- Carlow Senior Hurling Championship (2): 2023, 2025
- Carlow Under 21 A Hurling Championship (1): 2025
