= 2018 All-Ireland Minor Hurling Championship =

All-Ireland Minor Hurling Championship 2018
Championship Details
- Dates: 12 May 2018 - 19 August 2018
- Teams: 17

All Ireland Champions
- Winners: Galway (12th win)
- Captain: Seán Neary
- Manager: Jeffrey Lynskey

All Ireland Runners-up
- Runners-up: Kilkenny
- Captain: Conor Kelly
- Manager: Richie Mulrooney

Provincial Champions
- Munster: Tipperary
- Leinster: Dublin
- Ulster: Not Played
- Connacht: Not Played

Championship Statistics
- Matches Played: 39
- Top Scorer: Conor Kelly (2-72)

The 2018 All-Ireland Minor Hurling Championship was the 88th staging of the All-Ireland minor hurling championship since its establishment by the Gaelic Athletic Association in 1928. It is the primary inter-county hurling competition for boys aged between fifteen and seventeen. The championship began on 12 May 2018 and ended on 19 August 2018.

Galway were the defending champions and successfully defended the title after a 0-21 to 0-14 win over Kilkenny in the final on 19 August.

The 2018 championship saw the biggest change in format since the introduction of the "back-door system" for beaten provincial finalists in 1997.

== Format changes ==
At the GAA Congress in February 2016, it was decided by vote that the age limit for the inter-county minor championship would be reduced from under-18 to under-17. The motion proposed that all minor players at inter-county level be aged between 15 and 17. The change became effective from 1 January 2018.

At a Special Congress in September 2017, further changes were made to the format of the championship. Under the new format, the championship begins solely on a provincial basis in Munster and Leinster. There will be no Ulster Championship as Ulster teams, as agreed by the Ulster and Leinster Councils, will participate in the Leinster Championship. While it was expected that Galway would also join the Leinster Championship, they will remain as the sole Connacht representatives. They will enter the All-Ireland quarter-finals in a round-robin series with the beaten Leinster and Munster finalists. This will ensure Galway of at least two championship games every season.

== Leinster Minor Hurling Championship ==
=== Tier 1 ===
Tier one is the tier for the highest ranked teams, and operates essentially as a ranking round, as all four teams progress directly to the quarter finals.

==== Tier 1 Table ====
Pos	Team	Pld	W	D	L	SF	SA	Diff	Pts
1	Kilkenny	3	3	0	0	7-70	6-36	37	6
2	Dublin	3	2	0	1	6-49	4-40	15	4
3	Wexford	3	1	0	2	3-43	3-55	-12	2
4	Laois	3	0	0	3	1-37	4-68	-40	0

==== Tier 1 Rounds 1 to 3 ====
12 May 2018 Round 1	Wexford	1-21 - 0-18	Laois	Innovate Wexford Park, Wexford
	AJ Redmond 0-13, O Whitty 1-0, R Lawlor 0-1, J Kehoe 0-1, T Murphy 0-3, P Whitty 0-1, Z Firman 0-1, C Molloy 0-1.	Report	A Kirwan 0-4, M Hennessy 0-4, C Byrne 0-3, C Cosgrove 0-3, T Cuddy 0-2, C O'Shaughnessy 0-1, A Connolly 0-1.

13 May 2018 Round 1	Dublin	4-12 - 3-23	Kilkenny	Parnell Park, Dublin
	L Swan 3-1, L Dunne 1-7 (0-5f, 0-1 '65'), D Purcell 0-2, A O'Neill, P Christie 0-1 each.	Report	C Kelly 0-14 (12f), C Brennan 1-3 (0-1f), G Murphy 1-2, C O'Leary 1-1, J Morrissey 0-2, C Kenny 0-1.	Referee: B Redmond (Wexford)

19 May 2018 Round 2	Kilkenny	3-21 - 1-12	Wexford	Nowlan Park, Kilkenny
	E Guilfoyle (2-2); C Kelly (0-7); D Maher, J Morrissey (0-3 each); G Murphy (1-0); C O'Leary, K Hogan (0-2 each); P Dempsey, C Brennan (0-1 each).	Report	AJ Redmond (0-8); D Cantwell (1-0); R Lawlor, T Murphy, O Whitty, J Kirwan (0-1 each).	Referee: S Stack (Dublin)

19 May 2018 Round 2	Laois	0-07 - 2-21	Dublin	O'Moore Park, Portlaoise
	A Kirwan 0-7 (f).	Report	L Dunne 1-10 (0-9 frees), D Purcell 1-2, C Murray 0-3, L Swan 0-2, A O'Toole, P Christie, C Foley, S Fenton 0-1 each.	Referee: R Fitzsimons (Offaly)

25 May 2018 Round 3	Laois	1-12 - 1-26	Kilkenny	O'Moore Park, Portlaoise
	A Kirwan 0-5 (0-4 frees), C Cosgrove 0-4 (frees), M Hennessy 0-3, C O'Shaughnessy 1-0.	Report	C Kelly 0-8 (0-6 frees, 0-1 65), C Brennan 0-5, D Maher 0-4, C Kenny, E Guilfoyle 0-3 each, N Higgins 1-0, J Doyle 0-2, J Young 0-1.	Referee: G McGrath (Wexford)

27 May 2018 Round 3	Dublin	0-16 - 1-10	Wexford	Parnell Park, Dublin
	D Leavy 0-4, S Fenton 0-3 (0-1f), C Foley, S Foran 0-2 each, C Hogan, A O’Neill (0-1 ‘65’), D Power, D McLoughney, A O’Toole 0-1 each.	Report	AJ Redmond 1-4 (0-3f, 0-1 ‘65’), C Molloy (0-2f), J Kehoe (0-2f) 0-2 each, T Murphy, Z Firman 0-1 each.	Referee: A Devine (Westmeath)

=== Tier 2 ===
Tier 2 represents the teams ranked 5 to 8 in the competition. The winner of this tier joins the four Tier 1 teams directly in the quarter final, while the remaining three teams progress to 'Preliminary Quarter-finals' to face the three Tier 3 teams.

==== Tier 2 Table ====
Pos	Team	Pld	W	D	L	SF	SA	Diff	Pts
1	Offaly	3	3	0	0	9-69	1-38	45	6
2	Kildare	3	2	0	1	3-38	4-34	1	4
3	Antrim	3	1	0	2	5-34	4-45	-8	2
4	Meath	3	0	0	3	0-37	5-60	-38	0

==== Tier 2 Rounds 1 to 3 ====
12 May 2018 Round 1	Meath	0-13 - 4-23	Offaly	St. Loman's Park, Trim
	I Bermingham 0-4, M Cole 0-3, C Sherlock 0-3, K Bawle 0-2, D O'Sullivan 0-1.	Report	C Kiely 1-7, DJ McLoughlin 1-3, C Sampson 0-6, D Flanagan 1-2, C Teehan 1-2, D Maher 0-1, C Donoghue 0-1, E Gleeson 0-1.	Referee: T Gleeson

12 May 2018 Round 1	Kildare	2-17 - 4-07	Antrim	St. Conleth's Park, Newbridge
	M Curtin 0-7f, M McGovern 1-1, F O’Sullivan 1-0, S Whyte 0-3, C McCabe 0-2, C Boran, H Dunne, D Melville and D Hanafin 0-1 each.	Report	C Bohill 1-2 (2f), M McGarry, E McGrath and C O’Connor 1-0 each, N O’Connor and D McKeogh 0-2 each, R McFarlane 0-1 each.

19 May 2018 Round 2	Offaly	3-19 - 0-14	Kildare	O'Connor Park, Tullamore
	C Kiely 1-11 (5 f), D Flanagan and C Sampson 1-1 each, DJ McLoughlin 0-3, C Donoghue 0-2, C Teehan 0-1.	Report	M Curtin 0-8 (4f & 0-1 '65'), C Boran 0-2, M McGovern, C McCabe, H Dunne and D Melville 0-1 each.	Referee: B Nea

19 May 2018 Round 2	Meath	0-11 - 0-16	Antrim	St. Brigid's Park, Newry
		Report	R Hill (0–4), R McAteer (0–4), R McFarline (0–2), C Bohill (0–2), E McGrath (0–2), N O’Connor (0–1), C O’Connor (0–1).

25 May 2018 Round 3	Meath	0-13 - 1-21	Kildare	St. Conleth's Park, Newbridge
	J Murray 0-6f, D O’Sullivan, I Bermingham and J Ryan 0-2 each, C Sherlock 0-1 each.	Report	M Curtin 0-7(4f), S Whyte 0-5, F O’Sullivan 1-2, M McGovern and R Stapleton 0-2 each, H Dunne, L Dempsey and J Higgins 0-1 each.

27 May 2018 Round 3	Offaly	2-17 - 1-11	Antrim	Dowdallshill
	C Kiely 1-9 (0-7f); DJ McLoughlin 1-1; D Flanagan and A Walsh 0-2 each; E Gleeson, D Maher (65) and C Sampson 0-1 each.	Report	R Hill 1-5 (1-0 pen, 0-5f); C Mohill 0-3 (3f); R McAleer 0-2; N O'Connor 0-1.	Referee: T Gleeson (Dublin)

=== Tier 3 ===
tier 3 is for the teams ranked 9 to 11, and operates essentially as a ranking round, as all three teams progress to the 'Preliminary Quarter-finals'.

==== Tier 3 Table ====
Pos	Team	Pld	W	D	L	SF	SA	Diff	Pts
1	Westmeath	2	2	0	0	10-33	1-13	47	4
2	Carlow	2	1	0	1	3-32	4-22	7	2
3	Down	2	0	0	2	3-11	11-41	-54	0

==== Tier 3 Rounds 1 to 3 ====
12 May 2018 Round 1	Westmeath	2-15 - 0-09	Carlow	TEG Cusack Park, Mullingar
	E Daly (0-9, 6f), D Devine (2-1), D Core (0-2), P Nangle (0-1), D Ennis (0-1), D McGrath (0-1).	Report	C Kavanagh (0-4, 3f), D Tobin (0-2), R Whelan (0-2f), J Smithers (0-1).	Referee: C Mooney

19 May 2018 Round 2	Westmeath	8-18 - 1-04	Down	Gaelic Grounds, Drogheda
	S Williams 3-1; D Devine; J Dillon 2-5 each; D McGrath 1-1; C Egan 0-2; C Fenlon, J Coffey, L Moore, D Hickey 0-1 each.	Report	S Hughes 1-0; L Hogan; C Watson; K Coulter; I Hussein 0-1 each	Referee: S Guinan (Offaly)

25 May 2018 Round 3	Carlow	3-23 - 2-07	Down	Longwood

=== Leinster Preliminary Quarter-Finals ===
Six of the seven teams in Tiers 2 and 3 play off with the winner of Tier 2 receiving a bye. The three winning teams from the preliminary quarter-finals plus the Tier 2 winners advance to the quarter-finals.

2 June 2018 Preliminary quarter-final	Westmeath	1-18 - 1-11	Meath	TEG Cusack Park, Mullingar
	D Ennis 0-6, S Williams 1-3 (0-1f), D Devine 0-5 (5f), J Coll 0-2, D Hickey, L Moore 0-1 each.	Report	C Sherlock 1-1, I Bermingham, D Farrell 0-3 each, M Cole 0-2 (2fs), J Murray, N McNally 0-1 each.	Referee: R Fitzsimons (Offaly)

2 June 2018 Preliminary quarter-final	Carlow	1-12 - 3-08	Antrim	Abbotstown

2 June 2018 Preliminary quarter-final	Down	0-01 - 2-15	Kildare	Abbotstown
	C Coulter 0-1.	Report	M Curtin 0-7 (6f), D Melville, J Cleary 1-1 each, L Dempsey, S Whyte 0-2 each, F O'Sullivan, H Dunne 0-1 each.	Referee: T Gleeson (Dublin)

=== Leinster Quarter-finals ===
16 June 2018 Quarter-final	Offaly	2-19 - 1-14	Laois	O'Connor Park, Tullamore
	C Kiely 0-12 (10f); C Sampson 2-5; C Donoghue, C Teehan 0-1 each.	Report	A Kirwan 1-6 (5f); C Cosgrove 1-4f; C Byrne 0-2; M Hennessy and A Connolly 0-1 each.	Referee: G McGrath (Wexford)

16 June 2018 Quarter-final	Kildare	0-12 - 2-21	Wexford	St. Conleth's Park, Newbridge
	M Curtin 0-5 (3f); L Dempsey 0-4 (3f, 1 sideline); C Boran, S Whyte and F O'Sullivan 0-1 each.	Report	AJ Redmond 2-5 (1-0 pen, 5fs); C Molloy 0-5 (3f, 1 '65); Z Firman 0-4; J Kirwan and O Whitty 0-2 each; R Lawlor, J Kehoe and J Sheil 0-1 each.	Referee: C Mooney (Dublin)

16 June 2018 Quarter-final	Antrim	0-04 - 3-16	Dublin	Dowdallshill
	R Hill 0-3 (2f, 1 '65'), C Bohill 0-1.	Report	D Purcell 1-4 (2f), S Fenton 1-3, L Swan 1-2, P Christie 0-3, L Dunne 0-2 (1f, 1 '65'), A O'Neill (1f), B McSweeney 0-1 each.	Referee: R Fitzsimons (Offaly)

16 June 2018 Quarter-final	Westmeath	1-05 - 5-28	Kilkenny	Cusack Park, Mullingar
	D Ennis 0-4, J Gillen 1-0, C McClair 0-1.	Report	C Kelly 0-13 (4f, 1'65); J Buggy 2-1; C Kenny, C Brennan 0-5 each; E Guilfoyle, C O'Leary 1-1 each; G Murphy 1-0; K Rudkins, J Doyle 0-1 each.	Referee: T Gleeson (Dublin)

=== Leinster Semi-finals ===
23 June 2018 Semi-final	Offaly	3-13 - 0-24	Kilkenny	O'Connor Park, Tullamore
	C Kiely 0-6 (4fs, 1 s-l), C Teehan, DJ McLoughlin 1-1 each, C Donoghue, D Maher 0-2 each, C Sampson 0-1f.	Report	C Kelly 0-12 (10fs), C Brennan 0-5, E Guilfoyle, C Kenny 0-2 each, D Maher, G Murphy, J Doyle 0-1 each.	Referee: C Mooney (Dublin)

23 June 2018 Semi-final	Wexford	3-13 - 1-22	Dublin	Innovate Wexford Park, Wexford
	A J Redmond 0-7 (6fs, 1 sl), D Hayes (1f), R Lawlor, J Sheil 1-0 each, D Furlong 0-3, T Murphy, O Whitty, Z Firman 0-1 each.	Report	L Dunne 0-12 (8fs, 2 '65s'), L Swan 1-0, D Purcell 0-4, C Foley 0-2, A O'Neill, D Leavy, P Christie, C Murray 0-1 each. Wexford:

=== Leinster Final ===
30 June 2018 Final	Dublin	6-19 - 7-12	Kilkenny	O'Moore Park, Portlaoise
	L Dunne 2-8 (6f, 1 '65); L Swan 3-1; C Murray 1-2; D Purcell (1f), C Foley 0-3 each; D Leavy, P Christie 0-1 each.	Report av av	C Kelly 2-3 (3f); C O'Leary 1-2; C Kenny, G Murphy 1-1 each, K Hogan, J Buggy 1-0 each; D Maher, C Brennan 0-2 each; E Guilfoyle 0-1.	Referee: R Fitzsimons (Offaly); Man of the Match: L Swan (Dublin)

== Munster Minor Hurling Championship ==
=== Munster Table ===
Pos	Team	Pld	W	D	L	SF	SA	Diff	Pts
1	Limerick	4	3	0	1	4-71	6-63	2	6
2	Tipperary	4	2	0	2	11-50	5-55	13	4
3	Cork	4	2	0	2	4-73	10-53	2	4
4	Waterford	4	2	0	2	8-49	10-60	-17	4
5	Clare	4	1	0	3	9-63	5-75	0	2
Green background The top 2 teams contest the Munster Final.

=== Round 1 ===
20 May 2018 Round 1	Cork	0-26 - 3-13	Clare	Páirc Uí Chaoimh, Cork
	E Murphy (0-8, 0-6 frees, 0-1 65), A Connolly (0-2 frees) and S Barrett (0-4 each), P O’Flynn (0-3), C O’Brien (free), C O’Donovan, O Broderick, P Cooney, D Hogan, P Power and C Hickey.	Report	M Rodgers (2-2), G O’Grady (1-1), K Guyler (0-3, 0-2 frees), A Moriarty and W Halpin (0-2 each), D Healy, F Slattery and S Meehan (0-1 each).	Referee: K Jordan (Tipperary)

20 May 2018 Round 1	Limerick	1-17 - 2-12	Tipperary	Gaelic Grounds, Limerick
	C O’Neill 0-10 (0-3f, 0-1 65), C Ryan 1-1, C Coughlan 0-3, B Purcell 0-2, B Nix 0-1.	Report	S Hayes 2-1, R Renehan 0-3 (1 sideline, 1 penalty), K O’Kelly 0-2, J Devanney 0-2, J Campion 0-2, J Ryan 0-1, M O’Shea 0-1.	Referee: N Wall (Cork)

=== Round 2 ===
27 May 2018 Round 2	Tipperary	4-15 - 1-13	Cork	Semple Stadium, Thurles
	J Devaney 1-5 (0-4 frees), S Hayes 1-2, K Maher, D Ryan 1-1 each, M Hackett 0-3, J Morrissey 0-2, J Campion 0-1.	Report	P Power 0-4, C O’Brien (frees), D Hogan (0-1 free) 0-3 each, A Mulcahy 1-0, E Murphy (frees), S Barrett 0-2 each.	Referee: T Walsh (Waterford)

27 May 2018 Round 2	Clare	3-21 - 2-14	Waterford	Cusack Park, Ennis
	M Rodgers 2-3; K Guyler 1-4 (1-0 Pen, 3f); D Healy (3f), C Hegarty 0-3 each; W Halpin, S Meehan, R Mounsey 0-2 each; J Minogue, A Moriarty 0-1 each.	Report	P Leevy 0-7 (6f); C Mac Craith 1-1; J Power 1-0; C Keating, A Organ 0-2 each; C Kavanagh, O Ó Ceallaigh 0-1 each.	Referee: J McCormack (Tipperary)

=== Round 3 ===
2 June 2018 Round 3	Cork	0-17 - 1-20	Limerick	Páirc Uí Chaoimh, Cork
	J Cahalane 0-6 (frees), C O’Brien 0-4 (0-3 frees), E Twomey, P Power (0-1 free) 0-2 each, O Broderick, D Hogan, F O’Leary 0-1 each.	Report	C O’Neill 0-11 (0-7 frees, 0-1 65), C Ryan 1-1, D Hegarty 0-3, E O’Mahony, P Kirby 0-2 each, C Coughlan 0-1.	Referee: J Mullins (Clare)

3 June 2018 Round 3	Waterford	2-13 - 3-09	Tipperary	Gaelic Grounds, Limerick
	M Kiely 2-5 (2fs, 2 65s), C Mac Craith (1 s-l), C Keating 0-2 each, P Leavy (f), D Byrne, C Kavanagh, G Fives 0-1 each.	Report	J Devaney 0-7 (6fs), S Hayes 2-0, D Ryan 1-0, K O’Kelly 0-2.	Referee: R McGann (Clare)

=== Round 4 ===
10 June 2018 Round 4	Limerick	1-13 - 2-17	Waterford	Gaelic Grounds, Limerick
	C O’Neill 1-4 (3fs), B Purcell 0-3, P Kirby, B O’Connor 0-2 each, M Martin, C Ryan 0-1 each.	Report	M Kiely (3fs, 1 65), C MacCraith (1 s-l) 0-5 each, D Byrne, G Corbett 1-0 each, J Power 0-3, O Ó Ceallaigh 0-2, S Fitzgerald, C Kavanagh 0-1.	Referee: S Stokes (Cork)

10 June 2018 Round 4	Tipperary	2-14 - 1-12	Clare	Semple Stadium, Thurles
	J Devaney 0-7 (6f, 1’65); C O’Farrell, S Hayes 1-1 each; M Hackett, D Ryan 0-2 each; J Morrissey 0-1	Report	K Guyler 0-7 (6f); M Rodgers 1-1; W Halpin 0-2; D Healy 0-1 (1’65), C Hegarty 0-1 each	Referee: M Sexton (Limerick)

=== Round 5 ===
17 June 2018 Round 5	Clare	2-17 - 1-21	Limerick	Cusack Park, Ennis
	K Guyler 0-9 (3f, 1’65); M Rodgers 2-1; R Mounsey 0-3; C Hegarty 0-2; W Halpin, T Butler 0-1 each.	Report	C O’Neill 0-7 (1f, 3’65); B Purcell 0-6; C Ryan 1-0; D O’Leary, C Coughlan 0-2 each; B O’Connor, P Kirby, D Hegarty, E McEvoy 0-1 each.	Referee: M Maher (Cork)

17 June 2018 Round 5	Waterford	2-05 - 3-17	Cork	Semple Stadium, Thurles
	C Keating 1-2, O O’Gorman 1-0, M Kiely 0-2 (frees), A Organ 0-1.	Report	S Barrett 2-2, P Power 1-2, J Cahalane 0-5 (frees), D Flynn, A Connolly, C Hickey 0-2 each, E Twomey, C McCarthy 0-1 each.	Referee: P Kelly (Tipperary)

=== Munster Final ===
1 July 2018 Final	Tipperary	1-20 - 1-12	Limerick	Semple Stadium, Thurles
	J Devaney 0-8 (4f, 1 '65'); S Hayes 1-3; S Phelan, C O'Farrell, R Renehan (1sl) 0-2 each; K O'Kelly, M Hackett, M O'Shea 0-1 each.	Report	C O'Neill 0-6 (5f); C Ryan 0-3; B Nix 1-0; P Kirby, B O'Connor, B Purcell 0-1 each.	Referee: T Walsh (Waterford); Man of the Match: J Devaney (Tipperary)

== All-Ireland Minor Hurling Championship ==
=== Quarter-Final Group Stage ===
==== Quarter-Final Group Table ====
Pos	Team	Pld	W	D	L	SF	SA	Diff	Pts
1	Galway	2	2	0	0	2-41	2-23	+18	4
2	Kilkenny	2	1	0	1	5-33	2-33	+9	2
3	Limerick	2	0	0	2	1-24	4-42	-27	0
Green background The top two teams advanced to the All-Ireland semi-finals.

==== Quarter-Final Rounds 1 to 3 ====
8 July 2018 Round 1	Galway	1-20 - 0-12	Limerick	Semple Stadium, Thurles
	Donal O'Shea 1-5 (0-3fs, 0-1 '65'), Kealan Creaven 0-3, Diarmuid Kilcommins, Jason O'Donoghue, Colm Cunningham, Dean Reilly 0-2 each, Adam Brett, Oisin Flannery (St. Thomas'), Oisin Flannery (Padraig Pearses'), Sean Neary 0-1 each	Report	Cathal O'Neill 0-8 (6fs), Michéal Martin, Cormac Ryan, Bob Purcell, E McEvoy 0-1 each.	Referee: S Stack (Dublin)

15 July 2018 Round 2	Kilkenny	2-11 - 1-21	Galway	Semple Stadium, Thurles
	C Kelly 0-7 (4f, 2 '65), C O'Leary 1-1, C Brennan 1-0, G Murphy 0-2, J Young 0-1.	Report	D O'Shea 0-10 (9f, 1'65), D Reilly 1-4, O Flannery (Padraig Pearses), J O'Donoghue, D Kilcommins 0-2 each, K Creaven 0-1.	Referee: C Canning (Antrim)

21 July 2018 Round 3	Kilkenny	3-22 - 1-12	Limerick	Semple Stadium, Thurles
	C Kelly (0-8, eight frees), J Morrissey (2-1), K Hogan (1-1), J Buggy (0-3), C Kenny (0-2); C Brennan (0-2), G Murphy (0-2); J Harkin (0-1); C O’Leary (0-1), D Coogan (0-1).	Report	C O’Neill (0-8, seven frees, one ‘65’), B Nix (1-0), B O’Connor (0-1), C Ryan (0-1), E O’Mahony (0-1), E McEvoy (0-1).	Referee: S Hynes (Galway)

=== Semi-finals ===
28 July 2018 Semi-final	Dublin	0-16 - 3-22	Galway	Croke Park, Dublin
	Liam Dunne 0-10 (10f), Conor Murray, Pearce Christie, Ciaran Foley, Dara Purcell, Aaron O'Toole, Daragh McLoughney 0-1 each	Report	Donal O'Shea 0-12 (11f, 1'65), Dean Reilly 1-3, Niall Collins 1-2, Adam Brett 1-1, Diarmuid Kilcommins 0-2, Jason O'Donoghue 0-1, Oisin Flannery (St. Thomas') 0-1	Referee: Patrick Murphy (Carlow)

29 July 2018 Semi-final	Tipperary	2-10 - 1-15	Kilkenny	Croke Park, Dublin
	Mikey O'Shea 2-1, Devon Ryan 0-3 (1f), Conor Whelan 0-2 (2f), Sean Hayes, James Devaney, Jack Morrissey, Jack Lanigan 0-1 each	Report	Ciaran Brennan 1-2, Jack Buggy (2f), Jack Morrissey 0-4 each, Dan Coogan, Cathal O'Leary, Conor Kelly (1f), Killian Hogan, Eoin Guilfoyle 0-1 each	Referee: Rory McGann (Clare)

=== Final ===
19 August 2018 Final	Galway	0-21 - 0-14	Kilkenny	Croke Park, Dublin
13:15	Donal O'Shea 0-10 (6fs, 1 65, 1 pen), Dean Reilly 0-3, Diarmuid Kilcommons 0-2, Sean McDonagh 0-2, Oisin Flannery (Padraig Pearses) 0-1, Oisin Flannery (St Thomas') 0-1, Colm Cunningham 0-1, Evan Duggan 0-1.	Report	Conor Kelly 0-7 (7fs), Darragh Maher 0-2, Ciaran Brennan 0-2 (0-1 sideline), Cian Kenny 0-2, Jack Buggy 0-1 (1 sideline).	Referee: Johnny Murphy (Limerick)

== Statistics ==
=== Top scorers ===
Overall

Rank	Player	Club	Tally	Total	Matches	Average
1	Conor Kelly	Kilkenny	2-72	78	8	9.75
2	Cathal O'Neill	Limerick	1-54	57	7	8.14
3	Cathal Kiely	Offaly	3-45	54	5	10.80
4	Liam Dunne	Dublin	4-39	51	5	10.20
5	A. J. Redmond	Wexford	3-37	46	5	9.20
6	Donal O'Shea	Galway	1-37	37	4	9.25
7	Muiris Curtin	Kildare	0-34	34	5	6.80
8	James Devaney	Tipperary	1-29	32	5	6.40
9	Luke Swan	Dublin	8-06	30	6	5.00
10	Ciarán Brennan	Kilkenny	2-23	29	8	3.62

In a single game

Rank	Player	Club	Tally	Total	Opposition
1	Liam Dunne	Dublin	2-08	14	Kilkenny
1	Cathal Kiely	Offaly	1-11	14	Kildare
1	Conor Kelly	Kilkenny	0-14	14	Dublin
4	Liam Dunne	Dublin	1-10	13	Laois
4	Conor Kelly	Kilkenny	0-13	13	Westmeath
4	A. J. Redmond	Wexford	0-13	13	Laois
7	Cathal Kiely	Offaly	1-09	12	Antrim
7	Cathal Kiely	Offaly	0-12	12	Laois
7	Liam Dunne	Dublin	0-12	12	Wexford
7	Conor Kelly	Kilkenny	0-12	12	Offaly
7	Donal O'Shea	Galway	0-12	12	Dublin

== Awards ==
Team of the Year
