= Aaron Niland =

Irish hurler (born 2006)

Personal information
- Native name: Aron Ó Nialláin (Irish)
- Born: 2006 (age 19–20) Clarinbridge, County Galway, Ireland
- Occupation: Student

Sport
- Sport: Hurling
- Position: Right corner-forward
Club
- Years: Club
- 2024-present: Clarinbridge
Club titles
- Galway titles: 0
College
- Years: College
- 2025-present: University of Galway
College titles
- Fitzgibbon titles: 0
Inter-county*
Years	County	Apps (scores)
2026-	Galway	6 (1-43)
Inter-county titles
- Leinster titles: 1
- All-Irelands: 0
- NHL: 0
- All Stars: 0
- *Inter County team apps and scores correct as of 19:28, 26 January 2026.

Aaron Niland (born 2006) is an Irish hurler. At club level he plays with Clarinbridge and at inter-county level with the Galway senior hurling team.

== Career ==
Niland played hurling at all grades as a student at the Presentation College in Athenry. He was part of the school's senior hurling team that won three Connacht PPS SAHC titles in four years between 2022 and 2025. He later lined out with the University of Galway. At club level, Niland plays with Clarinbridge.

At inter-county level, Niland first appeared for Galway during a two-year tenure with the minor team. He was part of the team beaten by Clare in the 2023 All-Ireland MHC final, while also ending the campaign as top scorer. Niland immediately progressed to the under-20 team.

Niland was added to the senior team in 2026, and made his debut in Galway's National Hurling League defeat by Tipperary.

== Career statistics ==
As of 26 April 2026

Team	Year	National League			Leinster		All-Ireland		Total	
Team	Year	Division	Apps	Score	Apps	Score	Apps	Score	Apps	Score
Galway	2026	Division 1A	6	0-37	4	1-30	2	0-13	12	1-80
Career total			6	0-37	4	1-30	2	0-13	12	1-80

== Honours ==
Presentation College, Athenry

- Connacht Colleges Senior Hurling Championship: 2022, 2023, 2025

Galway

- Leinster Senior Hurling Championship: 2026
- Leinster Under-20 Hurling Championship: 2026
- Leinster Minor Hurling Championship: 2023
