= 2020 All-Ireland Minor Hurling Championship =

All-Ireland Minor Hurling Championship 2020
Championship Details
- Dates: 17 October 2020 - 10 July 2021
- Teams: 16

All Ireland Champions
- Winners: Galway (14th win)
- Captain: Adam Nolan
- Manager: Brian Hanley

All Ireland Runners-up
- Runners-up: Kilkenny
- Captain: Timmy Clifford
- Manager: Richie Mulrooney

Provincial Champions
- Munster: Limerick
- Leinster: Kilkenny
- Ulster: Not Played
- Connacht: Not Played

Championship Statistics
- Matches Played: 15
- Total Goals: 32 (2.13 per game)
- Total Points: 467 (31.13 per game)
- Top Scorer: Lochlainn Quinn (1-42)

The 2020 All-Ireland Minor Hurling Championship was the 90th staging of the All-Ireland Minor Hurling Championship since its establishment by the Gaelic Athletic Association in 1928. The championship was due to take place between April and August 2020, however, due to the impact of the COVID-19 pandemic on Gaelic games, new provincial draws and formats were adopted. The championship eventually began on 17 October 2020, however, it was confirmed four days later that the championship was once again being suspended. The championship ended on 10 July 2021.

Galway entered the championship as the defending champions in search of a fourth successive title.

On 10 July 2021, Galway won the championship after a 1-17 to 1-14 defeat of Kilkenny in the All-Ireland final. This was their 14th title overall and a record-breaking fourth title in succession.

Offaly's Lochlainn Quinn was the championship's top scorer with 1-42.

== Format changes ==
On 29 June 2020, the Munster Council announced that they were abandoning the round robin for one year and reverting to a straight knockout format. Kerry joined the championship for the first time since 2014. A day later, the Leinster Council also announced a new format and fixtures. The changes saw the adoption of a straight knockout format, while the championship was also spilt in two with the top 9 teams in the province participating. The four "weakest" teams contested the Leinster Minor B Championship. The All-Ireland quarter-final round robin was also abandoned, with the Leinster champions receiving a bye to the All-Ireland final, while the Munster champions will play Galway in a lone semi-final.

== Leinster Minor Hurling Championship ==
=== Fixtures/results ===
==== Leinster round 1 ====
17 October 2020 Round 1	Offaly	2-18 - 0-12	Laois	St. Brendan's Park
	L Quinn 0-15 (twelve frees), C Mitchell 2-0, L Carey 0-2, C Egan 0-1.	Report	C Dunne 0-4 (all frees), P Brennan 0-3 (one free), D Dooley 0-1, D Dooley 0-1, N Quinlan 0-1, C Byrne 0-1, D Bowe 0-1.	Referee: C Flynn (Meath)

17 October 2020 Round 1	Westmeath	1-15 - 1-14	Carlow	Kinnegad
		Report

17 October 2020 Round 1	Antrim	0-07 - 1-13	Kildare	Abbotstown GAA Centre of Excellence
	F McQuillan 0-4 (3 frees), P McKillop 0-1 (free), E McFerran 0-1, A Scullion 0-1.	Report	C Kehoe 0-8 (8 fres), C Sheridan 1-0, C Treacy 0-2, C Boran 0-1, F Maher 0-1, K Harrington 0-1.	Referee: M Ryan (Dublin)

==== Leinster quarter-finals ====
13 December 2020 Quarter-final	Westmeath	1-12 - 1-09	Dublin	TEG Cusack Park
	E Cunneen 0-9 (0-4f, 0-3 '65', 0-1 sline), M Cunningham 1-0, D McCormack, D Williams, B McGrath 0-1 each.	Report	T Brennan, N Hogan (0-3f) 0-3 each, D O Dulaing 1-0, N Clerkin (0-1f), D Peel, J O'Brien 0-1 each.	Referee: A Kinahan (Offaly)

13 December 2020 Quarter-final	Kildare	0-09 - 1-18	Offaly	St. Conleth's Park
	C Kehoe 0-6 (4f and 2 '65s', C Flanagan, A Tobin and C Sheridan 0-1 each.	Report	L Quinn 0-10 (7f), L Carey 0-3, C Egan 1-0, C Mitchell and J Hoctor 0-2 each, C King 0-1.	Referee: B Redmond (Wexford)

==== Leinster semi-finals ====
20 December 2020 Semi-final	Westmeath	1-08 - 2-18	Offaly	TEG Cusack Park
	E Cunneen 0-5 (3f), D Williams 1-0, C Dowd 0-2, D McCormack 0-1.	Report	L Quinn 0-11 (5f; 1 65’), L Carey 1-3, D Bourke 1-0, C Mitchell 0-2, E Murphy and C Egan 0-1 each.	Referee: C Mooney (Dublin)

20 December 2020 Semi-final	Wexford	1-14 - 0-23	Kilkenny	Chadwicks Wexford Park
	C Byrne 0-7, 4 frees, 1 sideline cut; L Murphy 1-1; C Foley 0-2; O Pepper, J J Twamley, L Roche, S O'Hagan, C Byrne-Dunbar 0-1 each.	Report	B Drennan (0-14, 9 frees), K Doyle, G Dunne, 0-2 each; C Beirne, T Clifford, D Walsh, H Shrine 0-1 each.	Referee: S Guinan (Offaly)

==== Leinster final ====
3 July 2021 Final	Offaly	3-09 - 2-21	Kilkenny	MW Hire O'Moore Park
	L Quinn 1-6 (0-4f, 0-2 65s), L Carey 1-1 (1-0 pen), L Hogan 1-0, D Bourke, A Landy 0-1 each.	Report	B Drennan 0-13 (0-12f), H Shine 1-3, D Walsh 1-1, T Dunne, B Reid, C Beirne, T Clifford 0-1 each.	Referee: C Daly (Kildare)

== Munster Minor Hurling Championship ==
=== Fixtures/results ===
==== Munster quarter-finals ====
17 October 2020 Quarter-final	Cork	1-24 - 2-13	Clare	Semple Stadium
	B Cunningham 0-9 (0-3 f, 0-2 65, 0-1 sl), J Leahy 0-4, C Walsh 1-1, A Quirke, B Keating, W Buckley 0-2 each, T O'Connell, E Downey, E O'Leary, M Howell 0-1 each.	Report	J Collins 1-6 (1-5 f, 0-1 65), O'Donnell 1-1 (1-0 f), N O'Farrell 0-2 f, S Rynne, E Guilfoyle, J Guyler, K O'Connor 0-1 each.	Referee: J McCormack (Tipperary)

18 October 2020 Quarter-final	Kerry	0-09 - 0-32	Tipperary	LIT Gaelic Grounds
	R Walsh 0-6 (0-4 frees), R Monaghan, C Keating, K Molloy 0-1 each.	Report	P McGarry 0-6 (0-2 frees), S Ferncombe 0-6 (0-2 ‘65s, 0-2 frees), T Cahill 0-5, S Kenneally, J Leamy 0-3 each, D Stakelum, C McCormack, L Shanahan 0-2 each, D Fogarty, C McKelvey, D Minogue 0-1 each.	Referee: N Malone (Clare)

==== Munster semi-finals ====
12 December 2020 Semi-final	Limerick	2-19 - 0-13	Cork	Semple Stadium
	A English (2-3); L Lynch (0-7, 6 frees); P O’Donovan (0-4); L O’Connor (0-2); S O’Brien, J Keating, J Kirby (0-1 each).	Report	B Cunningham (0-8, frees); M Mullins, J Leahy, B O’Connor, B Keating, E O’Leary (0-1 each).	Referee: K Jordan (Tipperary)

12 December 2020 Semi-final	Waterford	0-12 - 2-14	Tipperary	Páirc Uí Rinn
	P Fitzgerald (0-7, 5 frees, 1 ’65), J Booth (0-2), C Treen, S Callaghan and L Ó Síothcháin (0-1 each).	Report	J Leamy (1-3, 2 frees), K Lee (1-1), S Ferncombe (0-3, 2 frees, 1 ’65), S Kenneally and P McGarry (1 free) (0-2 each), T Cahill and C McKelvey (0-1 each).	Referee: S Stokes (Cork)

==== Munster final ====
20 December 2020 Final	Limerick	2-22 - 0-25 (aet)	Tipperary	Gaelic Grounds
	L Lynch (0-10 frees), A English (0-5), P O’Donovan (1-1), S O’Brien (0-4), E Harmon (1-0), J Keating and J Kirby (0-1 each).	Report	J Leamy (0-10 frees), P McGarry (0-4, 0-3 65s), D Fogarty (0-3), T Cahill, L Shanahan and S Kenneally (0-2 each), D Stakelum and K Lee (0-1 each).	Referee: R McGann (Clare)

== All-Ireland Minor Hurling Championship ==
=== Fixtures ===
==== All-Ireland semi-final ====
2 July 2021 Semi-final	Galway	4-18 - 0-15	Limerick	Cusack Park
	L Collins (2-7, 3f, 2 ‘65), C Molloy (0-5), R Davitt (1-1), G Lee (1-1), C Slattery (0-2), G Thomas (0-2).	Report	L Lynch (0-6, 5f, 1 ‘65), S O’Brien (0-3), P O’Donovan (0-2), A English (0-2), C Scully (0-1), J Fitzgerald (0-1).	Referee: T Walsh (Waterford)

==== All-Ireland final ====
10 July 2021 Final	Galway	1-17 - 1-14	Kilkenny	MW Hire O'Moore Park
	L Collins 1-7 (4f, 1 65), C Molloy 0-3, G Lee 0-2, R Davitt 0-1, L Leen 0-1, K Hanrahan 0-1, D Davoren 0-1, G Thomas 0-1.	Report	B Drennan 1-6 (1-0 pen, 0-5 f), J Fitzpatrick 0-2, D Walsh 0-2, K Doyle 0-1, H Shine 0-1, T Dunne 0-1 and C Beirne 0-1.	Referee: S Stack (Dublin)

== Statistics ==
=== Top scorers ===
Top scorer overall

Rank	Player	Club	Tally	Total	Matches	Average
1	Lochlainn Quinn	Offaly	1-42	45	4	11.25
2	Billy Drennan	Kilkenny	1-33	36	3	12.00
3	Éamonn Cunneen	Westmeath	0-25	25	3	8.33
4	Liam Collins	Galway	3-14	23	2	11.50
4	Liam Lynch	Limerick	0-23	23	3	7.66
6	Jack Leamy	Tipperary	1-16	19	3	6.33
7	Ben Cunningham	Cork	0-17	17	2	8.50
8	Adam English	Limerick	2-10	16	3	5.33
9	Luke Carey	Offaly	2-09	15	4	3.75
10	Conn Kehoe	Kildare	0-14	14	2	7.00

In a single game

Rank	Player	Club	Tally	Total	Opposition
1	Lochlann Quinn	Offaly	0-15	15	Laois
2	Billy Drennan	Kilkenny	0-14	14	Wexford
2	Lochlann Quinn	Offaly	0-14	14	Westmeath
4	Billy Drennan	Kilkenny	0-13	13	Offaly
4	Liam Collins	Galway	2-07	13	Limerick
6	Éamonn Cunneen	Westmeath	0-11	11	Carlow
7	Jake Doyle	Carlow	1-07	10	Westmeath
7	Liam Collins	Galway	1-07	10	Kilkenny
7	Lochlann Quinn	Offaly	0-10	10	Kildare
7	Jack Leamy	Tipperary	0-10	10	Limerick
7	Liam Lynch	Limerick	0-10	10	Tipperary

== Miscellaneous ==
- Galway were looking to become the first county at minor level to win four consecutive All-Ireland titles.

== Awards ==
Team of the Year

1. Tomás Lynch
2. Zach Bay Hammond
3. Adam Nolan
4. Michael Walsh
5. Joe Fitzpatrick
6. Tiernan Killeen
7. Luke Shanahan
8. Liam Leen
9. Éamonn Cunneen
10. Lochlann Quinn
11. Adam English
12. Billy Drennan
13. Shane O'Brien
14. Liam Collins
15. Colm Molloy
