= Cashel Community School =

Secondary school in County Tipperary, Ireland

Coordinates: 52.518°N 7.881°W

Information
- School type: Secondary school
- Established: 1994; 31 years ago

Cashel Community School is secondary school and special needs school in Cashel, County Tipperary in Ireland.

== History ==
Cashel Community School was established in 1994 through the amalgamation of three existing schools: the Presentation Sisters’ Scoil Mhuire, the Christian Brothers Secondary School, and the Cashel Vocational School. Officially opened in 1997 by Minister for Education Niamh Bhreathnach, the school provides a comprehensive curriculum within the framework of community education and operates under the motto Foghlaim is Firinne (“Learning and Truth”).

== Sport ==
The school is actively involved in sports competitions including football and hurling. On 3 February 2015 they defeated CBS Sexton Street of Limerick 4–5 on penalties after a 1–1 draw after extra time to reach the Umbro Senior Boys Cup Final.

== Notable alumni ==
- Angela Kerins (née MacCarthy; born 1956) - business person (Presentation Convent)
- John Gallagher (Current Principal)
