= 2023 All-Ireland Minor Hurling Championship =

2023 hurling competition for players under the age of 17

All-Ireland Minor Hurling Championship 2023
Championship Details
- Dates: 21 March - 4 June 2023
- Teams: 19

All Ireland Champions
- Winners: Clare (2nd win)
- Captain: Eoghan Gunning
- Manager: Brian O'Connell

All Ireland Runners-up
- Runners-up: Galway
- Captain: Seán Murphy
- Manager: Fergal Healy

Provincial Champions
- Munster: Clare
- Leinster: Galway
- Ulster: Antrim
- Connacht: Not Played

Championship Statistics
- Matches Played: 19
- Top Scorer: Aaron Niland (4-72)

The 2023 All-Ireland Minor Hurling Championship was the 93rd staging of the All-Ireland Minor Hurling Championship since its establishment by the Gaelic Athletic Association in 1928. The championship ran from 21 March to 4 June 2023.

Tipperary entered the championship as the defending champions, however, they failed to qualify for the All-Ireland series after losing three games in the Munster Championship. Kerry and Galway moved province to join the Leinster Championship.

The All-Ireland final was played at FBD Semple Stadium in Thurles on 4 June 2023 between Clare and Galway, in what was their first meeting in a final in 26 years. Clare won the match by 2–22 to 4–11 to claim their second championship title overall and their first title since 1997.

Galway's Aaron Niland was the championship's top scorer with 4-72.

== Leinster Minor Hurling Championship ==
=== Tier 1 group 1 ===
==== Table ====
Pos	Team	Pld	W	D	L	SF	SA	Diff	Pts	Qualification
1	Wexford	3	3	0	0	68	29	+39	6	Advance to semi-finals
2	Dublin	3	2	0	1	70	42	+25	4	Advance to quarter-finals
3	Offaly	3	1	0	2	47	57	-10	2	Advance to preliminary quarter-final
4	Kerry	3	0	0	3	25	82	-57	0	

==== Tier 1 group 1 fixtures and results ====
25 March 2023 Round 1	Wexford	5-20 - 0-08	Kerry	MW Hire O'Moore Park
	K O’Connor (1-4), J Rossiter (0-6f), J Dunne (1-2), S Hyland (1-1); N Furlong (1-0); L Cooney (1-0), J O’Leary (0-3), J Doyle (0-2 ’65’), D Daly-O’Toole (0-1), T Dempsey (0-1).	Report	D Corridon 0-4 (4f), I Conway 0-2 (2f), R O’Halloran 0-1, M Lenihan 0-1.

25 March 2023 Round 1	Dublin	4-18 - 0-19	Offaly	Parnell Park
	D Purcell 2-9 (0-6f, 0-2 ’65’), C Newton 1-2, D Kilduff 1-1, M Ó Tighearnaigh 0-2, R Murphy, D O’Kelly, C Graham, R O’Neill 0-1 each.	Report	G Maher 0-12 (8f, 1 ’65), F Carney 0-2 (2f), A Cleary, N Flannery, N Kelly, J Morkan, C Bourke 0-1 each.

1 April 2023 Round 2	Offaly	1-15 - 0-06	Kerry	Glenisk O'Connor Park
	C Bourke (0-5), R Kearney (1-1), M Mulrooney (0-2), J O'Sullivan (0-2), L O'Riordan (0-2), D Hollywood (0-2); J Morkan (0-1f).	Report	D Corridon (0-3f), I Conway (0-2, 1f), C Carey-Sheedy (0-1).

1 April 2023 Round 2	Wexford	1-09 - 1-08	Dublin	Chadwicks Wexford Park
	J Doyle 1-4, J Rossiter 0-2, K O'Connor 0-1, L Cooney 0-1, J Nolan 0-1.		D Purcell 0-7, C Newton 1-0, F Lupton 0-1.

7 April 2023 Round 3	Dublin	2-23 - 0-11	Kerry	Laois Hire O'Moore Park
	C Graham 2-4, G Flannery 0-5 (4f), J Kennedy 0-4, D O’Kelly (2f), C Newton 0-3 each, Á Gargan, F Lupton, R Murphy, D Delaney 0-1 apiece.	Report	I Conway 0-6 (6f), D Corridon 0-3 (2f), K Best 0-1, E O'Flaherty 0-1.	Referee: B Kearney (Kildare)

7 April 2023 Round 3	Offaly	0-10 - 3-12	Wexford	St. Brendan's Park
	L O'Riordan (0-4, 0-3 frees), G Maher (0-4, 0-3 frees), C Bourke and J O'Sullivan (0-1 each).	Report	J Doyle (0-7, 0-5 frees, 0-1 '65'), L Cooney (1-2), J O'Leary (1-1), J Rossiter (1-0), T Dempsey (0-2).

=== Tier 1 group 2 ===
==== Table ====
Pos	Team	Pld	W	D	L	SF	SA	Diff	Pts	Qualification
1	Galway	3	3	0	0	90	37	+53	6	Advance to semi-finals
2	Kilkenny	3	2	0	1	66	52	+14	4	Advance to quarter-finals
3	Laois	3	1	0	2	49	88	-39	2	Advance to preliminary quarter-finals
4	Antrim	3	0	0	3	46	74	-28	0	

==== Tier 1 group 2 fixtures and results ====
25 March 2023 Round 1	Galway	2-18 - 1-10	Antrim	Darver COE
	A Niland (1-10, 1-7 frees), C Burke (1-1), E Mulleady (0-2); D Cunningham (0-2), M Burke (0-1), G Maher (0-1); C Gilligan (0-1).	Report	R McGarry (0-8, 5 frees), O O'Connor (1-0), R Fitzgerald (0-1), E McGurk (0-1).

25 March 2023 Round 1	Laois	1-12 - 3-17	Kilkenny	Laois Hire O'Moore Park
	E Murphy (1-7, six frees), J Duggan (0-4, four frees), M Downey (0-1).	Report	C Doyle (0-10, five frees and one '65'), E Lauhoff (1-1), M Stynes, B Moore (1-0 each), G Kelly (0-3), B McDermott, M Ahern, E Cahill (0-1 each).	Referee: .

1 April 2023 Round 2	Laois	0-11 - 4-28	Galway	Laois Hire O'Moore Park
	E Murphy 0-6 (five frees), C Byrne 0-3, E Quinn 0-1, E Bracken 0-1.	Report	A Niland 1-8 (1-3 frees, 0-1 65), B Callanan 1-5, V Morgan 1-1, C Burke 0-4 (two frees), S Keane 1-0, C Gilligan 0-3, J Rabbitte 0-2, M Burke 0-2, S Murphy 0-1, E Mulleady 0-1, D Cunningham 0-1.

1 April 2023 Round 2	Antrim	1-08 - 2-21	Kilkenny	National Sports Campus
	R McGarry 1-3 (2 frees), O O’Connor 0-3 (1 free), L Glackin 0-1, P Martin 0-1.	Report	G Kelly 1-4, B McDermott 1-2, C Doyle 0-5, M Stynes 0-4, B Moore 0-4, E Lauhoff 0-2.

7 April 2023 Round 3	Kilkenny	0-13 - 1-23	Galway	UPMC Nowlan Park
	C Doyle (0-9, 0-7 frees, 0-1 65); B McDermott, J O’Neill, M Stynes, B Moore (0-1 each).	Report	A Niland (1-13, 1-9 frees, 0-1 65); J Rabbitte, C Gilligan (0-3 each); M Burke (0-2); C Burke, L Kennedy (0-1 each).

7 April 2023 Round 3	Laois	4-14 - 1-19	Antrim	National Sports Campus
	J Duggan 3-5 (3f); E Murphy 0-5 (4f); B O’Mara 1-1; R Kavanagh 0-2; J Downey 0-1	Report	R McGarry 1-10 (9fs 1’65); R Fitzgerald 0-3; N Magee 0-2; O O’Connor 0-1; L McEnhill 0-1; E McGurk 0-1; L Glackin 0-1 (1f)	Referee: C Flynn (Westmeath)

=== Tier 2 group 1 ===
==== Table ====
Pos	Team	Pld	W	D	L	SF	SA	Diff	Pts	Qualification
1	Westmeath	2	2	0	0	48	24	+24	4	Advance to pre-preliminary quarter-finals
2	Meath	2	1	0	1	36	44	-8	2	Advance to pre-preliminary quarter-finals
3	Down	2	0	0	2	28	44	-16	0	

==== Tier 2 group 2 fixtures and results ====
18 March 2023 Round 1	Westmeath	3-16 - 3-06	Meath	TEG Cusack Park
	C Heffernan 1-10, B McNamee 1-1, C Ready 1-0, C Leech 0-2, W Larkin-McHugh and D Corrigan 0-1 each	Report	K Ennis 1-3, R Fay 1-1, E Kellegher 1-0 each, F Flynn and P Jordan 0-1 each

25 March 2023 Round 2	Meath	2-15 - 2-13	Down	St. Loman's Park
	K Ennis 1-11, M Fisher 1-2, C Murphy and P Jordan 0-1 each	Report	C Coleman 2-9, B Taggart 0-2, P Loughrey and S Pucci 0-1 each.

1 April 2023 Round 3	Down	0-09 - 3-14	Westmeath	Darver COE
	C Coleman 0-5, B Teggert 0-2, S Pucci 0-1, P Loughrey 0-1.		C Heffernan 1-6, C Ready 1-3, B McNamee 1-2, E Meehan 0-2, D Smith 0-1.

=== Tier 2 group 2 ===
==== Table ====
Pos	Team	Pld	W	D	L	SF	SA	Diff	Pts	Qualification
1	Kildare	2	2	0	0	82	17	65	4	Advance to pre-preliminary quarter-finals
2	Carlow	2	1	0	1	40	45	-5	2	Advance to pre-preliminary quarter-finals
3	Wicklow	2	0	0	2	18	78	-60	0	

==== Tier 2 group 2 fixtures and results ====
18 March 2023 Round 1	Wicklow	1-10 - 3-18	Carlow	Aughrim County Ground
	L Byrne 0-8, F Darcy 1-0, A Bartec 0-1, A Corcoran 0-1.	Report	J Nolan 1-5, R Murphy 0-7, J Dalton 0-4, K Nolan 1-0, TJ Darcy 1-0, J Foley 0-2.

27 March 2023 Round 2	Carlow	1-09 - 3-23	Kildare	Netwatch Cullen Park
	J Nolan 0-6 (6 frees), C Kavanagh 1-0; J Dalton 0-1, K Nolan 0-1, J Foley 0-1.	Report	T Ryan 2-2, C Carroll 0-7 (3 frees), T Power 1-3, A Bell 0-5 (1 free), O Hynes-Kelly 0-2; O Loughrane 0-2; O Byrne 0-1 (1 free); B Mulligan 0-1.

1 April 2023 Round 3	Kildare	9-23 - 0-05	Wicklow	Hawkfield COE
	C Carroll 1-8 (6 frees, 1 '65), M Owens 3-1, M Kiernan 3-0, T Power 1-5, T Ryan 1-2, N Farrell 0-4 (3 frees), S Henry 0-2, O Loughrane 0-1.	Report	L Byrne 0-5 (4 frees).

=== Leinster pre-preliminary quarter-finals ===
7 April 2023 Pre-preliminary quarter-final	Westmeath	3-10 - 0-07	Carlow	TEG Cusack Park
	C Heffernan 2-6 (0-4f, 0-1'65'), C Ready 1-1, J Mulvaney 0-2, S Hayes 0-1.	Report	J Nolan 0-4 (4f), J Dalton, A Jordan (f), C Kavanagh 0-1 each.

7 April 2023 Pre-preliminary quarter-final	Kildare	1-24 - 0-21	Meath	Hawkfield COE
	A Bell 0-10 (9 frees), T Ryan 0-6, O Hynes-Kelly 1-0, T Power 0-3, O Loughrane 0-2, C Carroll 0-1, O Byrne 0-1, M Owens 0-1.	Report	K Ennis 0-16 (13 frees,1'65), M Fisher 0-3, F Flynn 0-1, E Kellegher 0-1.

=== Leinster preliminary quarter-finals ===
16 April 2023 Preliminary quarter-final	Westmeath	0-06 - 0-17	Offaly	TEG Cusack Park
	J Mulvaney (0-2), C Heffernan (0-2, frees), D Smith, C Ready (0-1 each).	Report	L O'Riordan (0-6, 0-2 frees), C Bourke, M Mulrooney, D Scully (one free) (0-3 each), A Cleary (0-1), G Maher (0-1, free).

16 April 2023 Preliminary quarter-final	Kildare	2-13 - 4-15	Laois	Conneff Park
	T Ryan 1-3, T Power 1-2, A Bell 0-3 (0-3 Frees), M Owens 0-2, O Byrne 0-1, O Hynes-Kelly 0-1, D McGlynn 0-1.	Report	J Duggan 2-2, E Murphy 0-6 (0-3 frees), C O'Brien 1-1, B O'Mara 0-4, C Byrne 1-1, M Downey 0-1.

=== Leinster quarter-finals ===
23 April 2023 Quarter-final	Offaly	0-14 - 2-15	Kilkenny	Faithful Fields
	L O’Riordan 0-5 (0-4f), M Mulrooney 0-3, G Maher 0-2 (0-1 65, 0-1f), A Cleary 0-2, D Hollywood 0-1, F Carney 0-1.	Report	E McDermott 1-4, M Stynes 0-4 (0-1f, 0-2 65s), C Doyle 1-1 (0-1f), S Bergin 0-2, G Kelly 0-1, D Barcoe 0-1, B McDermott 0-1.	Referee: B Kearney (Kildare)

24 April 2023 Quarter-final	Laois	0-17 - 1-20	Dublin	Laois Hire O'Moore Park
	E Murphy (0-11, eight frees, two 65s), J Duggan (0-3, two frees), J Downey (0-1); C O’Brien (0-1), S Connolly (0-1).	Report	D Purcell (0-11, eight frees, two 65s), C Graham (1-4), M Ó Tighearnaigh (0-3); D O’Kelly (0-1); C Newton (0-1).	Referee: G McGrath (Wexford)

=== Leinster semi-finals ===
1 May 2023 Semi-final	Kilkenny	1-18 - 0-17	Wexford	UPMC Nowlan Park
	C Doyle 0-6 (4f, 1 '65); G Kelly 0-5; B Moore 1-0; E McDermott 0-3; M Stynes, S Bergin, J O'Neill, R Doherty 0-1 each.	Report	J Doyle 0-10 (8f, 1 '65); S Hyland 0-3; J Nolan, J Dunne, C Carley, J Rossiter 0-1 each.	Referee: M Ryan (Dublin)

1 May 2023 Semi-final	Dublin	0-13 - 3-22	Galway	Glenisk O'Connor Park
	D Purcell 0-7 (4f); G Flannery 0-3 (2f); W Wheatley, T Costello and C Graham 0-1 each.		A Niland 0-11 (8f); M Fallon 2-0; B Callanan 0-4; J Rabbitte (1-1); C Burke (1f) and E Mulleady 0-2 each; M Burke and D Counihan 0-1 each.	Referee: P Dunne (Laois)

=== Leinster final ===
12 May 2023 Final	Galway	2-20 - 0-14	Kilkenny	Laois Hire O'Moore Park
	A Niland (0-11, 6f and 1 '65), J Rabbitte (1-2), B Callanan (1-1), C Burke (0-2), M Burke, C Gilligan, E Mulleady, H Homes (0-1 each).	Report	C Doyle (0-5, 2f and 1 '65), G Kelly, S Bergin (0-2 each), M Ahern, E Lauhoff, B Moore, B McDermott, C Phelan (0-1 each).	Referee: A Kinahan (Offaly)

== Munster Minor Hurling Championship ==
=== Group Stage ===
==== Table ====
Pos	Team	Pld	W	D	L	SF	SA	Diff	Pts	Qualification
1	Cork	4	3	0	1	79	60	19	6	Advance to final
2	Clare	4	3	0	1	80	71	9	6	Advance to semi-finals
3	Limerick	4	3	0	1	79	72	7	6	Advance to semi-finals
4	Tipperary	4	1	0	3	48	55	-7	2	
5	Waterford	4	0	0	4	56	81	-25	0	

==== Group stage fixtures and results ====
21 March 2023 Round 1	Clare	2-15 - 0-14	Tipperary	Wolfe Tone Park
	M O’Brien 1-4 (4f); M Collins 1-2; M Power 0-4; F Hegarty 0-2 (1f); S Arthur, E Carey, E Price 0-1 each.	Report	R Ryan 0-6 (5f, 1’65); S Rowan 0-4; S Buckley 0-2 (1f); J Ormond, L Loughnane 0-1 each	Referee: D Deady (Limerick)

21 March 2023 Round 1	Waterford	0-07 - 1-07	Limerick	Fraher Field
	C Hartley 0-4 (4fs), A Regan 0-2, D Comerford 0-1 (1f).	Report	C Hayes 1-0, H Flanagan, R O'Farrell, D Ferland 0-2 each, J Cosgrove 0-1 (1f).	Referee: S Scanlon (Cork)

28 March 2023 Round 2	Limerick	2-20 - 0-22	Clare	TUS Gaelic Grounds
	D Collopy 0-10 (0-9 frees); H Flanagan 0-5; S Duff, R O’Farrell 1-0, P Kearney 0-2; J Cosgrave (free), T Boddy, D Ferland 0-1 each.		M O’Brien 0-8 (0-7 frees), S Arthur, F Hegarty (0-1 free), M Collins 0-3 each; J Mescall 0-2 each; O Fanning, M Power, J Hegarty (free) 0-1 each.	Referee: S Walsh (Waterford)

28 March 2023 Round 2	Cork	3-19 - 0-15	Waterford	Páirc Uí Chaoimh
	Barry Walsh 2-5 (1-0 penalty, 0-4f), B O’Flynn 1-7, Conor McCarthy (Glen Rovers) 0-2, J O’Leary, Z Biggane, F O’Brien, R Dooley, P Walsh 0-1 each.	Report	C Hartley 0-11 (0-8f, 0-1 65), S Mackey 0-2, C Deevy, C Tobin 0-1.	Referee: A Tierney (Tipperary)

4 April 2023 Round 3	Cork	2-13 - 1-08	Tipperary	Páirc Uí Chaoimh
	Barry Walsh (1-4, 1-0 pen, 0-2 frees); B O’Flynn (1-2); J Murphy, F O’Brien (0-2 each); Conor McCarthy (Glen Rovers), S Meade, J Casey (0-1 each).	Report	S Tobin (1-0); J Hayes (0-3); R Ryan (0-2 frees), S Rowan (0-2 each); L Loughnane (0-1 free).	Referee: S Walsh (Waterford)

14 April 2023 Round 3	Waterford	1-16 - 0-20	Clare	Fraher Field
	C Hartley 0-10 (7fs, 1 65), D Comerford 0-5 (5fs), C Tobin 1-0, S Mackey 0-1.	Report	M O'Brien 0-7 (6fs), J Hegarty (4fs), M Collins 0-4 each, O Fanning, S Arthur, J Mescall, M Power, H Doherty 0-1 each.	Referee: P Carroll (Tipperary)

18 April 2023 Round 4	Clare	0-17 - 0-12	Cork	O'Garney Park
	J Hegarty (0-4, 0-3 frees); M O’Brien (0-2f); M Collins (0-3 each); E Oige Fanning, S Arthur (0-2 each); R Keane, J Mescall, E Begley (0-1 each).	Report	J Murphy (0-5, 0-5 frees); B Walsh, C McCarthy (0-2 each); F O’Brien, S Meade, J O’Brien (0-1 each).	Referee: A Tierney (Tipperary)

18 April 2023 Round 4	Tipperary	1-22 - 1-23	Limerick	FBD Semple Stadium
	R Ryan (0-16, 9 frees, 1 65); S Rowan (1-0); J Ormond (0-2); C Kennedy, S Tobin, C Cahill, C Minogue (0-1 each).	Report	D Collopy (0-9, 6 frees); R O’Farrell (1-3); J Cosgrave (0-3, 1 free); M Fitzgerald, T Boddy, P Kearney (0-2 each); D Ferland, H Flanagan (0-1 each).	Referee: C O'Regan (Cork)

25 April 2023 Round 5	Limerick	1-14 - 0-20	Cork	TUS Gaelic Grounds
	D Collopy (0-6, 0-5 frees), D Ferland (1-1), R O’Farrell and T Boddy (0-3 each), P Kearney (0-1).	Report	Barry Walsh (0-9, 0-8 frees), F O’Brien, B Lynch and Z Biggane (0-2 each), J O’Leary, C McCarthy, B O’Flynn, R Dooley and J Casey (0-1 each).	Referee: J Mullins (Clare)

25 April 2023 Round 5	Tipperary	1-20 - 1-12	Waterford	FBD Semple Stadium
	R Ryan (0-6,3fs), S Tobin (1-2), S Rowan, S Buckley (0-3 each), J Hayes (0-2), J Ormond, L Loughnane, J Lahart, D Costigan (0-1 each);	Report	C Hartley (0-8, 5fs), C Tobin (1-1), S Mackey(0-2), C Carroll(0-1).	Referee: S Scanlon

=== Munster semi-final ===
2 May 2023 Semi-final	Clare	2-21 - 2-15	Limerick	Cusack Park
	M O’Brien (2-3, 0-1 free); M Collins (0-6); F Hegarty (0-3); J Hegarty (0-2 free), M Power (0-2 each); R Kilroy, J Mescall, S Arthur, E Mulcahy, E Begley (0-1 each).	Report	D Collopy (0-4, 0-2 frees); P Kearney (1-1); D Gleeson (0-3, 0-2 frees, 1’65), D Ferland (1-0); T Boddy, H Flanagan, R O’Farrell (0-2 each); S Duff (0-1).	Referee: N Barry (Waterford)

=== Munster final ===
9 May 2023 Final	Cork	0-15 - 1-19	Clare	FBD Semple Stadium
	Barry Walsh (0-9, 0-5 frees); B O’Flynn, J Casey (0-2 each); J O’Leary, Z Biggane (0-1 each).	Report	M O’Brien (0-8, 0-7 frees); E Begley (1-1); J Hegarty (0-2 frees), M O’Halloran (0-2 each); E Gunning, J Mescal, S Arthur, M Collins, Ó Fanning, F Hegarty (0-1 each).	Referee: A Tierney (Tipperary)

== All-Ireland Minor Hurling Championship ==
=== All-Ireland semi-finals ===
20 May 2023 Semi-final	Clare	0-23 - 0-15	Kilkenny	FBD Semple Stadium
	J Hegarty (0-6, 4 frees, 1 65); M O’Brien (0-4, 3 frees); J Mescal, R Kilroy, S Arthur (0-2 each); E Gunning, J Moylan, E Price, M Collins, Ó Fanning, H Doherty, E Mulcahy (0-1 each).		G Kelly (3 frees), C Doyle (4 frees) (0-5 each); C Brennan (0-2); D Vereker, B McDermott, B Moore (0-1 each).	Referee: K Jordan (Tipperary)

20 May 2023 Semi-final	Galway	3-18 - 1-10	Cork	FBD Semple Stadium
	A Niland 1-11 (0-10f); J Rabbitte, H Holmes 1-1 each; C Gilligan 0-2; C Killeen, C Burke, M Fallon 0-1 each.	Report	B O’Flynn 1-2; Barry Walsh 0-5 (3f); Ben Walsh, J Casey, F O’Brien 0-1 each.	Referee: T Gleeson (Dublin)

=== All-Ireland final ===
4 June 2023 Final	Clare	2-22 - 4-11	Galway	FBD Semple Stadium
	M O'Brien (0-7, 0-5 frees), J Hegarty (1-2 frees), Ó Fanning (1-1), M Collins (0-3), S Arthur (0-2), E Price, J Mescal, M Power, H Doherty, F Hegarty, E Carey and E Begley (0-1 each)	Report	A Niland (0-8, 0-6 frees), C Killeen (2-0), J Rabbitte (1-1), H Holmes (1-0), M Burke and M Fallon (0-1 each)	Referee: M Kennedy (Tipperary)

== Statistics ==
=== Top scorers ===
Overall

Rank	Player	Club	Tally	Total	Matches	Average
1	Aaron Niland	Galway	4-72	84	7	12.00
2	Marc O'Brien	Clare	3-44	53	8	6.62
3	Conor Doyle	Kilkenny	1-41	44	7	6.28
4	Barry Walsh	Cork	3-32	41	5	8.20
5	David Purcell	Dublin	2-34	40	4	11.00
6	Eoghan Murphy	Laois	1-35	38	5	7.60
7	Conor Heffernan	Westmeath	4-24	36	4	9.00
7	Kyle Ennis	Meath	2-30	36	3	12.00
9	Colm Hartley	Waterford	0-33	33	4	8.25
10	Robbie Ryan	Tipperary	0-30	30	4	7.50

In a single game

Rank	Player	Club	Tally	Total	Opposition
1	Aaron Niland	Galway	1-13	16	Kilkenny
1	Kyle Ennis	Meath	0-16	16	Kildare
1	Robbie Ryan	Tipperary	0-16	16	Limerick
4	David Purcell	Dublin	2-09	15	Offaly
4	Cathal Coleman	Down	2-09	15	Meath
6	Justin Duggan	Laois	3-05	14	Antrim
6	Kyle Ennis	Meath	1-11	14	Meath
6	Aaron Niland	Galway	1-11	14	Cork
9	Aaron Niland	Galway	1-10	13	Antrim
9	Roan McGarry	Antrim	1-10	13	Laois
