= Cian O'Connor (hurler) =

Irish hurler

Personal information
- Native name: Cian Ó Conchubhair (Irish)
- Born: 29 December 1983 (age 42) Glounthaune, County Cork, Ireland
- Occupation: Sales rep
- Height: 6 ft 0 in (183 cm)

Sport
- Sport: Hurling
- Position: Left corner-back
Club
- Years: Club
- 2001-present: Erin's Own
Club titles
- Cork titles: 2
Inter-county
Years	County	Apps (scores)
2003-2007	Cork	12 (0-00)
Inter-county titles
- Munster titles: 2
- All-Irelands: 2
- NHL: 0
- All Stars: 0

Cian O'Connor (born 29 December 1983) is an Irish hurler. At club level, he plays with Erin's Own and at inter-county level is a former member of the Cork senior hurling team.

== Career ==
O'Connor attended St Finbarr's College and lined out in the various hurling and Gaelic football competitions. He won a Dr O'Callaghan Cup medal in 2000, after lining out in the 0–13 to 0–07 defeat of St Colman's College in the final. O'Connor also won a Simcox Cup medal that year, after the Farranferris Gaelic footballers completed the double after a defeat of Coláiste Chríost Rí.

At club level, O'Connor first played for Erin's Own at juvenile and underage levels. He was part of the club's minor team that won consecutive Cork Premier MHC titles in 2000 and 2001, following respective victories over Glen Rovers and Na Piarsaigh. He later won Cork U21AHC titles in 2002 and 2004.

O'Connor made his senior team debut in 2001. He claimed his first Cork SHC when, in 2006, he lined out in the 2–19 to 3–14 win over Cloyne in the final. He won a second consecutive title the following year after a 1–11 to 1–07 defeat of Newtownshandrum.

At the inter-county level, O'Connor first appeared for Cork as a member of the minor team in 2001. He ended the season by winning an All-Ireland MHC medal after a 2–10 to 1–08 defeat of Galway in the final. His tenure with the under-21 team ended without silverware.

O'Connor was drafted onto the senior team in January 2003. He was a non-playing substitute when Cork beat Kilkenny by 0–17 to 0–09 in the 2004 All-Ireland final. O'Connor was again a non-playing substitute when Cork won the Munster SHC title the following year, before beating Galway by 1–21 to 1–16 in the 2005 All-Ireland final. He won a second consecutive Munster SHC medal in 2006, after starting the game at wing-forward. O'Connor was introduced as a substitute for Kieran Murphy when Cork had a three-point defeat by Kilkenny in the 2006 All-Ireland final. He mad ehis last appearance for Cork in 2007.

== Honours ==
St Finbarr's College

- Simcox Cup: 2000
- Dr O'Callaghan Cup: 2000

Erin's Own

- Cork Senior Hurling Championship: 2006, 2007
- Cork Junior A Football Championship: 2005
- East Cork Junior A Football Championship: 2002, 2003, 2005, 2017
- Cork Premier Under-21 A Hurling Championship: 2002, 2004
- Cork Premier Minor Hurling Championship: 2000, 2001

Cork

- All-Ireland Senior Hurling Championship: 2004, 2005
- Munster Senior Hurling Championship: 2005, 2006
- All-Ireland Minor Hurling Championship: 2001
