= 2002–03 Harty Cup =

Hurling tournament

2002–03 Dr Harty Cup
- Dates: 25 September 2002 – 30 March 2003
- Teams: 17
- Sponsor: Irish Examiner
- Champions: St Colman's College (9th title); Andrew O'Shaughnessy (captain); Denis Ring (manager)
- Runners-up: St Flannan's College; Niall Dunne (captain); Peter Quinn (manager)

Tournament statistics
- Matches played: 36
- Goals scored: 140 (3.89 per match)
- Points scored: 754 (20.94 per match)
- Top scorer(s): Andrew O'Shaughnessy (12-15)

The 2002–03 Harty Cup was the 83rd staging of the Harty Cup since its establishment in hurling by the Munster Council of Gaelic Athletic Association in 1918. The competition ran from 25 September 2002 to 30 March 2003. A new format was used with the introduction of a group stage.

St Colman's College successfully defended its title at the Harty Cup final replay on 30 March 2003 at Páirc Caoimhín Ó Luing in Feenagh, 2–13 to 0–08, against St Flannan's College, in what was their seventh meeting in the final and a first meeting in two years. St Colman's College won their ninth successive Harty Cup title overall and a third consecutive title.

St Colman's College's Andrew O'Shaughnessy was the top scorer with 12–15.

== Group A ==
=== Group A table ===
Knockout stage

Team	Matches				Score			Pts
Team	Pld	W	D	L	For	Against	Diff	Pts
St Colman's College	4	4	0	0	109	31	78	8
De La Salle College	4	3	0	1	73	53	20	6
Youghal CBS	4	2	0	2	52	82	-30	4
Coláistí na nDéise	4	2	0	2	60	70	-10	4
St Finbarr's College	4	0	0	4	34	102	-68	0

=== Group A results ===
25 September 2002 Round 1	St Finbarr's College	1-08 - 2-09	Youghal CBS	Páirc Seán de Barra
	G O'Donovan 1-1, P Twomey 0-2, N Foley 0-2, L Ó Riain 0-2, J Kearney 0-1.		B Ring 1-3, B Barry 1-3, C Fogarty 0-1, B McCarthy 0-1, E O'Loughlin 0-1.

9 October 2002 Round 1	St Colman's College	5-10 - 1-06	De La Salle College Waterford	Ardfinnan GAA Grounds
	A O'Shaughnessy 5-2, P Kirby 0-5, K O'Mahony 0-1, M Allen 0-1, M Cleary 0-1.		T Power 0-5, P Nevin 1-1.

14 October 2002 Round 2	St Finbarr's College	1-05 - 5-15	De La Salle College Waterford	Castle Grounds
	G O'Donovan 1-1, N Foley 0-2, A Hegarty 0-1, S O'Reilly 0-1.		G O'Connor 2-3, T Power 2-1, K Moran 1-2, J Quirke 0-4, S O'Sullivan 0-3, M Barden 0-1, P Nevin 0-1.

15 October 2002 Round 2	St Colman's College	3-11 - 0-06	Coláistí na nDéise	Ballyduff Upper GAA Grounds
	P Kirby 2-2, P Kearney 0-5, M Cleary 1-0, A O'Shaughnessy 0-2, M Allen 0-1, C Griffen 0-1.		M Whelan 0-4, M O'Brien 0-1, A Cooney 0-1.

7 November 2002 Round 3	St Colman's College	3-17 - 2-02	St Finbarr's College	Páirc Mac Gearailt
	M Allen 1-5, P Kearney 1-4, C Coakley 1-1, P Cotter 0-2, P Hyland 0-2, P Hogan 0-2, A Kearney 0-1.		D O'Callaghan 1-0, I Looney 1-0, G Looney 0-1, P Twomey 0-1.

13 November 2002 Round 3	Youghal CBS	3-09 - 1-11	Coláistí na nDéise	Ballyduff Upper GAA Grounds
	B Barry 2-6, N Beresford 1-0, B Ring 0-3.		M Gorman 1-6, L Linnane 0-1, B Hickey 0-1, P Walsh 0-1, A Cooney 0-1, D Hickey 0-1.

27 November 2002 Round 4	De La Salle College Waterford	3-10 - 1-08	Youghal CBS	Kill GAA Grounds
	T Power 1-3, J Quirke 0-4, G O'Connell 1-0, M Barden 1-0, P Nevin 0-1, K Moran 0-1, S O'Sullivan 0-1.		B Barry 1-7, B Ring 0-1.

27 November 2002 Round 4	Coláistí na nDéise	5-16 - 2-01	St Finbarr's College	Abbeyside Grounds
	M O'Gorman 3-5, M Whelan 1-4, S Kelly 1-2, C Mears 0-4, N Murphy 0-1.		P Twomey 1-0, D O'Callaghan 1-0, J Kearney 0-1.

11 December 2002 Round 5	De La Salle College Waterford	0-15 - 1-06	Coláistí na nDéise	Fraher Field
	T Power 0-4, J Quirke 0-3, M Barden 0-2, P Nevin 0-2, S O'Sullivan 0-2, K Moran 0-1, G O'Connor 0-1.		N Ó Murchú 1-0, D Hickey 0-2, S Kavanagh 0-1, A Cooney 0-1, M O'Gorman 0-1, C Mears 0-1.

13 December 2002 Round 5	St Colman's College	8-14 - 0-08	Youghal CBS	The Mon Field
	A O'Shaughnessy 4-3, F Browne 2-1, M Cleary 1-1, M Allen 0-4, P Cotter 1-0, P Kearney 0-2, C Coakley 0-1, P Hyland 0-1, E Condon 0-1.		B Barry 0-4, C Fogarty 0-3, B Ring 0-1.

== Group B ==
=== Group B table ===
Knockout stage

Team	Matches				Score			Pts
Team	Pld	W	D	L	For	Against	Diff	Pts
Doon CBS	3	3	0	0	59	33	26	6
Our Lady's SS	3	2	0	1	49	50	-1	4
Midleton CBS	3	1	0	2	43	46	-3	2
Coláiste an Phiarsaigh	3	0	0	3	44	66	-22	0

=== Group B results ===
9 October 2002 Round 1	Our Lady's Secondary School	1-10 - 1-08	Midleton CBS	Clonmel GAA Ground
	E Sweeney 1-6, J Ryan 0-2, K McGrath 0-1, C Costigan 0-1.		G O'Leary 0-5, I Fitzpatrick 1-1, S Hennessy 0-1, S Crowley 0-1.

25 September 2002 Round 1	Coláiste an Phiarsaigh	2-05 - 2-14	Doon CBS	Mitchelstown Grounds
	T Óg Murphy 1-2, S O'Callaghan 1-0, K O'Brien 0-2, E Coughlan 0-1.		R Ryan 1-3, B Fenton 1-2, P Ryan 0-5, P McNamara 0-3, J Bradshaw 0-1.

15 October 2002 Round 2	Doon CBS	2-12 - 1-07	Midleton CBS	Mitchelstown Grounds
	B Fenton 1-3, R Ryan 1-1, P Ryan 0-4, J Bradshaw 0-2, C Ryan 0-1, M Fitzgerald 0-1.		G O'Leary 0-4, K Hegarty 1-0, B Hartnett 0-2, R Power 0-1.

15 October 2002 Round 2	Our Lady's Secondary School	2-18 - 2-12	Coláiste an Phiarsaigh	Clonmel GAA Ground
	E Sweeney 1-8, J Egan 1-1, J Ryan 0-3, C Campion 0-2, K McGrath 0-2, L Egan 0-1, B Maher 0-1.		S Kelly 1-4, S O'Callaghan 1-3, R O'Brien 0-2, T Murphy 0-1, A Condon 0-1, S Heatherman 0-1.

13 November 2002 Round 3	Midleton CBS	4-10 - 3-06	Coláiste an Phiarsaigh	Paddy Walsh Memorial Park
	S Hennessy 2-4, M Foley 1-0, I Fitzpatrick 1-0, B Hartnett 0-2, K Hurley 0-2, K Hegarty 0-1, S Crowley 0-1.		T Óg O Murchú 1-3, R Ó Briain 1-0, S Ó Ceallaigh 1-0, S Ó Ceallacháin 0-3.

13 November 2002 Round 3	Doon CBS	3-12 - 2-06	Our Lady's Secondary School	Boherlahan Grounds
	R Ryan 1-3, P Ryan 0-5, P McNamara 1-1, M Fitzgerald 1-1, B Fenton 0-1, J Bradshaw 0-1.		E Sweeney 0-6, R Stapleton 1-0, E Franks 1-0.

== Group C ==
=== Group C table ===
Knockout stage

Team	Matches				Score			Pts
Team	Pld	W	D	L	For	Against	Diff	Pts
Abbey CBS	3	3	0	0	58	43	15	6
Cashel Community School	3	2	0	1	60	38	22	4
Scarriff CS	3	1	0	2	48	58	-10	2
North Monastery	3	0	0	3	41	62	-21	0

=== Group C results ===
25 September 2002 Round 1	Cashel Community School	1-13 - 2-12	Abbey CBS	Golden Grounds
	J Gleeson 0-5, T Hayes 1-2, J McCarthy 0-3, D Hickey 0-1, M Harrington 0-1, S Hickey 0-1.		D Morrissey 2-4, C O'Brien 0-5, J Ryan 0-2, L O'Dwyer 0-1.

25 September 2002 Round 1	Scarriff Community School	4-15 - 2-09	North Monastery	FitzGerald Park
	R Horan 3-2, B Bugler 0-5, M Malone 1-0, M Flaherty 0-3, E Collins 0-2, P Minogue 0-1, J Minogue 0-1, H Vaughan 0-1.		A Ó hAilpín 1-6, B Hackett 1-2, A Brady 0-1.

15 October 2002 Round 2	Scarriff Community School	0-06 - 1-17	Cashel Community School	MacDonagh Park
	B Bugler 0-2, M Malone 0-1, M Flaherty 0-1, H Vaughan 0-1, T Collins 0-1.

15 October 2002 Round 2	Abbey CBS	1-14 - 3-03	North Monastery	Páirc Mac Gearailt
	C O'Brien 0-8, D Morrissey 0-4, C O'Dwyer 1-0, J Ryan 0-1, T O'Brien 0-1.		T Kelly 1-0, C McCarthy 1-0, A King 1-0, B Hackett 0-2, A Ó hAilpín 0-1.

13 November 2002 Round 3	Cashel Community School	2-18 - 1-11	North Monastery	Mitchelstown GAA Grounds
	J Gleeson 1-4, D Hickey 1-3, P O'Dwyer 0-4, M Harding 0-3, J McCarthy 0-1, S Hickey 0-1, J Maher 0-1, T Hayes 0-1.		C Barry 1-8, C McCarthy 0-1, A Ó hAilpín 0-1.

13 November 2002 Round 3	Abbey CBS	4-11 - 2-09	Scarriff Community School	Childers Road
	D Morrissey 3-2, C O'Brien 1-6, W Rodgers 0-1, B Grogan 0-1, J Ryan 00-1.		B Bugler 1-2, G Treacy 1-1, E Collins 0-2, M Flaherty 0-2, B Noonan 0-1, C Molloy 0-1.

== Group D ==
=== Group D table ===
Knockout stage

Team	Matches				Score			Pts
Team	Pld	W	D	L	For	Against	Diff	Pts
St Flannan's College	3	3	0	0	87	26	61	6
Thurles CBS	3	2	0	1	82	35	47	4
Coláiste Chríost Rí	3	1	0	2	35	66	-31	2
Limerick CBS	3	0	0	3	17	97	-80	0

=== Group D results ===
25 September 2002 Round 1	St Flannan's College	6-21 - 0-06	Limerick CBS	Fr Murphy Memorial Park
	B Gaffney 3-1, D O'Halloran 2-4, N Dunne 0-7, J Brennan 1-3, J Clancy 0-3, K Forde 0-1, A O'Flaherty 0-1, A Page 0-1.		F Byrne 0-3, G O'Connor 0-3.

25 September 2002 Round 1	Coláiste Chríost Rí	0-10 - 4-17	Thurles CBS	Ballygiblin Grounds
	S Ó Duinnín 0-4, C Ó Murchú 0-3, E Ó Súilleabháin 0-1, S Mac Nuat 0-1, G de Brun 0-1.		R Ruth 2-7, S Lillis 1-3, D Sheppard 1-1, C Barrett 0-2, E Ryan 0-1, J Ryan 0-1, M Butler 0-1, C Ryan 0-1.

15 October 2002 Round 2	Thurles CBS	5-23 - 1-03	Limerick CBS	Seán Treacy Park
	D Sheppard 3-3, R Ruth 0-9, R O'Gorman 1-2, P Kenny 1-0, P McCormack 0-3, S Lillis 0-3, J Ryan 0-2, M Butler 0-1.		F Tynan 1-0, F Byrnes 0-2, D Grimes 0-1.

15 October 2002 Round 2	St Flannan's College	4-20 - 0-05	Coláiste Chríost Rí	Páirc Caoimhín Ó Luing
	J Clancy 1-4, A Griffey 1-3, M Murphy 1-3, E Shinnors 0-3, N Dunne 0-3, A Page 0-1, A Flaherty 0-1, K Forde 0-1, B Gaffney 0-1.		S Dineen 0-4, R Lee 0-1.

13 November 2002 Round 3	St Flannan's College	1-13 - 1-12	Thurles CBS	MacDonagh Park
	N Dunne 1-5, A Page 0-4, J McInerney 0-1, E Shinnors 0-1, J Clancy 0-1, D O'Halloran 0-1.		R Ruth 1-5, P McCormack 0-4, J Dixon 0-1, C Barrett 0-1, D Sheppard 0-1.

14 November 2002 Round 3	Coláiste Chríost Rí	2-14 - 1-02	Limerick CBS	Ballyagran Grounds
	S Nott 1-4, D Coughlan 0-4, E Heffernan 1-0, P O'Shea 0-3, T Morgan 0-2, C O'Brien 0-1.		A O'Dea 1-0, G Leonard 0-1, G O'Connor 0-1.

== Knockout stage ==
=== Quarter-finals ===
29 January 2003 Quarter-final	St Colman's College	4-14 - 0-13	Thurles CBS	Ardfinnan GAA Grounds
	F Browne 3-0, A O'Shaughnessy 1-3, P Kirby 0-5, P Kearney 0-4, M Allen 0-2.		R Ruth 0-7, P McCormack 0-2, R O'Gorman 0-1, E Ryan 0-1, C Barrett 0-1, J Ryan 0-1.

29 January 2002 Quarter-final	De La Salle College Waterford	2-08 - 2-07	Abbey CBS	Clonmel GAA Ground
	G O'Connor 1-2, G Molloy 1-0, J Quirke 0-3, S O'Sullivan 0-2, T Power 0-1.		C O'Brien 1-4, B Ryan 1-0, D Morrissey 0-2, B Hanley 0-1.

29 January 2003 Quarter-final	Doon CBS	1-15 - 1-10	Cashel Community School	Seán Treacy Park
	P McNamara 1-2, P Ryan 0-5, R Ryan 0-3, D Fenton 0-2, E Kiely 0-1, M Fitzgerald 0-1, C Ryan 0-1.		P O'Dwyer 1-3, J Gleeson 0-3, M Harding 0-2, D Hickey 0-2.

29 January 2003 Quarter-final	St Flannan's College	1-16 - 0-08	Our Lady's Secondary School	MacDonagh Park
	N Dunne 1-6, E Shinnors 0-6, A Flaherty 0-2, J McInerney 0-1, K Forde 0-1.		E McSweeney 0-6, K McGrath 0-1, E Franks 0-1.

=== Semi-finals ===
16 February 2003 Semi-final	St Flannan's College	1-14 - 1-06	Doon CBS	Silvermines GAA Grounds
	E Shinnors 0-7, B Gaffney 1-0, R Keane 0-2, A Flaherty 0-1, D O'Halloran 0-1, J McInerney 0-1, A Griffey 0-1, N Dunne 0-1.		M Fitzgerald 0-5, P McNamara 1-0, P Ryan 0-1.

1 March 2003 Semi-final	St Colman's College	2-10 - 1-09	De La Salle College Waterford	Clonmel GAA Ground
	P Kirby 0-7, A O'Shaughnessy 1-1, M Allen 1-1, P Kearney 0-1.		J Quirke 0-6, G O'Connor 1-1, K Moran 0-1, M Barden 0-1.

=== Final ===
16 March 2003 Final	St Colman's College	1-06 - 1-06	St Flannan's College	Páirc Caoimhín Ó Luing
	F Browne 1-0, P Kirby 0-3, P Kearney 0-2, E Condon 0-1.		E Shinnors 0-4, B Gaffney 1-0, D O'Halloran 0-2.

30 March 2003 Final	St Colman's College	2-13 - 0-08	St Flannan's College	Páirc Caoimhín Ó Luing
	A O'Shaughnessy 1-4 (0-1 free); C Coakley 1-1; P Kirby 0-5 (0- 3 frees, 0-1 65); E Condon, P Kearney, F Browne 0-1 each.	Report	E Shinnors 0-4 (frees); A Griffey 0-2; J Clancy, D O'Halloran 0-1 each.	Referee: W Barrett (Tipperary)

== Statistics ==
=== Top scorers ===
Rank	Player	County	Tally	Total	Matches	Average
1	Andrew O'Shaughnessy	St Colman's College	12-15	51	6	8.50
2	Richie Ruth	Thurles CBS	3-28	37	4	9.25
3	Patrick Kirby	St Colman's College	2-27	33	8	4.16
4	Brendan Barry	Youghal CBS	4-20	32	4	8.00
4	Evan Sweeney	Our Lady's SS	2-26	32	4	8.00
6	Conor O'Brien	The Abbey CBS	2-23	29	4	7.25
7	Niall Dunne	St Flannan's College	2-22	28	8	3.50
8	David Morrissey	The Abbey CBS	5-12	27	4	6.75
9	Eoin Shinnors	St Flannan's College	0-25	25	7	3.57
10	Mark Gorman	Coláistí na nDéise	4-12	24	4	6.00
