= 2001–02 Harty Cup =

Hurling tournament

2001–02 Dr Harty Cup
- Dates: 10 October 2001 – 24 March 2002
- Teams: 16
- Sponsor: Irish Examiner
- Champions: St Colman's College (8th title); Maurice O'Brien (captain); Denis Ring (manager)
- Runners-up: Our Lady's Secondary School; Derek Bourke (captain); John Costigan (manager)

Tournament statistics
- Matches played: 15
- Goals scored: 63 (4.2 per match)
- Points scored: 290 (19.33 per match)
- Top scorer(s): Andrew O'Shaughnessy (7-13)

The 2001–02 Harty Cup was the 82nd staging of the Harty Cup since its establishment in hurling by the Munster Council of Gaelic Athletic Association in 1918. The draw for the opening round fixtures took place on 20 June 2001. The competition ran from 10 October 2001 to 24 March 2002. It was the last Harty Cup to be contested using a straight knock-out format.

St Colman's College successfully defended its title in the Harty Cup final on 24 March 2002 at Clonmel GAA Ground, 2–18 to 0–06, against Our Lady's Secondary School, in what was their first ever meeting in a final, an eighth successive Harty Cup title overall and a second consecutive title.

St Colman's College's Andrew O'Shaughnessy was the top scorer with 7–13.

== Results ==
=== First round ===
10 October 2001 First round	De La Salle College Waterford	2-05 - 2-11	Thurles CBS	Clonmel GAA Ground
	P Nevin 1-1, A Ryan 1-0, T Power 0-2, G O'Connor 0-1, M Barden 0-1.		R Quigley 2-3, R Ruth 0-3, S Ryan 0-3, C Sweeney 0-1, S Stakelum 0-1.

10 October 2001 First round	Scarriff Community School	1-10 - 5-13	Cashel Community School	MacDonagh Park
	N Sheehy 0-5, G McCarthy 1-0, B Bolger 0-2, M Scanlon 0-1, C McCarthy 0-1.		P Breen 3-5, E O'Brien 1-0, P O'Dwyer 1-0, P O'Flaherty 0-3, P Whelan 0-2, M Coleman 0-1, P Hally 0-1, M Harding 0-1.

10 October 2001 First round	St Aidan's Community College	0-09 - 1-12	Coláiste an Phiarsaigh	Felix Sarsfield Memorial Park
	D Dorris 0-6, D Óg O'Donovan 0-1, E Geaney 0-1, G Moylan 0-1.		R Ó Briain 1-5, Aibhistín Finn 0-4, M Ó Floinn 0-1, Aindriú Finn 0-1, B Ó Conaill 0-1.

10 October 2001 First round	Limerick CBS	0-04 - 5-21	St Colman's College	Kilfinane Road
	W O'Dea 0-1, S Frawley 0-1, S Cahill 0-1, J Corbett 0-1.		P Kearney 1-6, P Kirby 2-0, D Holohan 1-2, D Carroll 1-0, S Stack 0-3, M O'Brien 0-2, E Condon 0-2, B Healy 0-2, JG Kelly 0-1, R Relihan 0-1, A O'Shaughnessy 0-1, A Kearney 0-1.

10 October 2001 First round	Our Lady's Secondary School	4-15 - 1-04	Shannon Schools	Lacken Park
	P Shortt 3-8, E Kelly 1-3, E Sweeney 0-3, T Hassett 0-1.		D Guinane 1-0, C McPhillips 0-1, M O'Hanlon 0-1,

10 October 2001 First round	Coláistí na nDéise	4-14 - 4-02	North Monastery	Páirc Mac Gearailt
	J Hurney 2-2, M Whelan 1-4, B Walsh 1-2, N O'Brien 0-2, C Morrissey 0-2, D Fives 0-1, E Walsh 0-1.		M Lee 2-0, S Ó Súilleabháin 1-0, E Ó Súilleabháin 1-0, S Miller 0-1, G Brown 0-1.

10 October 2001 First round	St Finbarr's College	2-04 - 6-19	St Flannan's College	Páirc Caoimhín Ó Luing
	K Foley 1-2, G Looney 1-1, D Kent 0-1.		M Culbert 2-2, E Whelan 1-3, J Heneghan 1-2, K Neylon 0-5, C Lafferty 1-0, I Kilbane 1-0, J McCarthy 0-2, S McGrath 0-2, G Griffin 0-2, T Kierse 0-1.

10 October 2001 First round	Midleton CBS	2-15 - 2-08	Coláiste Chríost Rí	Páirc Séamus de barra
	B Morrissey 1-3, B Smiddy 0-6, C Ring 1-0, M Foley 0-2, D O'Sullivan 0-2, D Cronin 0-1, K Hartnett 0-1.		C Murphy 0-5, C O'Reilly 1-0, A Murphy 1-0, S Dineen 0-2, B Cashman 0-1.

=== Quarter-finals ===
14 November 2001 Quarter-final	Our Lady's Secondary School	1-10 - 0-10	St Flannan's College	MacDonagh Park
	E Kelly 0-8, P Shortt 1-0, E Sweeney 0-1, J Hassett 0-1.		S McGrath 0-3, K Neylon 0-3, G Griffin 0-2, S O'Leary 0-1, J Hanrahan 0-1.

14 November 2001 Quarter-final	Midleton CBS	0-10 - 1-06	Thurles CBS	Páirc Mac Gearailt
	B Smiddy 0-6, B Hennessy 0-1, R Power 0-1, C Ring 0-1, M Foley 0-1.		R Quigley 1-1, R Ruth 0-4, S McKenna 0-1.

14 November 2001 Quarter-final	Coláistí na nDéise	1-04 - 7-11	Cashel Community School	Clonmel GAA Ground
	M Whelan 1-0, E Walsh 0-2, C Morrissey 0-1, J Hurney 0-1.		P O'Dwyer 4-2, M Heelan 2-0, E Hallinan 1-3, P O'Flaherty 0-2, P Breen 0-2, P Hally 0-1, P Hickey 0-1.

14 November 2001 Quarter-final	Coláiste an Phiarsaigh	1-06 - 2-12	St Colman's College	Felix Sarsfield Memorial Park
	R Ó Briain 1-4, E Ó Floinn 0-1, S Ó Buachalla 0-1.		A O'Shaughnessy 2-2, P Kearney 0-7, E Condon 0-2, M Allen 0-1.

=== Semi-finals ===
23 February 2002 Semi-final	Our Lady's Secondary School	2-17 - 1-05	Midleton CBS	Clonmel GAA Ground
	E Kelly 1-8, E Sweeney 1-3, P Shortt 0-2, B Healy 0-2, J Hassett 0-1, P Brennan 0-1.		K Hartnett 1-2, D O'Sullivan 0-1, L Healy 0-1, G O'Leary 0-1.

24 February 2002 Semi-final	St Colman's College	4-06 - 0-03	Cashel Community School	Mitchelstown Grounds
	A O'Shaughnessy 4-3, P Kirby 0-2, L Philpott 0-1.		P O'Flaherty 0-2, E Hallinan 0-1.

=== Final ===
24 March 2002 Final	St Colman's College	2-18 - 0-06	Our Lady's Secondary School	Clonmel GAA Ground
	A O'Shaughnessy 1-7, J O'Donnell 1-1, P Kirby 0-4, P Kearney 0-3, S Molumphy 0-1, L Philpott 0-1, M O'Brien 0-1.		E Kelly 0-3, P Shortt 0-2, C Campion 0-1.	Referee: D Richardson (Limerick)

== Statistics ==
=== Top scorers ===
Rank	Player	County	Tally	Total	Matches	Average
1	Andrew O'Shaughnessy	St Colman's College	7-13	34	4	8.50
2	Eddie Kelly	Our Lady's SS	2-22	28	4	7.00
3	Pat Shortt	Our Lady's SS	4-12	24	4	6.00
4	Paul Kearney	St Colman's College	1-16	19	4	4.75
5	Paul O'Dwyer	Cashel Community School	5-02	17	3	5.66
6	Paul Breen	Cashel Community School	3-07	16	3	5.33
7	Ruairí Ó Briain	Coláiste an Phiarsaigh	2-9	15	2	7.50
8	Rick Quigley	Thurles CBS	3-04	13	3	4.33
9	Patrick Kirby	St Colman's College	2-06	12	4	3.00
10	Brian Smiddy	Midleton CBS	0-12	12	3	4.00
