= 2003–04 Harty Cup =

Hurling tournament

2003–04 Dr Harty Cup
- Dates: September 2003 – 14 March 2004
- Sponsor: Irish Examiner
- Champions: St Flannan's College (20th title); Shane O'Brien (captain); Alan Dunne (manager)
- Runners-up: Coláistí na nDéise

The 2003–04 Harty Cup was the 84th staging of the Harty Cup since its establishment in hurling by the Munster Council of Gaelic Athletic Association in 1918.

St Colman's College were the defending champions.

The final was played on 14 March 2004 at Leahy Park in Cashel, between St Flannan's College and Coláistí na nDéise, in what was their first ever meeting in the final. St Flannan's College won the match by 3–15 to 1–08 to claim their 20th Harty Cup title overall and a first title in four years.

== Knockout stage ==
=== Final ===
14 March 2004 Final	St Flannan's College	3-15 - 1-08	Coláistí na nDéise	Leahy Park
	K Kennedy 2-2, D O'Halloran 1-2, B Gaffney 0-4, G Arthur 0-3, A Griffey, J Clancy 0-2 each.	Report	M Gorman 1-6, P Murray, J Gorman 0-1 each.
