= Cathal McCarthy =

Cathal McCarthy may refer to:

- Cathal McCarthy (hurler) (born 2002), Irish hurler
- Cathal McCarthy (footballer) (born 2006), Irish footballer
