= John Corcoran (dual player) =

Irish hurler and Gaelic footballer

Personal information
- Native name: Seán Ó Corcáin (Irish)
- Born: 1969 (age 56–57) Glounthaune, County Cork, Ireland

Sport
- Sport: Hurling
- Position: Right wing-forward
Clubs
- Years: Club
- Erin's Own → Imokilly
Club titles
- Cork titles: 1
Inter-county
Years	County	Apps (scores)
1992–1993	Cork	0 (0-00)
Inter-county titles
- Munster titles: 0
- All-Irelands: 0
- NHL: 1
- All Stars: 0

John Corcoran (born 1969) is an Irish former hurler and Gaelic footballer. At club level, he played with Erin's Own, divisional side Imokilly, and also lined out at inter-county level with various Cork teams.

== Career ==
Corcoran played hurling and Gaelic football at all levels as a student at Midleton CBS. He won a Dean Ryan Cup medal in 1986 after a 2-09 to 2-06 win over St Flannan's College in the final. Corcoran was also part of Midleton CBS's back-to-back final defeats in the Dr Harty Cup in 1986 and 1987.

At club level, Harte played hurling and Gaelic football with Erin's Own. He had just progressed to adult level when he won a Cork IHC medal in 1987 after a 1-06 to 0-08 defeat of Mallow in the final. Corcoran followed this by winning a Cork SHC medal in 1992, when Erin's Own claimed their inaugural title. He also had title successes as a Gaelic footballer, including three East Cork JAFC titles and a Cork JAFC title in 1994.

Corcoran first appeared on the inter-county scene with Cork as a dual player at minor level. He was an All-Ireland MHC runner-up in 1986, before losing the 1987 All-Ireland minor football final to Down. Corcoran later progressed to under-21 level and won an All-Ireland U21HC medal after Cork's 4-11 to 1-05 win over Kilkenny in the 1988 All-Ireland under-21 final. He was later added to the senior team and was part of Cork's National Hurling League-winning team in 1993.

== Honours ==
Midleton CBS

- Dean Ryan Cup: 1986

Erin's Own

- Cork Senior Hurling Championship: 1992
- Cork Intermediate Hurling Championship: 1987
- Cork Junior A Football Championship: 1994
- East Cork Junior A Football Championship: 1994, 2002, 2003

Cork

- National Hurling League: 1992–93
- All-Ireland Under-21 Hurling Championship: 1988
- Munster Under-21 Hurling Championship: 1988
- Munster Minor Football Championship: 1987
- Munster Minor Hurling Championship: 1986
