= 2000–01 Harty Cup =

Hurling tournament

2000–01 Dr Harty Cup
- Dates: 11 October 2000 – 25 March 2001
- Teams: 15
- Sponsor: Career Decisions
- Champions: St Colman's College (7th title); Brian Carey (captain); Denis Ring (manager)
- Runners-up: St Flannan's College; Adrian Fleming (captain); Mike McInerney (manager)

Tournament statistics
- Matches played: 15
- Goals scored: 45 (3 per match)
- Points scored: 290 (19.33 per match)
- Top scorer(s): Andrew O'Shaughnessy (5-11); Ciarán Ó Murchú (3-17); Andrew Quinn (2-20)

The 2000–01 Harty Cup was the 81st staging of the Harty Cup since its establishment in hurling by the Munster Council of Gaelic Athletic Association in 1918. The competition ran from 11 October 2000 to 25 March 2001.

St Flannan's College unsuccessfully defended its title.

St Colman's College won the Harty Cup final, 2–12 to 0–15, on 25 March 2001 at Páirc Caoimhín Ó Luing in Feenagh, against St Flannan's College, in what was their sixth meeting in the final overall and their first meeting since 1992. St Colman's College won their seventh successive Harty Cup title overall and a first title in 1997.

== Results ==
=== First round ===
11 October 2000 First round	Our Lady's Secondary School	2-12 - 1-12	Cashel Community School	The Ragg
	E Kelly 0-7, E Shortt 1-2, E Sweeney 1-0, P Shorrt 0-2, P Kelly 0-1.		P O'Flaherty 1-7, P Whelan 0-3, D Kennedy 0-1, M Coleman 0-1.

11 October 2000 First round	Midleton CBS	0-23 - 1-06	St Aidan's Community College	Páirc Séamus de Barra
	J Connolly 0-7, K Hartnett 0-4, C O'Keeffe 0-4, D Bowler 0-2, E Cotter 0-2, B Lordan 0-1, D O'Keeffe 0-1.		I Scott 0-4, D Kelleher 1-0, C O'Keeffe 0-2.

11 October 2000 First round	North Monastery	5-08 - 4-04	Limerick CBS	Fr Con Buckley Park
	S Ó hAilpín 2-5, S O'Sullivan 3-0, P Ahern 0-2, E Barry 0-1.		S Conway 1-2, P McInerney 1-1, M Fitzgerald 1-1, K Ryan 1-0.

16 October 2000 First round	Coláiste an Phiarsaigh	2-06 - 0-04	St Clement's College	Fr Con Buckley Park
	C Ó Murchú 1-4, M Mac Craith 1-0, S Ó Ceallacháin 0-1, B Ó Conaill 0-1.		E Foley 0-2, A Doherty 0-2.

16 October 2000 First round	St Colman's College	5-15 - 1-03	Ardscoil Rís	Clonmel GAA Ground
	P Kearney 2-3, B Carey 1-6, J Mulchinock 1-1, A O'Shaughnessy 1-0, R Murphy 0-2, L Philpott 0-2, S Kearney 0-1.		G Heagney 1-1, C Sherlock 0-2.

18 October 2000 First round	St Finbarr's College	2-14 - 2-04	Nenagh CBS	Páirc Caoimhín Ó Luing
	K Foley 0-6, D Lucey 0-5, R Duggan 1-1, J Horgan 1-1, J Gardiner 0-1.		D Kennedy 1-1, W Ryan 1-1, T Scroope 0-1, N Gleeson 0-1.

25 October 2000 First round	Thurles CBS	3-05 - 0-10	Coláiste Chríost Rí	Mitchelstown Grounds
	R Quigley 2-0, A Guilfoyle 0-5, J McGrath 1-0.		J Masters 0-7, D Cashman 0-1, B Dwyer 0-1, S Marshall 0-1.

=== Quarter-finals ===
15 November 2000 Quarter-final	St Colman's College	1-13 - 1-07	St Finbarr's College	Felix Sarsfield Memorial Park
	B Carey 0-9, A O'Shaughnessy 1-0, J Mulchinock 0-2, A Stack 0-1, P Kearney 0-1.		E McCarthy 1-0, D Lucey 0-3, K Foley 0-2, J Gardiner 0-2.

15 November 2000 Quarter-final	St Flannan's College	2-14 - 1-08	Our Lady's Secondary School	MacDonagh Park
	A Quinn 1-6, K Neylon 1-0, N Moran 0-3, D Kennedy 0-2, B Nugent 0-2, C Crowe 0-1.		P Shortt 1-3, E Kelly 0-4, D Burke 0-1.

15 November 2000 Quarter-final	Coláiste an Phiarsaigh	0-08 - 0-08	Midleton CBS	Páirc Séamus de Barra
	C Ó Murchú 0-6, S Ó Ceallacháin 0-1, R Ó Brian 0-1.		B Smiddy 0-4, S Kidney 0-2, J Connolly 0-1, D Bowler 0-1.

18 November 2000 Quarter-final	North Monastery	0-07 - 1-12	Thurles CBS	Páirc Mac Gearailt
	S Ó hAilpín 0-3, S O'Sullivan 0-1, M Lee 0-1, C Ó hAicéid 0-1, D Busteed 0-1.		A Guilfoyle 0-6, J O'Dwyer 1-0, R Quigley 0-3, C Ryan 0-2, R Stakelum 0-1.

23 November 2000 Quarter-final replay	Coláiste an Phiarsaigh	3-09 - 1-17 (aet)	Midleton CBS	Páirc Séamus de Barra
	C Ó Murchú 2-7, B Ó Conaill 1-0, S Ó Buachalla 0-1, A Finn 0-1.		B Smiddy 0-12, S Kidney 1-1, D Barry 0-2, D Bowler 0-1, L Healy 0-1.

=== Semi-finals ===
10 February 2001 Semi-final	St Flannan's College	3-13 - 0-04	Midleton CBS	Fr Con Buckley Park
	A Quinn 1-8, B Behan 1-0 (og), D Shannon 1-0, B Nugent 0-2, K Neylon 0-1, G O'Grady 0-1, D Kennedy 0-1.		B Smiddy 0-4.

11 February 2001 Semi-final	St Colman's College	2-11 - 0-06	Thurles CBS	Páirc Caoimhín Ó Luing
	A O'Shaughnessy 1-5, P Kearney 1-1, M O'Brien 0-3, B Carey 0-2.		A Guilfoyle 0-3, R Quigley 0-1, D Duggan 0-1, PJ Gleeson 0-1.

=== Final ===
25 March 2001 Final	St Colman's College	2-12 - 0-15	St Flannan's College	Páirc Caoimhín Ó Luing
	A O'Shaughnessy 2-6, B Carey 0-3, J Mulchinock 0-2, P Kearney 0-1.		A Quinn 0-6, K Neylon 0-3, B Nugent 0-3, N Moran 0-2, D Kennedy 0-1.	Referee: P Moore (Waterford)

== Statistics ==
=== Top scorers ===
Rank	Player	County	Tally	Total	Matches	Average
1	Andrew O'Shaughnessy	St Colman's College	5-11	26	4	6.50
1	Ciarán Ó Murchú	Coláiste an Phiarsaigh	3-17	26	3	8.66
1	Andrew Quinn	St Colman's College	2-20	26	3	8.66
4	Brian Carey	St Colman's College	1-20	23	4	5.75
5	Brian Smiddy	Midleton CBS	0-20	20	3	6.66
6	Paul Kearney	St Colman's College	3-06	15	4	3.75
7	Setanta Ó hAilpín	North Monastery	2-08	14	2	7.00
7	Alan Guilfoyle	Thurles CBS	0-14	14	3	4.66
9	Eddie Kelly	Our Lady's SS	0-11	11	2	5.50
10	Stephen O'Sullivan	North Monastery	3-01	10	2	5.00
10	Rick Quigley	Thurles CBS	2-04	10	3	3.33
10	Paddy O'Flaherty	Cashel Community School	1-07	10	1	10.00

=== Miscellaneous ===
- The final was postponed as all GAA activities were cancelled due to an out break of foot-and-mouth disease.
