= 1999–2000 Harty Cup =

Hurling tournament

1999–2000 Dr Harty Cup
- Dates: 13 October 1999 – 12 March 2000
- Teams: 15
- Sponsor: Career Decisions
- Champions: St Flannan's College (19th title); Ronan O'Looney (captain); John Minogue (manager)
- Runners-up: Our Lady's Secondary School; Aidan Ivers (captain); John Costigan (manager)

Tournament statistics
- Matches played: 16
- Goals scored: 45 (2.81 per match)
- Points scored: 323 (20.19 per match)
- Top scorer(s): Niall McGrath (3-28)

The 1999–2000 Harty Cup was the 80th staging of the Harty Cup since its establishment by the Munster Council of Gaelic Athletic Association in 1918. The competition ran from 13 October 1999 to 12 March 2000.

St Flannan's College were the defending champions.

The final was played on 12 March 2000 at MacDonagh Park in Nenagh, between St Flannan's College and Our Lady's Secondary School, in what was their first ever meeting in the final. St Flannan's College won the match by 3–14 to 3–08 to claim their 19th championship title overall and a third title in succession.

Nenagh CBS's Niall McGrath was the top scorer with 3-28.

== Results ==
=== First round ===
13 October 1999 First round	Our Lady's Secondary School	5-09 - 1-04	Coláiste Chríost Rí	Mitchelstown Grounds
	K Ivors 1-5, E Shortt 1-1, J Sweeney 1-0, D Owens 1-0, D Burke 1-0, P Brennan 0-1, E Kelly 0-1, P Burke 0-1.		T Guiheen 1-0, D Cashman 0-2, P Hegarty 0-1, J Masters 0-1.

13 October 1999 First round	St Flannan's College	4-19 - 0-09	Shannon Comprehensive School	O'Garney Park
	B Culbert 2-5, D Kennedy 1-2, A Quinn 0-4, N Moran 1-0, B Nugent 0-3, B Gantley 0-3, R Conlon 0-1, F Lynch 0-1.		B Kennedy 0-7, S Chaplin 0-2.

13 October 1999 First round	Thurles CBS	4-18 - 0-09	Coláiste Mhíchíl	MacDonagh Park
	T Ruth 1-3, W Dempsey 0-6, P Maher 1-2, F McCormack 1-0, D Duggan 1-0, E Costello 0-3, A Fogarty 0-3, J Joyce 0-1.		P Tobin 0-4, K Holmes 0-3, P McElligott 0-1, S Conway 0-1.

13 October 1999 First round	St Finbarr's College	0-14 - 0-04	St Colman's College	Fr Con Buckley Park
	T Kenny 0-6, P Tierney 0-2, M O'Connor 0-2, R Duggan 0-2, C O'Connor 0-1, K Foley 0-1.		J Mulchinock 0-2, P Kearney 0-1, D Fitzgerald 0-1.

13 October 1999 First round	Coláiste an Phiarsaigh	2-10 - 1-08	North Monastery	Ballinlough Grounds
	C Ó Murchú 1-8, B Ó Conaill 1-1, M Ó Floinn 0-1.		P Ahern 1-0, S Ó hAicéad 0-3, D McCarthy 0-2, C Ahern 0-1, D O'Connor 0-1, S O'Sullivan 0-1.

13 October 1999 First round	Midleton CBS	2-12 - 2-06	St Aidan's Community College	Páirc Séamus de Barra
	W Forrest 2-0, S Casey 0-5, E Cotter 0-4, K McCarthy 0-1, D Collins 0-1.		B Corcoran 2-5, P Burke 0-1.

13 October 1999 First round	Nenagh CBS	1-11 - 1-11	St Joseph's Secondary School	Gaelic Grounds
	N McGrath 1-6, D Hackett 0-2, B Quinn 0-2, W Keogh 0-1.		R Stewart 1-4, S Littleton 0-5, P Hassett 0-1, P Vaughan 0-1.

5 November 1999 First round replay	Nenagh CBS	0-13 - 0-04	St Joseph's Secondary School	Ballina Grounds
	N McGrath 0-7, D Hackett 0-2, B Quinn 0-2, C Gleeson 0-1, D Kennedy 0-1.		S Littleton 0-4.

=== Quarter-finals ===
10 November 1999 Quarter-final	St Flannan's College	1-16 - 0-07	St Finbarr's College	Páirc Caoimhín Ó Luing
	A Quinn 1-7, B Culbert 0-3, D Kennedy 0-3, F Lynch 0-2, D O'Grady 0-1.		T Kenny 0-5, M O'Connor 0-1, K Foley 0-1.

10 November 1999 Quarter-final	Our Lady's Secondary School	1-17 - 1-06	Coláiste an Phiarsaigh	Clonmel GAA Ground
	J Sweeney 0-13, K Fogarty 1-0, E Kelly 0-2, D Burke 0-1, E Shortt 0-1.		K Murphy 0-5, B O'Connell 1-0, M Corkery 0-1.

10 November 1999 Quarter-final	Thurles CBS	1-10 - 0-06	Midleton CBS	Mitchelstown Grounds
	A Fogarty 1-1, C Ryan 0-3, T Ruth 0-3, P Maher 0-2, G Joyce 0-1.		C Lomasney 0-3, B Smiddy 0-2, J Leahy 0-1.

17 November 1999 Quarter-final	Nenagh CBS	5-11 - 0-06	St Clement's College	Lacken Park
	N McGrath 1-5, B Quinn 2-1, Q Keogh 1-2, D Sutton 1-0, T Connolly 0-1, S Cramer 0-1, C Gleeson 0-1.		E Foley 0-4, P Carroll 0-1, C Collins 0-1.

=== Semi-finals ===
12 February 2000 Smei-final	St Flannan's College	1-10 - 1-08	Thurles CBS	FitzGerald Park
	A Quinn 1-7, N Moran 0-2, D Kennedy 0-1.	Report	C Ryan 0-4, G Joyce 1-0, A Fogarty 0-3, E Costello 0-1.

13 February 2000 Semi-final	Our Lady's Secondary School	1-12 - 1-12	Nenagh CBS	The Ragg
	J Sweeney 0-7, K Ivers 1-0, P Shortt 0-3, D Bergin 0-1, K Fogarty 0-1.	Report	N McGrath 1-6, D Hackett0-3, D Kennedy 0-1, B Quinn 0-1, W Keogh 0-1.

20 February 2000 Semi-final replay	Our Lady's Secondary School	1-13 - 2-09	Nenagh CBS	The Ragg
	J Sweeney 0-8, E Shorrt 1-1, P Shortt 0-2, P Brennan 0-1, E Kelly 0-1.		N McGrath 0-4, D Kennedy 1-0, B Quinn 1-0, M Ryan 0-3, W Keogh 0-1, D Hackett 0-1.

=== Final ===
12 March 2000 Final	St Flannan's College	3-14 - 3-08	Our Lady's Secondary School	MacDonagh Park
	B Culbert 2-3, A Quinn 0-6 (5f), B Gantley 1-0, J Culkin 0-3 (3f), D Kennedy 0-2.	Report	J Sweeney 0-5 (3f), P Burke, E Shortt 1-0 each, P Shortt 0-2 (2f), D Bourke 0-1.	Referee: J Sexton (Limerick)

== Competition statistics ==
=== Top scorers ===
Rank	Player	Club	Tally	Total	Matches	Average
1	Niall McGrath	Nenagh CBS	3-28	37	5	7.40
2	John Sweeney	Our Lady's SS	1-33	36	5	7.20
3	Andrew Quinn	St Flannan's College	2-24	30	4	7.50
4	Brian Culbert	St Flannan's College	4-11	23	4	5.75
5	Ciarán Ó Murchú	Coláiste an Phiarsaigh	1-13	16	2	8.00
