= Kieran Murphy (Erin's Own hurler) =

Irish hurler and Gaelic footballer

Personal information
- Native name: Ciarán Ó Murchú (Irish)
- Nickname: Hero
- Born: 10 April 1983 (age 43) Glounthaune, County Cork, Ireland
- Occupation: Bank official
- Height: 6 ft 3 in (191 cm)

Sport
- Sport: Hurling
- Position: Centre-forward
Club
- Years: Club
- 2000-present: Erin's Own
Club titles
- Cork titles: 2
Inter-county*
| Years | County | Apps (scores) |
| 2002-2009 | Cork | 11 (2-08) |
Inter-county titles
- Munster titles: 2
- All-Irelands: 1
- NHL: 0
- All Stars: 0
- *Inter County team apps and scores correct as of 18:28, 2 April 2018.

Kieran Murphy (born 10 April 1983) is an Irish hurler. At club level he played with Erin's Own and was also a member of the Cork senior hurling team.

== Early life ==
Born and raised in Glounthaune, County Cork, Murphy first played hurling and Gaelic football as a schoolboy with Coláiste an Phiarsaigh. He lined out in all grades during his time there, including in several Dr Harty Cup campaigns.

== Club career ==
Murphy's juvenile and underage career coincided with a successful period for the Erin's Own club. Beginning his career as a goalkeeper, he won a Cork MAHC title in 1998 following a 1–12 to 1–05 defeat of Ballinhassig in the final. This win earned promotion to the top minor grade, with Murphy claiming a Cork Premier MHC title in 1999 after a defeat of Glen Rovers. It was the first three successive Premier MHC titles, with Murphy also lining out in the victories over Glen Rovers in 2000 and Na Piarsaigh in 2001.

Murphy progressed to the club's under-21 team and also had success in this grade. He won a Cork U21AHC title following a defeat of Na Piarsaigh in 2002. Murphy added a second U21HC medal to his collection after a 2–08 to 0–08 defeat of Glen Rovers in 2004, in what was his last underage game for the club.

Just a month after his 17th birthday, Murphy made his senior debut for Erin's Own in May 2000. His first season on the team saw him line out in goal and ended with a 0–14 to 0–11 defeat by Newtownshandrum in the 2000 Cork SHC final. Murphy also played Gaelic football with the club and won a Cork JAFC title in 2005 after a one-point defeat of O'Donovan Rossa in the final.

By the time Erin's Own reached the final again in 2006, Murphy had become an outfield player. He claimed his first winners' medal that year following a 2–19 to 3–14 win over Cloyne. Murphy was appointed team captain the following year and won a second title after a 1–11 to 1–07 defeat of Newtownshandrum in the final.

Murphy lined out in his fourth SHC final in 2016, however, he ended the game on the losing side after a 0–19 to 2–11 defeat by Glen Rovers. He stepped away from the Erin's Own senior team at the end of the 2023 season, however, he continued for a 25th season of adult hurling with the club's intermediate team. Murphy was part of the team beaten by Lisgoold in the 2024 IAHC final replay.

== Inter-county career ==
Murphy began his inter-county career as a dual player at minor level in 2000. He won a Munster MFC medal that year before later claiming an All-Ireland MFC medal after a 2–12 to 0–13 defeat of Mayo in the 2000 All-Ireland MFC final. Murphy was again eligible for the minor grade in 2001 but switched codes to hurling. He ended the season by winning an All-Ireland MHC medal after a 2–10 to 1–08 defeat of Galway. Murphy subsequently spent three seasons with the under-21 teams as a dual player and won a Munster U21FC medal in 2004.

Murphy was just out of the minor grade when he joined both Cork's senior teams as a dual player in 2002. He won a Munster SFC medal that year as a non-playing substitute following a defeat of Tipperary in a replay. After ending his dual status, Murphy concentrated solely on hurling in 2005. He won his first Munster SHC medal that year after coming on as a substitute in the 1–21 to 1–16 defeat of Tipperary in the final. Murphy also started the 2005 All-Ireland final against Galway as a substitute but came on for Niall McCarthy to claim a winners' medal following the 1–21 to 1–16 victory. He won a second consecutive Munster SHC medal the following year as an unused substitute. Murphy was also an unused substitute when Cork had a three-point defeat by Kilkenny in the 2006 All-Ireland final.

Murphy was appointed team captain in 2007 as a result of Erin's Own Cork SHC triumph. He lost his place on the starting fifteen during the course of the championship and the captaincy moved to Joe Deane. Murphy continued to line out with Cork until 2009.

== Honours ==
Erin's Own

- Cork Senior Hurling Championship: 2006, 2007 (c)
- Cork Junior A Football Championship: 2005
- East Cork Junior A Football Championship: 2002, 2003, 2005, 2017 (c)
- Cork Premier Under-21 A Hurling Championship: 2002, 2004
- Cork Premier Minor Hurling Championship: 1999, 2000, 2001
- Cork Minor A Hurling Championship: 1998

Cork

- All-Ireland Senior Hurling Championship: 2005
- Munster Senior Hurling Championship: 2005, 2006
- Munster Senior Football Championship: 2002
- Munster Under-21 Football Championship: 2004
- All-Ireland Minor Hurling Championship: 2001
- All-Ireland Minor Football Championship: 2000
- Munster Minor Hurling Championship: 2000
- Munster Minor Football Championship: 2000

Sporting positions
| Preceded by Pat Mulcahy | Cork senior hurling team captain 2007 | Succeeded by Joe Deane |
