= 2005–06 Harty Cup =

2005–06 Dr Harty Cup
- Dates: 27 September 2005 – 12 March 2006
- Teams: 19
- Sponsor: Credit Union
- Champions: Midleton CBS (3rd title); Paudie O'Sullivan (captain); Seán Hurley (manager)
- Runners-up: St Flannan's College; Colm Madden (captain); Con Woods (manager)

The 2005–06 Harty Cup was the 86th staging of the Harty Cup since its establishment in hurling by the Munster Council of Gaelic Athletic Association in 1918. The competition was contested from 27 September 2005 to 12 March 2006.

St Flannan's College unsuccessfully defended its title at the Harty Cup final, 2–08 to 0–12, on 12 March 2006 at Leahy Park in Cashel, against Midleton CBS, in what was their third meeting in the final overall and a first final meeting in 1987. Midleton CBS won their third successive Harty Cup title overall and a first title since 1995.

== Knockout stage ==
=== Quarter-finals ===
25 January 2006 Quarter-final	Midleton CBS	2-13 - 2-08	Our Lady's Secondary School	Moore Park
	R White 1-3, P O'Sullivan 0-5, F Day 1-1, B Lawton 0-2, D Aherne 0-1, J Keane 0-1.		G Ryan 0-4, J Lupton 1-0, C Scully 1-0, N McGrath 0-3, S Bourke 0-1.

25 January 2006 Quarter-final	Thurles CBS	1-17 - 0-09	Charleville CBS	Childers Road
	P Bourke 0-7, J O'Neill 1-1, S Clohessy 0-3, L Dwan 0-2, T Hammersley 0-2, M Gleeson 0-1, J Barry 0-1.		R Clifford 0-7, G Morrissey 0-2.

25 January 2006 Quarter-final	St Flannan's College	1-14 - 0-10	Coláistí na nDéise	Leahy Park
	C Tierney 0-6, C Nealon 1-1, R Horan 0-2, J Neylon 0-2, D Stack 0-1, M Earley 0-1, D Ryan 0-1.		G O'Gorman 0-4, P Murray 0-3, S Fives 0-2, B Phelan 0-1.

25 January 2006 Quarter-final	St Colman's College	0-13 - 2-07	Nenagh CBS	New Inn Grounds
	A Mannix 0-10, E Barry 0-2, M O'Callaghan 0-1.		D Gleeson 1-1, P Murphy 1-0, D Nolan 0-2, D Maher 0-2, R Duff 0-1, J Conroy 0-1.

1 February 2006 Quarter-final replay	St Colman's College	2-15 - 1-05	Nenagh CBS	Childers Road
	A Mannix 0-7, S Kearney 1-2, M O'Callaghan 1-1, E Barry 0-3, S Walsh 0-1, S Cotter 0-1.		R Duff 1-0, D Gleeson 0-3, T Dunne 0-1, B Maxwell 0-1.

=== Semi-finals ===
12 February 2006 Semi-final	St Flannan's College	2-14 - 0-10	St Colman's College	Childers Road
	C Nealon 1-3, R Horan 1-1, J Neylon 0-2, C Tierney 0-2, B Coffey 0-2, M Earley 0-1, E Barrett 0-1, D Ryan 0-1, D Stack 0-1.		A Mannix 0-9, S Cotter 0-1.

18 February 2006 Semi-final	Midleton CBS	3-08 - 0-16	Thurles CBS	Páirc Mac Gearailt
	L O'Farrell 3-1, F Day 0-5, R White 0-1, P Haughney 0-1.		P Bourke 0-7, K Clohessy 0-4, T Hammersley 0-2, L Dwane 0-2, J Barry 0-1.

=== Final ===
12 March 2006 Final	Midleton CBS	2-08 - 0-12	St Flannan's College	Leahy Park
	R White 0-5, E O'Keeffe 1-1, L O'Farrell 1-0, B Lawton 0-1, P O'Sullivan 0-1.		C Tierney 0-3, D Ryan 0-2, R Horan 0-2, C Nealon 0-1, S Stack 0-1, C Madden 0-1, M Earley 0-1, S Hickey 0-1.	Referee: M O'Connor (Limerick)
