= Patrick Kirby =

Irish hurler

Personal information
- Native name: Pádraig Ó Ciarba (Irish)
- Born: 1985 (age 40–41) Knockainey, County Limerick, Ireland
- Occupation: Sales rep

Sport
- Sport: Hurling
- Position: Full-forward
Club
- Years: Club
- Knockainey
Club titles
- Limerick titles: 0
Inter-county
- Years: County
- 2003-2006: Limerick
Inter-county titles
- Munster titles: 0
- All-Irelands: 0
- NHL: 0
- All Stars: 0

Patrick Kirby (born 1985) is an Irish former hurler. At club level, he played with Knockainey and at inter-county level with the Limerick senior hurling team.

== Career ==
Kirby played hurling at all grades as a student at John the Baptist Community School in Hospital. He later transferred to St Colman's college in Fermoy and won back-to-back Dr Harty Cup titles in 2002 and 2003. Kirby also won an All-Ireland Colleges SHC medal following an 0–11 to 2–4 win over St Kieran's College in the 2002 All-Ireland colleges final.

At club level, Kirby first played for Knockainey as a dual player in the juvenile and underage grades, before progressing to adult level. At just 16-years-old, he wasp art of the team when Knockainey claimed the Limerick IHC title in 2001 after a 2–13 to 1–9 win over Mungret in a final replay.

Kirby first appeared on the inter-county scene with Limerick during a three-year tenure with the minor team. He was just 17 and in his second year of the minor grade when he was drafted onto the Limerick under-21 team in 2002. Kirby won a Munster U21HC medal that year before later collecting an All-Ireland U21HC medal after the 3–17 to 0–8 win over Galway in the 2002 All-Ireland under-21 final. He made his senior team debut in 2003 and made a number of appearances before leaving the panel in 2006.

== Honours ==
St Colman's College

- Dr Croke Cup: 2002
- Dr Harty Cup: 2002, 2003

Knockainey

- Limerick Intermediate Hurling Championship: 2001

Limerick

- All-Ireland Under-21 Hurling Championship: 2002
- Munster Under-21 Hurling Championship: 2002
