= 1998–99 Harty Cup =

Hurling tournament

1998–99 Dr Harty Cup
- Dates: 14 October 1998 – 7 March 1999
- Champions: St Flannan's College (18th title)
- Runners-up: St Finbarr's College

The 1998–99 Harty Cup was the 79th staging of the Harty Cup since its establishment in hurling by the Munster Council of Gaelic Athletic Association in 1918. The competition ran from 14 October 1998 to 7 March 1999.

St Flannan's College successfully defended its title in the Harty Cup final on 7 March 1999 at Páirc Caoimhín Ó Luing in Feenagh, against St Finbarr's College, 1–14 to 1–08, in what was their fourth successive meeting in a final overall and a first meeting in 27 years for their 18th successive Harty Cup title overall and a consecutive title since the previous season.

== Results ==
=== Quarter-finals ===
| 11 November 1998 Quarter-final | St Colman's College | 2-07 - 0-03 | Midleton CBS | Castle Grounds |
| | P O'Regan 1-1, C O'Kane 0-4, P Tobin 1-0, L Kearney 0-1, P Murray 0-1. | | L Aherne 0-2, V Mounsey 0-1. |

| 11 November 1998 Quarter-final | St Flannan's College | 4-06 - 1-06 | Limerick CBS | MacDonagh Park |
| | A Quinn 2-4, B Dunne 1-1, K McNamara 1-0, G Quinn 0-1. | | M Cahill 1-0, K Tobin 0-3, W Walsh 0-2, K Holmes 0-1. |

| 2 December 1998 Quarter-final | St Finbarr's College | 3-16 - 2-02 | North Monastery | Páirc Uí Rinn |
| | J Russell 0-5, F Hickey 1-1, R Murphy 1-1, K Foley 1-1, M O'Connor 0-4, C Fitzgerald 0-4. | | B O'Leary 1-0, D McCarthy 1-0, S O'Sullivan 0-2. |

| Quarter-final | Our Lady's Secondary School | w/o - scr. | Thurles CBS |

=== Semi-finals ===
| 13 February 1999 Semi-final | St Flannan's College | 0-10 - 0-08 | St Colman's College | Páirc Caoimhín Ó Luing |
| | A Quinn 0-5, B Dunne 0-3, G Quinn 0-1, R Conlon 0-1. | | C O'Kane 0-5, D McNamara 0-1, J Culloty 0-1, B Carey 0-1. |

| 14 February 1999 Semi-final | Our Lady's Secondary School | 0-09 - 1-06 | St Finbarr's college | Michael Fox Park |
| | T O'Connor 0-6, J Sweeney 0-2, D Murray 0-1. | | J Gardiner 1-1, T Kenny 0-2, M O'Connor 0-1, R Murphy 0-1, F Hickey 0-1. |

| 21 February 1999 Semi-final replay | Our Lady's Secondary School | 1-06 - 2-05 | St Finbarr's college | Michael Fox Park |
| | T O'Connor 0-4, M Cahill 1-0, B Fitzgerald 0-2. | | F Hickey 1-1, J Gardiner 1-0, M O'Connor 0-2, T Kenny 0-1, J Russell 0-1. |

=== Final ===
| 7 March 1999 Final | St Flannan's College | 1-14 - 1-08 | St Finbarr's College | Páirc Caoimhín Ó Luing |
| | A Quinn 0-7, B Dunne 1-1, B Gantley, T Griffin 0-2 each, G Quinn, R Conlon 0-1 each. | Report | K Foley 1-1, T Kenny 0-4, M O'Connor 0-3. |
