= Cathal McCarthy (hurler) =

Irish hurler (born 2002)

Personal information
- Native name: Cathal Mac Cárthaigh (Irish)
- Born: 2002 (age 23–24) Glanmire, County Cork, Ireland
- Occupation: Student
- Height: 6 ft 0 in (183 cm)

Sport
- Sport: Hurling
- Position: Right corner-back
Club
- Years: Club
- 2021-present: Sarsfields
Club titles
- Cork titles: 1
College
- Years: College
- 2021-present: University College Cork
College titles
- Fitzgibbon titles: 0
Inter-county*
| Years | County | Apps (scores) |
| 2023-present | Cork | 0 (0-00) |
Inter-county titles
- Munster titles: 0
- All-Irelands: 0
- NHL: 1
- All Stars: 0
- *Inter County team apps and scores correct as of 21:05, 24 July 2024.

Cathal McCarthy (born 2002) is an Irish hurler. At club level he plays with Sarsfields and at inter-county level with the Cork senior hurling team.

== Early life ==
Born and raised in Glanmire, McCarthy first played hurling while at school at Coláiste an Phiarsaigh in Glanmire. He played in all grades before progressing to the school's senior team and lined out in various Munster competitions. McCarthy later studied at University College Cork and was added to their Fitzgibbon Cup panel in 2023.

== Club career ==
McCarthy first played for the Sarsfields club at juvenile and underage levels. He was at centre-back when Sarsfields were beaten 2–21 to 3–11 by St Finbarr's in the Cork Premier 1 MHC final in 2020.

McCarthy made his senior championship debut with Sarsfields in a 2–28 to 2–12 defeat of Na Piarsaigh in September 2021. He quickly became a regular member of starting fifteen and was part of the Sarsfields team that won the Cork PSHC title after a 0–21 to 0–19 defeat of Midleton in the 2023 final.

== Inter-county career ==
McCarthy first appeared on the inter-county scene with Cork as a member of the under-20 team in 2021. Success in this grade was immediate with McCarthy claiming Munster and All-Ireland U20HC medals as a member of the extended panel after respective defeats of Limerick and Galway. He broke onto the starting fifteen in 2022, in a year which saw the campaign ended with a defeat by Tipperary.

McCarthy earned a call-up to the senior team in December 2023 and was at corner-back for a 1–24 to 1–23 defeat by University College Cork in the pre-season Canon O'Brien Cup. McCarthy remained a part of the Cork training panel and was a member of the extended panel when Clare beat Cork by 3–29 to 1–34 in the 2024 All-Ireland final.

== Honours ==
Sarsfields

- Cork Premier Senior Hurling Championship: 2023

Cork

- National Hurling League: 2025
- All-Ireland Under-20 Hurling Championship: 2021
- Munster Under-20 Hurling Championship: 2021
