= 2004–05 Harty Cup =

Hurling tournament

2004–05 Dr Harty Cup
- Dates: September 2004 – 12 March 2005
- Sponsor: Irish Examiner
- Champions: St Flannan's College (21st title)
- Runners-up: Thurles CBS

The 2004–05 Harty Cup was the 85th staging of the Harty Cup since its establishment in hurling by the Munster Council of Gaelic Athletic Association in 1918.

St Flannan's College were the defending champions.

The final was played on 12 March 2005 at MacDonagh Park in Nenagh, between St Flannan's College and Thurles CBS, in what was their fourth meeting in the final overall. St Flannan's College won the match by 1–11 to 1–06 to claim their 21st Harty Cup title overall and a second consecutive title.

== Knockout stage ==
=== Final ===
12 March 2005 Final	St Flannan's College	1-11 - 1-06	Thurles CBS	MacDonagh Park
	C Ryan 0-6 (4f), B Gaffney 1-1; C Madden 0-2; G arthur 0-1, N Killeen 0-1.	Report	T Hammersley 1-0, B Moran 0-2 (1f), J Coughlan, D Kirby, I Maher, P Bourke 0-1 each.
