= 1997–98 Harty Cup =

Hurling tournament

1997–98 Dr Harty Cup
- Dates: 15 October 1997 – 15 March 1998
- Teams: 15
- Sponsor: Career Decisions
- Champions: St Flannan's College (17th title); Brian Clancy (captain); John Minogue (manager)
- Runners-up: Limerick CBS; Seán O'Connor (captain); Pat Fleury (manager)

Tournament statistics
- Matches played: 15
- Goals scored: 30 (2 per match)
- Points scored: 295 (19.67 per match)
- Top scorer(s): Cathal McCarthy (2-19); Neil Ronan (1-22)

The 1997–98 Harty Cup was the 78th staging of the Harty Cup since its establishment in hurling by the Munster Council of Gaelic Athletic Association in 1918. The competition ran from 15 October 1997 to 15 March 1998.

St Colman's College unsuccessfully defended its title, in the semi-finals losing to St Flannan's College.

St Flannan's College won in the Harty Cup final on 15 March 1998 at MacDonagh Park in Nenagh, against Limerick CBS, in what was their fifth successive meeting in a final overall, their first meeting in a final was in 1993.

0–12 to 0–05 to claim their 17th Harty Cup title overall and a first title in seven years.[4]

Cathal McCarthy and Neil Ronan were the joint-top scorers.

== Results ==
=== First round ===
15 October 1997 First round	St Colman's College	2-17 - 0-08	St Finbarr's College	Felix Sarsfield Memorial Park
	N Ronan 0-10, E Fitzgerald 1-5, S McCarthy 1-1, W O'Leary 0-1.		A Shanahan 0-5, T Kenny 0-1, M O'Connor 0-1, D McSweeney 0-1.

15 October 1997 First round	Midleton CBS	0-11 - 0-07	Nenagh CBS	Clonmel GAA Ground
	D Leahy 0-5, M Lawton 0-1, J Flavin 0-1, N McCarthy 0-1, D Ring 0-1, S O'Farrell 0-1, L Ahern 0-1.		M McNamara 0-4, B Timmons 0-2, B McGrath 0-2.

15 October 1997 First round	Coláiste Chríost Rí	3-12 - 0-00	Lismore CBS	Páirc Mac Gearailt
	C McCarthy 1-5, R O'Dwyer 1-4, E Byrne 1-2, A Fitzpatrick 0-1.

15 October 1997 First round	Ardscoil Rís	3-09 - 0-08	De La Salle College Waterford	Cahir Grounds
	C Dolan 1-2, S Kerins 1-1, M Lynch 1-0, S Joyce 0-3, K Bermingham 0-2, R Liddane 0-1.		R Carroll 0-2, C Begadon 0-2, T Lannigan 0-2, M Frisby 0-1, J Mullane 0-1.

15 October 1997 First round	Limerick CBS	1-11 - 0-09	North Monastery	Fr Con Buckley Park
	M Cahill 1-2, K Tobin 0-3, S O'Connor 0-2, J Shanahan 0-1, K Holmes 0-1, P McCarthy 0-1, C Maher 0-1.		J Egan 0-5, S O'Driscoll 0-2, S O'Sullivan 0-1, E Barry 0-1.

15 October 1997 First round	St Clement's College	1-21 - 0-06	Scarriff Community School	MacDonagh Park
	C Fitzgerald 0-10, K Carey 0-6, D Bennis 1-0, C Moriarty 0-3, P Butler 0-1, O Foley 0-1.		M O'Brien 0-2, K McNamara 0-1, F McNamara 0-1, B O'Grady 0-1, K Mason 0-1.

15 October 1997 First round	Thurles CBS	2-11 - 1-13	Presentation De La Salle, Hospital	Cappamore Grounds
	C Ryan 0-7, S Butler 1-1, PJ McCormack 1-0, C Everard 0-2, S Everard 0-1.		C Hickey 0-10, D Grimes 1-0, D Reale 0-2, G O'Shea 0-1.

- St Flannan's College received a bye in this round after Charleville CBS withdrew.

=== Quarter-finals ===
12 November 1997 Quarter-final	St Colman's College	1-22 - 2-06	Midleton CBS	Felix Sarsfield Memorial Park
	N Ronan 1-8, C O'Kane 0-4, P Davern 0-4, D McNamara 0-3, E Fitzgerald 0-2, S McCarthy 0-1.		M O'Connell 1-0, S Farrell 1-0, J Flavin 0-3, D Ring 0-2, E O'Sullivan 0-1.

12 November 1997 Quarter-final	St Flannan's College	3-11 - 1-04	Thurles CBS	Cappamore Grounds
	S Mullane 1-1, M Greaney 1-0, H Flavin 1-0, B Clancy 0-3, J Casey 0-3, G Quinn 0-2, G Considine 0-1, C Shouldice 0-1.		P Butler 1-0, C Ryan 0-2, S Butler 0-2.

12 November 1997 Quarter-final	St Clement's College	0-10 - 0-10	Limerick CBS	Gaelic Grounds
	C Fitzgerald 0-4, K Carey 0-2, O Foley 0-2, C Moriarty 0-1, P O'Reilly 0-1.		K Tobin 0-4, J Shanahan 0-2, S O'Connor 0-2, C Godfrey 0-1, P McCarthy 0-1.

12 November 1997 Quarter-final	Coláiste Chríost Rí	2-08 - 0-11	Ardscoil Rís	Micheal Fox Park
	C McCarthy 1-6, W Cummins 1-0, R Dwyer 0-1, A Fitzpatrick 0-1.		C Dolan 0-3, R Liddane 0-2, S Kerins 0-2, K Farrell 0-1, J Galvin 0-1, B Meskell 0-1, K Bermingham 0-1.

26 November 1997 Quarter-final replay	St Clement's College	1-08 - 3-06	Limerick CBS	Gaelic Grounds
	K Carey 1-1, C Fitzgerald 0-4, C Moriarty 0-2, P Butler 0-1.		K Tobin 0-4, C Godfrey 1-0, C Maher 1-0, J Shanahan 1-0, K Holmes 0-2.

=== Semi-finals ===
8 February 1998 Semi-final	Limerick CBS	2-11 - 2-10	Coláiste Chríost Rí	Fr Con Buckley Park
	K Tobin 1-4, P McCarthy 1-1, M Cahill 0-2, B O'Connor 0-2, W Walsh 0-1, G Godfrey 0-1.		C McCarthy 0-8, E Byrne 1-1, R McCarthy 1-1.

15 February 1998 Semi-final	St Flannan's College	0-10 - 0-08	St Colman's College	Páirc Caoimhín Ó Luing
	J Casey 0-3, S Mullane 0-2, M Greaney 0-1, B Clancy 0-1, H Flavin 0-1, T Carmody 0-1, R Conlon 0-1.		N Ronan 0-4, E Fitzgerald 0-3, S McCarthy 0-1.

=== Final ===
15 March 1998 Final	St Flannan's College	0-12 - 0-05	Limerick CBS	MacDonagh Park
	J Casey 0-4 (all frees), G Considine 0-3, T Carmody and C O'Reilly 0-2 each, S Mullane 0-1. St Michael's:	Report	K Tobin 0-4 (two frees), J Shanahan 0-1.

== Championship statistics ==
=== Top scorers ===
Rank	Player	County	Tally	Total	Matches	Average
1	Cathal McCarthy	Coláiste Chríost Rí	2-19	25	3	8.33
1	Neil Ronan	St Colman's College	1-22	25	3	8.33
3	Kevin Tobin	Limerick CBS	1-19	22	5	4.40
4	Conor Fitzgerald	St Clement's College	0-18	18	3	6.00
5	Eoin Fitzgerald	St Colman's College	1-10	13	3	4.33
