= 1994 Cork Junior A Football Championship =

- Dates: 24 September – 13 November 1994
- Teams: 8
- Champions: Erin's Own (1st title); Denis Collins (captain); Seán Murphy (manager)
- Runners-up: Kiskeam; Maurice Angland (captain)

Tournament statistics
- Matches played: 8
- Goals scored: 22 (2.75 per match)
- Points scored: 156 (19.5 per match)
- Top scorer(s): Jimmy Dennehy (2–14)

The 1994 Cork Junior A Football Championship was the 96th staging of the Cork Junior A Football Championship since its establishment by Cork County Board in 1895. The championship ran from 24 September to 13 November 1994.

The final was played on 13 November 1994 at the Castle Grounds in Macroom, between Erin's Own and Kiskeam, in what was their first ever meeting in the final. Erin's Own won the match by 0–15 to 2–07 to claim their first ever championship title.

== Qualification ==
Division	Championship	Champions
Avondhu	North Cork Junior A Football Championship	Kildorrery
Beara	Beara Junior A Football Championship	Adrigole
Carbery	South West Junior A Football Championship	Kilbrittain
Carrigdhoun	South East Junior A Football Championship	Shamrocks
Duhallow	Duhallow Junior A Football Championship	Kiskeam
Imokilly	East Cork Junior A Football Championship	Erin's Own
Muskerry	Mid Cork Junior A Football Championship	Béal Átha'n Ghaorthaidh
Seandún	City Junior A Football Championship	Passage

== Results ==
=== Quarter-finals ===
24 September 1994 Quarter-final	Passage	0–08 – 0–08	Shamrocks	Crosshaven Grounds
	J O'Neill 0–3, L Lester 0–2, B Harrington 0–2, K O'Brien 0–1.		M Hickey 0–2, D Collins 0–1, J Dineen 0–1, K O'Mahony 0–1, P Ryan 0–1, P Murphy 0–1, E Ó Cearúil 0–1.

15 October 1994 Quarter-final	Erin's Own	1–13 – 1–08	Béal Átha'n Ghaorthaidh	Ballincollig Grounds
	J Dillon 1–1, J Corcoran 0–3, T O'Keeffe 0–3, P Geasley 0–1, T Kelleher 0–1, P McNamara 0–1, M Mulcahy 0–1, C Dillon 0–1.		J O'Driscoll 0–6, K Concannon 1–1, S Twomey 0–1, P O'Leary 0–1.

16 October 1994 Quarter-final	Kiskeam	1–09 – 0–11	Adrigole	Inchigeelagh Grounds
	J Dennehy 1–3, T Scannell 0–2, R Dennehy 0–2, R Murphy 0–1, J Herlihy 0–1.		M Harrington 0–6, M O'Sullivan 0–2, D O'Sullivan 0–2, D Harrington 0–1.

16 October 1994 Quarter-final replay	Passage	2–11 – 3–07	Shamrocks	Crosshaven Grounds
	K O'Brien 2–5, G Murphy 0–4, T Howard 0–1, S O'Flynn 0–1.		J Dineen 1–2, A O'Driscoll 1–1, E Ó Cearúil 1–0, J O'Callaghan 0–3, A Geary 0–1.

22 October 1994 Quarter-final	Kilbrittain	4–05 – 0–13	Kildorrery	Páirc Liam Mhic Cárthaigh
	M Holland 1–1, D O'Connell 1–0, J O'Connell 1–0, O Sexton 1–0, C O'Donoghue 0–3, F O'Shea 0–1.		D Walsh 0–9, J Piggott 0–1, M O'Sullivan 0–1, M Monaghan 0–1, D Walsh 0–1.

=== Semi-finals ===
30 October 1994 Semi-final	Kiskeam	4–11 – 3–07	Kilbrittain	Castle Grounds
	J Herlihy 3–1, J Dennehy 0–5, F Murphy 0–2, M Angland 0–1, D Sheehan 0–1, R Dennehy 0–1.		C O'Donoghue 1–3, D O'Connell 1–0, F Sheehy 1–0, M Holland 0–2, F O'Mahony 0–1, O Sexton 0–1.

30 October 1994 Semi-final	Erin's Own	1–18 – 0–05	Passage	Páirc Uí Rinn
	J Corcoran 0–7, J Dillon 1–3, P McNamara 0–3, B Corcoran 0–1, C Dillon 0–1, P Geasley 0–1, T Kelleher 0–1, K Murphy 0–1,		T O'Neill 0–2, K O'Brien 0–2, K Harrington 0–1.

=== Final ===
13 November 1994 Final	Erin's Own	0–15 – 2–07	Kiskeam	Castle Grounds
	J Corcoran 0–6 (0–3 frees, 0–1 '45), C Dillon 0–3, J Dillon 0–2, T Kelleher 0–2, B O'Neill 0–1, B Corcoran 0–1	Report	J Dennehy 1–6 (0–2 frees), D Sheahan 1–0, J Herlihy 0–1.	Referee: J Cummins (Glanworth)

== Championship statistics ==
=== Top scorers ===
Overall

Rank	Player	Club	Tally	Total	Matches	Average
1	Jimmy Dennehy	Kiskeam	2–14	20	3	6.66
2	John Corcoran	Erin's Own	0–16	16	3	5.33
3	Kevin O'Brien	Passage	2–08	14	3	4.66
4	John Herlihy	Kiskeam	3–03	12	3	4.00
4	John Dillon	Erin's Own	2–06	12	3	4.00
