= Maurice O'Brien =

Irish hurler

Personal information
- Native name: Muiris Ó Briain (Irish)
- Nickname: Mossy
- Born: 28 September 1983 (age 43) Limerick, Ireland
- Occupation: Quantity Surveyor
- Height: 5 ft 10 in (178 cm)

Sport
- Sport: Hurling
- Position: Midfield
Clubs
- Years: Club
- 2009–2014: Garryspillane; Faughs
Inter-county
- Years: County
- 2003–2008 2009–2013: Limerick; Dublin
Inter-county titles
- Leinster titles: 1 (Dublin)
- NHL: 1 (Dublin)

Maurice O'Brien (born 28 September 1983) is a Limerick-born senior hurler for Dublin and Faughs. He made his debut for Dublin in 2009 against his native Limerick in the National Hurling League. During his time with Dublin he has won one Leinster Senior Hurling Championship winner's medal (2013) one National Hurling League winner's medal and has been a runner-up in two Leinster finals.

Maurice has won the All-Ireland Under 21 Hurling Championship and the Munster U21 championship with Limerick in 2001 and 2002. He made his championship debut with Limerick in 2003 against Offaly in the All Ireland Qualifiers.

O'Brien Won 2 Dr Harty Cup's and 2 All Ireland College's (Dr Croke Cup) with St Colmans College, Fermoy in 2001 & 2002, He also won a Fitzgibbon Cup medal with Limerick Institute of technology (LIT) in 2007.

O'Brien hung up his boots in August 2013.
