= 2001 All-Ireland Minor Hurling Championship =

All-Ireland Minor Hurling Championship 2001
Championship Details
- Dates: 21 April 2001 – 9 September 2001
- Teams: 16

All Ireland Champions
- Winners: Cork (18th win)
- Captain: Tomás O'Leary
- Manager: John Considine

All Ireland Runners-up
- Runners-up: Galway
- Captain: Ger Farragher
- Manager: Josie Harte

Provincial Champions
- Munster: Tipperary
- Leinster: Kilkenny
- Ulster: Derry
- Connacht: Not Played

Championship Statistics
- Matches Played: 22
- Top Scorer: Kieran Murphy (5-38)

The 2001 All-Ireland Minor Hurling Championship was the 71st staging of the All-Ireland Minor Hurling Championship, the Gaelic Athletic Association's premier under-18 inter-county hurling tournament. The championship began on 21 April 2001 and ended on 9 September 2001.

Galway were the defending champions and were hoping to win a third successive championship.

On 9 September 2001, Cork won the championship following a 2–10 to 1–8 defeat of Galway in the All-Ireland final. This was their 18th All-Ireland title, their first in three championship seasons. It remains their last All-Ireland victory.

Cork's Kieran Murphy was the championship's top scorer with 5-28.

== Results ==
=== Leinster Minor Hurling Championship ===
Round robin

	Team	Pld	W	D	L	SF	SA	SD	Pts
1	Offaly	3	3	0	0	10-35	2-23	36	6
2	Dublin	3	2	0	1	6-34	1-31	18	4
3	Laois	3	1	0	2	9-30	9-30	0	2
4	Westmeath	3	0	0	3	2-24	15-39	-54	0

21 April 2001 Round 1	Westmeath	0-08 - 4-10	Offaly	Cusack Park, Mullingar
	R Whelan 0-4, D Carthy 0-1, J Coyle 0-1, A Mitchell 0-1, A Clinton 0-1		K Kelly 2-3, B Carroll 0-5, D Hayden 1-2, M Dwayne 1-0.

21 April 2001 Round 1	Dublin	2-14 - 0-06	Laois	Parnell Park, Dublin
	D O’Callaghan 1-4, N Ó Ceallacháin 1-2, P Bradshaw 0-5, S Hiney 0-2, S Fee 0-1.		B Ferns 0-2, F Deegan 0-2, T Fitzgerald 0-1, A Kingsley 0-1.	Referee: F Smith (Meath)

28 April 2001 Round 2	Westmeath	0-10 - 3-11	Dublin	Robinstown Sportsfield
	R Whelan 0-4, B Connaughton 0-2, A Clinton 0-1, M McNicholas 0-1, D Carty 0-1, JP Farrelly 0-1.		D O’Callaghan 0-9, S Fee 2-1, A Glennon 1-0, C Keogh 0-1.

28 April 2001 Round 2	Offaly	5-10 - 1-06	Laois	St. Brendan's Park, Birr
	K Kelly 3-5, P Cummins 1-2, D Dwane 1-0, B Carroll 0-3.		C O’Neill 1-1, P Grey 0-3, T Fitzgerald 0-1, P Brady 0-1.

5 May 2001 Round 3	Laois	8-18 - 2-06	Westmeath	O'Moore Park, Portlaoise
	B Ferns 3-1, B Fitzgerald 2-1, Jas Walsh 2-1, T Fitzgerald 0-7, J Hoban 1-0, A Kirwan 0-2, J Dowling 0-2, L Phelan 0-2, D Walsh 0-2.		D McCarthy 1-2, D McNicholas 1-2, B Connaughton 0-1, C Doran 0-1.

12 May 2001 Round 3	Offaly	0-15 - 1-09	Dublin	St. Brendan's Park, Birr
	B Carroll 0-8, S Browne 0-3, W Buckley 0-2, S Delaney 0-1, A McRedmond 0-1.		M Canton 1-0, P Bradshaw 0-3, T Sweeney 0-2, A Glennon 0-1, R Fallon 0-1, L Barrett 0-1, S Hiney 0-1.

Semi-finals

27 June 2001 Semi-final	Wexford	2-14 – 2-09	Offaly	Dr. Cullen Park, Carlow
	R Jacob 2-3, D Mythen 0-5, S Howard and M Cash 0-2 each, A Flynn and D Browne 0-1 each.	Report	B Carroll 0-4, K Kelly and M Dwane 1-1 each. P Cummins, D Hayden and S Brown 0 -1 each.	Referee: A Stapleton (Laois)

27 June 2001 Semi-final	Kilkenny	1-14 – 1-06	Dublin	Dr. Cullen Park, Carlow
	W O'Dwyer 0-5, B Dowling 0-3, R Dowling 1-0, E Kavanagh 0-2, M Phelan, C Phelan, S Hennessy, K Clear 0-1 each.	Report	D O'Callaghan 1-4, S Hiney and P Bradshaw 0-1 each.	Referee: J Sheridan (Kildare)

Final

8 July 2001 Final	Kilkenny	3-16 – 1-09	Wexford	Croke Park, Dublin
	S Hennessy 1-1, C Phelan, B Dowling 0-4 each, R Dowling, E Kavanagh 1-0 each, T Walsh 0-2, PJ Delaney 0-2, 1 free, 1 '65, M Walsh, M Phelan, W O'Dwyer 0-1 each.	Report	R Jacob 1-1, D Mythen 0-4, 2 frees, T Hawkins, C Dempsey, A Flynn, S Howard 0-1 each.	Referee: J McGrath (Westmeath)

=== Munster Minor Hurling Championship ===
Quarter-finals

25 April 2001 Quarter-final	Tipperary	2-16 – 0-08	Kerry	Semple Stadium, Thurles
	T Ivors 2-0, P Shortt 0-5, D Morrissey 0-3, D Kennedy and D Fitzgerald 0-2 each, C O'Mahoney, J Kennedy, F Devanney and D Walton 0-1 each.	Report	M Conway 0-5, A Boyle 0-2, I McCarthy 0-1.	Referee: A Hegney (Clare)

25 April 2001 Quarter-final	Cork	1-15 – 0-07	Waterford	Páirc Uí Chaoimh, Cork
	S Ó hAilpín 1-3, K Murphy (Sars) 0-4 (3 frees), K Murphy (Erins Own) 0-4 (2 frees), T O'Leary 0-2, R McDonnell, F Murphy 0-1 each.	Report	K Stafford 0-3 (3f), S Walsh 0-3 (3f), J Hurney 0-1.	Referee: J O'Mahony (Limerick)

Semi-finals

9 May 2001 Semi-final	Tipperary	0-08 – 0-08	Clare	Gaelic Grounds, Limerick
	P Shortt (0-2), C O'Mahony (0-2), D Kennedy (0-1), T Ivors (0-1), J Kennedy (0-1), D Morrissey (0-1).	Report	A Quinn (0-3), M Madden (0-2), D Shannon (0-1), G O'Grady (0-1), T O'Donovan (0-1).	Referee: J Sexton (Cork)

9 May 2001 Semi-final	Cork	2-15 – 1-11	Limerick	Semple Stadium, Thurles
	K Murphy (1-11), S Ó hAilpín (1-2), T O'Leary (0-1), J Gardiner (0-1).		N Moran (0-6), R Bennis (1-0), M O'Brien (0-2), P O'Dwyer (0-1), E Kennedy (0-1), P Kirby (0-1).	Referee: P Moore (Waterford)

20 May 2001 Semi-final replay	Tipperary	4-07 – 0-10	Clare	Gaelic Grounds, Limerick
	T Ivors 1-1, H Maloney 1-0, F Devaney 1-0, D Kennedy (Clonoulty) 1-0, P Shortt 0-3, David Kennedy (Toomevara) 0-1, D Morrissey 0-1, M Farrell 0-1.		A Quinn 0-2, P Collins 0-2, M Madden 0-2, C Crows 0-1, G Ryan 0-1, C Maloney 0-1, G O'Grady 0-1.	Referee: D Richardson (Limerick)

Final

1 July 2001 Final	Cork	1-06 – 1-13	Tipperary	Páirc Uí Chaoimh, Cork
	K Murphy (0-6), M Coleman (1-0).	Report	P Shortt (0-9), F Devaney (1-0), D Kennedy (0-2), David Kennedy (0-1), J Caesar (0-1).	Referee: D Richardson (Limerick)

=== Ulster Minor Hurling Championship ===
Semi-final

1 July 2001 Semi-final	Derry	1-14 – 1-07	Down	Casement Park, Belfast
	C McKenna (0-1), D McGill (0-3, two frees), S McLaughlin (0-1), J Grant (0-1) P Bradley (0-1), HP Kelly (1-7, five frees).	Report	C Sloan (0-2), P Gilmore (0-3), D McCusker (0-1), F Murphy (0-1), E Clarke (1-0).

Final

15 July 2001 Final	Antrim	2-05 – 0-13	Derry	Casement Park, Belfast
	B Herron 0-1, ('65), K Stewart 1-3, (1f), G Clarke 1-1.	Report	D McGill 0-2, (2 frees), B Mullan 0-1, B McCartney 0-1, R Convery 0-2, HP Kelly 0-7, (6 frees).	Referee: T Mahon (Fermanagh)

=== All-Ireland Minor Hurling Championship ===
Quarter-finals

28 July 2001 Quarter-final	Cork	2-10 – 0-08	Wexford	Fraher Field, Dungarvan
	K Murphy (0-6), S Ó hAilpín (1-0), F Murphy (1-0), T O'Leary (0-2), D O'Riordan (0-1), B Smiddy (0-1).		D Mythen (0-2), R Jacob (0-2), E Murphy (0-2), M Cash (0-1), A Flynn (0-1).	Referee: T McIntyre (Antrim)

29 July 2001 Quarter-final	Galway	4-24 – 1-04	Derry	Croke Park, Dublin
	J Gantley (2-4), J Maher (1-6), A Cullanan (1-2), G Farragher (0-4 free and 65), K Hayes (0-3), K Burke (0-1), A Smith (0-1), K Huban (0-1), B Lucas (0-1), N Healy (0-1).	Report	HP Kelly (1-1), R Convery (0-1), P McCartney (0-1), D Magill (0-1).	Referee: D Kirwan (Cork)

Semi-finals

12 August 2001 Semi-final	Galway	3-13 – 1-07	Tipperary	Croke Park, Dublin
	K Burke (2-3), A Callanan (1-3), G Farragher (0-5, four frees and side-line cut), J Maher (0-1), A Smith (0-1).	Report	P Shortt (0-5, four frees), T Ivors (1-0), D Kennedy (0-1), D Morrissey (0-1).	Referee: J Sexton (Limerick)

19 August 2001 Semi-final	Cork	3-11 – 1-13	Kilkenny	Croke Park, Dublin
	K Murphy (Sarsfields) (3-6, fours points from frees), S Ó hAilpín (0-2), K Harnett (0-1), K Murphy (Erins Own) 0-1 free, J O'Connor (0-1).	Report	B Dowling (0-9, six frees), W O'Dwyer (1-1), PJ Delaney (0-2, 65 and free), M Phelan (0-1).	Referee: E Morris (Dublin)

Final

9 September 2001 Final	Cork	2-10 – 1-08	Galway	Croke Park, Dublin
	K Murphy (Sarsfields) (1-5, two frees), F Murphy (1-1), J O'Connor (0-2), J Gardiner (0-1 free), T O'Leary (0-1).	Report	G Farragher (1-6 side-line cut and three pointed frees), A Cullinane (0-2).	Referee: T McIntyre (Antrim)

== Championship statistics ==
=== Top scorers ===
Top scorers overall

Rank	Player	County	Tally	Total	Matches	Average
1	Kieran Murphy	Cork	5-38	53	6	8.83
2	Kevin Kelly	Offaly	6-09	27	3	9.00
3	Pat Shortt	Tipperary	0-24	24	5	4.80
4	David O'Callaghan	Dublin	2-17	23	3	7.66
5	Hugh Pat Kelly	Derry	2-15	21	3	7.00
6	Brian Carroll	Offaly	0-20	20	4	5.00
7	Ger Farragher	Galway	1-15	18	3	6.00
8	Setanta Ó hAilpín	Cork	3-07	16	6	2.66
8	Brian Dowling	Kilkenny	0-16	16	3	5.33
10	Rory Jacob	Wexford	3-06	15	3	5.00

Top scorers in a single game

Rank	Player	Club	Tally	Total	Opposition
1	Kieran Murphy	Cork	3-06	15	Kilkenny
2	Kevin Kelly	Offaly	3-05	14	Laois
2	Kieran Murphy	Cork	1-11	14	Limerick
4	Brian Ferns	Laois	3-01	10	Westmeath
4	Joe Gantley	Galway	2-04	10	Derry
4	Hugh Pat Kelly	Derry	1-07	10	Down
7	Kevin Kelly	Offaly	2-03	9	Westmeath
7	Rory Jacob	Wexford	2-03	9	Offaly
7	Kenneth Burke	Galway	2-03	9	Tipperary
7	Ger Farragher	Galway	1-06	9	Cork
7	Ger Farragher	Galway	1-06	9	Derry
7	David O'Callaghan	Dublin	0-09	9	Westmeath
7	Pat Shortt	Tipperary	0-09	9	Cork
7	Brian Dowling	Kilkenny	0-09	9	Cork
