= 2005 Cork Junior A Football Championship =

- Dates: 16 October – 27 November 2005
- Teams: 8
- Sponsor: Evening Echo
- Champions: Erin's Own (2nd title); Joe Lyons (captain); Diarmuid Cunningham (manager)
- Runners-up: O'Donovan Rossa

Tournament statistics
- Matches played: 8
- Goals scored: 9 (1.13 per match)
- Points scored: 138 (17.25 per match)

The 2005 Cork Junior A Football Championship was the 107th staging of the Cork Junior A Football Championship since its establishment by Cork County Board in 1895. The championship ran from 16 October to 27 November 2005.

The final was played on 27 November 2005 at Páirc Uí Rinn in Cork, between Erin's Own and O'Donovan Rossa, in what was their first ever meeting in the final. Erin's Own won the match by 1–12 to 1–11 to claim their second championship title overall and a first title in 11 years.

== Qualification ==
Division	Championship	Representatives
Avondhu	North Cork Junior A Football Championship	Ballyclough
Beara	Beara Junior A Football Championship	Adrigole
Carbery	South West Junior A Football Championship	O'Donovan Rossa
Carrigdhoun	South East Junior A Football Championship	Kinsale
Duhallow	Duhallow Junior A Football Championship	Dromtarriffe
Imokilly	East Cork Junior A Football Championship	Erin's Own
Muskerry	Mid Cork Junior A Football Championship	Béal Átha'n Ghaorthaidh
Seandún	City Junior A Football Championship	Na Piarsaigh

== Results ==
=== Quarter-finals ===
16 October 2005 Quarter-final	O'Donovan Rossa	1–11 – 1–06	Adrigole	Wolfe Tone Park
	D O'Regan 0–6, C Crowley 1–1, F McCarthy 0–1, J O'Driscoll 0–1, B Casey 0–1, N McCarthy 0–1.		K O'Sullivan-Greene 1–0, BJ O'Sullivan 0–2, K O'Neill 0–2, D Carey 0–1, F Carey 0–1.

22 October 2005 Quarter-final	Kinsale	0–08 – 0–08	Ballyclough	Páirc Uí Rinn
	C McCarthy 0–2, J Keohane 0–2, P Buckley 0–1, M Morris 0–1, M O'Leary 0–1, R O'Hanlin 0–1.		C O'Neill 0–3, S Smyth 0–2, T O'Connor 0–2, P O'Flynn 0–1.

29 October 2005 Quarter-final replay	Kinsale	1–06 – 0–06	Ballyclough	Páirc Uí Rinn
	C Quigley 1–1, J Keohane 0–1, K O'Regan 0–1, K Cahill 0–1, J Murphy 0–1, B Gray 0–1.		C O'Neill 0–3, P Flynn 0–2, T O'Connor 0–1.

6 November 2005 Quarter-final	Erin's Own	0–12 – 1–08	Dromtarriffe	Shanballymore Grounds
	F Murphy 0–7, M O'Connor 0–3, F Murphy 0–1, P Fitzgerald 0–1.		T Browne 1–1, G Murphy 0–3, P Dennehy 0–2, N O'Sullivan 0–1, D McCabe 0–1.

16 November 2005 Quarter-final	Béal Átha'n Ghaorthaidh	0–16 – 0–03	Na Piarsaigh	Páirc Uí Rinn
	L Shorten 0–5, A Concannon 0–4, P Concannon 0–3, P Buckley 0–1, C Lynch 0–1, L O'Connor 0–1, M Twomey 0–1.		M Twohig 0–2, D McDonald 0–1.

=== Semi-finals ===
13 November 2005 Semi-final	Erin's Own	1–09 – 0–07	Kinsale	Fr Con Buckley Park
	K Murphy Snr 1–0, S Murphy 0–3, C O'Leary 0–2, M O'Connor 0–2, E Murphy 0–1, F Murphy 0–1.		C O'Brien 0–5, K O'Regan 0–2.

20 November 2005 Semi-final	O'Donovan Rossa	1–07 – 1–06	Béal Átha'n Ghaorthaidh	St Mary's Park
	D O'Regan 0–4, F McCarthy 1–0, J O'Driscoll 0–1, N McCarthy 0–1, D O'Keeffe 0–1.		N Twomey 1–0, J O'Dricoll 0–1, P Buckley 0–1, S Twomey 0–1, P Concannon 0–1, A Concannon 0–1, L Shorten 0–1.

=== Final ===
27 November 2004 Final	Erin's Own	1–12 – 1–11	O'Donovan Rossa	Páirc Uí Rinn
	M Mulcahy 1–1, S Murphy 0–4, K Murphy Jnr 0–2, M O'Connor 0–2, K Murphy Snr 0–1, P Fenton 0–1, J Lyons 0–1.		D O'Keeffe 1–1, D O'Regan 0–3, C Crowley 0–2, N McCarthy 0–1, L Hazel 0–1, F McCarthy 0–1, N O'Driscoll 0–1, J O'Driscoll 0–1.	Referee: P O'Leary (Kilmurry)
