= 1987 Cork Intermediate Hurling Championship =

Irish hurling competition

- Dates: 6 June – 8 November 1987
- Teams: 23
- Champions: Erin's Own (2nd title); Alec Murphy (captain)
- Runners-up: Mallow; Peter Redmond (captain); Mossie Carroll (manager)

Tournament statistics
- Matches played: 23
- Goals scored: 84 (3.65 per match)
- Points scored: 478 (20.78 per match)
- Top scorer(s): Martin Fitzpatrick (1-22)

The 1987 Cork Intermediate Hurling Championship was the 78th staging of the Cork Intermediate Hurling Championship since its establishment by the Cork County Board in 1909. The draw for the opening round fixtures took place on 21 December 1986. The championship ran from 6 June to 8 November 1987.

On 8 November 1987, Erin's Own won the championship following a 1-06 to 0-08 defeat of Mallow in the final at Bride Rovers Park. This was their second championship title overall and their first title since 1984.

Ballymartle's Martin Fitzpatrick was the championship's top scorer with 1-22.

== Results ==
=== First round ===
| 6 June 1987 First round | Bandon | 2-12 - 3-07 | St. Finbarr's | Ballinhassig |
| | P Crowley 0-7, M Buckley 2-0, J O'Donovan 0-2, M Kelly 0-1, J Gabriel 0-1, P O'Donovan 0-1. | | J Collins 1-2, K Keating 1-1, P Ryan 1-0, M Kennedy 0-2, F O'Brien 0-1, J Tobin 0-1. |

| 7 June 1987 First round | Bishopstown | 2-08 - 3-12 | Passage | Ballinlough |
| | G McCarthy 1-5, T Keating 1-0, L Tuohy 0-2, N Crowley 0-1. | | J McCarthy 2-1, B Meade 1-4, J O'Sullivan 0-4, W Ashman 0-2, T O'Neill 0-1. |

| 7 June 1987 First round | Douglas | 4-13 - 0-05 | St. Vincent's | Ballinlough |
| | F Bermingham 2-0, P Lynch 1-2, E Forde 1-0, D Walsh 0-3, M O'Regan 0-2, P Daly 0-2, T Hurley 0-2, J Murphy 0-1, D O'Leary 0-1. | | J Gould 0-3, B Couttes 0-2. |

| 7 June 1987 First round | Éire Óg | 3-07 - 0-16 | St. Catherine's | Páirc Uí Chaoimh |
| | D O'Flynn 1-1, J Barry 1-0, (og), M O'Flynn 1-0, D Desmond 0-3, J O'Leary 0-1, M Kelleher 0-1, G Murphy 0-1. | | C Clancy 0-7, C Casey 0-3, M Kelleher 0-2, S O'Connell 0-1, C Curley 0-1, J Mangan 0-1, K Lane 0-1. |

| 7 June 1987 First round | Cobh | 4-07 - 1-15 | Inniscarra | Páirc Uí Chaoimh |
| | O O'Connell 2-3, P Devlin 2-1, G Morgan 0-1, M Meaney 0-1, B Frahill 0-1. | | G Manley 0-6, P O'Connell 0-4, S Griffin 1-0, P Maher 0-2, B O'Donoghue 0-1, M McDonnell 0-1, D Murphy 0-1. |

| 20 June 1987 First round | Erin's Own | 2-17 - 2-11 | Tracton | Church Road |
| | K Horgan 1-2, A Murphy 1-0, M Bowen 0-3, R O'Connor 0-3, F Horgan 0-3, G Bowen 0-2, PJ Murphy 0-2, T O'Keeffe 0-1, J Dillon 0-1. | | M Quinn 1-2, K Kingston 0-5, S Castleton 1-0, L Kelly 0-3, P O'Reilly 0-1. |

| 21 June 1987 First round | Ballymartle | 3-10 - 2-13 | Mayfield | Manning Park |
| | M Fitzpatrick 1-4, J Webb 1-0, B Coleman 1-0, K McCarthy 0-2, B Murphy 0-1, J Butler 0-1, E McCarthy 0-1, J O'Mahony 0-1. | | J Coomey 1-3, D Crowley 1-3, A Murphy 0-4, K Hyland 0-2, K Healy 0-1. |

| 3 July 1987 First round replay | Éire Óg | 1-13 - 1-11 | St. Catherine's | Páirc Uí Chaoimh |
| | D Desmond 0-8, J O'Leary 1-2, M Kelleher 0-2, G Murphy 0-1. | | C Clancy 0-6, C Casey 1-1, D Walsh 0-2, P O'Donoghue 0-2. |

=== Second round ===
| 7 June 1987 Second round | Youghal | 2-11 - 2-09 | Newcestown | Riverstown Sportsfield |
| | T Coyne 0-7, T O'Connell 1-1, S Ring 1-0, M Coyne 0-1, V O'Shea 0-1, P Grace 0-1. | | T Crowley 1-4, M O'Mahony 1-3, M Crowley 0-1, C O'Sullivan 0-1. |

| 13 June 1987 Second round | Blackrock | 2-16 - 0-10 | Nemo Rangers | Páirc Uí Chaoimh |
| | R Hegarty 1-1, T Aherne 1-1, T Lyons 0-3, N Cahalane 0-2, M Lyons 0-2, P Moylan 0-2, P Fitzgerald 0-2, M Harrington 0-2, P O'Brien 0-1. | | F Golden 0-6, N Maxwell 0-2, A Horgan 0-1, D Lehane 0-1. |

| 21 June 1987 Second round | Ballinhassig | 2-10 - 2-07 | Kilbrittain | Jack Barrett Park |
| | S McCarthy 0-5, D McCarthy 1-1, C Cottrell 1-0, D Brosnan 0-2, P Desmond 0-1, K Cullinane 0-1. | | D O'Connell 1-3, P Brennan 1-1, C O'Connell 0-1, G O'Sullivan 0-1, D O'Neill 0-1. |

| 26 June 1987 Second round | Midleton | 3-05 - 4-08 | Mallow | Bride Rovers Park |
| | D Quirke 1-4, P O'Brien 1-0, C O'Neill 1-0, G Glavin 0-1. | | D Murphy 2-3, J Hayes 2-1, P Buckley 0-3, C Mannix 0-1. |

| 5 July 1987 Second round | Cobh | 2-10 - 3-16 | Erin's Own | Carrigtwohill |
| | O O'Connell 2-1, G Morgan 0-5, P Devlin 0-3, P Tallon 0-1. | | J Dillon 1-3, F Horgan 1-1, A Murphy 1-0, R O'Connor 0-3, J Corcoran 0-3, PJ Murphy 0-2, K Horgan 0-2, M Bowen 0-1, D Ahern 0-1. |

| 30 July 1987 Second round | Éire Óg | 2-11 - 1-08 | Passage | Páirc Liam Mhic Cárthaigh |
| | | | | Referee: M Flaherty (Blackrock) |

| 15 August 1987 Second round | Bandon | 2-10 - 2-08 | Newtownshandrum | Coachford Sportsfield |
| | P Crowley 0-7, M Kelly 1-1, J O'Donovan 1-1, R Wilmot 0-1. | | D Coughlan 0-5, PJ Greensmith 1-1, D O'Riordan 1-0, J Geary 0-2. |

| 22 August 1987 Second round | Douglas | 1-05 - 0-13 | Ballymartle | Carrigaline |
| | E Forde 1-0, M O'Regan 0-2, P Daly 0-1, P Lynch 0-1, F Birmingham 0-1. | | M Fitzpatrick 0-8, J O'Mahony 0-3, J Webb 0-1, G McCarthy 0-1. |

=== Quarter-finals ===
| 1 August 1987 Quarter-final | Youghal | 2-16 - 1-13 | Ballinhassig | Erin's Own Grounds |
| | T Coyne 1-8, M Butler 1-1, S Gardiner 0-1, S Ring 0-1, F O'Sullivan 0-1, M Walsh 0-1, P Grace 0-1, R Swayne 0-1, M Swayne 0-1. | | S McCarthy 1-7, D McCarthy 0-3, P Desmond 0-1, D McCarthy 0-1, P Cussen 0-1. |

| 22 August 1987 Quarter-final | Erin's Own | 2-19 - 1-09 | Éire Óg | Church Road |
| | F Horgan 1-4, R O'Connor 0-7, J Dillon 1-3, G Bowen 0-3, J Corcoran 0-1, M Bowen 0-1. | | D Desmond 0-6, D Flynn 1-0, M Kelleher 0-1, J O'Leary 0-1, P Flynn 0-1. |

| 29 August 1987 Quarter-final | Ballymartle | 3-10 - 3-05 | Bandon | Innishannon Sportsfield |
| | K McCarthy 3-2, M Fitzpatrick 0-5, J Webb 0-1, K O'Donovan 0-1, M Allen 0-1. | | P Crowley 3-1, J Gabriel 0-2, J O'Donovan 0-1, S Ryan 0-1. |

| 27 September 1987 Quarter-final | Mallow | 3-09 - 1-10 | Blackrock | Castlelyons |
| | P Buckley 2-1, R Sheehan 0-5, J Hayes 1-0, R Glynn 0-2, C Mannix 0-1. | | P Moylan 0-7, N Cahalane 1-0, T Lyons 0-1, M Lyons 0-1, P O'Neill 0-1. |

=== Semi-finals ===
| 13 September 1987 Semi-final | Erin's Own | 2-11 - 1-09 | Ballymartle | Páirc Uí Chaoimh |
| | K Horgan 1-2, J Bowen 1-0, R O'Connor 0-3, PJ Murphy 0-2, J Dillon 0-1, F Horgan 0-1, A Murphy 0-1, M Bowen 0-1. | | M Fitzpatrick 0-5, M Allen 1-0, K Donovan 0-2, K McCarthy 0-1, T Allen 0-1. |

| 25 October 1987 Semi-final | Mallow | 1-11 - 0-08 | Youghal | Páirc Uí Chaoimh |
| | R Glynn 1-1, C Mannix 0-3, P Buckley 0-2, R Sheehan 0-2, D Murphy 0-2, P Shine 0-1. | | T Coyne 0-4, M Coyne 0-2, S Gardiner 0-1, S Ring 0-1. |

=== Final ===
| 8 November 1987 Final | Erin's Own | 1-06 - 0-08 | Mallow | Bride Rovers Park |
| | M Bowen 1-0, J Corcoran 0-3, R O'Connor 0-3. | | R Sheehan 0-6, R Glynn 0-1, J Hayes 0-1. |

== Championship statistics ==
=== Top scorers ===
Overall

| Rank | Player | Club | Tally | Total | Matches | Average |
|---|---|---|---|---|---|---|
| 1 | Martin Fitzpatrick | Ballymartle | 1-22 | 25 | 4 | 6.25 |
| 2 | Pádraig Crowley | Bandon | 3-15 | 24 | 3 | 8.00 |
| 3 | Tony Coyne | Youghal | 1-19 | 22 | 3 | 7.33 |

In a single game

| Rank | Player | Club | Tally | Total | Opposition |
|---|---|---|---|---|---|
| 1 | Kevin McCarthy | Ballymartle | 3-02 | 11 | Bandon |
| 1 | Tony Coyne | Youghal | 1-08 | 11 | Ballinhassig |
| 3 | Pádraig Crowley | Bandon | 3-01 | 10 | Ballymartle |
| 3 | Seánie McCarthy | Ballinhassig | 1-07 | 10 | Youghal |
| 5 | Owen O'Connell | Cobh | 2-03 | 9 | Inniscarra |
| 5 | Donal Murphy | Mallow | 2-03 | 9 | Midleton |
| 7 | Gabriel McCarthy | Bishopstown | 1-05 | 8 | Passage |
| 7 | Denis Desmond | Éire Óg | 0-08 | 8 | St. Catherine's |
| 7 | Martin Fitzpatrick | Ballymartle | 0-08 | 8 | Douglas |
