= The Abbey School (Tipperary) =

- Scoil na Mainistreach, Tiobraid Árainn
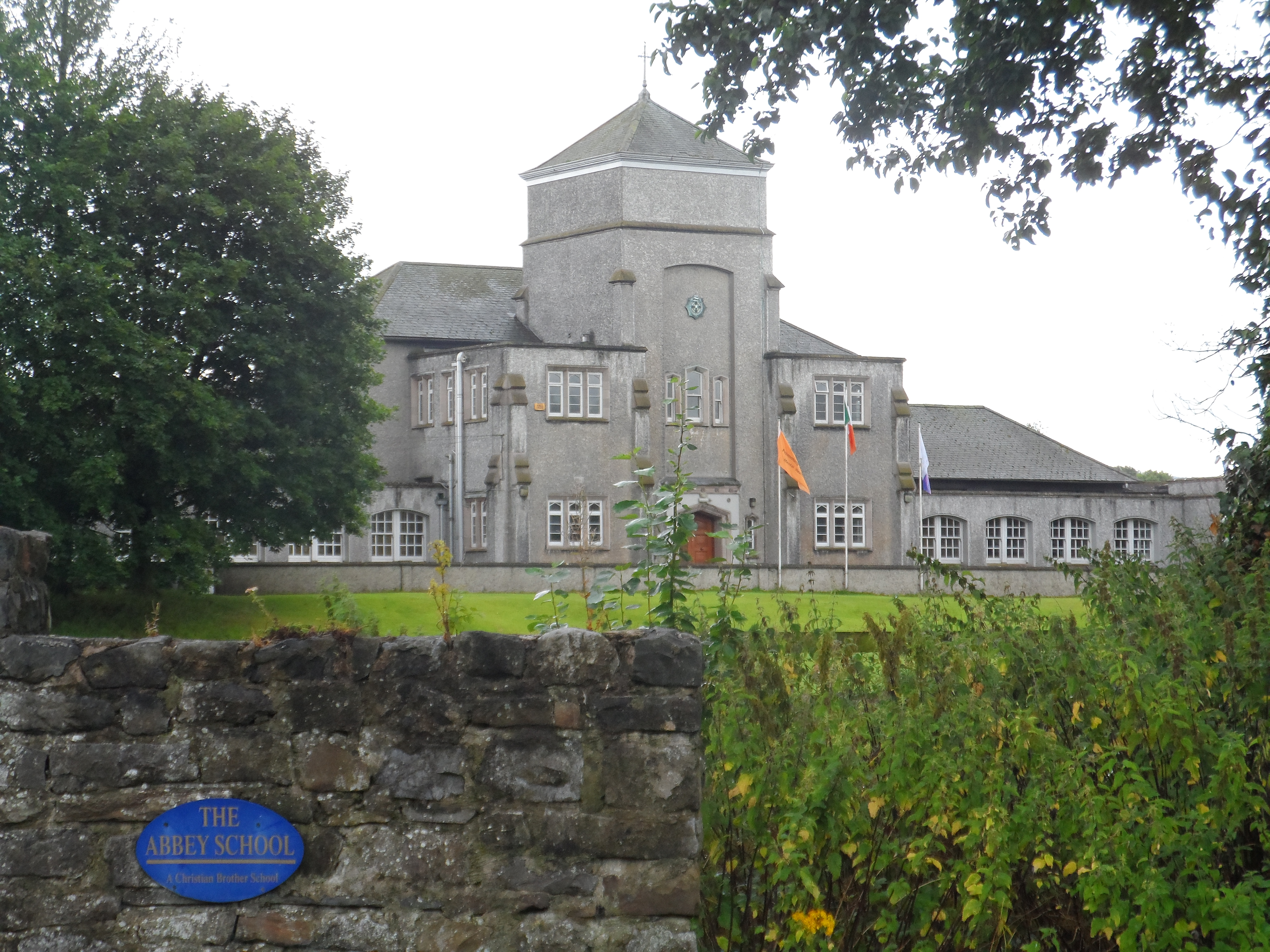

Location
- Station Road, Tipperary, County Tipperary; E34 PD87; Ireland; 52.471583°N 8.160133°W

Information
- Motto: A Caring, Learning Community
- Religious affiliation: Christian Brothers
- Denomination: Roman Catholic
- Established: 3 October 1955 (as Father Humphrey's Memorial School)
- Principal: David Sadlier
- Gender: Male
- Enrollment: 332
- Campus size: 9 ha (23 ac)
- Campus type: Urban
- Website: abbeyschool.ie

The Abbey School (formerly Abbey CBS) is a Christian Brothers Secondary School in the town of Tipperary, County Tipperary, Ireland. The Abbey is an all-boys school which, as of 2024, had over 320 students.

In recent years, the school has been extended twice. The first extension is known as the "Edmund Rice Wing" and contains a construction studies room, woodwork room and technology laboratory. The second extension was the complete renovation of an old stable which is now called the "Mary Rice Centre" which houses a special needs area, learning support and one-to-one education and a library.

As of 2024, the principal of the school was David Sadlier.

== History ==
A priory of Augustinian friars operated on the site from c. 1300 before being suppressed in 1539.

After the Cromwellian conquest (1650s) the land came to Erasmus Smith. He established grammar schools in Tipperary, Galway and Drogheda, where the sons of his Protestant tenants were educated.

The first building was destroyed during the Williamite War (1688–91). By 1702, there was a new grammar school, which lasted until 1820 when it was rebuilt.

The structure that succeeded it burned down in 1941, soon after the Catholic Christian Brothers had assumed control.

On 3 October 1955 the school was reopened as Father Humphrey's Memorial School. The school is named after Fr. David Humphr[e]ys (1843–1930) who had campaigned for the education rights of Catholics.

== Notable alumni ==
- Nicholas Mansergh (1910–91)
- Nicky English (born 1962), hurler, manager and broadcaster
- Standish James O'Grady (1846–1928), writer
- John O'Leary (1830–1907), Fenian
- Goddard Henry Orpen (1852–1932), historian
- Michael Slattery (1783–1857), Catholic archbishop
- Alan Quinlan (born 1974), rugby player and broadcaster
