= Kieran Murphy (Sarsfields hurler) =

Irish hurler (born 1983)

Personal information
- Native name: Ciarán Ó Murchú (Irish)
- Nickname: Fraggy
- Born: 22 February 1983 (age 43) Glanmire, County Cork, Ireland
- Occupation: Quantity surveyor
- Height: 5 ft 10 in (178 cm)

Sport
- Sport: Hurling
- Position: Forward
Club
Years	Club	Apps (scores)
1999-2015	Sarsfields	75 (13-78)
Club titles
- Cork titles: 4
College
- Years: College
- Limerick IT
College titles
- Fitzgibbon titles: 2
Inter-county
Years	County	Apps (scores)
2003–2011	Cork	29 (5–20)
Inter-county titles
- Munster titles: 3
- All-Irelands: 2
- NHL: 0
- All Stars: 0

Kieran Murphy (born 22 February 1983 in Glanmire, County Cork) is an Irish former sportsperson. He played hurling with his local club Sarsfields and was a member of the Cork senior inter-county team from 2003 until 2011. Murphy was appointed captain of the team for 2010. Murphy announced his retirement from inter-county hurling in 2011 due to work commitments outside the Cork area.

== Playing career ==
=== Sarsfields ===
Murphy plays his club hurling with his local club called Sarsfield's and has enjoyed much success. He first came to prominence as the club enjoyed an under-age boom in the early years of the new century. After experiencing little success at minor level, Murphy was a key member of the 'Sars' under-21 team that reached the final of the county under-21 championship in 2003. Valley Rovers provided the opposition on that occasion, however, they proved no match for Murphy's side. A 3–11 to 0–12 score line gave victory to Sarsfield's and gave Murphy a county under-21 winners' medal.

By this stage Murphy was also a member of the Sarsfield's senior hurling team. In 2008 the club reached the county final of the senior championship, with Murphy serving as captain. A narrow 2–14 to 2–13 victory over Bride Rovers gave Murphy a county senior championship winners' medal and gave 'Sars' a first county final win since 1957.

=== Cork ===
==== Minor and under-21 ====
Murphy first came to prominence on the inter-county scene as a member of the Cork minor hurling team when he was just sixteen years-old in 1999. He enjoyed little success in his debut season, however, in 2000 Cork reached the provincial minor decider. Limerick provided the opposition on that occasion, however, they were no match for 'the Rebels'. A 2–19 to 1–10 trouncing gave Cork the victory and gave Murphy a Munster winners' medal. The subsequent All-Ireland final saw Cork take on Galway. A high-scoring encounter saw 'the Tribesmen' take the title by 2–19 to 4–10.

In 2001 Murphy was in his third and final season as a member of the Cork minor hurling team. They surrendered their Munster title to Tipperary following a conclusive 1–13 to 1–6 defeat. Cork, however, still had a chance to claim the All-Ireland title via the 'back door'. Murphy gave one of his best-ever displays in the All-Ireland semi-final against Kilkenny when he scored 3–6. After coming through the All-Ireland series Cork reached the All-Ireland championship decider. For the second year in succession Galway were the opponents. Murphy scored 1–5 in that game, as Cork went on to win by 2–10 to 1–8. It was his first All-Ireland minor winners' medal.

Murphy subsequently joined the Cork under-21 team, however, he enjoyed little success in this grade. He lost back-to-back Munster deciders to Tipperary in 2003 and 2004, with Murphy serving as captain in the former year.

==== Senior ====
Murphy's performances at under-age levels brought him to the attentions of the Cork selectors at senior level. He made his senior championship debut in 2003, a year which saw Cork's players emerge from a bitter stand-off with the county board, however, he played no part in the county's Munster final victory and subsequent All-Ireland final defeat.

2004 saw Cork reach the Munster final once again and, for the second consecutive year, Waterford provided the opposition. In what many consider to be the greatest provincial decider of them all, both sides fought tooth-and-nail for the full seventy minutes. Unfortunately for Murphy, Cork lost the game by just a single point on a score line of Waterford 3–16, Cork 1–21. Although Cork surrendered their provincial crown they were still in with a chance of landing the All-Ireland title. After manoeuvring through the qualifiers Cork reached a second consecutive All-Ireland final and, once again, Kilkenny provided the opposition. The game was expected to be another classic; however, a damp day put an end to this. While the first half was a low-scoring affair, the second-half saw Cork completely take over. For the last twenty-three minutes Cork scored nine unanswered points and went on to win the game by 0–17 to 0–9 with Murphy knocking over two vital scores en route to victory. It was Murphy's first All-Ireland winners' medal.

In 2005 Cork were on form again and the team won back the provincial crown that year with a 1–12 to 1–16 victory over Tipperary. It was Murphy's first Munster winners' medal as Cork went on the march for glory once again. In the All-Ireland semi-final against Clare their championship campaign was nearly derailed when they fell behind by seven points at the start of the second-half. A huge performance by Cork turned this deficit around and Cork went on to win the game by 0–16 to 0–15. While it was expected that Cork and Kilkenny would do battle again in a third consecutive All-Ireland final Galway were the surprise winners of the second semi-final. It was the first meeting of Cork and Galway in an All-Ireland final since 1990 and even more daunting was that men from the west had never beaten Cork in a championship decider. Once again neither side broke away into a considerable lead, however, at the final whistle Cork were ahead by 1–21 to 1–16. For the second year in-a-row Cork were the All-Ireland champions and Murphy collected his second winners' medal.

2006 saw Cork turn their attentions to a first three-in-a-row of All-Ireland titles since 1978. The team's championship campaign got off to a good start with a 0–20 to 0–14 defeat of Clare in the opening round of the Munster championship. The subsequent provincial decider saw Cork take on Tipp for the second consecutive year. Star forward Joe Deane was to the fore, scoring an impressive eight points and contributing greatly to Cork's 2–11 to 1–11 victory over their old rivals. It was Murphy's second consecutive Munster winners' medal. Subsequent victories over Limerick and Waterford saw Cork qualify for their fourth consecutive All-Ireland final and for the third time Kilkenny were the opponents. Like previous encounters neither side took a considerable lead, however, Kilkenny had a vital goal from Aidan Fogarty. Cork were in arrears coming into the final few minutes, however, Ben O'Connor goaled for Cork. It was too little too late as 'the Cats' denied 'the Rebels' the three-in-a-row on a score line of 1–16 to 1–13.

In 2007 Cork were out foe redemption, however, their championship ambitions were hampered from the beginning. The so-called Semplegate affair resulted in Seán Óg Ó hAilpín, Donal Óg Cusack and Diarmuid O'Sullivan being suspended for a crucial Munster semi-final clash with Waterford. In spite of being without three of their best players Cork put up a good fight but only lost by a goal. After manoeuvring through the qualifiers Cork reached the All-Ireland quarter-final. Once again Waterford provided the opposition as the game controversially ended in a draw – 3–16 apiece. The replay was less exciting; however, it was still a good game as Waterford triumphed by 2–17 to 0–20.

The activities of the Cork footballers and their reaction to the appointment of Teddy Holland as their new manager impacted greatly on the preparations of the Cork hurling team. The entire panel went on a sympathy strike and missed the opening games of the National League. In the end the Cork hurlers returned to duty, however, their first championship game resulted in a defeat by Tipperary and 'the Rebels' had to take their chances in the win-or-bust qualifiers. A goal by Joe Deane in their next outing helped Cork to limp over the finish line against Dublin. The team's overall performance was less than impressive in the 1–17 to 0–15 win. Cork's next game saw Galway, a team regarded as one of the best in the country, provide the opposition. The first half was a poor affair with Cork's goalkeeper, Donal Óg Cusack, being sent off. In the second-half Cork took charge and secured a 0–23 to 2–15 victory and a place in the All-Ireland quarter-final. Clare were the opposition on that occasion and, once again, Cork gave a poor first-half display. The second half was a different story with Cork taking charge once again and securing a 2–19 to 2–17 victory. This win allowed Cork to advance to the All-Ireland semi-final where Kilkenny provided the opposition. It was the first time that these two teams met in the championship outside of an All-Ireland final. That game was an intriguing encounter; however, 'the Cats' won the day by 1–23 to 0–17.

Following the defeat by Kilkenny in 2008 manager Gerald McCarthy's two-year contract came to an end. He was later re-appointed for a further two-year term by the Cork County Board, in spite of the majority of the players not wanting him to stay on. The players on the 2008 panel, with Murphy playing a low-key role in the strike, refused to play or train under McCarthy. (see 2008-2009 Cork players strike). McCarthy accordingly began the 2009 National League campaign with a new squad, none of whom had been able to make the previous year's panel. After months of pressure McCarthy eventually stepped down as manager.

Following the resolution to these difficulties Cork were defeated by Tipperary on a score line of 1–19 to 0–19 in the opening round of the Munster campaign. After a convincing win over Offaly the next assignment for Murphy's Cork team was a win-or-bust All-Ireland qualifier meeting with Galway. Cork faltered in the final ten minutes as 'the Tribesmen' knocked 'the Rebels' out of the championship by 1–19 to 0–15.

In 2010 Murphy succeeded John Gardiner as captain of the Cork senior hurling team. Murphy announced his retirement from inter-county hurling in 2011 due to work commitments outside the Cork area.

=== Munster ===
Murphy has also lined out with Munster in the Railway Cup inter-provincial competition. He played with the province for the first time in 2004, however, Munster were defeated in the final by Connacht with a 1–15 to 0–9 score line. 2005 saw Murphy line out in a second Railway Cup final. Leinster provided the opposition on that occasion, however, victory went to Munster by 1–21 to 2–14, giving Murphy a Railway Cup winners' medal.

== Coaching career ==
=== Cork ===
==== Under-21 ====
On 17 October 2016, Murphy was ratified as a selector under John Meyler with the Cork under-21 team. On 13 July 2017, Cork began their Munster Championship campaign with a last-minute 2–17 to 1-19 semi-final defeat of Waterford. On 26 July, Cork faced Limerick in the Munster final. The game ended in a 0–16 to 1–11 defeat for Murphy's side.

==== Senior ====
===== 2018 season =====
On 14 November 2017, Murphy was ratified as a selector with the Cork senior team following John Meyler's earlier appointment as manager. His first match as part of the management team was a 2–23 to 1–21 loss to Limerick in the pre-season Munster League. Cork later went undefeated in the new Munster Championship round robin. Murphy's side won their second successive Munster final, where they defeated Clare on 1 July 2018 to win the title by 2–24 to 1–19.

== Career statistics ==
=== Club ===
Team	Season	Cork		Munster		All-Ireland		Total	
Team	Season	Apps	Score	Apps	Score	Apps	Score	Apps	Score
Sarsfields	1999-00	1	0-00	—		—		1	0-00
Sarsfields	2000-01	2	1-05	—		—		2	1-05
Sarsfields	2001-02	4	0-05	—		—		4	0-05
Sarsfields	2002-03	5	1-15	—		—		5	1-15
Sarsfields	2003-04	5	0-07	—		—		5	0-07
Sarsfields	2004-05	2	0-04	—		—		2	0-04
Sarsfields	2005-06	2	0-04	—		—		2	0-04
Sarsfields	2006-07	5	0-02	—		—		5	0-02
Sarsfields	2007-08	2	0-04	—		—		2	0-04
Sarsfields	2008-09	5	1-07	2	0-03	—		7	1-10
Sarsfields	2009-10	5	1-02	—		—		5	1-02
Sarsfields	2010-11	6	0-08	1	1-01	—		7	1-09
Sarsfields	2011-12	3	0-01	—		—		3	0-01
Sarsfields	2012-13	5	3-02	1	0-00	—		6	3-02
Sarsfields	2013-14	5	2-05	—		—		5	2-05
Sarsfields	2014-15	6	2-01	1	1-00	—		7	3-01
Sarsfields	2015-16	7	0-02	—		—		7	0-02
Total		70	11-74	5	2-04	—		75	13-78

=== Inter-county ===
Team	Year	National League			Munster		All-Ireland		Total	
Team	Year	Division	Apps	Score	Apps	Score	Apps	Score	Apps	Score
Cork	2003	Division 1B	x	x-xx	0	0-00	0	0-00	x	x-xx
Cork	2004	Division 1B	x	x-xx	1	0-00	4	0-06	x	x-xx
Cork	2005	Division 1B	x	x-xx	2	1-03	3	0-02	x	x-xx
Cork	2006	Division 1A	x	x-xx	2	0-01	3	0-00	x	x-xx
Cork	2007	Division 1A	x	x-xx	2	2-02	5	3-05	x	x-xx
Cork	2008	Division 1A	x	x-xx	1	0-00	2	1-00	x	x-xx
Cork	2009	Division 1	3	0-02	1	0-00	2	0-02	6	0-04
Cork	2010	Division 1	7	1-09	4	0-02	2	0-04	13	1-15
Cork	2011	Division 1	4	0-01	1	0-00	0	0-00	5	0-01
Total			x	x-xx	14	3-08	21	4-19	x	x-xx

== Honours ==
=== Sarsfield's ===
- Cork Senior Hurling Championship:
  - Winner (4): 2008, 2010, 2012, 2014
  - Runner-up (2): 2009, 2013
- Cork Under-21 Hurling Championship:
  - Winner (1): 2003

=== LIT ===
- Fitzgibbon Cup:
  - Winner (2): 2005, 2007 (C)

=== Cork ===
- All-Ireland Senior Hurling Championship:
  - Winner (2): 2004, 2005
  - Runner-up (2): 2003 (sub), 2006
- Munster Senior Hurling Championship:
  - Winner (3): 2003 (sub), 2005, 2006
  - Runner-up (2): 2004, 2010 (c)
- Munster Under-21 Hurling Championship:
  - Winner (0):
  - Runner-up (2): 2003 (C), 2004
- All-Ireland Minor Hurling Championship:
  - Winner (1): 2001
  - Runner-up (1): 2000 (sub)
- All-Ireland Minor Hurling Championship:
  - Winner (1): 2001
  - Runner-up (1): 2000
- Munster Minor Hurling Championship:
  - Winner (1): 2000
  - Runner-up (1): 2001

=== Munster ===
- Railway Cup:
  - Winner (1): 2005
  - Runner-up (1): 2004

Sporting positions
Preceded by John Gardiner	Cork senior hurling team captain 2010	Succeeded by Shane O'Neill
Preceded by Paudie Murray	Cork minor hurling team manager 2022-	Succeeded by Incumbent
