= Coláiste an Phiarsaigh =

Secondary school in Cork, Ireland

Coordinates: 51.917985°N 8.398409°W

Coláiste an Phiarsaigh is a coeducational voluntary secondary school in Glanmire, Cork. Irish is the language of instruction and all pupils and teachers are expected to converse in Irish. The school is free for day pupils and fee-paying for boarders, though some bursaries are available.

Gaedhealachas Teoranta established the school in 1973. it is named after Patrick Pearse, an Irish revolutionary and Gaelic revivalist. Cormac Mac Cárthaigh was one of the founders, and Eibhlín Ní Drisceoil was principal from 1973 to 1991. In 1978, with about 200 students enrolled, the first permanent building was opened. In the 1980s, when student numbers increased, prefabs were opened. A permanent extension building opened in 1995, with a science lab, computer room, art room, classrooms, staff room and offices. In the 2022–23 school year, the school had approximately 580 students and there were 60 staff members. Irish-language courses for children 10–14 are held in the school during the summer holidays.

In The Sunday Times 2013 ranking of progression to third-level education, the school ranked 5th in Cork city and county, and 22nd in the state.

On 12 May 2023, Coláiste an Phiarsaigh received a €25 million funding allocation, of which money will go towards new construction on the Cork campus, creating space for the school to offer additional facilities to students. The list of new amenities includes 15 new classrooms, 3 laboratories and a new sports hall. The grant will also provide more specialised facilities such as an autism unit, a home economics room, a school library, a staff room and even an on-campus restaurant.

== Notable alumni ==
- Barry Coffey
- Kieran Murphy
