= 2026 All-Ireland Minor Hurling Championship =

2026 hurling competition for male players under the age of 17

All-Ireland Minor Hurling Championship 2026
Championship Details
- Dates: 21 March - 27 June 2026
- Teams: 18

All Ireland Champions
- Winners: Limerick (4th win)
- Captain: Shane Waters
- Manager: Diarmuid Mullins

All Ireland Runners-up
- Runners-up: Tipperary
- Captain: Conor Collins
- Manager: James Woodlock

Provincial Champions
- Munster: Tipperary
- Leinster: Galway
- Ulster: Antrim
- Connacht: Not Played

Championship Statistics
- Top Scorer: Joe Dowling (7-56)

The 2026 All-Ireland Minor Hurling Championship was the 96th staging of the All-Ireland Minor Hurling Championship since its establishment by the Gaelic Athletic Association in 1928. The championship ran from 21 March to 27 June 2026.

Waterford were the defending champions, however, they were eliminated from the competition after winning only one game in the group stage.

The All-Ireland final was played on 27 June 2026 at TUS Gaelic Grounds in Limerick, between Limerick and Tipperary, in what was their first ever meeting in the final. Limerick won the match by 2–12 to 1–14 to claim their fourth championship title overall and a first tile in 42 years.

== Leinster Minor Hurling Championship ==
=== Leinster Phase 1 ===
==== Leinster Phase 1 Round 1 ====
21 March 2026 Round 1	Antrim	5-20 - 0-15	Wicklow	P&P Louth GAA Training Centre
		Report	C Lawrence 0-9, J Keeshan 0-3, J Dempsey 0-1, J O'Brien 0-1, C O'Toole 0-1.

21 March 2026 Round 1	Laois	1-19 - 0-15	Kerry	Laois Hire O'Moore Park
	B O'Connor 1-3, O Gilligan (0-1 free) and T Lowry 0-4 each, C Jones 0-3, C Hoey and L Hynes 0-2 each, R Standish 0-1.	Report	S Ross O'Gorman 0-9 (0-7 frees, 0-1 65'), B Moriarty 0-2, D Cullinan, M O'Flaherty, B O'Connor and T Scanlon 0-1 each.

21 March 2026 Round 1	Meath	2-15 - 0-18	Kildare	St Loman's Park
	B Healy 2-8, K McKeigue 0-3, C Flynn 0-2, A Cole 0-1, D Wright 0-1.	Report	C Óg MacAogáin 0-9, O Mcafee 0-2, E Lyons 0-2, A Conway 0-1, S Higgins 0-1, M Reilly 0-1.

22 March 2026 Round 1	Carlow	0-08 - 5-26	Offaly	Netwatch Cullen Park
	D O'Neill (0-5, 0-4 frees), F Donnelly, L Murphy, E Treacy (0-1 each).	Report	E Carty (1-4), J Collins (0-7, 0-5 frees), L Mulhare (1-3), J Furey (1-2), K O'Rourke (0-4), K Coughlan (1-1), S Devery (1-0), J Kirwan, P Duffy (0-2 each), J Dooley (0-1).

==== Leinster Phase 1 Round 2 ====
28 March 2026 Round 2	Carlow	0-09 - 2-15	Kerry	Newtwatch COE Fenagh
	D O'Neill 0-4, A Doyle 0-2, F Donnelly 0-1, J Flood 0-1, A Joyce 0-1.	Report	S Shanahan 1-7, S Ross O'Gorman 0-5, D Cullinan 0-1, T Diggins 0-1, B O'Connor 0-1.

28 March 2026 Round 2	Wicklow	1-09 - 1-17	Kildare	Echelon Park
	J Keeshan 0-7, C Lawrence 1-0, J O'Brien 0-2.	Report	C Óg Mac Aogáin 0-12, O McAfee 1-1, E Lyons 0-2, S Higgins 0-1.

==== Leinster Phase 1 Round 3 ====
4 April 2026 Round 3	Kildare	0-08 (8) – (13) 1-10	Laois	Hawkfield
16:15				Venue: Manguard Park
	Pts: C Óg Mac Aogain 0-4 (4 frees), E Lyons 0-2, O McAffee 0-2 (1 free).	Report	Pts: LJ Cuddy 0-6 (4 frees), C Hoey 1-1, O Gilligan 0-1, B O'Connor 0-1, C Hoey 0-1.

4 April 2026 Round 3	Westmeath	3-26 (35) – (16) 2-10	Kerry	Raharney
16:00				Venue: Joristown Park
	Pts: C Raleigh 0-10 (3f), D Geary 2-1, MJ Long 1-2, T Shaw and E Beehan 0-3 each, C Williams and A Doyle 0-2 each, D Kelly, D Gaffney and T Wrafter 0-1 each.	Report	Pts: S Ross O’Gorman 1-4 (0-2f, 0-1 ‘65’), T Scanlon 1-0, J Gaynor 0-2, D Cullinan, R Carey, S Harty and P Cronin 0-1 each.

4 April 2026 Round 3	Meath	1-10 (13) – (50) 10-20	Antrim	Trim
14:00
	Pts: B Healy 1-4, K McKeigue 0-4, B Kelly 0-1, D Wright 0-1.	Report	Pts: L Rafferty 3-0, C McNaughton 2-3, C Dempsey 2-1, O McClaren 0-6, E McGuckian 1-0, L Mcconville 1-0, C McCaughan 1-0, J Gault 0-3, M Murray 0-3, C McCann 0-2, N McKenna 0-1, J McGarry 0-1.

==== Leinster Phase 1 Round 4 ====
11 April 2026 Round 4	Laois	2-17 (23) – (21) 1-18	Antrim	Portlaoise
13:30				Venue: Laois Hire O'Moore Park
	Pts: LJ Cuddy 1-10 (0-7fs, 0-1 65), O Gilligan 1-0, L Hynes and C Jones 0-2 each, K James, B O’Connor, and J O’Connell 0-1 each.	Report	Pts: O McLaren 0-11 (0-10fs), J Gault 1-0, C McNaughton 0-2, E McGuikan, E Curry, J McGarry, L McConville, and J Ferguson 0-1 each.

11 April 2026 Round 4	Offaly	2-14 (20) – (27) 3-18	Westmeath	Birr
14:00				Venue: St Brendan's Park
	Pts: J Furey 1-4, A Screeney 0-4 (3f and 1 '65'), J Collins 1-1 (penalty and free), K O'Rourke 0-2, J Dooley, P Duffy and L Mulhare 0-1 each.	Report	Pts: C Raleigh 0-6 (2f and one sideline), E Beehan 2-0, A Doyle 1-1, C Williams 0-3 (2f and 1 '65'), E Goldrick, D Kelly, MJ Long and D Geary 0-2 each.

=== Leinster Phase 2 ===
==== Leinster Phase 2 Group 1 ====
Advance to Leinster Semi-Finals

Team	Matches				Score			Pts
Team	Pld	W	D	L	For	Against	Diff	Pts
Dublin	3	1	1	1	59	63	-4	3
Kilkenny	3	1	0	2	70	58	+12	2
Laois	3	0	0	3	48	93	-45	0

==== Leinster Phase 2 Group 2 ====
Advance to Leinster Semi-Finals

Team	Matches				Score			Pts
Team	Pld	W	D	L	For	Against	Diff	Pts
Galway	3	2	1	0	72	66	+6	5
Wexford	3	2	0	1	80	53	+27	4
Westmeath	3	2	0	1	62	58	+4	4

==== Leinster Phase 2 Group Matches ====
Round 1

18 April 2026 Round 1	Westmeath	0-14 (14) – (30) 4-18	Kilkenny	Clonkill
	Pts: C Williams 0-4 (3f, 1 65) C Raleigh 0-3 (2f), MJ Long 0-2, A Doyle 0-2, C Raleigh 0-1 (1f), C Cleary 0-1, E Behan 0-1.	Report	Pts: J Dowling 2-9 (8f, 1 pen), R Power 1-5, J Bolger 1-0, R Lacey; 0-1, B Walsh 0-1, R Phelan 0-1, P Meany 0-1

18 April 2026 Round 1	Dublin	2-14 (20) – (17) 1-14	Wexford	Dublin
				Venue: Parnell Park
	Pts: R Hession 1-8 (1-0pen, 0-8f); J Davy 1-0; E Forde, F Reville, P Batten, C Nevin, M Dempsey, D Stynes (f) 0-1 apiece.	Report	Pts: J Tobin 1-6 (0-3f, 0-1 ’65); C Whelan 0-2; R Durack, R Kehoe, J Furlong, C Doyle, B Murray, E Kehoe 0-1 apiece.

18 April 2026 Round 1	Laois	1-19 (22) – (26) 1-23	Galway	Portlaoise
				Venue: Laois Hire O'Moore Park
	Pts: LJ Cuddy 0-13 (0-12fs), C Jones 1-0, L Hynes 0-3, B O'Connor, T Hughes and K James 0-1 each	Report	Pts: A Poniard 0-11 (0-1 65, 0-1f), E McClearn 1-1, U O'Connor, M Coen and J Egan 0-2 each, G Lohan, T McAdam, J McMahon, C Leen and D Kinnane 0-1 each

Round 2

25 April 2026 Round 2	Kilkenny	3-11 (20) – (22) 0-22	Galway	Kilkenny
13:00				Venue: UPMC Nowlan Park
	Pts: J Dowling (2-8, 7fs); P Meany (1-0); R Power, B Walsh (0-1 each)	Report	Pts: A Poinard (0-10, 9fs); T Mac Cartaigh (0-5); G Lohan, E McClearn (0-2 each); J Egan, C Larkin, M Coen (0-1 each)

25 April 2026 Round 2	Westmeath	1-19 (22) – (15) 0-15	Dublin	Castletown Geoghegan
13:00				Venue: Woodside Furniture Páirc Mhic Eochagain
	Pts: C Raleigh 0-10 (4f); MJ Long 1-1; D Geary, D Kelly 0-2 each; E Goldrick, C Cleary, C Williams (f), T Wrafter 0-1 apiece.	Report	Pts: R Hession 0-7 (5f, 1 ’65); E Forde, B Farrell 0-2 each; M Dempsey, D Stynes (f), C Kelly, D Ware 0-1 apiece.

25 April 2026 Round 2	Laois	1-10 (13) – (41) 6-23	Wexford	Portlaoise
12:00				Venue: Laois Hire O'Moore Park
	Pts: LJ Cuddy 0-7 (fs), O Gilligan 1-0, D Bowe (f), J Mahony and T Hughes 0-1 each.	Report	Pts: R Kehoe and B Murray 2-2 each, J Tobin 1-4 (0-2fs), B Kennedy 1-2, S Kavanagh 0-4, C Doyle, J Furlong and R Durack 0-2 each, J Downey, C Whelan and R Walsh 0-1 each.

Round 3

2 May 2026 Round 3	Laois	0-13 (13) – (26) 0-26	Westmeath	Portlaoise
12:00				Venue: Laois Hire O'Moore Park
	Pts: J Mahony 0-5, D Bowe 0-2, L Hynes 0-2, A Jones 0-1, C Jones 0-1, O Gilligan 0-1, J O'Connell 0-1.	Report	Pts: C Raleigh 0-9, D Geary 0-6, C Williams 0-3, MJ Long 0-3, C Cleary 0-1, A Doyle 0-2, T Shaw 0-1, E Beehan 0-1.

2 May 2026 Round 3	Wexford	1-19 (22) – (20) 1-17	Kilkenny	Wexford
14:00				Venue: Chadwicks Wexford Park
	Pts: J Tobin 1-7, C Doyle 0-3, R Durack 0-1, S Kavanagh 0-1, R Kehoe 0-2, C Whelan 0-1, B Murray 0-1, B Kennedy 0-1, E Kehoe 0-1, J Downey 0-1.	Report	Pts: J Dowling 1-11.

2 May 2026 Round 3	Dublin	3-15 (24) – (24) 1-21	Galway	Dublin
14:00				Venue: Parnell Park
	Pts: D Ward 2-2; R Hession 0-7 (6f); B Farrell 1-1; C Kelly, H Greene 0-2 each; J Davy 0-1.	Report	Pts: G Lohan 0-6 (4f); A Poniard 0-5 (4f); C Power 1-0; M Coen, T Mac Cárthaigh, T McAdam (0-1 sideline), E McClearn 0-2 each; M Walsh (f), J Egan 0-1 apiece.

=== Leinster Knockout Stage ===
==== Leinster Semi-Finals ====
9 May 2026 Semi-Final	Galway	6-21 (39) - (21) 3-12	Wexford	Portlaoise
12:00	A Poniad 2-4.	Report	J Tobin 1-3, J Cullen 1-0, C Whelan 0-2, C Doyle 0-1, B Kennedy 0-1, J Furlong 0-1, B Murray 0-1, R Kehoe 0-1.	Stadium: Laois Hire O'Moore Park

9 May 2026 Semi-Final	Dublin	1-20 (23) - (24) 2-18	Kilkenny	Dublin
12:00	R Hession 1-11 (1-8f); H Greene 0-3; T Dillon, C Kelly, S Gavigan, J Ledwidge, B Farrell, E Forde 0-1 apiece.	Report	J Dowling 1-8 (1-0pen, 0-5f); R Power 1-2; M Corr 0-3; J Bolger 0-2; O Phelan, J Kavanagh, J Walsh 0-1 apiece.	Stadium: Parnell Park

==== Leinster Final ====
18 May 2026 Final	Galway	3-20 (29) - (28) 3-19 (a.e.t.)	Kilkenny	Portlaoise
19:30	M Coen 0-11 (9fs, 1 65), A Poniard 1-4, T Mac Cártaigh 1-3, C Power 1-0, D Dillon 0-2.	Report	J Dowling 1-10 (7fs), B Walsh 1-4, R Power 1-2, J Kavanagh 0-1, J Walsh 0-1, J Bolger 0-1.	Stadium: Laois Hire O'Moore Park

=== Leinster Tier 2 ===
==== Leinster Tier 2 Group 1 ====
Pos	Team	Pld	W	D	L	SF	SA	Diff	Pts	Qualification
1	Antrim	3	2	0	1	74	55	+19	4	Qualify for Leinster Tier 2 Semi-Finals
2	Kildare	3	2	0	1	71	80	-9	4	Qualify for Leinster Tier 2 Semi-Finals
3	Wicklow	3	1	0	2	62	74	-12	2	
4	Carlow	3	1	0	2	69	67	+2	2	

==== Leinster Tier 2 Group 2 ====
Pos	Team	Pld	W	D	L	SF	SA	Diff	Pts	Qualification
1	Offaly	2	2	0	0	76	31	+45	4	Qualify for Leinster Tier 2 Semi-Finals
2	Kerry	2	1	0	1	45	69	-24	2	Qualify for Leinster Tier 2 Semi-Finals
3	Meath	2	0	0	2	34	55	-21	0	

==== Leinster Tier 2 Semi-Finals ====
9 May 2026 Semi-Final	Antrim	1-19 (22) - (15) 1-12	Kerry	Rathanieska
14:00

9 May 2026 Semi-Final	Offaly	4-12 (24) - (20) 2-14	Kildare	Kilcormac
12:00

==== Leinster Tier 2 Final ====
16 May 2026 Final	Antrim	4-14 (26) - (17) 0-17	Offaly	Dublin
12:30				Stadium: Parnell Park

== Munster Minor Hurling Championship ==
=== Munster Group Stage ===
==== Munster Group Stage Table ====
Advance to Munster final and All-Ireland series Advance to All-Ireland preliminary quarter-finals

Team	Matches				Score			Pts
Team	Pld	W	D	L	For	Against	Diff	Pts
Tipperary	4	4	0	0	100	80	+20	8
Limerick	4	2	0	2	78	69	+9	4
Cork	4	2	0	2	71	74	-3	4
Clare	4	1	0	3	78	93	-15	2
Waterford	4	1	0	3	67	78	-11	2

==== Munster Group Stage Matches ====
Round 1

3 April 2026 Round 1	Tipperary	4-20 (32) – (28) 3-19	Clare	Thurles
19:00				Venue: FBD Semple Stadium
	Pts: C Dunne (1-8, 5f, 1 '65), Z O’Keeffe (2-0), C Morrisson (0-5), KJ Dunne (1-1), E Tucker (0-2), H Healy, C Ryan, S Ryan, O Kennedy (0-1 each).	Report	Pts: B Talty (2-9, 1-0 pen, 7f), J O’Donnell (1-2), I Hassett (0-3), G Madden, S Connellan, I O’Brien, C Coffey, M Sheehan (0-1 each).

3 April 2026 Round 1	Limerick	1-14 (17) – (20) 1-17	Waterford	Limerick
19:00				Venue: TUS Gaelic Grounds
	Pts: S Waters (0-7; 0-7 frees); G O’Brien (1-1); J O’Riordan, E O’Sullivan, J Roche (0-2 each).	Reports	Pts: Dylan Murphy (0-10; 0-3 frees); C Delaney (1-1); R Molumphy (0-4); J Mullally, J Walsh (0-1 each).

Round 2

10 April 2026 Round 2	Waterford	0-09 (9) – (12) 0-12	Cork	Dungarvan
19:00				Venue: Cappoquin Logistics Fraher Field
	Pts: Dylan Murphy 0-5 (0-4 f), C Delaney 0-2 (0-1 f), E Walsh, D Flannery 0-1 each.	Report	Pts: T Murphy (0-2 f), T McCarthy, S McHugh 0-2 each, S McCarthy, C Murphy, T Huggins, S Ring (0-1 f) 0-1 each.

11 April 2026 Round 2	Clare	0-12 (12) – (18) 2-12	Limerick	Ziomer Biomet Páirc Chíosóg
14:00
	Pts: B Talty 0-7 (5 frees, 1 ‘65); J O’Donnell 0-2; G Madden, D McKenna, C Daly 0-1 each.	Report	Pts: S Waters 1-5 (1-0 pen; 0-3 frees); G O’Brien 1-1; R Foley 0-2; J O’Riordan, E O’Sullivan, E Hennessy, X Neligan 0-1 each.

Round 3

17 April 2026 Round 3	Tipperary	2-17 (23) – (16) 0-16	Cork	Thurles
19:00				Venue: FBD Semple Stadium
	Pts: C Dunne 1-6 (1-0 pen, 0-3 f), C Morrisson 0-4, KJ Dunne 1-1, C Gantley 0-2, J Finn, S Ryan, H Healy (0-1 sl), R McGrath 0-1 each.	Report	Pts: S Ring 0-7 (0-6 f), L O’Regan 0-3, T McCarthy, R Cagney 0-2 each, T Murphy, C Barry 0-1 each.

24 April 2026 Round 3	Clare	1-20 (23) – (18) 2-12	Waterford	Sixmilebridge
19:00
	Pts: B Talty (0-6, 5f), J O’Donnell (0-4), N Belenko (1-0), O Duignan (0-3), C Daly (0-2), D McKenna (0-2), P Murphy (0-1, 1f), G Madden (0-1), C Mullins (0-1)	Report	Pts: D Murphy (0-8, 4f, 1 ‘65), D Flannery (2-1), C Delaney (0-2), M Moloney (0-1)

Round 4

30 April 2026 Round 4	Limerick	0-16 (16) – (19) 2-13	Tipperary	Limerick
19:00				Venue: TUS Gaelic Grounds
	Pts: S Waters 0-12 (0-10 frees, 0-1 65); E O’Sullivan 0-3; D Crowe 0-1	Report	Pts: O Roche 1-2 (0-2 frees); C Morrison 0-4; R McGrath 1-1; S Ryan (0-1 free); C Kennedy 0-2 each; KJ Dunne, S Burke 0-1 each.	Referee: P O'Mahoney (Cork)

1 May 2026 Round 4	Cork	1-22 (25) – (15) 1-12	Clare	Cork
19:00				Venue: Páirc Uí Rinn
	Pts: B Power 0-8 (0-4 f), T McCarthy 1-2, C Coffey 0-4, S Ring 0-3 (0-2 f), C Murphy 0-2, T Murphy, S Riordan, R Cagney 0-1 each.	Report	Pts: B Talty 0-6 (0-4 f), J O’Donnell 1-2, I Hassett, C Mullins, M Sheehan, P Murphy (0-1 f) 0-1 each.	Referee: C Ryan (Tipperary)

Round 5

8 May 2026 Round 5	Cork	0-18 (18) – (27) 2-21	Limerick	Cork
19:00				Venue: Páirc Uí Rinn
	Pts: B Power 0-9 (0-8 f, 0-1 65), R Cagney 0-4, T Huggins 0-2, S McHugh, C Murphy, C Coffey 0-1 each.	Report	Pts: S Waters 0-7 (0-4 f), D Crowe 1-2, X Nelligan 1-1, R Foley 0-3, D Long 0-2, D O’Grady, E O’Sullivan, C Hickey, E Hennessy, R Horgan, J O’Riordan 0-1 each.	Referee: Eoghan O'Leary (Clare)

8 May 2026 Round 2	Waterford	1-17 (20) – (26) 3-17	Tipperary	Dungarvan
19:00				Venue: Cappoquin Logistics Fraher Field
	Pts: C Delaney (1-4); D Murphy (0-7); D Flannery, D Sullivan, M Moloney, E Walsh, J O’Sullivan and A Cummins (0-1 each).	Report	Pts: R McGrath (2-2); J Moroney (1-4; 0-2f); O Roche (0-5; 0-4f); J O’Meara (0-3); S Burke, E Tucker and C Ryan (0-1 each).	Referee: Niall Fahy (Cork)

=== Munster Final ===
15 May 2026 Final	Tipperary	3-16 (25) – (18) 0-18	Limerick	Thurles
	Gls: C Morrisson (2-4); C Dunne (0-6, 4 frees, 1 65); KJ Dunne (1-0); É Tucker 0-3; J Finn (free), S Ryan, Z O’Keeffe (0-1 each).	Report	Gls: S Waters (0-8, 4 frees, 1 65); J Roche, E O’Sullivan (0-2 each); J O’Riordan, X Nelligan (s/l), R Foley, D Long, G O’Brien, R Horgan (0-1 each).	Referee: S Walsh (Waterford)

== All-Ireland Minor Hurling Championship ==
=== Bracket ===
Preliminary Quarter-Finals
Dublin	2-17
Clare	3-17
Cork	2-18
Wexford	2-15

Quarter-Finals
Limerick	2-15
Clare	0-13
Kilkennny	1-16
Cork	2-25

Semi-Finals
Galway	1-15
Limerick	1-26
Tipperary	5-18
Cork	2-19

All-Ireland Minor Hurling Final
Limerick
Tipperary

=== All-Ireland Preliminary Quarter-Finals ===
23 May 2026 Preliminary Quarter-Final	Dublin	2-17 (23) - (26) 3-17	Clare	Thurles
13:00	R Hession 1-12 (1-0 pen, 0-9f, 0-1 ’65); D Ware 1-0; C Kelly 0-2; P Batten, B Farrell, E Forde 0-1 apiece.	Report	B Talty 1-9 (1-6f); G Madden 2-2; C Mullins, M Sheehan, T O’Dea, S Connellan, C Daly, J O’Donnell 0-1 apiece.	Stadium: FBD Semple Stadium

23 May 2026 Preliminary Quarter-Final	Cork	2-18 (24) - (21) 2-15	Wexford	Thurles
15:00	B Power 0-7 (0-4 f), S McCarthy 1-2, E Considine 1-0, C Coffey, C Murphy 0-2 each, F Cahill, D Nolan, S McHugh, T McCarthy, L O’Regan 0-1 each.	Report	J Tobin 1-5 (1-4 f , 0-1 sl), J Downey 1-0, S Kavanagh 0-3, J Cullen, R Walsh 0-2 each, C Whelan, J Furlong, B Murray 0-1 each.	Stadium: FBD Semple Stadium

=== All-Ireland Quarter-Finals ===
30 May 2026 Quarter-Final	Limerick	2-15 (21) - (13) 0-13	Clare	Thurles
13:00	S Waters (1-9, 1-0 penalty, 0-7 frees, 0-1 65); R Horgan (1-0); Z Bennis (0-2); E Hennessy, D Crowe, E O’Sullivan, C Burke, P Collins (0-1 each).	Report	B Talty (0-8, 8 frees); O Duignan, D Moran, C Mullins, J O’Donnell, M Sheehan (0-1 each).	Stadium: FBD Semple Stadium

30 May 2026 Quarter-Final	Kilkenny	1-16 (19) - (31) 2-25	Cork	Thurles
15:00	J Dowling 0-10 (0-6 f), J Kavanagh 1-0, P Grace 0-2, J Bolger, C O’Neill Pembroke, J Walsh, R Lacey 0-1 each.	Report	B Power 0-10 (0-9 f), S Riordan 1-2, C Coffey 1-1, R Cagney, S McCarthy 0-3 each, S McHugh 0-2, N Coffey, D Nolan, T Huggins, T McCarthy 0-1 each.	Stadium: FBD Semple Stadium

=== All-Ireland Semi-Finals ===
13 June 2026 Semi-Final	Tipperary	5-18 (33) - (25) 2-19	Cork	Limerick
14:00	C Dunne 3-5 (0-2 f, 0-2 sl), É Tucker 1-4, C Morrisson 0-4, J Moroney 1-1, S Ryan, C Kennedy, Z O’Keeffe, KJ Dunne 0-1 each.	Report	B Power 2-8 (0-6 f), S McCarthy 0-3, S Riordan, R Cagney 0-2 each, L O’Regan, S McHugh, C Coffey, C Murphy 0-1 each.	Stadium: TUS Gaelic Grounds

13 June 2026 Semi-Final	Galway	1-15 (18) - (29) 1-26	Limerick	Ennis
17:00	M Coen (0-5, 0-4 frees), G Lohan 1-1, A Poinard and T Mac Cárthaigh 0-3 each, E McLearn and 0-2, K Boyle 0-1.	Report	S Waters (0-9, 0-6 frees),R Horgan 0-5, X Nelligan 1-2, E O’Sullivan 0-3, R Foley and Z Bennis 0-2 each, J O’Riordan, D Crowe and JR O’Reilly 0-1 each.	Stadium: Cusack Park

=== All-Ireland Final ===
27 June 2026 Final	Limerick	2-12 (18) - (17) 1-14	Tipperary	Limerick
15:00	S Waters 1-6 (1-0p, 4fs); G O’Brien 1-1; D Crowe, E O’Sullivan 0-2 each; J Ross O’Reilly 0-1.	Report	C Dunne 1-7 (5fs); C Morrisson 0-3; C Kennedy, KJ Dunne 0-2 each.	Stadium: TUS Gaelic Grounds; Attendance: 12,526; Referee: C Flynn (Westmeath)

== Championship statistics ==
=== Top scorers ===
Rank	Player	County	Tally	Total	Matches	Average
1	Joe Dowling	Kilkenny	7-56	77	6	12.83
2	Shane Waters	Limerick	3-63	72	8	9.00
3	Richie Hession	Dublin	3-45	54	5	10.80
4	Ben Talty	Clare	3-45	54	6	9.00
5	Chris Dunne	Tipperary	6-32	50	6	8.33
6	Bobby Power	Cork	2-42	48	6	8.00
7	Anthony Poniard	Galway	3-34	43	5	8.60
8	Joey Tobin	Wexford	5-25	40	5	8.00
9	L. J. Cuddy	Laois	1-36	39	4	9.75
9	Conor Raleigh	Westmeath	0-39	39	5	7.80
