= 2003 All-Ireland Minor Hurling Championship =

All-Ireland Minor Hurling Championship 2003
Championship Details
- Dates: 5 April 2003 – 14 September 2003

All Ireland Champions
- Winners: Kilkenny (18th win)
- Captain: Richie Power
- Manager: Damien Brennan

All Ireland Runners-up
- Runners-up: Galway
- Captain: Niall Healy
- Manager: Mattie Murphy

Provincial Champions
- Munster: Tipperary
- Leinster: Kilkenny
- Ulster: Antrim
- Connacht: Not Played

Championship Statistics
- Top Scorer: Richie Power (1-29)

The 2003 All-Ireland Minor Hurling Championship was the 73rd staging of the All-Ireland Minor Hurling Championship since its establishment by the Gaelic Athletic Association in 1928. The championship began on 5 April 2003 and ended on 14 September 2003.

Kilkenny entered the championship as defending champions.

On 14 September 2003, Kilkenny won the championship following a 2–16 to 2–15 defeat of Galway in the All-Ireland final. This was their 18th championship title overall and their second title in succession.

Kilkenny's Richie Power was the championship's top scorer with 1-29.

== Results ==
=== Leinster Minor Hurling Championship ===
Group A

Team	Matches				Score			Pts
Team	Pld	W	D	L	For	Against	Diff	Pts
Laois	2	2	0	0	4-25	0-11	26	4
Carlow	2	1	0	1	2-18	4-18	-6	2
Kildare	2	0	0	2	2-17	4-31	-20	0

5 April 2003 Round 1	Kildare	0-09 - 2-15	Laois	St. Conleth's Park, Newbridge
	C Doyle 0-7, L Harney 0-2.		D Bergin 0-4, C Healy 1-0, B Fitzgerald 1-0, J Dunne 0-3, D Guilfoyle 0-2, J Brophy 0-2, K Murphy 0-2, S Hanlon 0-2.

12 April 2003 Round 2	Carlow	2-16 - 2-08	Kildare	Dr. Cullen Park, Carlow
	A Quirke 1-4, R Dunbar 0-6, S Watchorn 1-0, K Foley 0-2, L Murphy 0-1, B Cox 0-1, J Murphy 0-1, J Miley 0-1.		C Doyle 1-6, L Harney 1-2.

26 April 2003 Round 3	Laois	2-10 - 0-02	Carlow	O'Moore Park, Portlaoise
	S Hanlon 1-2, B Fitzgerald 1-1, J Brophy 0-4, J Dunne 0-2, B McEvoy 0-1.		R Dunbar 0-2.

Group B

Team	Matches				Score			Pts
Team	Pld	W	D	L	For	Against	Diff	Pts
Westmeath	2	2	0	0	3-26	4-15	8	4
Meath	2	1	0	1	4-19	2-19	6	2
Wicklow	2	0	0	2	4-12	5-23	-14	0

5 April 2003 Round 1	Westmeath	1-13 - 1-09	Meath	Cusack Park, Mullingar
	K Cosgrove 0-5, J Clarke 1-3, D McNicholas 0-1, L Boyle 0-1, L Clarke 0-1, C O'Leary 0-1, M Curley 0-1.		S Moran 0-4, E Broad 1-1, P Finnegan 0-1, S Ashe 0-1, J Meyler 0-1, D Wallace 0-1.

12 April 2003 Round 2	Wicklow	3-06 - 2-13	Westmeath	Aughrim County Ground, Aughrim
	S Furlong 1-4, C Kavanagh 1-1, P Nolan 1-0, A Tiernan 0-1.		K Cosgrove 1-6, J Clarke 1-0, P Greville 0-2, A Corrigan 0-2, F Boyle 0-2, M Curley 0-1.

26 April 2003 Round 3	Meath	3-10 - 1-06	Wicklow	Páirc Tailteann, Navan
	S Ashe 1-1, D Kirby 1-1, S Moran 1-0, D Kirwan 0-2, D Wallace 0-2, P Donoghue 0-1, E Broad 0-1, R Gilsenan 0-1.		B Nolan 1-1, C Kavanagh 0-2, A O'Brien 0-2, A Tiernan 0-1.

Quarter-finals

10 May 2003 Quarter-final	Laois	0-09 - 1-09	Offaly	O'Moore Park, Portlaoise
	D Bergin 0-5, J Dunne 0-1, J Brophy 0-1, B Fitzgerald 0-1, J Rowney 0-1.		D Molloy 1-2, D Cordial 0-2, G O'Grady 0-1, D Hayden 0-1, J Keane 0-1, J Bergin 0-1, E Lee 0-1.	Referee: J Owens (Wexford)

10 May 2003 Quarter-final	Dublin	1-16 - 0-03	Westmeath	Parnell Park, Dublin
	G Morris 0-7, D Walsh 1-1, D Byrne 0-3, B Kennedy 0-2, D O'Reilly 0-1, G O'Meara 0-1, P Carton 0-1.		K Cosgrove 0-2, D McNicholas 0-1.	Referee: F Smith (Meath)

Semi-finals

25 June 2003 Semi-final	Kilkenny	4-12 - 0-11	Dublin	O'Moore Park, Portlaoise
	A Murphy, R Power 1-4 each, A Healy, E Guinan 1-1 each, D McCormack 0-2.	Report	A McCrabbe 0-4 (all frees), I Fleming 0-2, S O'Sullivan, M Griffin, R Higgins, B Kennedy, P Carton 0-1 each.	Referee: S Whelan (Wexford)

25 June 2003 Semi-final	Offaly	2-16 - 0-12	Wexford	Dr. Cullen Park, Carlow
	G O'Grady (1-3), S Delaney (1-2), D Cordial (0-5), J Keane (0-2), N Rogers, J Bergin, D Molloy, E Bevans (0-1) each.	Report	R Kehoe (0-4), S Ryan (0-3), M Doyle, L Kinsella (0-2) each, S Nolan (0-1).	Referee: J Quinlan (Carlow)

Final

6 July 2003 Final	Kilkenny	0-18 - 0-13	Offaly	Croke Park, Dublin
	R Power 0-6 (4f), E Guinan 0-4, J Fitzpatrick 0-2, A Murphy 0-2, A Healy 0-2, M Nolan 0-2.	Report	D Cordial 0-9 (9f), S Delaney 0-3, G O'Grady 0-1.	Referee: A Stapleton (Laois)

=== Munster Minor Hurling Championship ===
First round

9 April 2003 First round	Limerick	5-15 - 0-03	Kerry	Bruff
	P McNamara 2-2, P Ryan 2-1, P Kirby 1-4, P Russell 0-3, O Benson 0-2, P Hyland 0-1, C O'Brien 0-1, E O'Leary 0-1.		R Galvin 0-3.

9 April 2003 First round	Cork	0-15 - 0-05	Clare	FitzGerald Park, Kilmallock
	M O'Sullivan 0-6, A Ó hAilpín 0-3, M Harrington 0-3, B Canty 0-2, D Lucey 0-1.		T Kierse 0-2, M O'Hanlon 0-1, D O'Halloran 0-1, N Dunne 0-1.

9 April 2003 First round	Tipperary	1-09 - 0-10	Waterford	Semple Stadium, Thurles
	R Ruth 1-4, S Cleary 0-2, J McLoughney 0-2, C Larkin 0-1.		S O'Sullivan 0-3, D Hickey 0-2, S Quirke 0-2, J Nagle 0-2, M Hoban 0-1.

Playoffs

21 April 2003 Playoff	Clare	3-14 - 1-07	Kerry	Cusack Park, Ennis
	B Gaffney 2-4, S O'Brien 1-1, D O'Halloran 0-3, M O'Hanlon 0-2, A Griffey 0-2, R Keane 0-1, T Kierse 0-1.		S Young 1-0, R Galvin 0-2, G O'Grady 0-2, M Bowler 0-1, D O'Connor 0-1, J Houlihan 0-1.

30 April 2003 Playoff	Clare	2-12 - 1-10	Waterford	Semple Stadium, Thurles
	B Gaffney 1-5, D O'Halloran 1-1, N McMahon 0-2, A Browne, T Kierse, M Hawes, J Clancy 0-1 each.		S O'Sullivan 0-8, D Hickey 1-0, M Hoban 0-2.

Semi-finals

14 May 2003 Semi-final	Tipperary	1-09 - 2-01	Limerick	Semple Stadium, Thurles
	R Ruth 1-5, S Long 0-2, D Sheppard 0-1, K Bergin 0-1.		P Kirby 1-1, P McNamara 1-0.

14 May 2003 Semi-final	Cork	0-11 - 0-07	Clare	FitzGerald Park, Kilmallock
	M Allen 0-3, B Ring 0-2, B Barry 0-2, B Coleman 0-1, D Lucey 0-1, A Ó hAilpín 0-1, M O'Sullivan 0-1.		R Keane 0-3, M O'Hanlon 0-1, N Dunne 0-1, T Kierse 0-1, B Gaffney 0-1.

Final

29 June 2003 Final	Tipperary	2-12 - 0-16	Cork	Semple Stadium, Thurles
	S Long 2-1, R Ruth 0-4, S O'Brien 0-2, D Sheppard 0-2, D Young 0-1, R McGrath 0-1, D Morrissey 0-1.		A Ó hAilpín 0-5, B Barry 0-3, B Canty 0-2, M Allen 0-2, B Coleman 0-1, D Lucey 0-1, M Ahern 0-1, B Ring 0-1.	Referee: D O'Driscoll (Limerick)

=== Ulster Minor Hurling Championship ===
Final

14 June 2003 Final	Antrim	2-11 - 2-09	Derry	Casement Park, Derry
	J Scullion 1-4, S McGarry 1-1, N Grego 0-3, C Boyle 0-2, A Ó Cearúlain 0-1.		M Lynch 1-2, Biggs 0-5, B McGoldrick 1-0, N Mullan 0-1, C Bell 0-1.

=== All-Ireland Senior Hurling Championship ===
Quarter-finals

27 July 2003 Quarter-final	Galway	5-19 - 2-07	Antrim	Croke Park, Dublin
	A Callanan 3-4, D Reilly 2-3, N Healy 0-3 (0-2f), N Callanan, E Fenton, K Wade (0-1f) 0-2 each, D Garvey, D Kelly, C Burke 0-1 each.	Report	J Scullion 0-4 (0-3f), S McGarry 1-1, N Grego 1-0, P Cunningham 0-2.	Referee: F Smith (Meath)

27 July 2003 Quarter-final	Cork	2-11 - 2-05	Offaly	Semple Stadium, Thurles
	M Aherne 1-0, K Canty 1-0, B Canty 0-2, M Harrington 0-2, R Conway 0-2, G O'Leary 0-1, B Barry 0-1, B Clifford 0-1, S Cronin 0-1, A Ó hAilpín 0-1.		D Cordial 1-3, D Molloy 1-0, C Parlon 0-1, J Bergin 0-1.	Referee: S Roche (Tipperary)

Semi-finals

10 August 2003 Semi-final	Tipperary	2-16 - 2-19	Galway	Croke Park, Dublin
	D Hickey 0-5, R Ruth 0-4, D Young 1-1, D Sheppard 1-0, S O’Brien 0-1, K Bergin 0-1, R McGrath 0-1, S Long 0-1, S Cleary 0-1, D Egan 0-1.	Report	N Healy 0-10, D Reilly 2-0, N Callanan 0-5, A Callanan 0-4.	Referee: É Morris (Dublin)

17 August 2003 Semi-final	Kilkenny	0-15 - 2-08	Cork	Croke Park, Dublin
	R Power 0-10 (0-8 frees), P Hartley and E Guinan 0-2 each, J Fitzpatrick 0-1.	Report	K Canty 1-1, D Dorris 1-0, M O’Sullivan 0-3 frees, R Conway 0-2, M Aherne free, and O Manning 0-1 each.	Referee: B Kelly (Westmeath)

Final

14 September 2003 Final	Kilkenny	2-16 - 2-15	Galway	Croke Park, Dublin
	R Power 0-9 (5f), E Guinan, J Fitzpatrick 1-2 each, M Nolan 0-2, D Cody 0-1.	Report	N Healy 1-10 (0-8fs), N Callanan 1-1, D Reilly 0-2, A Callanan, E Fenton 0-1 each.	Referee: D Kirwan (Cork)

== Championship statistics ==
=== Top scorers ===
Top scorers overall

Rank	Player	Club	Tally	Total	Matches	Average
1	Richie Power	Kilkenny	1-29	32	4	8.00
2	Niall Healy	Galway	1-23	26	3	8.66
3	Richie Ruth	Tipperary	2-17	23	4	5.75
4	Declan Cordial	Offaly	1-19	22	4	5.50
5	Bernard Gaffney	Clare	3-10	19	3	6.33
6	Aonghus Callanan	Galway	3-09	18	3	6.00
7	Derrick Reilly	Galway	4-05	17	3	5.66
8	Conan Doyle	Kildare	1-13	16	2	8.00
8	Killian Cosgrove	Westmeath	1-13	16	3	5.66
10	Eoin Guinan	Kilkenny	1-13	15	4	3.75

Top scorers in a single game

Rank	Player	Club	Tally	Total	Opposition
1	Aonghus Callanan	Galway	3-04	13	Antrim
1	Niall Healy	Galway	1-10	13	Kilkenny
3	Bernard Gaffney	Clare	2-04	10	Kerry
3	Niall Healy	Galway	0-10	10	Tipperary
3	Richie Power	Kilkenny	0-10	10	Cork
6	Derrick Reilly	Galway	2-03	9	Antrim
6	Conan Doyle	Kildare	1-06	9	Carlow
6	Killian Cosgrove	Westmeath	1-06	9	Wicklow
6	Richie Power	Kilkenny	0-09	9	Galway
6	Declan Cordial	Offaly	0-09	9	Kilkenny
