= 1965 All-Ireland Minor Hurling Championship =

All-Ireland Minor Hurling Championship 1965
All Ireland Champions
- Winners: Dublin (4th win)
- Captain: Liam Martin

All Ireland Runners-up
- Runners-up: Limerick
- Captain: Michael O'Flaherty

Provincial Champions
- Munster: Limerick
- Leinster: Dublin
- Ulster: Antrim
- Connacht: Leitrim

The 1965 All-Ireland Minor Hurling Championship was the 35th staging of the All-Ireland Minor Hurling Championship since its establishment by the Gaelic Athletic Association in 1928.

Cork entered the championship as the defending champions, however, they were beaten by Limerick in the Munster semi-final.

The All-Ireland final was played at Croke Park in Dublin on 5 September 1965 between Dublin and Limerick, in what was their first ever meeting in the final. Dublin won the match by 4-10 to 2-07 to claim their fourth All-Ireland title overall and a first title in 11 years.

== All-Ireland Minor Hurling Championship ==
=== All-Ireland semi-finals ===
15 August 1965 Semi-final	Limerick	15-13 - 6-03	Leitrim	St Brendan's Park
	S Burke 5-0, B Murnane 4-1, N Hayes 2-4, C Shanahan 2-1, É Grimes 2-1, M Grace 0-3, N Boland 0-2, D Foley 0-1.		Canning 3-0, Keane 1-3, Moran 1-0, Kelly 1-0.

15 August 1965 Semi-final	Dublin	6-16 - 1-04	Antrim	Croke Park
	Davey 2-5, Whelan 2-3, Grealish 1-2, McCann 1-2, McDonnell 0-3, Kinsella 0-1.		Doran 1-1, McKinney 0-1, McAllister 0-1, Carson 0-1.

=== All-Ireland final ===
5 September 1965 Final	Dublin	4-10 - 2-07	Limerick	Croke Park
	T McCann 1-1, P Cassells 1-1, N Kinsella 0-4, J Fetherston 1-0, B Whelan 1-0, H Dalton 0-3, E Davey 0-1.		É Grimes 1-2, M Grace 1-0, N Hayes 0-2, S Burke 0-1, C Shanahan 0-1, M Hennessy 0-1.	Referee: A Higgins (Galway)

== Championship statistics ==
=== Miscellaneous ===
- Leitrim won the Connacht Championship for the first and only time in their history.
- The All-Ireland final between Dublin and Limerick was the first ever championship meeting the two teams.
