= Fintan O'Shea =

Irish hurler

Personal information
- Native name: Fionntán Ó Sé (Irish)
- Born: 25 March 1974 (age 52) Portlaw, County Waterford, Ireland
- Occupation: Factory worker
- Height: 5 ft 11 in (180 cm)

Sport
- Sport: Hurling
- Position: Midfield
Club
- Years: Club
- Portlaw
Club titles
- Waterford titles: 0
Inter-county
- Years: County
- 1993-1996: Waterford
Inter-county titles
- Munster titles: 0
- All-Irelands: 0
- NHL: 0
- All Stars: 0

Fintan O'Shea (born 25 March 1974) is an Irish former hurler. At club level, he played for Portlaw and at inter-county level with the Waterford senior hurling team.

== Career ==
O'Shea played hurling at all grades during his time at secondary school in Carrick-on-Suir CBS, winning a Munster Colleges U16HC medal. At club level, he played with Portlaw.

At inter-county level, O'shea first played for Waterford at minor level. He was part of the Waterford team beaten by Galway in the 1992 All-Ireland minor final. O'Shea progressed to the under-21 team and claimed a Munster U21HC title in 1994. He later spent a number of seasons with the senior team.

== Honours ==
Waterford

- Munster Under-21 Hurling Championship: 1994
- Munster Minor Hurling Championship: 1992
