= John Joe Ronayne =

Irish hurler

Personal information
- Native name: Seán Seosamh Ó Rónáin (Irish)
- Nickname: JJ
- Born: 16 March 1975 (age 51) Dungarvan, County Waterford, Ireland
- Height: 5 ft 11 in (180 cm)

Sport
- Sport: Hurling
- Position: Left wing-forward
Club
- Years: Club
- Dungarvan
Club titles
- Waterford titles: 0
College
- Years: College
- University College Cork
Inter-county
- Years: County
- 1994-: Waterford
Inter-county titles
- Munster titles: 0
- All-Irelands: 0
- NHL: 0
- All Stars: 0

John Joe Ronayne (born 25 March 1974) is an Irish former hurler. At club level, he played for Dungarvan and at inter-county level with the Waterford senior hurling team.

== Career ==
Ronayne played hurling at all grades during his time in secondary school at Dungarvan CBS, winning several Munster Colleges titles. At club level, he first played with Dungarvan at juvenile and underage levels, winning consecutive Waterford MFC medals, before progressing to adult level.

At inter-county level, Ronayne first played for Waterford at minor level. He was part of the Waterford team beaten by Galway in the 1992 All-Ireland minor final. Ronayne progressed to the under-21 team and claimed a Munster U21HC title in 1994. He later spent a number of seasons with the senior team.

== Honours ==
Dungarvan

- Waterford Minor Football Championship: 1991, 1992

Waterford

- Munster Under-21 Hurling Championship: 1994
- Munster Minor Hurling Championship: 1992
