= 1983 All-Ireland Minor Hurling Championship =

All-Ireland Minor Hurling Championship 1983
All Ireland Champions
- Winners: Galway (1st win)
- Captain: Anthony Cunningham

All Ireland Runners-up
- Runners-up: Dublin

Provincial Champions
- Munster: Tipperary
- Leinster: Dublin
- Ulster: Not Played
- Connacht: Not Played

The 1983 All-Ireland Minor Hurling Championship was the 53rd staging of the All-Ireland Minor Hurling Championship since its establishment by the Gaelic Athletic Association in 1928.

Tipperary entered the championship as the defending champions, however, they were beaten by Galway in the All-Ireland semi-final.

On 4 September 1983, Galway won the championship following a 0-10 to 0-7 defeat of Dublin in the All-Ireland final. This was their first ever All-Ireland title.

== Results ==
=== Munster Minor Hurling Championship ===
First round

27 April 1983 First round	Kerry	1-04 - 4-15	Limerick	Hermitage Park, Lixnaw
	S McCrohan 1-0, J O'Sullivan 0-3, S Sheehan 0-1.		R Sampson 1-6, M Sweeeney 2-2, A Connelly 0-4, B Finn 1-0, B Stapleton 0-2, M Ryan 0-1.

27 April 1983 First round	Tipperary	2-15 - 1-06	Clare	Bruff
	M Bryan 2-2, M Cunningham 0-5, A Ryan 0-3, M Murphy 0-2, L Nolan 0-1, P Ryan 0-1, B Everard 0-1.		P Doyle 0-4, T Guilfoyle 1-0, S Cusack 0-1, N Romer 0-1.	Referee: N Duggan (Limerick)

Semi-finals

11 May 1983 Semi-final	Tipperary	0-11 - 1-07	Waterford	Páirc Mac Gearailt, Fermoy
	D Quirke 0-8, M Cunningham 0-1, M Bryan 0-1, M Murphy 0-1.		P Queally 1-1, P Murray 0-2, D Byrne 0-2, P Coffey 0-1, K Ryan 0-1.	Referee: W Horgan (Cork)

11 May 1983 Semi-final	Cork	1-15 - 2-13	Limerick	Páirc Uí Chaoimh, Cork
	P Buckley 1-1, T McCarthy 0-4, E Lingane 0-2, J Cashman 0-2, M Dineen 0-2, D Walsh 0-2, B Searles 0-1, D O'Mahony 0-1.		D Mulcahy 1-4, R Sampson 1-3, B Finn 0-2, M Sweeney 0-1, T Murnane 0-1, A Carmody 0-1, G Fitzgerald 0-1.

Final

10 July 1983 Final	Limerick	2-08 - 3-15	Tipperary	Gaelic Grounds, Limerick
	A Carmody 1-3, R Sampson 1-1, G Browne 0-3, M Sweeney 0-1.		P Ryan 2-1, D Quirke 0-7, L Nolan 1-1, M Cunningham 0-3, A Ryan 0-1, M Murphy 0-1, M Brien 0-1.	Referee: W Horgan (Cork)

=== All-Ireland Minor Hurling Championship ===
Semi-finals

7 August 1983 Semi-final	Galway	3-10 - 3-10	Tipperary	Croke Park, Dublin
	A Cunningham 2-1, J Cooney 0-5, S Keane 1-0, D Jennings 0-3, T Moloney 0-1.		L Nolan 2-1, R Quirke 0-7, P Ryan 1-0, A Ryan 0-1, M Bryan 0-1.	Referee: J Denton (Wexford)

21 August 1983 Semi-final replay	Galway	1-07 - 0-08	Tipperary	Cusack Park, Ennis
	J Cooney 1-2, D Jennings 0-2, T Monaghan 0-1, P Higgins 0-1, G Elwood 0-1.		D Quirke 0-5, M Cleary 0-1, M Cunningham 0-1, M Bryan 0-1.	Referee: J Denton (Wexford)

Final

4 September 1983 Final	Galway	0-10 - 0-07	Dublin	Croke Park, Dublin
	J Cooney 0-4, S Keane 0-3, T Moloney 0-2, JJ Broderick 0-1.		P Williams 0-4, S Dalton 0-2, N Quinn 0-1.	Referee: P Long (Kilkenny)
