= 2025 All-Ireland Minor Hurling Championship =

2025 hurling competition for male players under the age of 17

All-Ireland Minor Hurling Championship 2025
Championship Details
- Dates: 22 March - 28 June 2025
- Teams: 18

All Ireland Champions
- Winners: Waterford (4th win)
- Captain: James Comerford
- Manager: James O'Connor

All Ireland Runners-up
- Runners-up: Clare
- Captain: Graham Ball
- Manager: Ger O'Connell

Provincial Champions
- Munster: Cork
- Leinster: Kilkenny
- Ulster: Not Played
- Connacht: Not Played

Championship Statistics
- Matches Played: 47
- Total Goals: 164 (3.48 per game)
- Total Points: 1549 (32.95 per game)
- Top Scorer: Cormac Spain (8-74)

The 2025 All-Ireland Minor Hurling Championship was the 95th staging of the All-Ireland Minor Hurling Championship since its establishment by the Gaelic Athletic Association in 1928. The championship ran from 22 March to 28 June 2025.

Tipperary were the defending champions, however, they were eliminated from the competition after failing to win a single game in the group stage.

The All-Ireland final was played on 28 June 2025 at FBD Semple Stadium in Thurles, between Waterford and Clare, in what was their first ever meeting in the final. Waterford won the match by 1–18 to 0–10 to claim their fourth championship title overall and a first tile in 12 years.

Waterford's Cormac Spain was the championship's top scorer with 8-74.

== Leinster Minor Hurling Championship ==
=== Leinster Tier 1 ===
==== Leinster Tier 1 Group Table ====
Advance to Leinster semi-finals Advance to Leinster quarter-finals

Team	Matches				Score			Pts
Team	Pld	W	D	L	For	Against	Diff	Pts
Kilkenny	3	3	0	0	93	54	39	6
Galway	3	2	0	1	80	65	15	4
Wexford	3	1	0	2	54	79	-25	2
Dublin	3	0	0	3	46	75	-29	0

==== Leinster Tier 1 Results ====
20 April 2025 Round 1	Dublin	1-13 - 2-17	Galway	Parnell Park
	R Flannery 0-4 (3f, 1 ‘65’); S Culleton 1-0; R Hession 0-3 (2f); L Hayes, R Duffy, F O’Donnell 0-2 apiece.	Report	E Coleman 2-2; J Shaughnessy 0-5 (3f); C Roche 0-3 (1f); R Cahalan, J Canning, T Mac Cárthaigh 0-2 each; R Burke 0-1.

20 April 2025 Round 1	Kilkenny	1-31 - 0-12	Wexford	UPMC Nowlan Park
	E Brennan 0-7, J Mullen 0-7, O O'Donovan 0-5, C Holohan 1-0, D Behan 0-3, K Barcoe 0-3, K Buggy 0-2, PJ Mackey 0-2, O Henderson 0-1, A Maher 0-1.	Report	S O'Brien 0-6 (0-4f), R Doran 0-2, D Ryan 0-1, E Whelan 0-1, É Quinlan 0-1, J Cullen 0-1.

26 April 2025 Round 2	Wexford	2-15 - 0-12	Dublin	Chadwicks Wexford Park
	S O’Brien 1-6 (0-5f); R Wickham 1-1; J Kennedy 0-2; D Ryan(f), J Sheridan, J Cullen, E Whelan, A Whelan & R Murphy 0-1 each.	Report	R Flannery 0-5 (4f); F O’Donnell, S Culleton 0-2 each; D Ward (f), C O’Sullivan & T Murnane 0-1 each.

26 April 2025 Round 2	Kilkenny	2-22 - 2-18	Galway	UPMC Nowlan Park
	J Mullen 1-8, E Brennan 1-1, O O'Donovan 0-4, B Hickey 0-3, K Buggy 0-1, O Henderson 0-1, D Behan 0-1, B Nevin 0-1, C Holohan 0-1, S Hanrahan 0-1.	Report	J Shaughnessy 2-4, R Cahalan 0-7, T Mac Cárthaigh 0-2, C Roche 0-2, S Keane 0-1, C O'Loughlin 0-1, E Coleman 0-1.

3 May 2025 Round 3	Galway	3-24 - 1-18	Wexford	Kenny Park
	J Shaughnessy 0-7, C Roche 1-2, T Mac Cárthaigh 1-2, R Cahalan 1-2, E Coleman 0-3, G Lohan 0-3, A McDonagh 0-2, S Moran 0-1, C Hannon 0-1, J Canning 0-1.	Report	S O'Brien 1-13(0-11f), E Whelan 0-1(s/l), R Wickham 0-1, É Quinlan 0-1, J Cullen 0-1, D Ryan 0-1.

3 May 2025 Round 3	Dublin	0-18 - 2-25	Kilkenny	O'Toole Park
	R Flannery 0-12 (10f); D O’Connor 0-2; C Kane, S Culleton, F O’Donnell, C O’Sullivan 0-1 apiece.	Report	J Mullen 1-7 (1-0pen, 0-6f, 0-1 ’65); O O’Donovan 1-3; K Buggy 0-3; D Behan, E Brennan, B Hickey, C Byrne 0-2 each; J Dowling, A Maher, K Barcoe, B Nevin 0-1 apiece.

=== Leinster Tier 2 ===
==== Leinster Tier 2 Group 1 Table ====
Advance to Leinster preliminary quarter-finals

Team	Matches				Score			Pts
Team	Pld	W	D	L	For	Against	Diff	Pts
Westmeath	4	4	0	0	120	86	44	8
Offaly	4	3	0	1	112	70	42	6
Antrim	4	2	0	2	101	91	10	4
Meath	4	1	0	2	79	93	-14	2
Wicklow	4	0	0	4	42	124	-82	0

==== Leinster Tier 2 Group 1 Results ====
22 March 2025 Round 1	Wicklow	1-10 - 5-21	Westmeath	Pearse Park
	D Duffy (1-0), R Rooney (0-3), T Brennan (0-3), C Boland (0-1), C Brady (0-1); S Byrne (0-1), J Keeshan (0-1).	Report	C Williams (3-13), P Monaghan (1-2), C Cleary (1-0); C Fleming (0-2), D Burke (0-1), E Beehan (0-1), F Higgins (0-1); E McGrath (0-1).

22 March 2025 Round 1	Offaly	2-14 - 2-11	Meath	Grant Heating St Brendan's Park
	O Fletcher 0-5 (2frees); D Phelan 1-2; J Kirwan 1-1; J Dunican 0-2; M Mitchell; E Maher, O O’Meara and A Martin 0-1 each.	Report	L McIvor 1-7 (1 penalty, 5frees); K Kirwan 1-0; S Snow, C Horan, J Mangan and C Buckley 0-1 each.

5 April 2035 Round 2	Offaly	5-16 - 2-13	Antrim	Páirc Naomh Bríd
	O Fletcher 2-11 (7frees), R Woods 2-1, C Thornton 1-0, E Maher 0-2, M Mitchell and T O’Dwyer 0-1 each.	Report	J McDonnell 1-2 (1 penalty, 1free), C Crawford 1-1 (1free), S Smyth 0-3, D McNaughton and J McAlonan (1free) 0-2 each, C McIntosh and R Taylor 0-1 each.

5 April 2035 Round 2	Meath	3-10 - 0-11	Wicklow	St Loman's Park
	P Anderson (2-1), L McIvor (0-4 two frees), E Flanagan (1-0), C Horan (0-3), C Buckley (0-1), C O'Brien (0-1).	Report	T Brennan (0-7 five frees, one 65'), S Craig (0-2), D Duffy (0-2).

12 April 2025 Round 3	Antrim	2-25 - 1-08	Wicklow	Páirc Naomh Bríd
		Report	T Brennan 1-5.

12 April 2025 Round 3	Westmeath	3-21 - 3-12	Meath	Killucan Grounds
	C Williams 0-10 (5f), D Burke 0-7, C McKeogh and P Monaghan 1-1 each, MJ Long 1-0, F Higgins 0-2.	Report	L McIvor 1-8 (7f; 1 s/line), K Kirwan 1-1, S Snow 1-0, C Buckley, C Horan and E Flanagan 0-1 each.

19 April 2025 Round 4	Westmeath	3-18 - 3-10	Antrim	Joristown Park
	C Williams 1-10 (0-4 from 65s; 0-3f), MJ Long and C McKeogh 1-0 each, P Monaghan 0-3, S Byrne 0-2, E Beehan, O McCauley and E Kiernan 0-1 each.	Report	C Crawford 1-3 (0-2f), D McNaughton 1-2, J Mc Alonan 1-1, R Taylor 0-2, E Johnston and S Smyth 0-1 each.

19 April 2025 Round 4	Offaly	5-23 - 0-07	Wicklow	Glenisk O'Connor Park
	O Fletcher (1-8, 0-3 frees), E Carty (1-3, 1-0 penalty, 0-1 free), J Dunican (1-2), A Martin (1-1), T O'Dwyer (1-0), B Bennett (0-3, 0-2 frees), M Mitchell (0-2), F Carroll, C Thornton, D Phelan, J Collins (0-1 each).	Report	S Shortall (0-2), L Cotter, R Rooney (free), J O'Brien, T Brennan, S Craig (0-1 each).

26 April 2025 Round 5	Meath	1-19 - 3-23	Antrim	Páirc Tailteann
		Report

26 April 2025 Round 5	Westmeath	4-15 - 2-17	Offaly	Raharney Grounds
	C Williams 1-9 (1-9 frees), P Monaghan 2-3, O McCauley 0-2, F Higgins 0-1.	Report	O Fletcher 0-12 (8f and 1 '65'), A Screeney 2-0, E Maher 0-2, D Phelan, M Mitchell and R Woods 0-1 each.

==== Leinster Tier 2 Group 2 Table ====
Advance to Leinster preliminary quarter-finals

Team	Matches				Score			Pts
Team	Pld	W	D	L	For	Against	Diff	Pts
Laois	3	3	0	0	86	35	51	6
Carlow	3	2	0	1	55	54	1	4
Kerry	3	1	0	2	51	69	-18	2
Kildare	3	0	0	3	37	71	-34	0

==== Leinster Tier 2 Group 2 Results ====
5 April 2025 Round 1	Laois	3-18 - 0-11	Kildare	Laois Hire O'Moore Park
	E Delaney 2-5, D Downey 1-0, CJ Brennan 0-3, T Óg Phelan 0-2, LJ Cuddy 0-2, T Mahony 0-2, D Carroll 0-1, L Hynes 0-1, C McDonagh 0-1, D Jones 0-1.	Report	C Durnin 0-5, B Shortt 0-3, O McAfee 0-1, R Byrne 0-1, C Gorman 0-1.

5 April 2025 Round 1	Carlow	2-15 - 2-11	Kerry	Netwatch Cullen Park
	T Sheehan 0-7 (3fs), A Joyce 1-1, J Brennan, J Lillis (2f) 0-3 each, C Kavanagh 0-1	Report	D Costello 1-9 (6fs 65), A Relihan 1-0, M Corridan (f), D O’Flaherty 0-1 each.

12 April 2025 Round 2	Kildare	2-08 - 2-16	Kerry	Manguard Park
	J O'Dea 1-0, B Angland 1-0, C Durnin 0-5, E Lyons 0-1, R Byrne 0-1,	Report	M Corridan 1-3, D Costello 0-6, S Shanahan 1-1, J Rochford 0-2, S Sheehan 0-1, L Hanafin 0-1, A Relihan 0-1, D O'Flaherty 0-1.

12 April 2025 Round 2	Carlow	1-09 - 2-19	Laois	Netwatch Cullen Park
	C Kavanagh 1-1, T Sheehan 0-4, J Brennan 0-1, B Kelly 0-1, A Joyce 0-1, J Lillis 0-1.	Report	D Jones 2-1, T Óg Phelan 0-5, E Delaney 0-3, D Whelan 0-3, O Gilligan 0-2, T Mahony 0-1, C Headen 0-1, C McDonagh 0-1, L Hynes 0-1.

26 April 2025 Round 3	Laois	6-16 - 1-09	Kerry	Laois Hire O'Moore Park
	T Óg Phelan 3-4, E Delaney 3-2, C Headen 0-3, D Whelan 0-3, D Carroll 0-1, T Mahony 0-1, M Cunningham 0-1, A Fitzpatrick 0-1.	Report	C Hurley 1-2, D Costelloe 0-3, M Corridan 0-2, S Shanahan 0-1, B Leen 0-1.

26 April 2025 Round 3	Kildare	0-12 - 3-13	Carlow	Cedral St Conleth's Park
	C Durnin 0-3 (1f), B Shortt 0-2 (1f), L Cahill (65), S Maher, O McAfee, S Quigley, R Byrne, E Lyons, B Gallagher 0-1 each.	Report	C Kavanagh 2-2, T Sheehan 0-5 (4fs), B Kelly 0-3, P Lynch 1-0, J Lillis (f), A Joyce, J Brennan 0-1 each

=== Leinster Knockout Stage ===
Preliminary Quarter-Finals
Laois	7-23
Offaly	0-13
Westmeath	1-19
Carlow	0-11

Quarter-Finals
Laois	1-15
Wexford	0-22
Westmeath	2-18
Dublin	7-17

Semi-Finals
Galway	2-20
Wexford	1-19
Kilkenny	4-19
Dublin	3-10

Minor Leinster Final
Galway	1-08
Kilkenny	4-11

==== Leinster Preliminary Quarter-Finals ====
3 May 2025 Preliminary quarter-final	Laois	7-23 - 0-13	Offaly	Laois Hire O'Moore Park
	E Delaney 1-7, D Jones 3-1, T Og Phelan 1-6 (4f), C Headen 1-3, D Downey 1-0, M Cunningham 0-2, T Mahony, D Whelan, LJ Cuddy, O Gilligan 0-1 each.	Report	O Fletcher 0-10 (8f), S Finlay, M Mitchell and E Carty 0-1 each.

3 May 2025 Preliminary quarter-final	Westmeath	1-19 - 0-11	Carlow	Joristown Park
	C Williams 1-14, P Monaghan 1-3, C Maleady 0-1, F Higgins 0-1.	Report	T Sheehan 0-9, J Brennan 0-1.

==== Leinster Quarter-Finals ====
10 May 2025 Quarter-final	Laois	1-15 - 0-22	Wexford	Laois Hire O'Moore Park
	T Óg Phelan 0-7, C Headen 1-1, E Delaney 0-4, T Mahony 0-1, D Carroll 0-1, LJ Cuddy 0-1.	Report	S O'Brien 0-12(0-7f), E Kinsella 0-2, J Kennedy 0-2, J Sheridan 0-1, D Ryan 0-1, J Downey 0-1, E Whelan 0-1, L Cloke 0-1, J Tobin 0-1.

10 May 2025 Quarter-final	Westmeath	2-18 - 7-17	Dublin	Joristown Park
	C Williams 1-10 (1-10f); M Devine 1-1; B Burke 0-3; C O’Meara 0-2; MJ Long, S Byrne 0-1 apiece.	Report	S Culleton 3-2; C O’Sullivan 2-2; R Flannery 1-4 (0-3f, 0-1 ‘65’); C Kane 1-0; L Hayes 0-3; C Kelly 0-2; R Hession, C Fitzgerald, C Condon, R Duffy 0-1 apiece.Westmeath:

==== Leinster Semi-Finals ====
17 May 2025 Semi-final	Kilkenny	4-19 - 3-10	Dublin	UPMC Nowlan Park
	R Flannery 1-6 (1-0pen, 0-5f); C O’Sullivan 1-1; S Culleton 1-0; C Mac Canna, C Fitzgerald, R Hession 0-1 apiece.	Report	C Byrne 3-3; J Mullen 1-9 (0-7f); K Buggy 0-2; E Brennan, O Henderson, D Behan, O O’Donovan, B Hickey 0-1 apiece.

18 May 2025 Semi-final	Galway	2-20 - 0-19	Wexford	Laois Hire O'Moore Park
	C Roche 1-4 (0-2f), J Shaughnessy 1-2 (0-1f), R Cahalan 0-4, T Mac Cárthaigh (0-3), S Brady 0-1, R Burke 0-1, S Moran 0-1, C Hannon 0-1, G Lohan 0-1, S Keane 0-1, S Glennon 0-1.	Report	D Ryan 0-11(0-7f, 0-1'65), J Tobin 0-4 (0-2f), J Downey 0-1, J Kennedy 0-1, E Kinsella 0-1, J Sheridan 0-1.

==== Leinster Final ====
24 May 2025 Final	Kilkenny	4-11 - 1-08	Galway	Laois Hire O'Moore Park
17:15	J Mullen 1-4, C Byrne 1-2, O O'Donovan 1-2, D Behan 1-0, E Brennan 0-1, B Nevin 0-1, K Buggy 0-1.	Report		Referee: P Dunne (Laois)

== Munster Minor Hurling Championship ==
=== Munster Group Stage ===
==== Munster Group Stage Table ====
Advance to Munster final and All-Ireland series Advance to All-Ireland preliminary quarter-finals

Team	Matches				Score			Pts
Team	Pld	W	D	L	For	Against	Diff	Pts
Cork	4	4	0	0	111	80	31	8
Waterford	4	3	0	1	84	73	11	6
Clare	4	2	0	2	90	93	-3	4
Limerick	4	1	0	3	72	98	-26	2
Tipperary	4	0	0	4	68	81	-13	0

==== Munster Group Stage Results ====
28 March 2025 Round 1	Limerick	0-21 - 2-25	Cork	TUS Gaelic Grounds
	S Waters 0-11 (0-7 f), C Dennehy, P Murphy 0-3 each, D Sheehan, R Hanley, A Kerins (0-1 f), S Óg Cahill Hayes 0-1 each.	Report	C Deane 1-4, C O’Sullivan 0-6 (0-2 f), R Dineen, E O’Shea 0-4 each, MT Brosnan 0-3, R Donovan 1-0, D Heavin, C Garde, S Coughlan, TA Walsh 0-1 each.	Referee: A Hogg (Clare)

28 March 2025 Round 1	Tipperary	0-17 - 1-16	Waterford	FBD Semple Stadium
	J Cahill 0-7 (5fs, 1 65), E Murray 0-4, K Rossiter 0-2, C Morrisson, P Cummins, P McCormack (f), D Hennessy 0-1 each.	Report	C Spain 1-9 (5fs), G O’Shea, J Shanahan 0-2 each, C Reville, S Power, C Power 0-1 each.	Referee: K Guina (Limerick)

4 April 2025 Round 2	Waterford	1-20 - 0-14	Limerick	Cappoquin Logistics Fraher Field
	C Spain 1-13 (0-10 frees); G O’Shea 0-3; J Shanahan, S Power 0-2 each.	Report	S Waters 0-8 (0-7 frees; 0-1 ‘65); P Murphy, D O’Keeffe, K Begley, R Hanly, C Dennehy, G O’Brien 0-1 each.

5 April 2025 Round 2	Clare	1-17 - 2-12	Tipperary	Zimmer Biomet Páirc Uí Chíosóg
	J Barry 0-14 (12f); E Cleary 1-0; Zak Phelan, G Marshall, G Ball 0-1 each	Report	C Dunne 1-3; J Cahill 0-3 (3f); T O’Meara 1-0; J Cilvinas, C Morrisson 0-2 each; D Hennessy, P Cummins 0-1 each

12 April 2025 Round 3	Clare	3-17 - 3-24	Cork	Páirc an Dálaigh
	J Barry 1-5 (3fs), L Murphy 2-2, P Rodgers 0-5 (1f), Z Phelan 0-2, I O’Brien, C Daly, J Gibbons 0-1 each.	Report	C O’Sullivan (0-14, 6f, 2’65), C Coffey 3-1, C Deane 0-3, E O’Shea 0-2, MT Brosnan, R Dineen, TA Walsh, E Connolly 0-1 each.

18 April 2025 Round 3	Tipperary	0-18 - 2-13	Limerick	FBD Semple Stadium
	C Dunne 0-9 (0-5 frees), C Morrisson, E Murray 0-2 each, D Hennessy, J Cilvinas, Z O'Keeffe, C Kennedy 0-1 each.	Report	S Waters 0-7 (all frees), K Begley 1-1, R Horgan 1-0, C Dennehy 0-3, D O'Keeffe, R Hany 0-1 each.

25 April 2025 Round 4	Limerick	0-18 - 2-20	Clare	TUS Gaelic Grounds
	P Murphy 0-6 (6f), C Dennehy and S Waters (2f, 1’65) 0-4 each, D Crowe 0-2 (1 f, 1 ’65), R Hanly and R Horgan 0-1 each.	Report	P Rodgers 1-10 (9f), I O’Brien 1-5, J Barry and D Kennedy 0-2 each, L Murphy 0-1.

25 April 2025 Round 4	Cork	1-21 - 1-15	Waterford	Páirc Uí Rinn
	C O’Sullivan 0-9 (0-8 f, 0-1 65), C Deane 0-8, C Garde 1-0, R Donovan 0-2, E O’Shea, J Counihan 0-1 each.	Report	J Shanahan 1-3, C Spain 0-6 (0-4 f), J Power 0-3, S Power 0-2, A Power 0-1.

2 May 2025 Round 5	Cork	2-17 - 1-12	Tipperary	Páirc Uí Rinn
	C O’Sullivan 0-10 (0-4 f), S Ring, S Coughlan 1-1 each, E O’Shea 0-3, C Deane, R Donovan 0-1 each.	Report	C Dunne 0-4 (0-1 f, 0-1 65), T O’Meara 1-0, E Murray, H Lawlor 0-2 each, C Morrisson, S Mackey, P O’Dwyer, J Cahill 0-1 each.

2 May 2025 Round 5	Waterford	1-21 - 1-15	Clare	Cappoquin Logistics Fraher Field
	C Spain 1-12 (1-8fs, 1 65), S Power, J Shanahan, G O'Shea 0-2 each, P Quann, C Reville, D Murphy 0-1 each.	Report	P Rodgers 1-8 (6fs, 1 65), J Barry 0-2, E Cleary, D Kennedy, L Murphy, I O'Brien, J Gibbons 0-1 each.

=== Munster Final ===
16 May 2025 Final	Cork	1-20 - 2-15	Waterford	FBD Semple Stadium
	C O’Sullivan 0-8 (0-3 f), TA Walsh 0-3, S Ring 1-0, R Donovan, E O’Shea, C Deane, R Dineen 0-2 each, S Coughlan 0-1.	Report	C Spain 2-10 (1-7 f), D Murphy 0-2, S Power, H Quann, J Zeljkovic 0-1.	Referee: C O'Donovan (Tipperary)

== All-Ireland Minor Hurling Championship ==
=== Bracket ===
Preliminary Quarter-Finals
Wexford	0-15
Limerick	1-20
Clare	2-20
Dublin	0-13

Quarter-Finals
Waterford	1-18
Limerick	1-14
Galway	2-13
Clare	2-21

Semi-Finals
Kilkenny	2-18
Waterford	2-21
Cork	1-22
Clare	0-27

All-Ireland Minor Hurling Final
Waterford
Clare

=== All-Ireland preliminary quarter-finals ===
24 May 2025 Preliminary Quarter-Final	Clare	2-20 - 0-13	Dublin	FBD Semple Stadium
14:00	P Rodgers 0-13 (8fs, 1 65), L Murphy 1-1, B Talty 1-0; D Kennedy, C Daly, E Cleary, R Ralph, J O’Donnell, I O’Brien 0-1 each.	Report	R Flannery 0-9 (7s), S Culleton 0-2, C Kelly, C O’Sullivan 0-1 each.	Referee: C Doyle

24 May 2025 Preliminary Quarter-Final	Wexford	0-15 - 1-20	Limerick	FBD Semple Stadium
16:00	D Ryan 0-7 (5fs, 1 65), S O’Brien 0-4 (3fs), T Fenlon 0-2, É Quinlan, E Whelan 0-1 each.	Report	S Waters 0-14 (6f, 3 65s), C Hough 1-2, S Carroll, A Kearns, C Dennehy, K Begley 0-1 each.	Referee: C O'Donovan

=== All-Ireland quarter-finals ===
1 June 2025 Quarter-Final	Waterford	1-18 - 1-14	Limerick	FBD Semple Stadium
13:00	C Spain 1-7 (0-5 frees); J Shanahan 0-3; S Power 0-3; H Quann 0-1; B Penkert 0-1; G O’Shea 0-1; D Murphy 0-1; J Power 0-1.	Report	S Waters 0-7 (0-6 frees, 0-1 ’65); C Dennehy 1-1; R Horgan 0-3; A Kearns 0-1; S Carroll 0-1; K Begley 0-1.	Referee: M Farrell (Roscommon)

1 June 2025 Quarter-Final	Galway	2-13 - 2-21	Clare	FBD Semple Stadium
15:00	R Cahalan 1-2; T Mac Cártaigh 1-2; C Roche 0-3 (2f); J Shaughnessy 0-3 (2f); G Lohan 0-2; M Maher 0-1.	Report	P Rodgers 0-11 (0-6f, 0-1 s/l); L Murphy 1-3; I O’Brien 0-4; D Kennedy 0-1; B Talty 0-1; J Barry (free) 0-1.	Referee: N Barry (Waterford)

=== All-Ireland semi-finals ===
14 June 2025 Semi-Final	Kilkenny	2-18 - 2-21	Waterford	Chadwicks Wexford Park
19:35	J Mullen 0-6 (5fs), C Byrne 1-2, A Maher 1-0, K Buggy 0-3, E Brennan 0-2, O O’Donovan 0-2, D Behan 0-1, B Hickey 0-1, C Holohan 0-1.	Report	C Spain 2-6 (5fs), S Power 0-4, J Shanahan 0-3, G O’Shea 0-3, H Quann 0-1, C Reville 0-1, J Power 0-1, D Murphy 0-1, E McHugh 0-1.	Referee: E Furlong (Wexford)

15 June 2025 Semi-Final	Cork	1-22 - 0-27	Clare	FBD Semple Stadium
13:00	C O’Sullivan 0-8 (0-6 f), E O’Shea 0-5, C Deane 1-2, MT Brosnan 0-3 (0-1 f), S Ring 0-2, R Dineen, J Counihan 0-1 each.	Report	P Rodgers 0-13 (0-9 f, 0-1 sl), I O’Brien, B Talty 0-3 each, L Murphy, R Ralph 0-2 each, D Kennedy, E Cleary, J O’Donnell, J Barry 0-1 each.	Referee: C Doyle (Tipperary)

=== All-Ireland final ===
28 June 2025 Final	Waterford	1-18 - 0-10	Clare	FBD Semple Stadium
	C Spain (0-11, 0-7 frees); S Power (0-3); P Quann (1-0); G O’Shea (0-2); T Kennedy, E McHugh (0-1 each).	Report	J Barry (0-3, 0-3 frees); P Rodgers (0-1 free, 0-1 sc), L Murphy (0-2 each); B Talty, I O’Brien, G Ball (free), D Murrihy (0-1 each).	Attendance: 16,411; Referee: C McDonald (Antrim)

== Statistics ==
=== Top Scorers ===
Overall

Rank	Player	County	Tally	Total	Matches	Average
1	Cormac Spain	Waterford	8-74	98	8	12.25
2	Conor Williams	Westmeath	7-66	87	6	14.50
3	Paul Rodgers	Clare	2-62	68	7	9.71
4	Odhran Fletcher	Offaly	3-46	55	5	11.00
4	Craig O'Sullivan	Cork	0-55	55	6	9.16
6	Jake Mullen	Kilkenny	4-41	53	6	8.83
7	Shane Waters	Limerick	0-51	51	6	8.50
8	Sean O'Brien	Wexford	2-41	47	5	9.40
9	Eoin Delaney	Laois	6-21	39	5	7.80
10	Rory Flannery	Dublin	1-34	37	5	7.40

In A Single Game

Rank	Player	Club	Tally	Total	Opposition
1	Conor Williams	Westmeath	3-13	22	Wicklow
2	Conor Williams	Westmeath	1-14	17	Carlow
3	Odhran Fletcher	Offaly	2-11	17	Antrim
4	Cormac Spain	Waterford	2-10	16	Cork
4	Sean O'Brien	Wexford	1-13	16	Galway
4	Cormac Spain	Waterford	1-13	16	Limerick
7	Cormac Spain	Waterford	1-12	15	Clare
8	Craig O'Sullivan	Cork	0-14	14	Clare
8	John Barry	Clare	0-14	14	Tipperary
8	Shane Waters	Limerick	0-14	14	Wexford

=== Miscellaneous ===
- Waterford's 1–16 to 0–17 win over Tipperary in the Munster MHC Round 1 was their first win over Tipperary in Semple Stadium since 2009.
