= Darren Ronan =

Irish hurler

Personal information
- Native name: Darin Ó Rónáin (Irish)
- Born: 4 November 1976 (age 49) Ballyhea, County Cork, Ireland
- Height: 5 ft 11 in (180 cm)

Sport
- Sport: Hurling
- Position: Right wing-forward
Club
- Years: Club
- Ballyhea
Club titles
- Cork titles: 0
Inter-county*
Years	County	Apps (scores)
1995–1997	Cork	3 (0-00)
Inter-county titles
- Munster titles: 0
- All-Irelands: 0
- NHL: 0
- All Stars: 0
- *Inter County team apps and scores correct as of 16:27, 8 August 2014.

Darren Ronan (born 4 November 1976) is an Irish hurler who played for the Cork senior team.

Born in Ballyhea, County Cork, Ronan first played competitive hurling whilst at school at Charleville CBS. He arrived on the inter-county scene at the age of seventeen when he first linked up with the Cork minor team, before later joining the under-21 side. He made his senior debut during the 1995 championship.

At club level Ronan has won several divisional championship medals with Ballyhea.

His brother, Neil, is a two-time All-Ireland medallist with Cork.

Ronan left the Cork panel after the 1997 championship.

== Honours ==
=== Team ===
Cork

- All-Ireland Under-21 Hurling Championship (1): 1997
- Munster Under-21 Hurling Championship (3): 1996, 1997
- Munster Minor Hurling Championship (1): 1994
