= Munster Minor Hurling Championship =

Annual hurling competition in Munster, Ireland

- Current season or competition: 2026 Munster Minor Hurling Championship
- Irish: Craobh Iománaíochta Mionúir na Mumhan
- Code: Hurling
- Founded: 1928; 98 years ago
- Region: Munster (GAA)
- Trophy: The John Doyle Cup
- No. of teams: 5
- Title holders: Tipperary (43rd title)
- Most titles: Tipperary (43 titles)
- Sponsors: Electric Ireland
- TV partner: TG4
- Official website: Official website

The Munster GAA Hurling Minor Championship (known for sponsorship reasons as the Electric Ireland Munster GAA Hurling Minor Championship) is an annual inter-county hurling competition organised by the Munster Council of the Gaelic Athletic Association (GAA). It is the highest inter-county hurling competition for male players under the age of 17 in the province of Munster, and has been contested every year since the 1928 championship.

The final serves as the culmination of a series of games played during March and May, where the result determines which team receives the TWA Cup. The championship was previously played on a straight knockout basis whereby once a team lost they were eliminated from the championship, however, as of 2018 the championship will use a round-robin system.

The Munster Championship is an integral part of the wider GAA Hurling All-Ireland Minor Championship. The Munster finalists, like their counterparts in the Leinster Championship, are rewarded by advancing directly to the semi-final stage of the All-Ireland series of games. The Munster winners play the Leinster runners up and Leinster winners play the Munster runners up in the semi finals.

Five teams currently participate in the Munster Championship. Two of the most successful teams in the championship, namely Cork and Tipperary, play their provincial hurling in the Munster Championship. Between them, these teams have won the provincial title on 72 occasions while they have also claimed 38 All-Ireland titles.

The title has been won at least once by all six of the Munster counties, five of which have won the title more than once. The all-time record-holders are Tipperary, who have won the competition 39 times. Tipperary are the current champions.

== History ==
=== Development ===
Since 1887 the Munster Senior Championship had provided inter-county games for adult males. This was supplemented by the creation of the Munster Junior Championship in 1910 which provided a springboard to develop players before progressing to senior level. The Munster Minor Championship was the third championship to be created and was aimed at developing younger players who were under the age of 18.

=== Beginnings ===
The inaugural Munster Championship featured Clare, Cork, Limerick, Tipperary and Waterford. Limerick and Waterford contested the first match on Sunday 15 July 1928. Played in Thurles Sportsfield as the curtain raiser to the senior final, Waterford claimed a seven-point victory in the inaugural game. Even though there were only four games down for decision, the championship took nearly 11 months to complete. On Sunday 2 June 1929, the very first Munster final took place. Cork won their first title after a 3-04 to 3-02 defeat of Waterford. Since then the championship title has been awarded every year except for a three-year period during the Emergency.

=== Team changes ===
Due to a lack of competition in the various Connacht Championships, a proposal by the Galway County Board led to a wider debate regarding hurling. At a meeting of the Munster Council on 10 January 1959 it was decided to invite Galway to participate in all grades of hurling in Munster on a temporary basis. This decision was later ratified at the GAA Congress. Galway played in the Munster Championship from 1959 until 1969 and reached the 1966 final where they lost to Cork.

=== Format ===
Between 1928 and 2002 the Munster Championship was a knockout tournament whereby once a team was defeated they were eliminated from the championship. In the early years the pairings were drawn at random and there was no seeding. Each match was played as a single leg. If a match ended in a draw there was a replay. Drawn replays were settled with extra time; however, if both sides were still level at the end of extra time a second replay took place and so on until a winner was found. Extra-time was eventually adopted in the event of a draw for all championship games except the final. In 2003 a play-off format was adopted which gave the defeated first-round teams a second chance to progress to the semi-finals.

The Munster Championship was an integral part of the All-Ireland Senior Hurling Championship. Between 1928 and 1996 the Munster final winners automatically qualified for either the All-Ireland semi-final or final. The introduction of the "back door" system in 1997 allowed the defeated Munster finalists access to the All-Ireland quarter-final, while the Munster champions received a bye to the All-Ireland semi-final.

== Current format ==
=== Championship ===
There are five teams in the Munster Championship. During the course of a season (from May to June) each team plays the others once (a single round-robin system) for a total of 10 games. Teams receive two points for a win and one point for a draw. No points are awarded for a loss. Teams are ranked by total points and then head-to-head results. The top two teams in the group contest the Munster final.

=== Qualification for the All-Ireland Championship ===
As of the 2018 championship qualification for the All-Ireland Championship has changed due to the introduction of a quarter-final group stage The Munster champions continue to receive a bye to the All-Ireland semi-final while the defeated Munster finalists enter the All-Ireland quarter-finals.

== Venues ==
=== Group stage ===
Fixtures in the five group stage rounds of the championship are played at the home ground of one of the two teams. Each team is guaranteed two home games. These games will be played as curtain raisers to their corresponding senior fixtures.

=== Final ===
The final has historically been played at either Semple Stadium, Páirc Uí Chaoimh or the Gaelic Grounds. As of the 2018 championship, the final will be played at one of these venues as per the home and away agreements between Cork, Limerick and Tipperary at senior level.

== Managers ==
Managers in the Munster Championship are involved in the day-to-day running of the team, including the training, team selection, and sourcing of players from the club championships. Their influence varies from county-to-county and is related to the individual county boards. The manager is assisted by a team of two or three selectors and an extensive backroom team consisting of various coaches. Prior to the development of the concept of a manager in the 1970s, teams were usually managed by a team of selectors with one member acting as chairman.

Winning managers (1993–present)
Manager	Team	Wins	Winning years
Paddy McCormack	Tipperary	3	2001, 2002, 2003
James Woodlock	Tipperary	3	2022, 2024, 2026
Denis Ring	Cork	3	2004, 2005, 2017
Jimmy Barry-Murphy	Cork	2	1994, 1995
Dinny Cahill	Tipperary	2	1996, 1997
Gerry O'Connor	Clare	2	2010, 2011
Brian Ryan	Limerick	2	2013, 2014
Liam Cahill	Tipperary	2	2015, 2016
Diarmuid Mullins	Limerick	2	2019, 2020
Tom Fogarty	Tipperary	1	1993
Denis Burns	Cork	1	1998
Paudie Butler	Tipperary	1	1999
John Considine	Cork	1	2000
Ger FitzGerald	Cork	1	2006
Declan Ryan	Tipperary	1	2007
Ger Manley	Cork	1	2008
Jimmy Meaney	Waterford	1	2009
William Maher	Tipperary	1	2012
Tommy Dunne	Tipperary	1	2018
Noel Furlong	Cork	1	2021

== Trophy and medals ==
Between 1928 and 1945, several cups and trophies were presented to the winning captains. The TWA Cup was presented by Trans World Airlines at Shannon Airport in 1946 and was used until it was retired in 2023. Following a proposal from the Tipperary County Board, the Munster Council approved the commissioning of the John Doyle Cup in 2024.

Traditionally, the victory presentation takes place at a special rostrum in the main grandstand. The cup is decorated with ribbons in the colours of the winning team. During the game the cup actually has both teams' sets of ribbons attached and the runners-up ribbons are removed before the presentation. The winning captain accepts the cup on behalf of his team before giving a short speech. Individual members of the winning team then have an opportunity to come to the rostrum to lift the cup, which is held by the winning team until the following year's final.

In accordance with GAA rules, the Munster Council awards up to twenty-six gold medals to the winners of the Munster final.

== General statistics ==
=== Performance by county ===
	County	Wins	Years won	Runners-up	Years runner-up
1	Tipperary	43	1930, 1931, 1932, 1933, 1934, 1935, 1945, 1946, 1947, 1949, 1950, 1952, 1953, 1954, 1955, 1956, 1957, 1959, 1960, 1961, 1962, 1973, 1976, 1980, 1982, 1983, 1987, 1991, 1993, 1996, 1997, 1999, 2001, 2002, 2003, 2007, 2012, 2015, 2016, 2018, 2022, 2024, 2026	23	1929, 1936, 1941, 1948, 1963, 1964, 1965, 1969, 1970, 1974, 1975, 1978, 1981, 1984, 1985, 1986, 1988, 1992, 2004, 2006, 2008, 2009, 2020
2	Cork	35	1928, 1936, 1937, 1938, 1939, 1941, 1951, 1964, 1966, 1967, 1968, 1969, 1970, 1971, 1972, 1974, 1975, 1977, 1978, 1979, 1985, 1986, 1988, 1990, 1994, 1995, 1998, 2000, 2004, 2005, 2006, 2008, 2017, 2021, 2025	13	1930, 1933, 1935, 1946, 1961, 1962, 1987, 1993, 2001, 2002, 2003, 2007, 2023
3	Limerick	9	1940, 1958, 1963, 1965, 1984, 2013, 2014, 2019, 2020	23	1937, 1951, 1953, 1954, 1957, 1959, 1967, 1972, 1973, 1976, 1977, 1979, 1980, 1982, 1983, 1989, 1991, 2000, 2005, 2015, 2016, 2018, 2026
4	Clare	5	1981, 1989, 2010, 2011, 2023	17	1932, 1939, 1940, 1945, 1949, 1950, 1952, 1971, 1990, 1997, 1998 1999, 2012, 2017, 2019, 2022, 2024
5	Waterford	4	1929, 1948, 1992, 2009	17	1928, 1931, 1934, 1947, 1955, 1956, 1958, 1968, 1994, 1995, 1996, 2010, 2011, 2013, 2014, 2021, 2025
6	Kerry	0		1	1938

=== Biggest Munster final wins ===
- The most one sided Munster finals:
  - 33 points – 1950: Tipperary 12–3 (39) – (6) 2–0 Clare
  - 32 points – 1952: Tipperary 10–7 (37) – (5) 1–2 Clare
  - 32 points – 1945: Tipperary 8–10 (34) – (2) 0–2 Clare
  - 31 points – 1938: Cork 9–4 (31) – (0) 0–0 Kerry
  - 25 points – 1939: Cork 8–3 (27) – (2) 0–2 Clare
  - 24 points – 1956: Tipperary 10–10 (40) – (16) 4–4 Waterford
  - 24 points – 1955: Tipperary 8–11 (35) – (11) 2–5 Waterford
  - 24 points – 1929: Waterford 7–5 (26) – (2) 0–2 Tipperary
  - 23 points – 1961: Tipperary 7–11 (32) – (9) 1–9 Cork
  - 23 points – 1940: Limerick 8–3 (27) – (4) 0–4 Clare

== List of Munster Finals ==
All-Ireland champions
All-Ireland runners-up

Year	Winners	Score	Runners-up	Score	Venue	Winning captain
1928	Cork	3–04	Waterford	3–02	Gaelic Grounds	Chris Duggan
1929	Waterford	7–05	Tipperary	0–02	Fraher Field	Paddy Donnelly
1930	Tipperary	4–03	Cork	3–00	The Mardyke	Jack Russell
1931	Tipperary	6–05	Waterford	6–03	Clonmel Sportsfield	William O'Neill
1932	Tipperary	7–08	Clare	3–00	Thurles Sportsfield	Denis O'Gorman
1933	Tipperary	3–01	Cork	2–02	Cork Athletic Grounds	Joe Fletcher
1934	Tipperary	3–06	Waterford	0–05	Cork Athletic Grounds	Phil Dwyer
1935	Tipperary	4–03	Cork	2–01	Cork Athletic Grounds	Con Maher
1936	Cork	6–05	Tipperary	1–04	Mitchelstown Sportsfield	
1937	Cork	8–04	Limerick	3–02	Cork Athletic Grounds	Mick Goggin
1938	Cork	9–03	Kerry	0–00	Cork Athletic Grounds	Kevin McGrath
1939	Cork	8–03	Clare	0–02	Thurles Sportsfield	Teddy Barry
1940	Limerick	8–03	Clare	0–04	Thurles Sportsfield	Paddy McCarthy
1941	Cork	4–06	Tipperary	3–03	Gaelic Grounds	Seán Condon
1942–44	No championship due to the Emergency.					
1945	Tipperary	8–10	Clare	0–02	Thurles Sportsfield	Pat Stakelum
1946	Tipperary	5–06	Cork	4–02	Thurles Sportsfield	Paddy Kenny
1947	Tipperary	2–04	Waterford	1–02	Thurles Sportsfield	Paddy Kenny
1948	Waterford	3–06	Tipperary	0–03	Thurles Sportsfield	Mick Flannelly
1949	Tipperary	5–06	Clare	5–05	Cork Athletic Grounds	John O'Grady
1950	Tipperary	12–03	Clare	2–00	FitzGerald Stadium	Gerry Doyle
1951	Cork	5–11	Limerick	1–03	Gaelic Grounds	Johnny Clifford
1952	Tipperary	10–07	Clare	1–02	Gaelic Grounds	Tony Wall
1953	Tipperary	3–11	Limerick	3–03	Gaelic Grounds	Billy Quinn
1954	Tipperary	3–05	Limerick	2–03	Gaelic Grounds	Larry Quinn
1955	Tipperary	8–11	Waterford	2–05	Gaelic Grounds	Ray Reidy
1956	Tipperary	10–10	Waterford	4–04	Thurles Sportsfield	Pat Ryan
1957	Tipperary	3–08	Limerick	1–04	Thurles Sportsfield	Jimmy Doyle
1958	Limerick	8–09	Waterford	2–05	Thurles Sportsfield	Paddy Cobbe
1959	Tipperary	5–08	Limerick	1–04	Thurles Sportsfield	Larry Kiely
1960	Tipperary	6–07	Cork	4–03	Thurles Sportsfield	John O'Donoghue
1961	Tipperary	7–11	Cork	1–06	Gaelic Grounds	Noel Hogan
1962	Tipperary	4–11	Cork	4–01	Gaelic Grounds	Michael 'Babs' Keating
1963	Limerick	4–12	Tipperary	5–04	Gaelic Grounds	Éamonn Cregan
1964	Cork	2–14	Tipperary	2–09	Gaelic Grounds	Kevin Cummins
1965	Limerick	5–05	Tipperary	3–09	Gaelic Grounds	Michael O'Flaherty
1966	Cork	6–07	Galway	2–08	Gaelic Grounds	
1967	Cork	4–10	Limerick	0–03	Gaelic Grounds	Pat Moylan
1968	Cork	7–08	Waterford	4–02	Gaelic Grounds	Denis McCarthy
1969	Cork	1–12	Tipperary	2–04	Gaelic Grounds	Seán Collins
1970	Cork	3–08	Tipperary	4–04	Gaelic Grounds	Pat Kavanagh
1971	Cork	6–13	Clare	3–05	FitzGerald Stadium	Séamus Coughlan
1972	Cork	4–11	Limerick	0–03	Semple Stadium	
1973	Tipperary	5–12	Limerick	5–04	Semple Stadium	Michael McCormack
1974	Cork	2–11	Tipperary	2–07	Fraher Field	Billy Geaney
1975	Cork	3–16	Tipperary	1–07	Gaelic Grounds	Tom Cashman
1976	Tipperary	5–10	Limerick	5–06	Páirc Uí Chaoimh	Joe Hogan
1977	Cork	2–08	Limerick	2–07	Semple Stadium	S. Hayes
1978	Cork	1–14	Tipperary	3–06	Semple Stadium	Pat Murphy
1979	Cork	3–17	Limerick	4–04	Semple Stadium	Christy Coughlan
1980	Tipperary	1–17	Limerick	1–04	Semple Stadium	Jim Maher
1981	Clare	3–13	Tipperary	3–11	Semple Stadium	John Lynch
1982	Tipperary	1–10	Limerick	1–07	Semple Stadium	John Kennedy
1983	Tipperary	3–15	Limerick	2–08	Semple Stadium	P. J. Lanigan
1984	Limerick	3–06 (	Tipperary	2–07	Semple Stadium	Anthony O'Riordan
1985	Cork	1–13	Tipperary	1–08	Páirc Uí Chaoimh	Michael O'Mahony
1986	Cork	2–11	Tipperary	1–11	FitzGerald Park	Kieran Keane
1987	Tipperary	2–11	Cork	1–09	Semple Stadium	Michael O'Meara
1988	Cork	5–07	Limerick	1–02	Gaelic Grounds	K. O'Brien
1989	Clare	2–13	Limerick	2–12	Páirc Uí Chaoimh	Pat Lee
1990	Cork	1–09	Clare	0–09	Semple Stadium	Peter Smith
1991	Tipperary	4–07	Limerick	1–05	Páirc Uí Chaoimh	Adrian Hogan
1992	Waterford	2–10	Tipperary	0–14	Páirc Uí Chaoimh	Paddy O'Donnell
1993	Tipperary	1–12	Cork	1–09 (12)	Gaelic Grounds	Kevin Tucker
1994	Cork	2–15	Waterford	0–09	Semple Stadium	Brian Hurley
1995	Cork	3–18	Waterford	0–10	Semple Stadium	Brian O'Keeffe
1996	Tipperary	2–19	Waterford	1–11	Gaelic Grounds	William Maher
1997	Tipperary	2–13	Clare	1–13	Páirc Uí Chaoimh	Donnacha Fahy
1998	Cork	3–13	Clare	0–08	Semple Stadium	Cathal McCarthy
1999	Tipperary	1–13	Clare	2-07	Semple Stadium	Damien Young
2000	Cork	2–19	Limerick	1–10	Semple Stadium	Mark O'Connor
2001	Tipperary	1–13	Cork	1–06	Páirc Uí Chaoimh	Diarmaid FitzGerald
2002	Tipperary	3–07	Cork	2–07	Páirc Uí Chaoimh	Patrick McCormack
2003	Tipperary	2–12	Cork	0–16	Semple Stadium	David Morrissey
2004	Cork	2–13	Tipperary	3-08	Semple Stadium	Shane O'Neill
2005	Cork	2–18	Limerick	1–12	Páirc Uí Chaoimh	Pa Cronin
2006	Cork	2–20	Tipperary	1–15	Semple Stadium	Patrick Horgan
2007	Tipperary	0–18	Cork	1–11	Semple Stadium	Brendan Maher
2008	Cork	0–19	Tipperary	0–18	Gaelic Grounds	Daniel Roche
2009	Waterford	0–18	Tipperary	1–13	Semple Stadium	Martin O'Neill
2010	Clare	1–16	Waterford	1–11	Semple Stadium	Paul Flanagan
2011	Clare	1–20	Waterford	3–09	Páirc Uí Chaoimh	Tony Kelly
2012	Tipperary	1–16	Clare	1–12	Páirc Uí Chaoimh	Bill Maher
2013	Limerick	1–20	Waterford	4–08	Semple Stadium	Richie English
2014	Limerick	0–24	Waterford	0–18	Semple Stadium	Cian Lynch
2015	Tipperary	0–20	Limerick	0–17	Semple Stadium	Darragh Peters
2016	Tipperary	1–24	Limerick	0–10	Gaelic Grounds	Brian McGrath
2017	Cork	4–21	Clare	0–16	Semple Stadium	Seán O'Leary-Hayes
2018	Tipperary	1–20	Limerick	1–12	Semple Stadium	Johnny Ryan
2019	Limerick	1–17	Clare	1–11	Gaelic Grounds	Michael Keane
2020	Limerick	2–22	Tipperary	0–25	Gaelic Grounds	Adam English
2021	Cork	1–26	Waterford	1–15	Semple Stadium	Ben O'Connor
2022	Tipperary	1-22	Clare	0-25	Gaelic Grounds	Sam O'Farrell
2023	Clare	1-19	Cork	0-15	Semple Stadium	Eoghan Gunning
2024	Tipperary	2-17	Clare	0-16	Gaelic Grounds	Cathal O’Reilly
2025	Cork	1–20	Waterford	2–15	Semple Stadium	Bobby Carroll
2026	Tipperary	3-16	Limerick	0-18	Semple Stadium	Conor Collins

Notes:

- 1974 - The first match ended in a draw: Cork 3-07, Tipperary 2-10.
- 1986 - The first match ended in a draw: Cork 3-10, Tipperary 2-13.
- 1992 - The first match ended in a draw: Waterford 4-07, Tipperary 3-10.
- 2022 - Tipperary won 3-0 on penalties.

== Records and statistics ==
=== Teams ===
==== By decade ====
The most successful team of each decade, judged by number of Munster Minor Hurling Championship titles, is as follows:

- 1920s: 1 each for Cork (1929) and Waterford (1929)
- 1930s: 6 for Tipperary (1930-31-32-33-34-35)
- 1940s: 4 for Tipperary (1945-46-47-49)
- 1950s: 8 for Tipperary (1950-52-53-54-55-56-57-59)
- 1960s: 5 for Cork (1964-66-67-68-69)
- 1970s: 8 for Cork (1970-71-72-74-75-77-78-79)
- 1980s: 4 for Tipperary (1980-82-83-87)
- 1990s: 5 for Tipperary (1991-93-96-97-99)
- 2000s: 5 for Cork (2000-04-05-06-08)
- 2010s: 4 for Tipperary (2012-15-16-18)

==== Gaps ====
The longest gaps between successive Munster titles:

- 44 years: Waterford (1948–1992)
- 29 years: Limerick (1984–2013)
- 21 years: Clare (1989–2010)
- 19 years: Waterford (1929–1948)
- 19 years: Limerick (1965–1984)
- 18 years: Limerick (1940–1958)
- 17 years: Waterford (1992–2009)
- 13 years: Cork (1951–1964)
- 11 years: Tipperary (1962–1973)
- 10 years: Tipperary (1935–1945)
- 10 years: Cork (1941–1951)

=== Top scorers ===
==== Overall ====
Year	Name	Team	Score	Total
1982	Michael Scully	Tipperary	2-11	17
1983	Ray Sampson	Limerick	3-10	19
1984	Tom Leamy	Tipperary	4-05	17
1985	Declan McInerney	Clare	3-10	19
1986	Michael Nolan	Tipperary	1-22	25
1987	Donal Lyons	Tipperary	4-02	14
1987	Brian Cunningham	Cork	2-08	14
1988	Brian Cunningham	Cork	2-09	15
1989	P. J. Garvey	Limerick	2-09	15
1990	Damien Fleming	Cork	5-16	31
1991	Ray O'Connell	Cork	1-10	13
1992	Paul Flynn	Waterford	6-15	33
1993	Johnny Enright	Tipperary	1-19	22
1994	Darren Ronan	Cork	2-12	18
1995	Dave Bennett	Waterford	0-16	16
1996	Eugene O'Neill	Tipperary	2-22	28
1996	Ken McGrath	Waterford	1-25	28
1997	Paddy O'Brien	Tipperary	0-17	17
1998	Eoin McGrath	Waterford	1-12	15
1999	Gareth McPhillips	Clare	1-10	13
2000	Eoin Kelly	Tipperary	2-29	35
2001	Kieran Murphy	Cork	1-21	24
2002	Pat Shortt	Tipperary	4-14	26
2003	Bernard Gaffney	Clare	3-10	19
2003	Richie Ruth	Tipperary	2-13	19
2004	Bernard Gaffney	Clare	3-20	29
2004	Darragh Hickey	Tipperary	3-20	29
2005	Eoin Ryan	Limerick	3-24	33
2006	Patrick Horgan	Cork	0-16	16
2007	Ryan Clifford	Cork	3-17	26
2008	Simon O'Brien	Cork	1-22	25
2009	John O'Dwyer	Tipperary	3-29	38
2010	Niall Arthur	Clare	0-40	40
2011	Liam McGrath	Tipperary	0-26	26
2012	Bobby Duggan	Clare	2-35	41
2013	Patrick Curran	Waterford	0-37	37
2014	Aron Shanagher	Clare	6-28	46
2015	Peter Casey	Limerick	1-27	30
2016	Lyndon Fairbrother	Tipperary	0-29	29
2017	Brian Turnbull	Cork	0-33	33
2018	Cathal O'Neill	Limerick	1-38	41
2019	Cathal O'Neill	Limerick	1-43	46
2020	Jack Leamy	Tipperary	1-16	19
2021	Jack Leahy	Cork	4-34	46
2022	Oisín Whelan	Clare	2-39	45
2023	Marc O'Brien	Clare	3-33	42
2024	Mark O'Brien	Cork	2-32	38
2025	Cormac Spain	Waterford	5-50	65

==== Single game ====
Year	Name	Team	Score	Total
1982	John Beresford	Waterford	3-02	11
1983	Ray Sampson	Limerick	1-06	9
1984	Tom Leamy	Tipperary	3-02	11
1985	Declan McInerney	Clare	3-03	12
1986	Mike Galligan	Limerick	0-11	11
1987	Donal Lyons	Tipperary	2-01	7
1987	Donal Lyons	Tipperary	2-01	7
1987	Brian Cunningham	Cork	1-04	7
1987	Brian Cunningham	Cork	1-04	7
1987	Ciarán Egan	Tipperary	1-04	7
1988	Ken Ralph	Tipperary	1-07	10
1989	P. J. Garvey	Limerick	1-04	7
1989	Tom Fives	Waterford	0-07	7
1989	Paul Keary	Clare	0-07	7
1989	John Fitzgibbon	Limerick	0-07	7
1990	Kevin Murray	Cork	5-02	17
1991	Eoin Farrell	Cork	3-02	11
1992	Paul Flynn	Waterford	3-06	15
1993	Johnny Enright	Tipperary	1-07	10
1994	Darren Ronan	Cork	1-06	9
1995	Dave Bennett	Waterford	0-08	8
1996	Eugene O'Neill	Tipperary	1-11	14
1997	Kevin O'Dwyer	Limerick	0-08	8
1998	Eoin McGrath	Waterford	1-08	11
1999	Gareth McPhillips	Clare	1-07	10
2000	Eoin Kelly	Tipperary	2-11	17
2001	Kieran Murphy	Cork	1-11	14
2002	Pat Shortt	Tipperary	3-07	16
2003	Bernard Gaffney	Clare	2-04	10
2004	Bernard Gaffney	Clare	2-09	15
2004	Darragh Hickey	Tipperary	1-12	15
2005	Eoin Ryan	Limerick	2-07	13
2005	Patrick Cronin	Cork	1-10	13
2006	Michael Ryan	Limerick	2-04	10
2007	Ryan Clifford	Cork	3-04	13
2008	Simon O'Brien	Cork	1-07	10
2009	John O'Dwyer	Tipperary	2-06	12
2010	Pauric Mahony	Waterford	1-13	16
2011	Rob O'Shea	Cork	0-13	13
2012	Bobby Duggan	Clare	1-12	15
2013	Josh Keane	Tipperary	2-09	15
2014	Aron Shanagher	Clare	1-13	16
2015	Peter Casey	Limerick	0-13	13
2016	Eoghan Murray	Waterford	0-11	11
2017	Paul O'Brien	Limerick	0-11	11
2018	Michael Kiely	Waterford	2-05	11
2018	Cathal O'Neill	Limerick	0-11	11
2019	Darragh Flynn	Cork	1-10	13
2019	Cathal O'Neill	Limerick	1-10	13
2020	Jack Leamy	Tipperary	0-10	10
2020	Liam Lynch	Limerick	0-10	10
2021	Jack Leahy	Cork	3-09	18
2022	Ross O'Sullivan	Cork	3-09	18

==== Finals ====
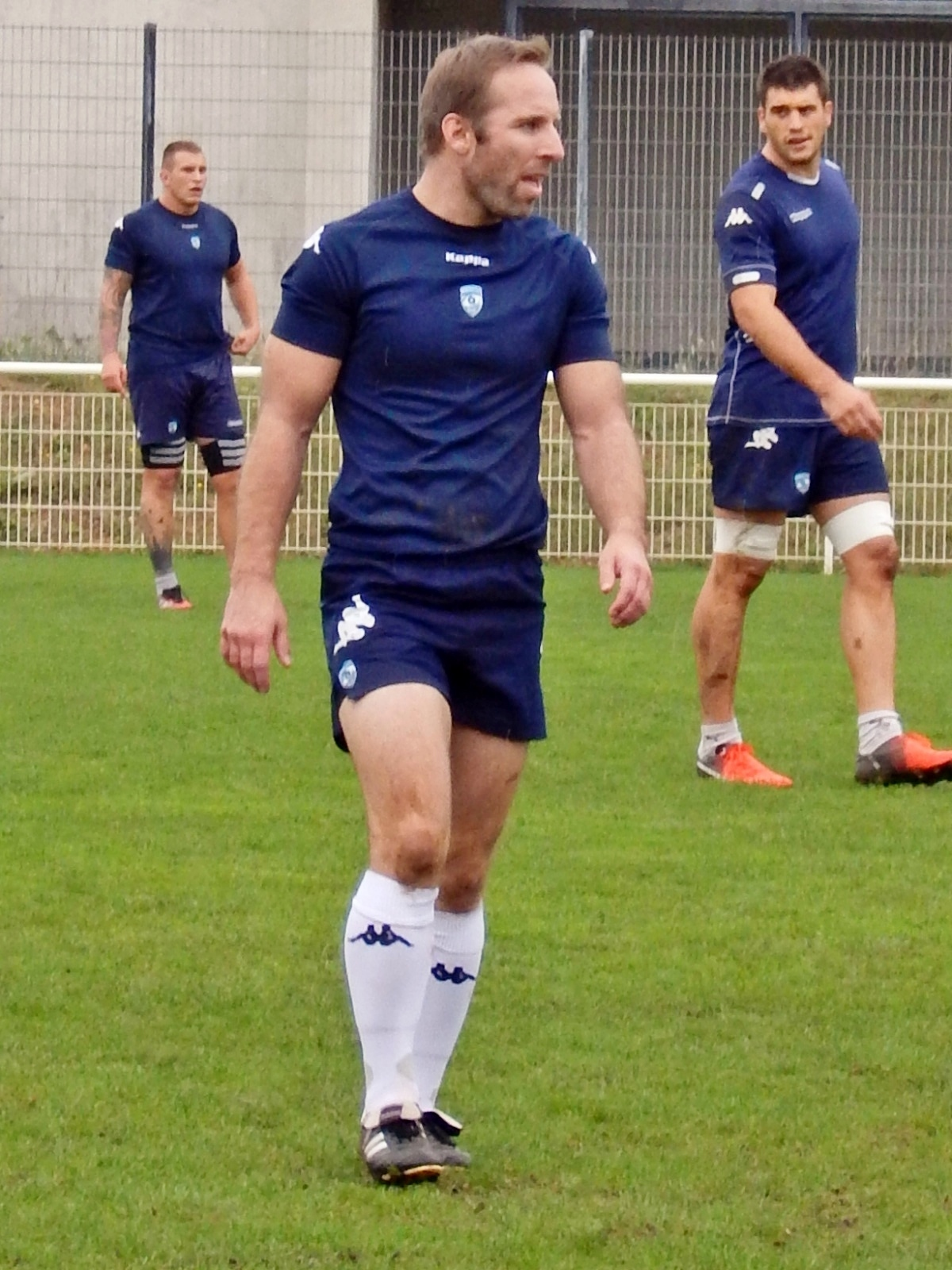
Tomás O'Leary.

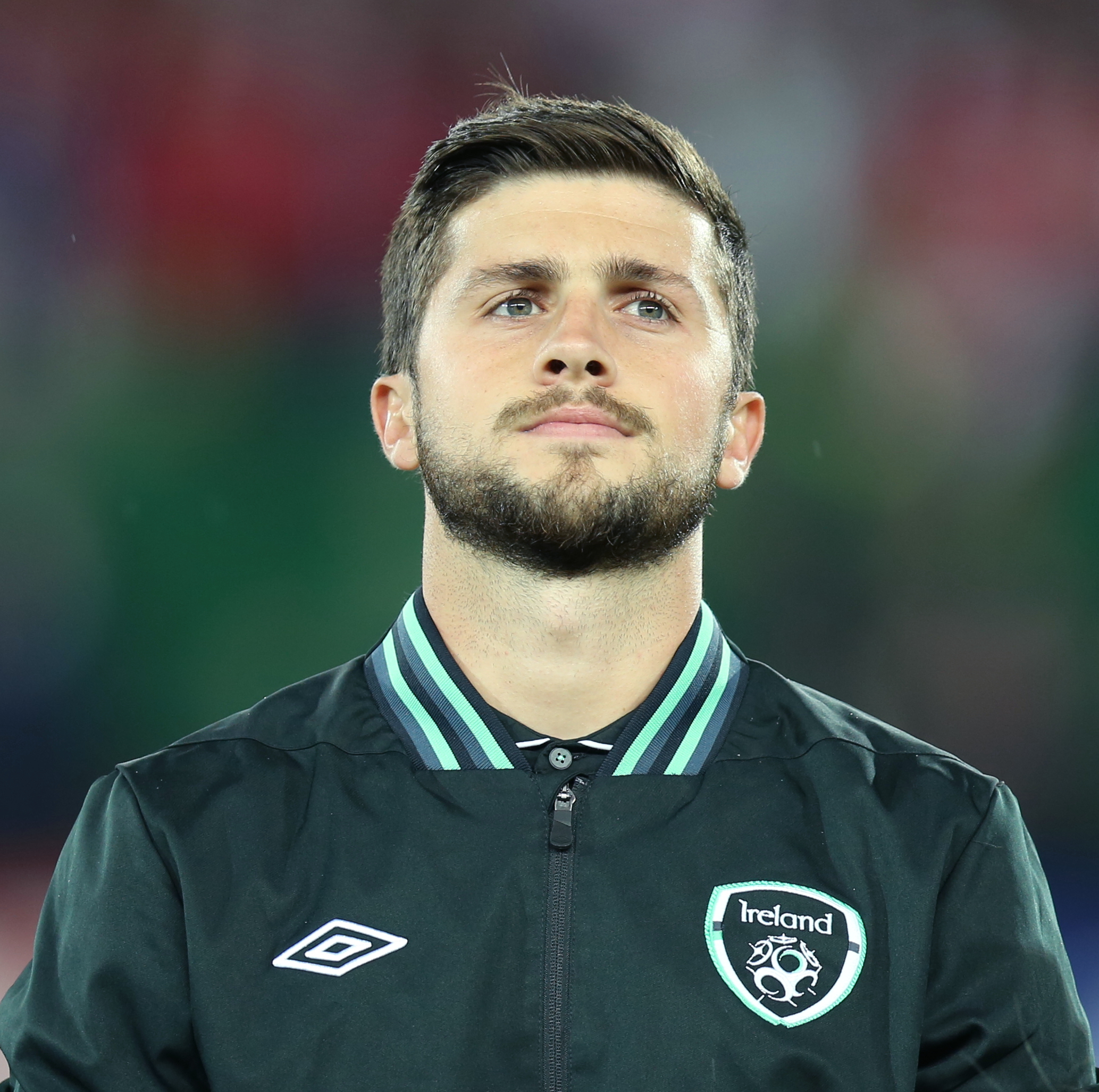
Shane Long.

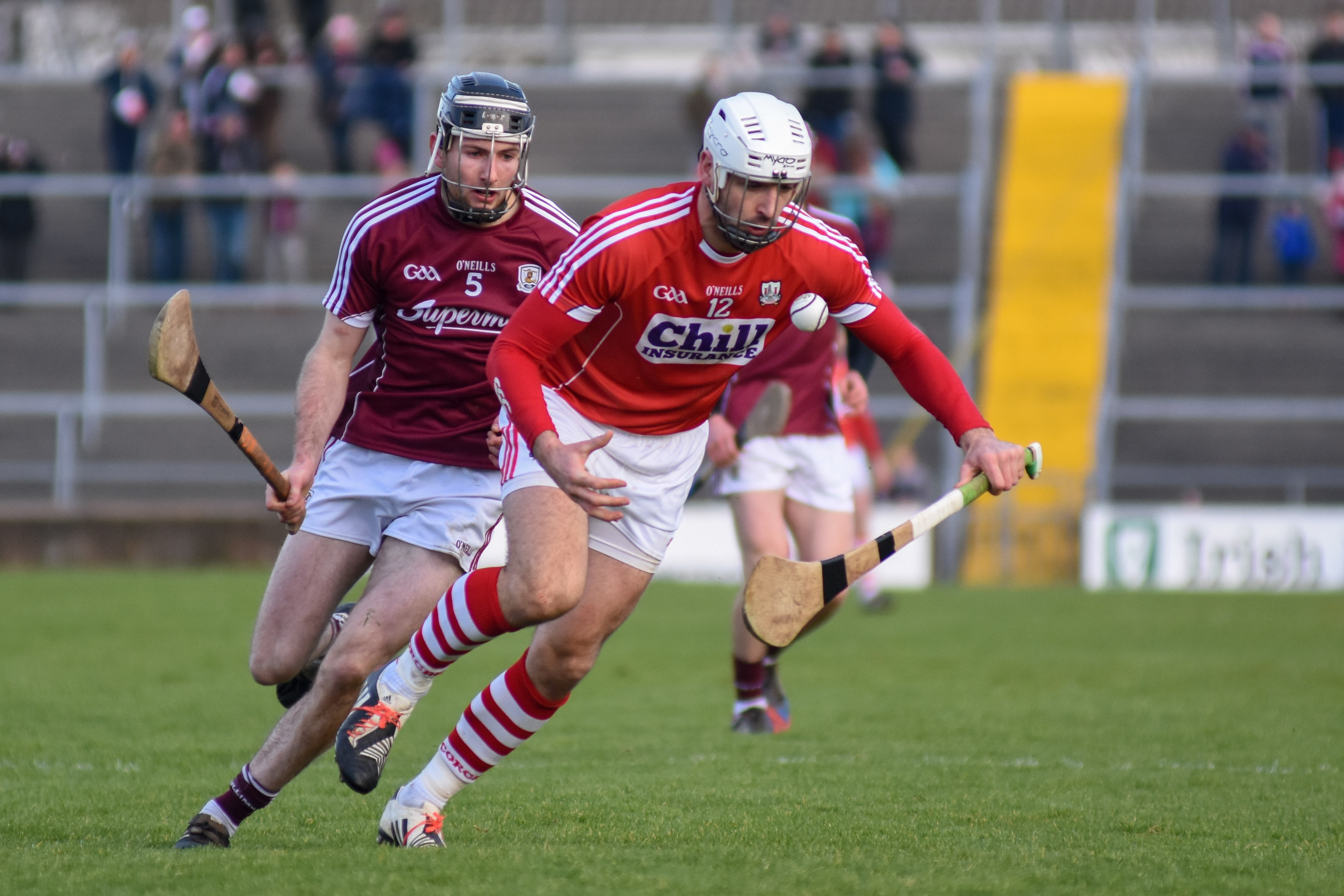
Patrick Cronin.

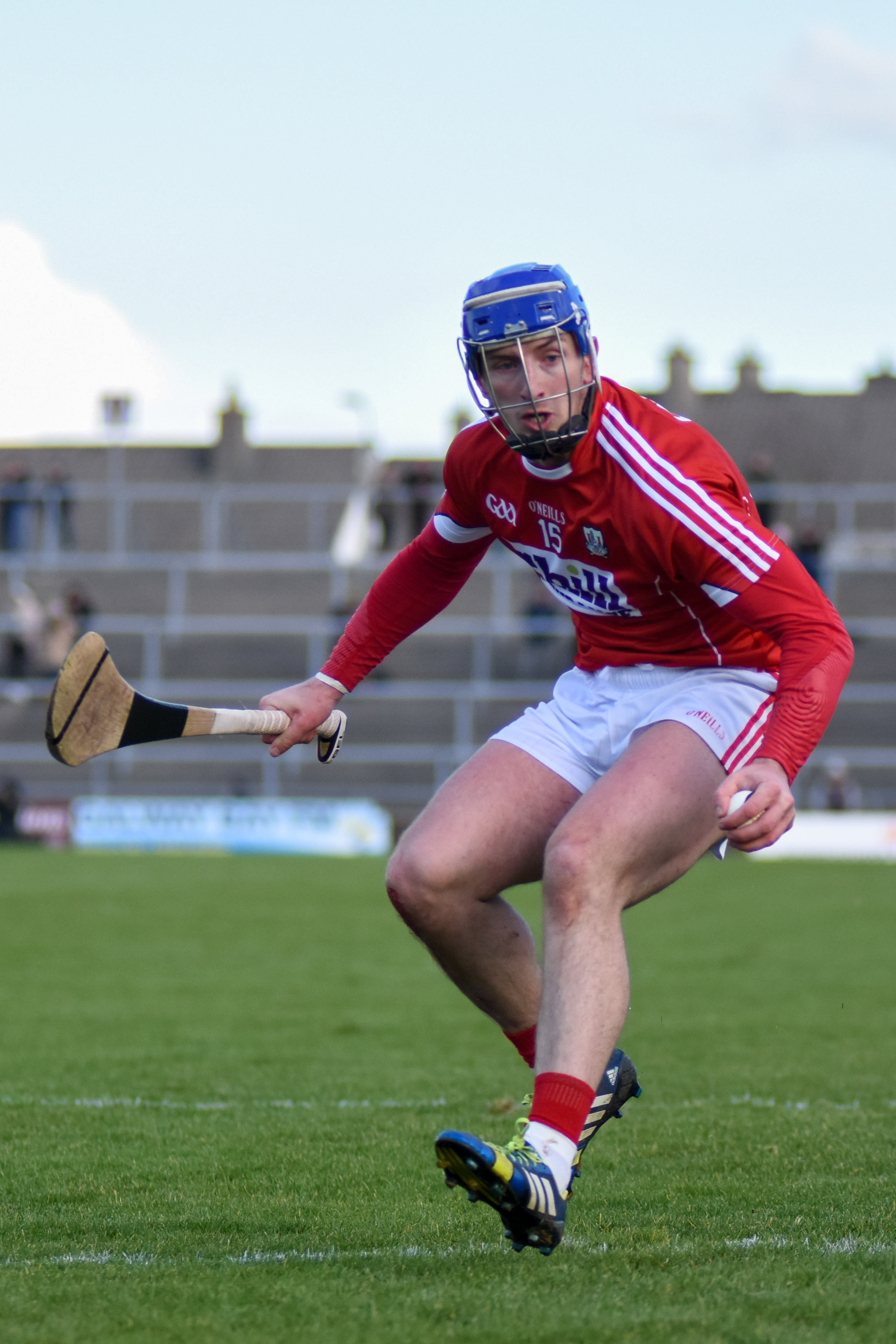
Patrick Horgan.

Year	Name	Team	Score	Total
1957	Jimmy Doyle	Tipperary	1-02	5
1958	Pat Murphy	Limerick	4-04	16
1959	Paddy Doyle	Tipperary	1-04	7
1960	Michael O'Connor	Tipperary	3-01	10
1961	Gerard Ryan	Tipperary	3-00	9
1962	Francis Loughnane	Tipperary	0-07	7
1963	Bernie Savage	Limerick	1-02	5
1963	Francis Loughnane	Tipperary	1-02	5
1964	Charlie McCarthy	Cork	1-09	12
1965	Seán Burke	Limerick	4-00	12
1966	Frank Keane	Cork	2-01	7
1966	Tony Frehill	Galway	2-01	7
1967	Paddy Ring	Cork	1-04	7
1968	Mick Malone	Cork	2-02	8
1969	Joe Cunningham	Tipperary	2-03	9
1970	Seánie O'Leary	Cork	3-02	11
1971	Pat Buckley	Cork	0-06	6
1972	Éamonn O'Sullivan	Cork	3-03	12
1973	Paddy Kelly	Limerick	2-02	8
1974	John Grogan	Cork	2-03	9
1975	John O'Sullivan	Cork	1-06	9
1976	Tom Dunne	Limerick	2-02	8
1977	Seán O'Gorman	Cork	0-05	5
1978	Pat McGrath	Tipperary	2-01	7
1978	Denis Murphy	Cork	1-04	7
1978	John Hartnett	Tipperary	0-07	7
1979	Tony Coyne	Cork	0-09	9
1980	Ger O'Neill	Tipperary	1-03	6
1981	Arthur Browne	Tipperary	2-01	7
1982	Brian Finn	Limerick	0-07	7
1983	Dick Quirke	Tipperary	0-07	7
1984	Tom Leamy	Tipperary	1-03	6
1984	Brian Stapleton	Limerick	1-03	6
1985	Ger Manley	Cork	1-03	6
1986	Michael Nolan	Tipperary	0-09	9
1987	Don Lyons	Tipperary	2-01	7
1987	Brian Cunningham	Cork	1-04	7
1988	Paudie O'Brien	Cork	2-00	6
1988	Brian Cunningham	Cork	1-03	6
1989	John Fitzgibbon	Limerick	0-07	7
1990	Damien Fleming	Cork	1-06	9
1991	Lar Barrett	Tipperary	3-01	10
1992	Paul Flynn	Waterford	3-06	15
1993	Johnny Enright	Tipperary	1-07	10
1994	Darren Ronan	Cork	1-04	7
1995	Mickey O'Connell	Cork	0-07	7
1996	Eugene O'Neill	Tipperary	1-11	14
1997	Paddy O'Brien	Tipperary	0-08	8
1998	Eoin Fitzgerald	Cork	0-08	8
1999	Kevin Cummins	Tipperary	1-03	6
2000	Tomás O'Leary	Cork	0-06	6
2001	Pat Shortt	Tipperary	0-09	9
2002	Trevor Ivors	Tipperary	2-03	9
2003	Shane Long	Tipperary	2-01	7
2004	Shane Long	Tipperary	2-02	8
2005	Patrick Cronin	Cork	1-10	13
2006	Patrick Horgan	Cork	0-07	7
2007	Séamus Hennessy	Tipperary	0-09	9
2008	Simon O'Brien	Cork	0-05	5
2008	Noel McGrath	Tipperary	0-05	5
2009	Martin O'Neill	Waterford	0-10	10
2010	David O'Halloran	Clare	1-03	6
2010	Niall Arthur	Clare	0-06	6
2011	Cathal O'Connell	Clare	0-10	10
2012	John McGrath	Tipperary	0-07	7
2013	Ronan Lynch	Limerick	1-09	12
2014	Ronan Lynch	Limerick	0-10	10
2015	Peter Casey	Limerick	0-13	13
2016	Jake Morris	Tipperary	1-04	7
2016	Lyndon Fairbrother	Tipperary	0-07	7
2017	Brian Turnbull	Cork	0-08	8
2018	James Devaney	Tipperary	0-08	8
2019	Cathal O'Neill	Limerick	0-09	9
2020	Jack Leamy	Tipperary	0-10	10
2020	Liam Lynch	Limerick	0-10	10
2021	Jack Leahy	Cork	0-11	11
2022	Oisín Whelan	Clare	0-09	9
2023	Barry Walsh	Cork	0-09	9

== Sources ==
- Roll of Honour on www.gaainfo.com
- Complete Roll of Honour on Kilkenny GAA bible
