= P. J. Garvey =

Irish hurler and Gaelic footballer (1971–2021)

Personal information
- Born: 1971 Hospital, County Limerick, Ireland
- Died: 24 August 2021 (aged 50) Kilmallock, County Limerick, Ireland

Sport
- Sport: Gaelic football
- Position: Forward
Clubs
- Years: Club
- Hospital-Herbertstown; Ballybricken-Bohermore
Inter-county
- Years: County
- Limerick
Inter-county titles
- Munster titles: 0
- All-Irelands: 0
- NFL: 0
- All Stars: 0

P. J. Garvey (1971 – 24 August 2021) was an Irish hurler and Gaelic footballer. At club level he played with Hospital-Herbertstown and Ballybricken-Bohermore and was also a member of the Limerick senior teams as a dual player.

== Career ==
Garvey played the majority of his adult hurling and Gaelic football with the Hospital-Herbertstown club. He first appeared on the inter-county scene during a two-year stint with the Limerick minor team before progressing onto the under-21 side. Garvey played for the Limerick intermediate hurling team as well as the senior team during the 1992-93 National Hurling League. As a Gaelic footballer he lined out with the Limerick senior team that came close to beating Kerry in the 1991 Munster final. Garvey also enjoyed success as manager of the Mungret/St. Paul's club.

== Death ==
Garvey died suddenly on 24 August 2021.

== Honours ==
Mungret/St. Paul's

- Limerick Junior A Hurling League: 2021
- Limerick City Junior A Hurling League: 2021
