= Jack Leamy =

Irish hurler (born 2003)

Personal information
- Native name: Seán Ó Laomdha (Irish)
- Born: 2003 (age 22–23) Golden; County Tipperary, Ireland
- Occupation: Student

Sport
- Sport: Hurling
- Position: Left corner-forward
Club
- Years: Club
- 2021–present: Golden–Kilfeacle
Club titles
- Tipperary titles: 0
College
- Years: College
- TUS Midwest
Inter-county
- Years: County
- 2026–: Tipperary
Inter-county titles
- Munster titles: 0
- All-Irelands: 0
- NHL: 0
- All Stars: 0

Jack Leamy (born 2003) is an Irish hurler. At club level he plays with Golden–Kilfeacle and at inter-county level with the Tipperary senior hurling team.

== Career ==
Leamu played hurling at all grades, including the Dr Harty Cup, as a student at Thurles CBS. He later lined out with TUS Midwest in the Fitzgibbon Cup. At club level with Golden–Kilfeacle, Leamy captained the team to the Tipperary IHC title in 2025.

At inter-county level, Leamy first appeared for Tipperary during a two-year tenure with the minor team in 2019 and 2020. He immediately progressed to the under-20 team, but ended his three years in that grade without silverware. Leamy was added to the senior team in 2026 and was included on the matchday panel for Tipperary's opening National Hurling League game against Galway.

== Career statistics ==
As of 1 February 2026

Team	Year	National League			Munster		All-Ireland		Total	
Team	Year	Division	Apps	Score	Apps	Score	Apps	Score	Apps	Score
Tipperary	2026	Division 1A	2	0-03	0	0-00	0	0-00	2	0-03
Career total			2	0-03	0	0-00	0	0-00	2	0-03

== Honours ==
Golden–Kilfeacle

- West Tipperary Senior Football Championship: 2024
- Tipperary Intermediate Hurling Championship: 2025 (c)
- West Tipperary Intermediate Hurling Championship: 2024
