= 1992 All-Ireland Minor Hurling Championship =

All-Ireland Minor Hurling Championship 1992
Championship Details
- Dates: 15 April 1992 - 6 September 1992
- Teams: 15

All Ireland Champions
- Winners: Galway (2nd win)
- Captain: Conor O'Donovan
- Manager: Mattie Murphy

All Ireland Runners-up
- Runners-up: Waterford
- Captain: Paddy O'Donnell
- Manager: Jim Greene

Provincial Champions
- Munster: Waterford
- Leinster: Kilkenny
- Ulster: Antrim
- Connacht: Not Played

Championship Statistics
- Top Scorer: Paul Flynn (6-25)

The 1992 All-Ireland Minor Hurling Championship was the 62nd staging of the All-Ireland Minor Hurling Championship since its establishment by the Gaelic Athletic Association in 1928. The championship began on 15 April 1992 and ended on 6 September 1992.

Kilkenny entered the championship as the defending champions in search of a third successive All-Ireland title, however, they were beaten by Galway in an All-Ireland semi-final replay.

On 6 September 1992, Galway won the championship following a 1–13 to 2–04 defeat of Waterford in the All-Ireland final. This was their second All-Ireland title overall and their first title since 1993.

Waterford's Paul Flynn was the championship's top scorer with 6-25.

== Results ==
=== Leinster Minor Hurling Championship ===
Quarter-final

20 May 1992 Quarter-final	Offaly	2-10 - 2-08	Laois	St. Brendan's Park, Birr
	D O'Meara 0-5, D Gleeson 1-1, D Miller 1-0, N Claffey 0-3, M O'Rourke 0-1.		L Tynan 1-1, D Cuddy 0-4, M Kirby 1-0, A Cullinane 0-2, O Dowling 0-1.

Semi-finals

30 June 1992 Semi-final	Kilkenny	1-24 - 0-03	Dublin	O'Moore Park, Portlaoise
	D Maher 1-6, D Byrne 0-6, F Doyle 0-4, P Davis 0-2, B McEvoy 0-2, G Ronan 0-2, J Dowling 0-1, L Smyth 0-1.		G Ennis 0-2, P Lanigan 0-1.

1 July 1992 Semi-final	Wexford	0-13 - 1-04	Offaly	Nowlan Park, Kilkenny
	E Furlong 0-5, T Kavanagh 0-5, R McCarthy 0-1, M Byrne 0-1, S Carley 0-1.		G Searson 1-0, K Claffey 0-3, N Murphy 0-1.

Final

19 July 1992 Final	Kilkenny	1-09 - 0-11	Wexford	Croke Park, Dublin
	F Doyle 1-3, D Byrne 0-2, G Ronan 0-1, B McEvoy 0-1, L Smith 0-1, D Maher 0-1.		E Furlong 0-7, T Kavanagh 0-2, K Lacey 0-2.	Referee: A Mac Suibhne (Dublin)

=== Munster Minor Hurling Championship ===
First round

15 April 1992 First round	Waterford	1-10 - 0-05	Clare	Semple Stadium, Thurles
	P Flynn 1-4, J Fitzpatrick 0-3, B McCarthy 0-2, T Kiely 0-1.		J Helay 0-4, R O'Hara 0-1.	Referee: M Doyle (Tipperary)

15 April 1992 First round	Tipperary	1-07 - 0-09	Limerick	Mitchelstown
	Tommy Dunne 1-5, D Kehir 0-1, P Darcy 0-1.		J Moran 0-8, P Cullinane 0-1.	Referee: JM Kelly (Waterford)

Semi-finals

28 April 1992 Semi-final	Waterford	5-14 - 0-05	Kerry	Páirc Mac Gearailt, Fermoy
	P Flynn 2-3, J Fitzpatrick 0-5, T Kiely 1-1, D McGrath 1-1, N Connors 1-0, JJ Ronayne 0-2, F O'Shea 0-1, P Veale 0-1.		O Diggins 0-2, D Loane 0-1, E Sullivan 0-1, J Healy 0-1.

1 May 1992 Semi-final	Tipperary	1-11 - 0-11	Cork	Gaelic Grounds, Limerick
	Tommy Dunne 0-7, D Bourke 1-0, R Tomlinson 0-2, K Slevin 0-2.		J Smiddy 0-7, F McCormack 0-2, S McGrath 0-2.	Referee: S McMahon (Clare)

Finals

5 July 1992 Final	Waterford	4-07 - 3-10	Tipperary	Páirc Uí Chaoimh, Cork
	P Flynn 3-6, D McGrath 1-0, P Foley 0-1.		Tommy Dunne 0-5, R Killeen 1-1, K Slevin 1-0, P Harnan 1-0, R Tomlinson 0-3, J Wade 0-1.	Referee: J O'Leary (Cork)

24 July 1992 Final replay	Waterford	2-10 - 0-14	Tipperary	Páirc Uí Chaoimh, Cork
	JJ Ronayne 1-1, R Ryan 0-4, P Foley 1-0, T Kiely 0-2, P Flynn 0-2, D McGrath 0-1.		Tommy Dunne 0-9, R Tomlinson 0-2, Terry Dunne 0-1, K Slevin 0-1, P Morrissey 0-1.	Referee: J O'Leary (Cork)

=== Ulster Minor Hurling Championship ===
Semi-final

5 July 1992 Semi-final	Down	4-08 - 1-11	Derry	Casement Park, Belfast
	M Keating 2-0, M Coulter 1-3, D Harris 1-1, G Dorrian 0-2, C McGrattan 0-1, J Crawford 0-1.		Gregg Biggs 1-5, G McGonagle 0-3, Gary Biggs 0-1, P McCloy 0-1, D McGrellis 0-1.

Final

12 July 1992 Final	Antrim	0-12 - 0-07	Down	Casement Park, Belfast
	B McNaughton 0-2, PJ O'Mullan 0-2, D Connolly 0-2, S Shannon 0-1, F McMullan 0-1, R Lavery 0-1, A Mort 0-1, C McCambridge 0-1, J Boyle 0-1.		M Pucci 0-2, C Shields 0-1, D Harris 0-1, B Braniff 0-1, J Crawford 0-1, G Clarke 0-1.

=== All-Ireland Minor Hurling Championship ===
Semi-finals

9 August 1992 Semi-final	Galway	1-16 - 1-16	Kilkenny	Croke Park, Dublin
	D Coen 0-7, C O'Doherty 1-1, F Forde 0-3, S Corcoran 0-2, P Kelly 0-1, M Spellman 0-1, C O'Donovan 0-1.		D Byrne 0-9, G Walsh 1-0, P Davis 0-3, G Ronan 0-2, P Gahan 0-1, B McEvoy 0-1.	Referee: K Walsh (Clare)

16 August 1992 Semi-final	Waterford	3-16 - 3-07	Antrim	Croke Park, Dublin
	P Flynn 0-8, P Foley 2-0, JP Fitzpatrick 1-1, JJ Ronayne 0-3, R Ryan 0-2, F O'Shea 0-1, D McGrath 0-1.		J O'Boyle 1-3, PJ O'Mullan 1-1, A Mort 1-0, C McCambridge 0-1, P Graham 0-1, D Gallagher 0-1.	Referee: P Aherne (Carlow)

23 August 1992 Semi-final	Galway	3-12 - 1-10	Kilkenny	Gaelic Grounds, Limerick
	D Coen 0-6, F Forde 1-2, C O'Doherty 1-1, D Walsh 1-0, S Corcoran 0-2, M Lynskey 0-1.		G Ronan 0-6, F Doyle 1-1, D Byrne 0-1, G Walsh 0-1, M Owens 0-1.	Referee: K Walsh (Clare)

Final

6 September 1992 Final	Galway	1-13 - 2-04	Waterford	Croke Park, Dublin
	S Corcoran 1-2, F Forde 0-3, P Kelly 0-3, D Coen 0-2, C Donovan 0-2, M Lynskey 0-1.		P Foley 2-0, P Flynn 0-2, JJ Ronayne 0-1, R Ryan 0-1.	Referee: T Murray (Limerick)

== Championship statistics ==
=== Top scorers ===
Top scorers overall

Rank	Player	Club	Tally	Total	Matches	Average
1	Paul Flynn	Waterford	6-25	43	6	7.16
2	Tommy Dunne	Tipperary	1-26	29	4	7.25
3	Denis Byrne	Kilkenny	0-18	18	4	4.50
4	Paul Foley	Waterford	5-01	16	6	2.66
5	Darragh Coen	Galway	0-15	15	3	5.00

=== Miscellaneous ===
- Waterford won the Munster Championship for the first time since 1948.
