= Bernard Gaffney =

Irish hurler

Personal information
- Native name: Bearnard Ó Geamhna (Irish)
- Born: 1986 (age 39–40) Newmarket, County Clare, Ireland
- Occupation: Civil engineer

Sport
- Sport: Hurling
- Position: Centre-forward
Club
- Years: Club
- Newmarket-on-Fergus
Club titles
- Clare titles: 0
College
- Years: College
- 2005-2011: Limerick Institute of Technology
College titles
- Fitzgibbon titles: 1
Inter-county*
Years	County	Apps (scores)
2007	Clare	2 (0-01)
Inter-county titles
- Munster titles: 0
- All-Irelands: 0
- NHL: 0
- All Stars: 0
- *Inter County team apps and scores correct as of 18:58, 8 December 2021.

Bernard Gaffney (born 1986) is an Irish former hurler who played at club level with Newmarket-on-Fergus and at inter-county level with the Clare senior hurling team. He usually lined out as a forward.

== Career ==
Gaffney first came to prominence as a hurler at juvenile and underage levels with the Newmarket-on-Fergus club before eventually progressing onto the senior team. He simultaneously represented the St. Flannan's College team and won an All-Ireland Colleges Championship title in 2005, having earlier won consecutive Harty Cup titles. Gaffney first appeared on the inter-county scene during a two-year spell with the Clare minor hurling team. He progressed onto the under-21 team before lining out with the Clare senior hurling team during the 2007 season. Gaffney also won a Fitzgibbon Cup medal with the Limerick Institute of Technology that year.

== Career statistics ==
Team	Year	National League			Munster		All-Ireland		Total	
Team	Year	Division	Apps	Score	Apps	Score	Apps	Score	Apps	Score
Clare	2007	Division 1A	5	4-20	1	0-01	1	0-00	7	4-21
Career total			5	4-20	1	0-01	1	0-00	7	4-21

== Honours ==
St. Flannan's College

- Dr. Croke Cup: 2005
- Dr. Harty Cup: 2004, 2005

Limerick Institute of Technology

- Fitzgibbon Cup: 2007
