= 1928 All-Ireland Minor Hurling Championship =

All-Ireland Minor Hurling Championship 1928
Championship Details
- Dates: 20 May 1928 - 27 October 1929

All Ireland Champions
- Winners: Cork (1st win)
- Captain: Larry Horgan

All Ireland Runners-up
- Runners-up: Dublin

Provincial Champions
- Munster: Cork
- Leinster: Dublin
- Ulster: Not Played
- Connacht: Not Played

The 1928 All-Ireland Minor Hurling Championship was the first staging of the All-Ireland Minor Hurling Championship. The championship began on 20 May 1928 and ended on 27 October 1929.

Cork won the title following a 7-6 to 4-0 victory over Dublin in a second replay of the final.

== Teams ==
=== Team summaries ===
Leinster	Munster
Dublin; Kilkenny; Laois; Louth; Meath; Offaly; Wexford	Clare; Cork; Limerick; Tipperary; Waterford

== Results ==
=== Leinster Minor Hurling Championship ===
20 May 1928 Quarter-final	Meath	5-2 - 1-2	Louth	Páirc Tailteann

3 June 1928 Quarter-final	Wexford	0-3 - 7-3	Kilkenny	New Ross Sportsground

2 September 1928 Semi-final	Laois	2-2 - 6-9	Kilkenny	Moore Park

9 September 1928 Semi-final	Dublin	9-5 - 4-1	Meath	Croke Park

Final	Dublin	w/o - scr.	Kilkenny

30 September 1928 Alternative final	Dublin	6-6 - 3-2	Offaly

=== Munster Minor Hurling Championship ===
15 July 1928 Quarter-final	Waterford	5-3 - 3-2	Limerick	Thurles Sportsfield

29 July 1928 Semi-final	Cork	7-5 - 0-3	Clare	Thurles Sportsfield

19 May 1929 Semi-final	Tipperary	4-2 - 8-2	Waterford	Carrick-on-Suir Sportsfield

2 June 1929 Final	Cork	3-4 - 3-2	Waterford	Mitchelstown Sportsfield

=== All-Ireland Minor Hurling Championship ===
1 September 1929 Final	Cork	1-8 - 3-2	Dublin	Croke Park

27 October 1929 Final replay	Cork	7-6 - 4-0	Dublin	Cork Athletic Grounds
