= Connacht Minor Hurling Championship =

Football tournament in Ireland

- Founded: 1931
- Region: Connacht (GAA)
- Number of teams: 3
- Current champions: Defunct
- Website: Official website

The Connacht Minor Hurling Championship was an annual hurling competition organised sporadically by the Connacht Council of the Gaelic Athletic Association between 1931 and 1989 for the youngest competitors (under-18) in the province of Connacht in Ireland.

The series of games were played during the summer months with the Connacht final usually being played in June or July. The prize for the winning team was an unnamed cup. The championship was always played on a straight knockout basis whereby once a team lost they were eliminated from the series.

The Connacht Championship was an integral part of the wider All-Ireland Minor Hurling Championship. The winners of the Connacht final, like their counterparts in the other three provinces, advanced directly to the semi-final stage of the All-Ireland series of games.

Only the strongest hurling teams participated in the Connacht Championship, namely Galway, Roscommon and Mayo.

The title has been won at least once by two of the Connacht counties, both of which have won the title more than once. The all-time record-holders are Galway, who have won the competition 26 times.

== History ==
The Connacht Minor Hurling Championship was first played in 1931. It was the last of the four provincial championships to have been established after Leinster and Munster in 1928 and Ulster in 1930. Due to a lack of competitiveness and a predisposition towards Gaelic football in the province, both Galway and Roscommon became the most dominant teams.

In 1959 all of Galway's competing hurling teams transferred provinces to Munster. This left the weaker teams with a more level playing field with Roscommon, Mayo and Leitrim all becoming more competitive. In 1967 the provincial championship ended when Roscommon fielded a team in the All-Ireland Minor B Hurling Championship. Galway returned after their sojourn in Munster in 1970 and went on to represent the province unopposed until 1989 when the championship was unsuccessfully revived. Since then Galway have represented Connacht in the All-Ireland series, while the other teams have entered the All-Ireland Minor B Championship.

== General statistics ==
=== Performance by county ===
	County	Wins	Runners-up	Years won	Years runner-up
1	Galway	26		1931, 1932, 1933, 1934, 1935, 1936, 1937, 1938, 1939, 1940, 1941, 1945, 1946, 1947, 1948, 1949, 1950, 1951, 1952, 1953, 1954, 1955, 1956, 1957, 1958, 1989	
2	Roscommon	5	20	1959, 1960, 1962, 1963, 1966	1931, 1932, 1936, 1937, 1938, 1939, 1940, 1941, 1946, 1947, 1948, 1949, 1950, 1951, 1953, 1954, 1955, 1956, 1957, 1958
3	Mayo	1	2	1964	1935, 1952
3	Leitrim	1		1965	

=== Biggest Connacht final wins ===
- The most one sided Connacht finals:
  - 49 points – 1956: Galway 11-20 (53) – (4) 1-1 Roscommon
  - 42 points – 1958: Galway 12-10 (46) – (4) 1-1 Roscommon
  - 42 points – 1953: Galway 12-10 (46) – (4) 1-1 Roscommon
  - 40 points – 1955: Galway 12-11 (47) – (7) 2-1 Roscommon

== List of Connacht Finals ==
All-Ireland runners-up

Year	Winner	Score	Runners-up	Score
1931	Galway	7-02 (23)	Roscommon	1-01 (4)
1932	Galway	9-05 (32)	Roscommon	0-00 (0)
1933-1934	Galway unopposed			
1935	Galway	9-04 (31)	Mayo	1-03 (6)
1936	Galway	7-07 (28)	Roscommon	1-01 (4)
1937	Galway	4-06 (18)	Roscommon	0-02 (2)
1938	Galway	7-03 (24)	Roscommon	3-00 (9)
1939	Galway	5-05 (20)	Roscommon	2-02 (8)
1940	Galway	7-05 (26)	Roscommon	1-02 (5)
1941	Galway unopposed			
1942-1944	Championship suspended due to the Emergency			
1945	Galway unopposed			
1946	Galway	5-09 (24)	Roscommon	0-01 (1)
1947	Galway	9-06 (33)	Roscommon	1-01 (4)
1948	Galway	4-06 (18)	Roscommon	5-02 (17)
1949 (R)	Galway	2-07 (13); 6-05 (23)	Roscommon	3-04 (13); 4-04 (16)
1950	Galway	8-07 (31)	Roscommon	2-00 (6)
1951	Galway	6-09 (27)	Roscommon	2-01 (7)
1952	Galway	3-07 (16)	Mayo	1-01 (4)
1953	Galway	12-10 (46)	Roscommon	1-00 (3)
1954	Galway	9-09 (36)	Roscommon	1-01 (4)
1955	Galway	12-11 (47)	Roscommon	2-01 (7)
1956	Galway	11-20 (53)	Roscommon	1-01 (4)
1957	Galway	w/o	Roscommon	scr.
1958	Galway	12-10 (46)	Roscommon	1-01 (4)
1959	Roscommon	3-08 (17)	Mayo	3-02 (11)
1960	Roscommon	2-08 (14)	Mayo	2-05 (11)
1961	No Championship			
1962	Roscommon			
1963	Roscommon	1-07 (10)	Mayo	3-00 (9)
1964	Championship unfinished			
1965	Leitrim	8-05 (29)	Mayo	0-00 (0)
1966	Roscommon			
1967-1969	The Connacht teams competed in the All-Ireland Minor B Championship			
1970-1988	Galway represented the province in the All-Ireland series			
1989	Galway	2-14 (20)	Roscommon	0-06 (6)
1990–present	Galway represented the province in the All-Ireland series			

== Sources ==
- Des Donegan, The Complete Handbook of Gaelic Games (Dublin: DBA Publications Ltd., 2005).
