= List of Galway minor hurling team captains =

This article lists players who have captained the Galway minor hurling team in the All-Ireland Minor Hurling Championship.

== List of captains ==
Year	Player	Club	National titles
1981	Ger Fallon	Kilnadeema-Leitrim	
1982	Pete Finnerty	Mullagh	
1983	Anthony Cunningham	St Thomas's	All-Ireland Hurling Final-winning captain
1984			
1985	Éamonn Burke	Killimordaly	
1986	Ray Duane	Mullagh	
1987			
1988			
1989	Kevin Devine	Tynagh-Abbey/Duniry	
1990			
1991	Maurice Headd	St Thomas	
1992	Conor O'Donovan	Liam Mellows	All-Ireland Hurling Final-winning captain
1993	Darragh Coen	Clarinbridge	
1994	Greg Kennedy	Loughrea	All-Ireland Hurling Final-winning captain
1995	Vinnie Maher	Loughrea	
1996	Michael Healy	Castlegar	
1997	Eoin McDonagh	Barna	
1998	Keith Hayes	Portumna	
1999	John Culkin	Abbeyknockmoy	All-Ireland Hurling Final-winning captain
2000	Richie Murray	St Thomas's	All-Ireland Hurling Final-winning captain
2001	Ger Farragher	Castlegar	
2002	Joe Gantley	Beagh	
2003	Niall Healy	Craughwell	
2004	John Lee	Liam Mellows	All-Ireland Hurling Final-winning captain
2005	Andrew Keary	Killimor	All-Ireland Hurling Final-winning captain
2006	Joe Canning	Portumna	
2007	Mark McMahon	Gort	
2008	David Burke	St Thomas's	
2009	Richie Cummins	Gort	All-Ireland Hurling Final-winning captain
2010	Daithí Burke	Turloughmore	
2011	Shane Moloney	Tynagh-Abbey/Duniry	All-Ireland Hurling Final-winning captain
2012	Paul Killeen	Tynagh-Abbey/Duniry	
2013	Darragh Dolan	Cappataggle	
2014	Seán Linnane	Turloughmore	
2015	Seán Loftus	Turloughmore	All-Ireland Hurling Final-winning captain
2016	Jack Fitzpatrick	Killimordaly	
2017	Darren Morrissey	Sarsfields	All-Ireland Hurling Final-winning captain
2018	Seán Neary	Castlegar	All-Ireland Hurling Final-winning captain
2019	Ian McGlynn	Kilconieron	All-Ireland Hurling Final-winning captain
2020	Adam Nolan	Kilnadeema-Leitrim	All-Ireland Hurling Final-winning captain
2021	Diarmuid Davoren	Moycullen	
2022	Rory Burke	Oranmore Maree	
2023	Sean Murphy	Clarinbridge	
2024	Cathal Maloney	Ballygar	
2025	Sean Moran	Castlegar	
2026	Gus Lohan	Oranmore Maree	
