= 2026 Tipperary county hurling team season =

Hurling (sport) season

- Team: Tipperary county hurling team
- Manager: Liam Cahill
- Captain: Ronan Maher
- All-Ireland SHC: Did not qualify
- Munster SHC: 4th in Group Stage
- National League: 3rd Division 1A
- Top scorer Championship: Darragh McCarthy (0-19)
- Highest SHC attendance: 44,348 (v Cork 19 April)
- Lowest SHC attendance: 11,982 (v Waterford 26 April)
- Standard Kit

The 2026 season was Liam Cahill's fourth year as manager of the Tipperary senior hurling team.

The team continued a sponsorship for the fifth year with financial services technology solutions company Fiserv but with a new jersey sponsor Clover who are owned by Fiserv and are there point-of-sale platform. The logo is a four-leaf clover but with three of the leaves silhouetted.

On 20 January it was announced that Ronan Maher would remain as captain for a third consecutive year with Jake Morris also returning as vice-captain.

The team started the season as defending All-Ireland champions after defeating Cork by 3–27 to 1–19 in the All-Ireland final on 20 July 2025.

== 2026 senior hurling management team ==
Liam Cahill continued as manager for a fourth year after being given a two-year extension in October 2025, with the option of a third year. Toomevara's Michael Bevans continued as coach with Loughmore Castleiney's Declan Laffan and Clonoulty Rossmore's TJ Ryan also continuing as selectors. David Herity also continued in his role as coaching support for the team

=== 2026 squad ===
At the end of November 2025, manager Liam Cahill announced a training panel with 15 players added to the panel from 2025.

Former All-Star goalkeeper Brian Hogan returned after spending the last three years in Australia, with seven players promoted from the under 20 panel, Mason Cawley (Nenagh Eire Og), Adam Daly (Knockavilla-Donaskeigh Kickhams), Joe Egan (Moycarkey/Borris), Cathal English (Father Sheehy’s), Tom Delaney (Borris-Ileigh), Cathal O’Reilly (Holycross/Ballycahill), and Adam Ryan (Arravale Rovers). Adam Hall, Kevin McCarthy, Darragh Tynan, Brian Og O’Dwyer, Charlie Ryan have also been added to the training panel with recalls also for former seniors Jack Leamy and Paddy Creedon.

Four players left the panel, Conor Bowe, Kieran Cummins, Gavin O’Halloran and Danny Slattery.

On 20 January, ahead of the start of the National Hurling League, manager Liam Cahill named a panel of 43 players for the league, which included 13 new players added to the panel since last year. Five sets of brothers are included in the panel, the McGrath’s, McCormack’s, and Stakelum’s, joined this year by the McCarthy’s and Morgan’s, with Kevin McCarthy and Aaron Morgan joining their brothers Darragh McCarthy and Craig Morgan in the panel.

Noel McGrath returned for his 18th season with Ronan Maher remaining as captain with Jake Morris also returning as vice-captain.

The following players made their competitive senior debut in 2026.

- Cathal O'Reilly against Galway on 24 January.
- Jack Leamy against Galway on 24 January.
- Stefan Tobin against Galway on 24 January.
- Paddy McCormack against Offaly on 1 February.
- Adam Daly against Offaly on 1 February.
- Cathal English against Offaly on 1 February.
- Keith Ryan against Limerick on 21 February.
- Kevin McCarthy against Waterford on 15 March.
- Jamie Ormond against Limerick on 24 May.

== 2026 Munster Senior Hurling League ==
=== Summary ===
The Co-Op Superstores Munster Senior Hurling League began in early January. Tipperary played Waterford in their first match of the year on 3 January in Fethard Town Park Grass Pitch. The game had been originally scheduled to take place at the Clonmel Sportsfield at 2pm, but due to a frozen pitch it was changed to Fethard for a 3.15pm start. Tipperary started the game with four starters from the 2025 All-Ireland final win over Cork, Robert Doyle, Michael Breen, Bryan O’Mara and Andrew Ormond, as well as three players who came on as substitutes, Alan Tynan, Oisín O’Donoghue and Darragh Stakelum. Capacity for the match was limited to a maximum of 2,000 supporters and was sold-out. Tipperary scored a goal in the first half when Paddy Creedon fired low to the net and had a 1-11 to 0-7 lead at half-time, and also led by eight points with ten minutes of normal time remaining. However the match ended in a draw, 1-18 to 1-18 with a late Jack Leamy free rescuing the draw for Tipperary.

On 11 January, Tipperary played Kerry in their second game of the Munster Hurling League in Austin Stack Park in Tralee. Tipperary needed a 38 point win to reach to the final after Waterford had defeated Kerry by 6-25 to 0-6 four days earlier. Manager Liam Cahill included 17 of the 2025 All-Ireland winning panel in the matchday squad and 8 starters from the All-Ireland final win. In wet conditions, Kerry had a one point lead at half-time before Oisin O’Donoghue’s scored a goal for Tipperary in the 47th minute with a low shot to the net from an angle with Tipperary going on to win by 1-16 to 1-7, but failing to qualify for the final.

=== Results ===
3 January
15:15
Munster Senior Hurling League Group A

Tipperary	1–18 – 1–18	Waterford
Paddy McCormack and Jack Leamy (0-4, 4f each); Paddy Creedon (1-1); Darragh Stakelum (0-2); Brian McGrath (0-2, 1f); Robert Doyle, Joe Caesar, Josh Keller, Alan Tynan and Andrew Ormond (0-1 each).	Report Barry Hogan; C Martin, R Doyle, M Breen; J Caesar, B McGrath, B O’Mara (c); J Keller, A Tynan; O O’Donoghue, P McGarry, D Stakelum; A Ormond, P Creedon, P McCormack; Subs: J Leamy for McCormack (HT); Adam Ryan for Breen (HT); J Fogarty for McGarry (HT); J Egan for A Tynan (35); W Connors for O’Mara (45); A Daly for D Stakelum (48).	R Halloran (0-8, 6f); C Treen (1-3); J Booth (0-2); B Nolan (0-1, 1f); M O’Mathuna, J Power, C Keane, S Walsh (0-1 each).

Fethard Town Park Grass Pitch, Fethard
Referee: C O’Regan (Cork)
11 January
13:00
Munster Senior Hurling League Group A

Tipperary	1–16 – 1–7	Kerry
Darragh McCarthy 0-4f, Oisin O’Donoghue 1-1, Jack Leamy (0-3, 0-2f), Jake Morris, Andrew Ormond 0-2 each, Sam O’Farrell, Paddy McCormack, Josh Keller, Conor Stakelum, all 0-1 each.	Report Rhys Shelly; Conor Martin, Bryan O'Mara, Johnny Ryan; Joe Caesar, Brian McGrath, Eoghan Connolly; Willie Connors, Josh Keller; Jake Morris (c), Andrew Ormond, Sam O'Farrell; Darragh McCarthy, Oisin O'Donoghue, Paddy McCormack; Subs used: Seamus Kennedy for McGrath (12, inj), Conor Stakelum for Connors (HT), Darragh Stakelum for O’Farrell (HT), Jack Leamy for McCarthy (45), Robert Doyle for Ormond (60).	Michael Slattery 1-1, Ronan Walsh 0-4f, Jordan Conway, Luke Rochford 0-1 each.

Austin Stack Park, Tralee
Referee: Niall Malone (Clare)

== 2026 National Hurling League ==
=== Summary ===
The National Hurling League started in late January with Tipperary's opening game was against Galway, managed by Micheál Donoghue on Saturday 24 January at Semple Stadium. The match was shown live on RTÉ2 in front of a crowd of 7,762. Manager Liam Cahill named his team for the match on 23 January, with 10 players that started the 2025 All-Ireland Hurling final named to start. In wet conditions, Tipperary won the game on a 1-21 to 1-16 scoreline after the teams were level on 0-9 each at half-time and also level on 11 occasions. The Tipperary goal came in the 64th minute from Darragh Stakelum with a low shot to the net from the right, putting Tipperary into a three point lead. Jake Morris was named as the man of the match.

On 15 March in the fifth round of the league, Tipperary travelled to Walsh Park to play Waterford, managed by Peter Queally in the re-arranged fixture after the initial match was postponed due to bereavement. The match was shown live on the TG4 app and Waterford had a 1-17 to 1-7 going into first-half stoppage time, before Tipperary scored two points to reduce the gap to eight points at half-time, the Tipperary goal came from John McGrath in his first start of 2026 in the 22nd minute. In the second half Tipperary came back and got a second goal from Gearóid O’Connor in the 58th minute and went on to win by four points on a 2-24 to 1-23 final score, a result that relegated Waterford to Division 1B for 2027.

=== Results ===
24 January
19:00
National Hurling League Division 1A Round 1

Tipperary	1–21 – 1–16	Galway
Jake Morris 0-8 (3fs); Darragh McCarthy 0-7 (6fs); Darragh Stakelum 1-0; Sam O’Farrell, Andrew Ormond 0-2 each; Conor Stakelum, Seamus Kennedy 0-1 each.	Report Rhys Shelly; Cathal O’Reilly, Robert Doyle, Michael Breen; Joe Caesar, Bryan O’Mara, Seamus Kennedy; Willie Connors, Conor Stakelum; Sam O’Farrell, Andrew Ormond, Jake Morris (c); Darragh McCarthy, Oisin O’Donoghue, Jack Leamy; Subs: Johnny Ryan for Doyle (25 inj); Darragh Stakelum for Leamy (HT); Josh Keller for Caesar (40); Paddy McCormack for McCarthy (53); Stefan Tobin for O’Donoghue (69).	Rory Burke 1-3; John Fleming 0-3; Padraic Mannion, Darragh Neary, Jason Rabbitte, Aaron Niland (2fs) 0-2 each; Gavin Lee, Colm Molloy 0-1 each.

Semple Stadium
Referee: Sean Stack (Dublin)
1 February
14:00
National Hurling League Division 1A Round 2

Offaly	1–18 – 5–24	Tipperary
Brian Duignan 1-2, Eoghan Cahill 0-4 (0-2f), Daniel Bourke 0-3, Oisín Kelly 0-2, Liam Hoare 0-2f, Dan Ravenhill 0-1, Cathal King 0-1, Luke Watkins 0-1, Adam Screeney 0-1f, Ben Conneely 0-1.	Report Barry Hogan; Cathal O’Reilly, Bryan O’Mara, Johnny Ryan; Conor Martin, Craig Morgan, Seamus Kennedy; Willie Connors (c), Conor Stakelum; Josh Keller, Andrew Ormond, Gearóid O’Connor; Jack Leamy, Paddy McCormack, Jason Forde; Subs: John McGrath for McCormack (half-time), Darragh Stakelum for Keller (half-time), Noel McGrath for Ormond (46), Adam Daly for Morgan (51), Cathal English for C Stakelum (61).	Jason Forde 3-10 (1-0 pen, 0-5f, 0-2 65s), John McGrath 1-1, Paddy McCormack 1-0, Conor Stakelum 0-3, Jack Leamy 0-3, Josh Keller 0-2, Darragh Satkelum 0-2, Conor Martin 0-1, Gearóid O’Connor 0-1, Noel McGrath 0-1

Glenisk O'Connor Park
Referee: Colm McDonald (Antrim)
7 February
19:30
National Hurling League Division 1A Round 3

Cork	0–29 – 0–22	Tipperary
Alan Connolly 0-8 (4fs); Darragh Fitzgibbon 0-7 (1f); Diarmuid Healy, William Buckey 0-3 each; Eoin Downey, Mark Coleman, Shane Barrett 0-2 each; Brian Hayes, Tim O’Mahony 0-1 each.	Report Rhys Shelly; Johnny Ryan, Bryan O’Mara, Cathal O’Reilly; Sam O’Farrell, Craig Morgan, Séamus Kennedy; Willie Connors, Conor Stakelum; Andrew Ormond, Jake Morris (c), Josh Keller; Darragh Stakelum, Oisín O’Donoghue, Jason Forde; Subs: John McGrath for D Stakelum (HT), Eoghan Connolly for Kennedy (44), Noel McGrath for Keller (49), Darragh McCarthy for O’Donoghue (56), Paddy McCormack for Ormond (61).	Eoghan Connolly 0-4 (4f); Jake Morris 0-3 (1f); Willie Connors, Andrew Ormond, Jason Forde (2f), Darragh McCarthy (2f) 0-2 each; Cathal O’Reilly, Sam O’Farrell, Craig Morgan, Séamus Kennedy, Conor Stakelum, Oisín O’Donoghue, Noel McGrath 0-1 each.

Páirc Uí Chaoimh
Referee: Liam Gordon (Galway)
21 February
17:30
National Hurling League Division 1A Round 4

Tipperary	0–21 – 0–36	Limerick
Darragh McCarthy 0-7 (7f); Noel McGrath 0-6; Eoghan Connolly (1f, 1 65), John McGrath (2f) 0-2 each; Jake Morris, Seán Kenneally, Keith Ryan, Darragh Stakelum 0-1 each.	Report Barry Hogan; Cathal O’Reilly, Bryan O’Mara, Eoghan Connolly; Joe Caesar, Craig Morgan, Séamus Kennedy; Willie Connors, Conor Stakelum; Sam O’Farrell, Andrew Ormond, Noel McGrath; Darragh McCarthy, Jake Morris (c), Seán Kenneally; Subs: Darragh Stakelum for O’Farrell (30), Oisín O’Donoghue for Ormond (h-t), John McGrath for McCarthy (51), Josh Keller for C Stakelum (56), Keith Ryan for Caesar (61).	Aidan O’Connor 0-11 (3f, 2 65s); Shane O’Brien 0-6; Peter Casey 0-4; Adam English, Darragh O’Donovan, Gearóid Hegarty, Aaron Gillane, Tom Morrissey, Donnacha Ó Dálaigh 0-2 each; Mike Casey, Colin Coughlan, Cathal O’Neill 0-1 each.

Semple Stadium
Referee: Colm Lyons (Cork)
15 March
14:00
National Hurling League Division 1A Round 5

Waterford	1–23 – 2–24	Tipperary
Reuben Halloran 0-8 (6f, 1 65); Dessie Hutchinson 0-5; Seán Walsh 1-1; Shane Bennett 0-4; Mark Fitzgerald, Seán Mackey, Darragh Lyons, Jack Prendergast, Peter Hogan 0-1 each.	Report Rhys Shelly; Robert Doyle, Ronan Maher (c), Michael Breen; Oisín O’Donoghue, Bryan O’Mara, Eoghan Connolly; Craig Morgan, Conor Stakelum; Joe Caesar, Kevin McCarthy, Jake Morris; John McGrath, Jason Forde, Stefan Tobin; Subs: Andrew Ormond for Kevin McCarthy (25), Gearóid O’Connor for Caesar (h-t), Darragh Stakelum for Morgan (48), Darragh McCarthy for Forde (65), Seán Kenneally for Tobin (70+2).	John McGrath 1-4; Jason Forde 0-6 (5f); Stefan Tobin 0-4; Gearóid O’Connor 1-0; Eoghan Connolly (1 65, 1f), Jake Morris, Darragh McCarthy (2f), Andrew Ormond 0-2 each; Conor Stakelum, Oisín O’Donoghue 0-1 each.

Walsh Park
Referee: Thomas Gleeson (Dublin)
21 March
19:00
National Hurling League Division 1A Round 6

Tipperary	2–27 – 3–24	Kilkenny
Jason Forde 0-8 (5 frees); Jake Morris 1-5; Eoghan Connolly 0-5 (3 frees); Darragh McCarthy 1-1; Sam O’Farrell, Sean Kenneally 0-2 each; Oisin O’Donoghue; Conor Martin; Michael Breen; Alan Tynan 0-1 each.	Report Rhys Shelley; Robert Doyle, Brian McGrath, Michael Breen; Eoghan Connolly, Ronan Maher (c), Oisin O'Donoghue; Conor Martin, Darragh Stakelum; Jake Morris, Alan Tynan, Sam O'Farrell; Darragh McCarthy, Gearoid O'Connor, Jason Forde; Subs: Sean Kenneally for O'Connor, h-t; Johnny Ryan for B.McGrath, h-t; Noel McGrath for Stakelum, 54 mins; Andrew Ormond for Martin, 57 mins; Peter McGarry for Forde, 69 mins.	TJ Reid 1-8 (0-4 frees); Liam Moore, Martin Keoghan 1-2 each; Cian Kenny 0-3 (2 frees); John Donnolly, Ed McDermott 0-2 each; Jordan Molloy, Richie Reid, Killian Doyle, Eoin Cody, Luke Hogan 0-1 each.

Semple Stadium
Referee: James Owens (Wexford).

== 2026 Munster Senior Hurling Championship ==
The Munster Senior hurling championship started on 19 April 2026. Ticket prices for terrace were €30 and stand tickets were €35, the same as in 2025.

=== Round 1 (v Cork 19 April) ===
On Sunday 19 April, Tipperary played Cork, managed by Ben O'Connor in their first match of the Munster Championship at Semple Stadium. The match was played in dry sunny conditions in front of a sell-out crowd of 44,348 and was televised live on RTÉ 2 as part of the Sunday Game presented by Joanne Cantwell with on site analysis by Liam Sheedy, Joe Canning and Dónal Óg Cusack. Tickets for the game cost €35 for the stand and €30 for the terrace. Commentary on the game was provided by Marty Morrissey alongside Michael Duignan.

Stefan Tobin started for Tipperary to make his Chanmpionship debut, with Oisín O’Donoghue named to start for the first time in the half-back line, but eventually played in the half-forward line. The teams were level at half-time on 0-13 to 0-13. In the second half, Cork pulled away and prevented Tipperary from scoring from play in the second half until the 64th minute. Cork outscored Tipperary by 0-11 to 0-01 between the 44th and 59th minutes of the game. As the game went into added time, susbstitute Alan Tynan scored a goal for Tipperary with a low shot to the left corner of the net at the town end to make it 0-28 to 1-21. Substitute Darragh McCarthy then scored with a free to reduce the Cork lead to three points, before Cork went on to win by four on a 0-29 to 1-22 scoreline. The win was the fifth successive championship win for Cork against Tipperary in Thurles. Tipperary’s home record in the current Munster Championship round-robin format is 3 wins from 13 games.

=== Round 2 (v Waterford 26 April) ===
On Sunday 26 April, Tipperary travelled to Walsh Park to play Waterford, managed by Peter Queally in their second match of the Munster Championship at Walsh Park. Tipperary had not won a Munster Championship game at Walsh Park since a 1-14 to 1-11 win in June 1996. The match was played in dry cloudy conditions in front of a sell-out crowd of 11,982, and was televised live on GAA+. Seamus Kennedy, Alan Tynan, Sam O’Farrell and Darragh McCarthy came into the team instead of Craig Morgan, Conor Stakelum, Stefan Tobin and Jason Forde from the named starting line-up. At half-time, Tipperary had an eleven point lead on a 1-18 to 1-07 scoreline, the Tipperary goal coming from Andrew Ormond in the 23rd minute when he rounded the goalkeeper on the right to shoot to the net, putting ten points between the sides on a 1-11 to 0-4 scoreline.

Early in the second half Waterford came back and got a goal from Jamie Barron when he fired powerfully to net to make the score 1-4 to 1-11. Tipperary were awarded a penalty when John McGrath was pulled down, Darragh McCarthy's low shot was saved by Waterford goalkeeper Billy Nolan with the score showing 1-18 to 1-10. Stephen Bennett then got a second goal for Waterford in the 54th minute when he ran in from the right before turning in to shoot with power to the net to make it 2-16 to 1-21. Waterford went on to go two points in front in the 66th minute. Tipperary responded and got level before points from Stefan Tobin, Jason Forde, and Ronan Maher gave them a three point lead deep into the four minutes of added time. With the last chance of the game, Waterford scored a third goal, a shot from Kevin Mahony with the last puck of the game from the left high to the right of the net to level the scores with the match finishing level. Oisín O'Donoghue was named as the man of the match.

=== Round 3 (v Clare 16 May) ===
On Saturday 16 May, Tipperary played Clare, managed by Brian Lohan in their third match of the Munster Championship at Semple Stadium. The match was played in dry conditions in front of a crowd of 32,327, and was televised live on GAA+. Craig Morgan and Jason Forde returned to the Tipperary team that was named to start on 15 May in place of Seamus Kennedy and Sam O’Farrell, there were no changes on match day to the starting team. Playing with the wind in the first half into the town end, Clare had a 0-14 to 0-8 at half-time. 47 seconds into the second half, Clare scored a goal from Ian Galvin when he batted the ball past Rhys Shelly into the right of the net to put Clare nine points in front. In the 41st minute, John McGrath had a goal chance with a shot along the ground which was saved down low by Éibhear Quilligan. Willie Connors was sent-off for Tipperary in the 51st minute after a second yellow card, with Clare going on to win the game by 11 points, 1-25 to 0-17.

The win by Clare meant that they guaranteed qualification in the top three from Munster. The defeat for Tipperary meant that if Limerick defeated Waterford the next day on 17 May, then Tipperary would be out of the All-Ireland Championship. Tipperary's elimination from the Championship was confirmed the next day when Limerick defeated Waterford by 2-29 to 2-20. Tipperary were outscored by 0-10 to 0-1 between the 19th and 36th minutes. It was the fourth time in a row that Clare defeated Tipperary in Thurles. Clare's Diarmuid Stritch was the man-of-the-match with 6 points from play.

Tipperary manager, Liam Cahill speaking after the game admitted his team played “in fear” and were physically dominated by Clare, and conceded only two of his players – Robert Doyle and Bryan O’Mara performed in this defeat, saying "“I don't want to make it any worse than it already is but with the exception of maybe Robert Doyle and Bryan O'Mara today, where else would you go to say that the rest of the players were up to a level that they'd be happy with themselves?"

=== Round 4 (v Limerick 24 May) ===
On Sunday 24 May, Tipperary, already eliminated from the Championship, played Limerick, managed by John Kiely in their final match of the Munster Championship at the Gaelic Grounds. The Tipperary team was named on 22 May, with Keith Ryan, Seamus Kennedy, Conor Stakelum, Noel McGrath and Stefan Tobin all coming into the starting line up. The match was not televised live. It was played in front of a crowd of 29,069 in warm sunny conditions of around 20°C to 24°C. Tipperary playing into the city end in the first half conceded a goal after 15 seconds from Aaron Gillane with a shot to the net, and were behind by 2-12 to 0-14 at half-time, the other goal coming direct from a 65 by Aidan O’Connor in the sixth minute which was misjudged by Tipperary goalkeeper Rhys Shelly.

Two minutes into the second half, Eoghan Connolly pulled down Kyle Hayes and received a black card with Diarmaid Byrnes scoring the penalty low to the left of the net. Limerick scored a further two goals, Aidan O’Connor got his second when he ran in from the right to shoot low to the left corner, and Aaron Gillane also got his second with a finish to the right of the net. Limerick went on to win by 17 points on a 5-27 to 0-25 scoreline and qualify for an eight Munster final in a row. Tipperary finished last in the group stage of the Munster Senior Hurling Championship. The win for Limerick tied their record championship win over Tipperary of 17 points, from 1947. Tipperary ended the Championship without a win for the fourth time since the round-robin system started in 2018, and also finished last for the third time in five years.

Tipperary manager, Liam Cahill speaking after the game defended his players saying ""We all have to be really mindful that these players are amateur players, they're getting a fair bit of criticism by a lot of platforms, especially nameless ones which are easy to hide behind."

=== Results ===
19 April
16:00
Round 1

Tipperary	1–22 – 0–29	Cork
Jason Forde 0-7 (7fs); Darragh McCarthy 0-4 (4fs); Alan Tynan 1-0; Eoghan Connolly (2f), Oisín O’Donoghue, Jake Morris 0-2 each; Willie Connors, Conor Stakelum, John McGrath, Sam O’Farrell, Darragh Stakelum 0-1 each.	Report; Highlights Rhys Shelly; Michael Breen, Robert Doyle, Ronan Maher (c); Craig Morgan, Eoghan Connolly, Bryan O’Mara; Willie Connors, Conor Stakelum; Jake Morris, Andrew Ormond, Oisín O’Donoghue; Stefan Tobin, John McGrath, Jason Forde; Subs: Darragh McCarthy for Tobin (h-t), Noel McGrath for J McGrath (41), Alan Tynan for Stakelum (46), Darragh Stakelum for Forde (54), Sam O’Farrell for Connors (58).	Alan Connolly 0-7 (5fs); William Buckley 0-6 (1f); Darragh Fitzgibbon, Shane Barrett, Barry Walsh 0-4 each; Tim O’Mahony 0-2 (1f); Brian Hayes, Alan Walsh 0-1 each.

Semple Stadium, Thurles
Referee: Seán Stack (Dublin).
26 April
16:00
Round 2

Waterford	3–24 – 1–30	Tipperary
Stephen Bennett (1-10; 0-7f; 0-1 ‘65); Kevin Mahony (1-2); Jamie Barron (1-1); Calum Lyons (0-3); Dessie Hutchinson and Sean Walsh (0-2 each); Billy Nolan (0-1; 0-1f); Jack Fagan, Jack Prendergast and Sean Mackey (0-1 each)	Report; Highlights Rhys Shelly; Robert Doyle, Eoghan Connolly, Michael Breen; Oisin O’Donoghue, Ronan Maher (c), Bryan O’Mara; Willie Connors, Seamus Kennedy; Jake Morris, Andrew Ormond, Sam O’Farrell; Darragh McCarthy, John McGrath, Alan Tynan. Subs: Craig Morgan for Seamus Kennedy (46); Noel McGrath for Alan Tynan (48); Darragh Stakelum for Sam O’Farrell (49); Stefan Tobin for Andrew Ormond (55); Alan Tynan for Noel McGrath (57); Jason Forde for Darragh McCarthy (59); Peter McGarry for Willie Connors (66)	Darragh McCarthy (0-5; 4f); Andrew Ormond (1-1); John McGrath (0-4); Oisín O'Donoghue 0-4, Eoghan Connolly (0-4; 0-2f; 0-1 ‘65); Jake Morris 0-3, Stefan Tobin and Ronan Maher (0-2 each); Alan Tynan, Willie Connors, Sam O'Farrell, Jason Forde and Darragh Stakelum (0-1 each)

Walsh Park, Waterford
Referee: Chris Mooney (Dublin)
16 May
19:00
Round 3

Tipperary	0–17 – 1–25	Clare
Jake Morris 0-4; Eoghan Connolly (2f), Darragh McCarthy (3f), Jason Forde (1s/l) 0-3 each; Willie Connons, Alan Tynan, Conor Stakelum, Stefan Tobin 0-1 each.	Report; Highlights Rhys Shelly; Michael Breen, Bryan O’Mara, Ronan Maher (c); Eoghan Connolly, Robert Doyle, Craig Morgan; Willie Connors, Alan Tynan; Andrew Ormond, Jake Morris, Oisín O’Donoghue; Darragh McCarthy, John McGrath, Jason Forde; Subs: Darragh Stakelum for Ormond (h-t), Conor Stakelum for Breen (42), Sam O’Farrell for Tynan (48), Stefan Tobin for McCarthy (51), Noel McGrath for Forde (57), Keith Ryan for O’Donoghue (66-f-t, temp).	Diarmuid Stritch 0-6; Ian Galvin 1-2; Tony Kelly 0-5 (4f); Peter Duggan (2s/l, 1f), Seán Rynne 0-4 each; Cathal Malone 0-2; Niall O’Farrell, Ryan Taylor 0-1 each.

Semple Stadium, Thurles
Referee: Thomas Walsh (Waterford)
24 May
16:00
Round 4

Limerick	5–27 – 0–25	Tipperary
Aidan O’Connor (2-7; 1-0 ’65, 0-5 frees); Aaron Gillane (2-0); Diarmaid Byrnes (1-3; 1-0 pen, 0-2 frees); Tom Morrissey (0-4); Gearoid Hegarty, Cathal O’Neill, Cian Lynch, Shane O’Brien (0-2 each); Adam English, Peter Casey, Mike Casey, Darragh O’Donovan, Barry Nash (0-1 each)	Report; Highlights Rhys Shelly; Robert Doyle, Ronan Maher (c), Keith Ryan; Eoghan Connolly, Bryan O’Mara, Séamus Kennedy; Conor Stakelum, Alan Tynan; Oisin O’Donoghue, Jake Morris, Noel McGrath; Darragh McCarthy, John McGrath, Stefan Tobin; Subs: Sam O’Farrell for Tynan (42); Joe Caesar for Kennedy (45); Michael Breen for N McGrath (51); Paddy McCormack for J McGrath (54); Jamie Ormond for McCarthy (61); Brian McGrath for K Ryan (temp 68 – full-time)	Darragh McCarthy (0-7 frees); Eoghan Connolly (0-4; 0-2 frees); Conor Stakelum, Stefan Tobin, Jake Morris (0-3 each); Noel McGrath (0-2); Ronan Maher, Paddy McCormack, Sam O’Farrell (0-1 each).

Gaelic Grounds, Limerick
Referee: Colm Lyons (Cork)

=== Final Group Stage Table ===
Pos	Team	Pld	W	D	L	SF	SA	Diff	Pts	Qualification
1	Cork	4	4	0	0	4-107	3-84	+26	8	Advance to Munster Final
2	Limerick (C)	4	3	0	1	10-109	5-85	+39	6	Advance to Munster Final
3	Clare	4	2	0	2	5-90	7-98	-14	4	Advance to All-Ireland Quarter-Finals
4	Waterford	4	0	1	3	9-90	6-118	–19	1	
5	Tipperary	4	0	1	3	2-94	9-105	–32	1	

== Awards ==
The PwC All-Star Awards

The nominations for the PwC All-Stars were announced on 23 September with Tipperary receiving no nominations in the 45-player shortlist.

== Retirements ==
On 3 November 2026, Seamus Kennedy announced his retirement from inter-county hurling after 11 years with the team and three All-Ireland Senior Hurling Championship medals. In a statement he said "The time is right for me to retire from intercounty hurling, wearing the blue and gold jersey was a dream come true and I feel very fortunate to have had the opportunity to do so."

== 2027 ==
In July 2026, Liam Cahill was ratified as Tipperary senior hurling manager for another three years up to the end of the 2029 season after being handed a two year extension.
