= John Lee (hurler) =

Irish hurler

Personal information
- Born: 23 May 1986 (age 40) Galway, Ireland
- Occupation: Doctor
- Height: 1.95 m (6 ft 5 in)

Sport
- Sport: Hurling
- Position: Centre Back
Club
- Years: Club
- 2003–2013: Liam Mellows
Club titles
- Galway titles: 1
- Leinster titles: 0
- All-Ireland Titles: 0
College
- Years: College
- NUI Galway
College titles
- Fitzgibbon titles: 1
Inter-county
Years	County	Apps (scores)
2007–2011	Galway	18 (0-0)

John Lee (born 23 May 1986) is an Irish hurler who played as a centre-back for the Galway senior hurling team.

An All-Ireland-winning captain in the minor grade, Lee made his first appearance for the senior team during the 2007 championship and became a regular member of the team over the next four seasons. During that time he failed to claim any honours at senior level.

At club level Lee plays with the Liam Mellows club. While a medical student at NUI Galway he won a Fitzgibbon Cup in 2010, having campaigned for the university team for six years, including being part of the side that had lost the 2007 final. He was conferred with a M.B. B.Ch., B.A.O. at a ceremony in the university in June 2010.

Sporting positions
Preceded by Niall Healy	Galway minor hurling team captain 2004	Succeeded by Andrew Keary
Achievements
Preceded by Richie Power (Kilkenny)	All-Ireland Minor Hurling Final winning captain 2004	Succeeded by Andrew Keary (Galway)
