= John Culkin =

John Culkin may refer to:

- John M. Culkin (1928–1993), American academic, media scholar and critic
- John Culkin (hurler) (born 1981), Irish hurler
- John H. Culkin (1887–1951), American politician, educator, and lawyer
