= Stefan Tobin =

Irish hurler

Personal information
- Native name: Stíofán Tóibín (Irish)
- Born: 2007 (age 18–19) Carrick-on-Suir; County Tipperary, Ireland
- Occupation: Apprentice electrician

Sport
- Sport: Hurling
- Position: Right corner-forward
Club
- Years: Club
- 2025–present: Carrick Swans
Club titles
- Tipperary titles: 0
Inter-county*
| Years | County | Apps (scores) |
| 2026–present | Tipperary | 1 (0-00) |
Inter-county titles
- Munster titles: 0
- All-Irelands: 0
- NHL: 0
- All Stars: 0
- *Inter County team apps and scores correct as of 22:23, 17 April 2026.

Stefan Tobin (born 2007) is an Irish hurler. At club level he plays with Carrick Swans and at inter-county level with the Tipperary senior hurling team.

== Career ==
Tobin was educated at Carrick-on-Suir CBS and played in all grades of hurling during his time there, including the Dr Harty Cup. At club level, he first played for Carrick Swans at juvenile and underage levels. Tobin won a South Tipperary SHC medal in 2025, following a 1–17 to 0–15 win over Killenaule in the final.

At inter-county level, Tobin first played for Tipperary during a two-year tenure with the minor team. His last game in the grade saw Tipperary beat Kilkenny by 2–17 to 3–12 in the 2024 All-Ireland MHC final. Tobin immediately progressed to the under-20 team. He was a member of the extended panel when Tipperary once again beat Kilkenny to win the All-Ireland U20HC title in 2025.

Tobin made his senior team debut in a National Hurling League game against Galway in January 2026.

On 19 April 2026, he made his Championship debut for Tipperary when he started against Cork in the first round of the 2026 Munster Senior Hurling Championship.

== Career statistics ==
As of 21 March 2026

| Team | Year | National League | | | Munster | | All-Ireland | | Total | |
| Team | Year | Division | Apps | Score | Apps | Score | Apps | Score | Apps | Score |
|---|---|---|---|---|---|---|---|---|---|---|
| Tipperary | 2026 | Division 1A | 2 | 0-04 | 0 | 0-00 | 0 | 0-00 | 2 | 0-04 |
| Career total | | | 2 | 0-04 | 0 | 0-00 | 0 | 0-00 | 2 | 0-04 |

== Honours ==
Carrick Swans

- South Tipperary Senior Hurling Championship (1): 2025

Tipperary

- All-Ireland Under-20 Hurling Championship (1): 2025
- Munster Under-20 Hurling Championship (1): 2025
- All-Ireland Minor Hurling Championship (1): 2024
- Munster Minor Hurling Championship (1): 2024
