= 2009 All-Ireland Minor Hurling Championship =

All-Ireland Minor Hurling Championship 2009
Championship Details
- Dates: 12 April 2009 - 6 September 2009
- Teams: 25

All Ireland Champions
- Winners: Galway (8th win)
- Captain: Richie Cummins
- Manager: Mattie Murphy

All Ireland Runners-up
- Runners-up: Kilkenny
- Captain: Canice Maher
- Manager: Richie Mulrooney

Provincial Champions
- Munster: Waterford
- Leinster: Kilkenny
- Ulster: Antrim
- Connacht: Not Played

Championship Statistics
- Top Scorer: John O'Dwyer (4-37)

The 2009 All-Ireland Minor Hurling Championship was the 78th staging of the All-Ireland Minor Hurling Championship since its establishment by the Gaelic Athletic Association in 1928. The championship began on 12 April 2009 and ended on 6 September 2009.

Kilkenny entered the championship as the defending champions.

On 6 September 2009, Galway won the championship after a 2-15 to 2-11 defeat of Kilkenny in the All-Ireland final. This was their 8th championship title overall and their first title since 2005.

Tipperary's John O'Dwyer was the championship's top scorer with 4-37.

== Results ==
=== Leinster Minor Hurling Championship ===
Round 1

| 11 April 2009 Round 1 | Westmeath | 3-15 - 2-12 | Kildare | Lakepoint Park, Mullingar |
| | B O'Meara 2-9, D Gavin 1-0, C Boyle 0-2, G Flynn 0-2, S Boylan 0-1, P Reilly 0-1. | | M Fitzgerald 1-8, C Kenny 1-1, L O'Reilly 0-1, E Doyle 0-1, C O'Hehir 0-1. | Referee: T Anderson (Offaly) |

| 11 April 2009 Round 1 | Meath | 7-21 - 1-08 | Wicklow | Páirc Tailteann, Navan |
| | E Lynch 1-9, C Falttery 2-1, A Healy 2-0, K Keena 1-3, R Hatton 1-3, C Byrne 0-1, E Mars 0-1, K Keoghan 0-1, S Brennan 0-1. | | T Cash 0-5, J O'Brien 1-0, A Murphy 0-1, K Byrne 0-1, J Manley 0-1. | Referee: F Devereux (Kildare) |

Round 2

| 2 May 2009 Round 2 | Westmeath | 3-09 - 2-06 | Carlow | Lakepoint Park, Mullingar |
| | A Price 1-3, B O'Meara 1-3, S Boylan 1-0, G Flynn 0-2, A McGrath 0-1. | | R Deegan 1-4, M Cantwell 1-0, J Doyle 0-1, JM Nolan 0-1. | Referee: C Groome Offaly) |

| 2 May 2009 Round 2 | Meath | 1-11 - 4-11 | Laois | Páirc Tailteann, Navan |
| | R Hatton 1-3, M O'Sullivan 0-4, K Keoghan 0-2, S Moran 0-1, D Magee 0-1. | | N Foyle 3-5, W Dunphy 1-1, D King 0-3, D Bergin 0-1, T Ryan 0-1. | Referee: G McGrath (Dublin) |

Quarter-finals

| 2 May 2009 Quarter-final | Kilkenny | 4-18 - 1-08 | Offaly | Nowlan Park, Kilkenny |
| | C Maher 1-3, C Kenny 0-6, W Walsh 1-2, G Aylward 1-1, J Cassion 1-0, R Doyle 0-2, S Kehoe 0-2, J Gannon 0-1, L Harney 0-1. | | T Carroll 1-4, K Connolly 0-2, D Morkan 0-1, D King 0-1. |

| 2 May 2009 Quarter-final | Dublin | 1-09 - 1-19 | Wexford | Parnell Park, Dublin |
| | S McGrath 0-7, O Ó Maoiléidigh 1-1, D Sutcliffe 0-1. | | N Murphy 0-7, I Byrne 1-1, L Óg McGovern 0-4, C Doyle 0-4, D O'Keeffe 0-1, B Doyle 0-1, P Farrell 0-1. |

Round 3

| 16 May 2009 Round 3 | Laois | 1-09 - 1-06 | Dublin | O'Moore Park, Portlaoise |
| | N Foyle 0-7, W Dunphy 1-1, D King 0-1. | | N Rearden 1-0, S McGrath 0-2, D Murphy 0-2, O Ó Maoiléidigh 0-2. | Referee: S Cleere (Kilkenny) |

| 16 May 2009 Round 3 | Westmeath | 1-10 – 1-07 | Offaly | Cusack Park, Mullingar |
| | B O'Meara (0-4 frees), C O'Brien (1-0), G Flynn (0-2), A McGrath (0-1 free), S Boylan (0-1), A Price (0-1), N Dowdall (0-1). | (report) | D King (1-0 free), K Connolly (0-2, 0-1 free), T Spain (0-2 frees), B Murphy (0-1), S Coughlan (0-1), T Carroll (0-1 free). | Referee: A Lagrue (Kildare) |

Semi-finals

| 24 June 2009 Semi-final | Laois | 0-15 – 2-21 | Wexford | O'Moore Park, Portlaoise |
| | N Foyle 0-9, D King 0-3, TJ Lalor 0-1, W Dunphy 0-1, G Burke 0-1. | (report) | I Byrne 1-5, P Farrell 1-2, B Barron 0-4, B Doyle 0-2, L Óg McGovern 0-2, C Clince 0-2, M Maloney 0-1, B Carton 0-1, D O'Keeffe 0-1, M Fanning 0-1. | Referee: D Hughes (Carlow) |

| 24 June 2009 Semi-final | Westmeath | 0-06 – 2-19 | Kilkenny | Cusack Park, Mullingar |
| | B O'Meara 0-5, D Gavin 0-1. | (report) | S Kehoe 1-5, G Aylward 1-1, R Doyle 0-3, W Walsh 0-3, O Walsh 0-2, J Cassin 0-2, G Brennan 0-1, C Kenny 0-1, P Holden 0-1. | Referee: M Bartley (Meath) |

Final

| 5 July 2009 Final | Kilkenny | 1-19 – 0-11 | Wexford | Croke Park, Dublin |
| | S Kehoe 0-11 (5fs), G Aylward 1-1, C Kenny (0-1f), W Walsh 0-2 each, C Maher, O Walsh, M Gaffney 0-1 each. | (report) | B Barron 0-6 (6f), L Og McGovern 0-4 (1f), D O'Keeffe 0-1. | Referee: D Hughes (Carlow) |

=== Munster Minor Hurling Championship ===
First round

| 29 April 2009 First round | Waterford | 0-14 – 1-12 | Clare | Fraher Field, Dungarvan |
| | M O'Neill 0-8 (7f), B O'Halloran, P Mahony (2f) 0-3 each. | (report) | C McGrath 1-7 (1-5f), D Keane 0-2, C O'Donnell, E Hanrahan, P O'Connor 0-1 each. | Referee: C Lyons (Cork) |

| 29 April 2009 First round | Limerick | 0-11 – 1-21 | Tipperary | Gaelic Grounds, Limerick |
| | K Downes 0-3, D Hannon, (f, 65',) W Griffin (f) 0-2 each, J Fitzgibbon (f), T O'Callaghan, N Kennedy, C McNamara, 0-1 each. | (report) | R Gleeson, 1-6 (0-1 '45), J O'Dwyer, 0-6 (0-2f, 0-1pen), S Curran 0-3, B Stapleton, 0-2, E Murray, T Butler, D Butler, 0-1 each. | Referee: J Healy (Clare) |

Playoff

| 5 June 2009 Playoff | Limerick | 1-14 – 4-08 | Waterford | Gaelic Grounds, Limerick |
| | W Griffin 0-6 (2Fs), C McNamara 1-2, D Hannon 0-2 (Fs), N Kennedy, K Downes (F), M Ranahan and S Dowling 0-1 each. | | P Mahony 0-6 (5Fs), B O’Halloran, P Prendergast, F Murray and J Dee (side-line cut) 1-0 each. J Dillon 0-2. |

Semi-finals

| 24 June 2009 Semi-final | Clare | 0-12 – 3-09 | Waterford | Cusack Park, Ennis |
| | C McGrath 0-8 (0-4 frees); D O’Halloran 0-2; D Keane, S Golden, 0-1 each. | (report) | I Galgey 1-2; M O’Neill 0-5 (0-4 frees); B O’Halloran 1-0; P Prendergast 1-0; F Murray, J Dillon, 0-1 each. | Referee: D Copps (Cork) |

| 24 June 2009 Semi-final | Cork | 5-17 – 5-17 (aet) | Tipperary | Páirc Uí Chaoimh, Cork |
| | R O’Sullivan (0-1), D Drake (0-7, 3f, 1 65), D Brosnan (1-1), J Coughlan (1-2, 1f), P Haughney (0-1), E O’Sullivan (1-1), J Dineen (0-1), B Hartnett (2-1). | (report) | B Stapleton (1-1, 1 sideline); S Curran (0-2), E Murray (0-4, 2f), J O’Dwyer (2-6, 2f), D Collins (1-2), D Butler (1-1), P Heffernan (0-1). | Referee: M O'Connor (Limerick) |

| 1 July 2009 Semi-final replay | Tipperary | 2-21 – 1-12 | Cork | Semple Stadium, Thurles |
| | J O’Dwyer 0-11 (0-7 frees, 0-1 65); D Collins 1-2; D Butler 1-1; D Maher, M O’Brien 0-2 each; W Ryan, E Murray, A Cleere 0-1 each. | (report) | E O’Sullivan 1-2; D Drake 0-4 (0-2 frees); J Coughlan 0-3 (0-2 frees); D Brosnan, J Dineen, P Houghney 0-1 each. | Referee: G Hoey (Clare) |

Final

| 12 July 2009 Final | Waterford | 0-18 – 1-13 | Tipperary | Semple Stadium, Thurles |
| | M O'Neill 0-10 (6f, 1 '65), P Mahoney (1f), P Prendergast 0-2 each, F Murray, B O'Halloran, R Cahill, I Galgey 0-1 each. | (report) | J O'Dwyer 1-6 (1-5f), R Gleeson 0-2, A Hogan, A Cleere, S Curran, E Murray, T Butler 0-1 each. | Referee: C Lyons (Cork) |

=== Ulster Minor Hurling Championship ===
First round

| 16 May 2009 First round | Monaghan | 1-07 - 0-10 (aet) | Fermanagh | Irvinestown |
| | | | S Curran 0-5, F McBrien 0-2, O Boyle 0-1, J Gallagher 0-1, M Fee 0-1. |

| 23 May 2009 First round | Donegal | 0-04 - 3-25 | Armagh | Watty Graham Park, Maghera |
| | C Mathewson 0-3, P Browne 0-1. |

| 27 May 2009 First round replay | Monaghan | 1-07 - 3-09 | Fermanagh | Pearse Park, Ballybay |
| | | | J Duffy 1-4, E Markey 1-2, M Fee 1-0, R Porteous 0-1, O Boyle 0-1, S Curran 0-1. |

Quarter-finals

| 6 June 2009 Quarter-final | Derry | 2-11 - 1-09 | Armagh | Casement Park, Belfast |
| | M McGlade 1-2, E McKillion 1-0, S Farren 0-3, O O'Doherty 0-2, C Gilmore 0-1, A Grant 0-1, C O'Kane 0-1, H O'Neill 0-1. | | C Corvan 0-5, C McKee 1-1, P Heaney 0-1, T Hegarty 0-1, M Lennon 0-1. |

| 14 June 2009 Quarter-final | Down | 3-14 - 0-02 | Fermanagh | Casement Park, Belfast |
| | C Dorian 0-8, N Torney 2-1, D Toner 1-1, D Johnston 0-1, D Hughes 0-1, M Teague 0-1, M Conlon 0-1. | | S Curran 0-2. | Referee: P McCaffrey (Antrim) |

Semi-finals

| 21 June 2009 Semi-final | Derry | 3-15 - 1-09 | Down | Casement Park, Belfast |
| | P Kelly 2-1, M McGlade 1-3, S Farren 0-5, C O'Kane 0-3, E McKillion 0-2, A Grant 0-1. | | E McMullan 1-1, C Dorian 0-3, M Cunningham 0-2, D Toner 0-1, D Johnston 0-1, N Torney 0-1. | Referee: L McAuley (Antrim) |

Final

| 28 June 2009 Final | Antrim | 4-16 – 0-09 | Derry | Casement Park, Dublin |
| | C McCann 2-3, S Beattie 1-3, M Devlin 0-4, (2f, 0-1 pen), C Clarke 1-1 (1f), M Lismore 0-2, D McKinley, S Shannon, C Duffin 0-1 each. | (report) | C O'Kane 0-3 (2f), S Farren 0-2, P Kelly, O O'Doherty, M McGlade, D McCusker 0-1 each. | Referee: D Magee (Down) |

=== All-Ireland Minor Hurling Championship ===
Quarter-finals

| 25 July 2009 Quarter-final | Galway | 4-23 – 0-10 | Antrim | Parnell Park, Dublin |
| | R Cummins 2-2, N Burke 0-8 (4f 2 '65s), B Flaherty 1-5, R Badger 1-1, D Glennon 0-2, T Haran (sideline), J Cooney, C Cooney, S Moloney, J Grealish 0-1 each. | (report) | M Devlin (2f), S Shannon (1f), C McCann 0-2 each, C Clarke (0-1f), M Lismore, D McPeake, S Smyth 0-1 each. | Referee: S Whelan (Wexford) |

| 25 July 2009 Quarter-final | Tipperary | 0-20 – 0-19 (aet) | Wexford | O'Moore Park, Portlaoise |
| | E Murray 0-9 (0-5fs, 0-1 '65'); D Maher, S Curran, T Butler 0-2 each; B Stapleton, A Hogan, R Gleeson, M O'Brien, A Cleere 0-1 each. | (report) | G Moore 0-6f; D O'Keeffe 0-5 (0-1 sl); L Óg McGovern 0-3; B Barron, C Goff, B Doyle, A Kenny, J Hobbs 0-1 each. | Referee: A Kelly (Galway) |

Semi-finals

| 9 August 2009 Semi-final | Kilkenny | 1-21 – 2-16 | Tipperary | Croke Park, Dublin |
| | G Brennan, R Kehoe (4f) 0-5 each, W Walsh 1-2, M Gaffney (1f), R Doyle (2 '65s) 0-2 each, C Kenny, O Walsh, C Buckley, G Aylward, C Maher 0-1 each. | (report) | J O'Dwyer 1-8 (0-7f), D Collins 1-1, S Curran 0-3, E Murray 0-2, B Stapleton, T Butler 0-1 each. | Referee: D O'Driscoll (Limerick) |

| 16 August 2009 Semi-final | Galway | 2-22 – 1-18 | Waterford | Croke Park, Dublin |
| | N Burke 1-8 (6f, 1 '65'), R Badger 1-1, J Regan 0-4, R Cummins, S Maloney 0-3 each, D Glennon 0-2, J Grealish 0-1. | (report) | M O'Neill 0-9 (7f, 1 '65'), B O'Halloran 0-5, Paudie Mahony 1-2, F Murray 0-2 (l line ball). | Referee: T Carroll (Offaly) |

Final

| 6 September 2009 Final | Galway | 2-15 – 2-11 | Kilkenny | Croke Park, Dublin |
| | R Cummins 2-1, N Burke 0-4 (0-3f, 0-1 ‘65), S Moloney 0-3 (0-1f, 0-1 ‘65) J Grealish, D Glennon, D Fox 0-2 each, T Haran 0-1. | | M Gaffney 1-3 (0-3f), C Buckley 1-2, C Kenny 0-2, S Kehoe, W Walsh, O Walsh, C Maher 0-1 each. | Referee: J McGrath (Westmeath) |

== Championship statistics ==
=== Top scorers ===
Top scorer overall

| Rank | Player | Club | Tally | Total | Matches | Average |
|---|---|---|---|---|---|---|
| 1 | John O'Dwyer | Tipperary | 4-37 | 49 | 5 | 9.80 |
| 2 | Martin O'Neill | Waterford | 0-32 | 32 | 5 | 6.40 |
| 3 | Barry O'Meara | Westmeath | 3-21 | 30 | 4 | 7.50 |
| 4 | Niall Burke | Galway | 1-20 | 23 | 3 | 7.66 |
| 5 | Seán Kehoe | Kilkenny | 1-19 | 22 | 5 | 4.40 |
| 6 | Richie Cummins | Galway | 4-06 | 18 | 3 | 6.00 |
| 6 | Conor McGrath | Clare | 1-15 | 18 | 2 | 9.00 |
| 8 | Walter Walsh | Kilkenny | 2-10 | 16 | 5 | 3.20 |
| 8 | Pauric Mahony | Waterford | 1-13 | 16 | 5 | 3.20 |
| 10 | Brian O'Halloran | Waterford | 2-09 | 15 | 5 | 3.00 |

=== Miscellaneous ===
- Waterford won the Munster Championship for the first time since 1992.
