= 1999 All-Ireland Minor Hurling Championship =

All-Ireland Minor Hurling Championship 1999
Championship Details
- Dates: 24 April 1999 - 12 September 1999
- Teams: 17

All Ireland Champions
- Winners: Galway (4th win)
- Captain: John Culkin
- Manager: John Hardiman

All Ireland Runners-up
- Runners-up: Tipperary
- Captain: Damien Young
- Manager: Paudie Butler

Provincial Champions
- Munster: Tipperary
- Leinster: Kilkenny
- Ulster: Antrim
- Connacht: Not Played

Championship Statistics
- Top Scorer: Eoin Kelly (1-21)

The 1999 All-Ireland Minor Hurling Championship was the 69th staging of the All-Ireland Minor Hurling Championship since its establishment by the Gaelic Athletic Association in 1928. The championship began on 24 April 1999 and ended on 12 September 1999.

Cork entered the championship as the defending champions, however, they were beaten by Clare in the Munster semi-final.

On 12 September 1999, Galway won the championship following a 0-13 to 0-10 defeat of Tipperary in the All-Ireland final. This was their fourth All-Ireland title overall and their first title in 1994.

Tipperary's Eoin Kelly was the championship's top scorer with 1-21.

== Results ==
=== Leinster Minor Hurling Championship ===
Group stage

Team	Matches				Score			Pts
Team	Pld	W	D	L	For	Against	Diff	Pts
Laois	3	2	0	1	1-29	3-27	-4	4
Westmeath	3	2	0	1	6-27	4-30	3	4
Offaly	1	1	1	1	1-33	1-28	5	3
Dublin	3	0	1	2	0-25	3-33	-17	1

24 April 1999 Round 1	Laois	1-10 - 2-05	Westmeath	O'Moore Park, Portlaoise
	G Cuddy 1-0, O Bergin 0-3, B McCormack 0-2, C Byrne 0-2, D Kelly 0-1, E Browne 0-1, C Coonan 0-1.		D Bateman 1-0, P Gorman 1-0, G Gavin 0-2, J McGuinness 0-1, V Bateman 0-1, N Williams 0-1.	Referee: P Dunphy

24 April 1999 Round 1	Offaly	0-10 - 0-10	Dublin	O'Connor Park, Tullamore
	D Murray 0-7, S Cunningham 0-2, S Ormond 0-1.		G Joyce 0-3, S McCann 0-2, C Keaney 0-1, D Heffernan 0-1, S O'Neill 0-1, K Fitzpatrick 0-1, E McInerney 0-1.	Referee: J Walsh (Kilkenny)

8 May 1999 Round 2	Westmeath	1-12 - 0-10	Offaly	Cusack Park, Mullingar
	C Whyte 0-4, E Loughlin 0-4, K Brazil 1-0, V Bateman 0-2, G Gavin 0-1, P Gorman 0-1.		D Murray 0-6, B Carroll 0-2, D Tanner 0-1, S Cunningham 0-1.

8 May 1999 Round 2	Dublin	0-09 - 0-13	Laois	Parnell Park, Dublin
	C Keaney 0-4, C Rabbitte 0-3, S O'Neill 0-1, D Heffernan 0-1.		B McCormack 0-8, D O'Connell 0-1, C Byrne 0-1, D Kelly 0-1, S Dwyer 0-1, D Campion 0-1.	Referee: J McGrath (Westmeath)

22 May 1999 Round 3	Westmeath	3-10 - 0-06	Dublin	Cusack Park, Mullingar
	V Bateman 1-1, N Williams 1-1, P Gorman 1-1, K Brazil 0-3, G Gavin 0-2, C Whyte 0-1, G Fagan 0-1.		G Joyce 0-3, S McCann 0-2, S O'Neill 0-1.

22 May 1999 Round 3	Offaly	1-13 - 0-06	Laois	St. Brendan's Park, Birr
	D Murray 0-5, G Kelly 1-1, B Carroll 0-2, S Cunningham 0-2, J Larkin 0-2, M Cordial 0-1.		C Byrne 0-2, J Phelan 0-2, B McCormack 0-2.

Semi-finals

26 June 1999 Semi-final	Westmeath	1-05 - 1-07	Kilkenny	Cusack Park, Mullingar
	K Brennan 1-0, C Whyte 0-2, V Bateman 0-2, G Gavin 0-1.		E Walsh 1-1, M Phelan 0-2, K Rafter 0-1, P Reid 0-1, E McCormack 0-1, C O'Neill 0-1.	Referee: J Kelly (Wexford)

3 July 1999 Semi-final	Laois	1-08 - 2-10	Wexford	O'Moore Park, Portlaoise
	B McCormack 0-7, C Byrne 1-0, J Phelan 0-1.		D Mythen 1-2, R Freeman 1-1, L O'Connell 0-4, R Barry 0-1, D Stamp 0-1, B Lambert 0-1.	Referee: J Guinan (Kilkenny)

Finals

11 July 1999 Final	Kilkenny	0-13 - 0-13	Wexford	Croke Park, Dublin
	M Phelan 0-5, Gordon Byrne 0-3, K Rafter 0-2, E Walsh 0-1, Gerry Byrne 0-1, T Murphy 0-1.		L O'Connell 0-6, D Mythen 0-3, R Freeman 0-2, MJ Furlong 0-1, P Doyle 0-1.	Referee: B Kelly (Westmeath)

16 July 1999 Final	Kilkenny	2-13 - 1-11	Wexford	Dr. Cullen Park, Carlow
	M Phelan 1-3, K Rafter 1-1, D Brennan 0-3, C Hickey 0-2, G Byrne 0-2, E Walsh 0-1, G Byrne 0-1.		J Goggins 1-1, R Freeman 0-3, L O'Connell 0-2, D Mythen 0-2, JJ Doyle 0-1, A O'Leary 0-1, B Lambert 0-1.	Referee: B Kelly (Westmeath)

=== Munster Minor Hurling Championship ===
First round

First round	Cork	w/o - scr.	Kerry

28 April 1999 First round	Limerick	2-12 - 1-12	Waterford	Semple Stadium, Thurles
	M Keane 0-6, J Dillon 1-1, K Holmes 1-0, D Reale 0-3, B Mann 0-1, C Fitzgerald 0-1.		E Kelly 1-6, J Mullane 0-2, J O'Leary 0-1, D O'Brien 0-1, J Kennedy 0-1, S Barron 0-1.	Referee: T O'Sullivan (Clare)

Semi-finals

12 May 1999 Semi-final	Clare	2-16 - 2-12	Cork	Gaelic Grounds, Limerick
	G McPhillips 1-7, A Quinn 1-0, B Culbert 0-3, T Griffin 0-2, R Liddane 0-1, C Plunkett 0-1, T Carmody 0-1, A O'Brien 0-1.		J Egan 1-4, M Fitzgerald 0-5, C Brosnan 1-1, J Flavin 0-2.	Referee: S Roche (Tipperary)

12 May 1999 Semi-final	Tipperary	3-20 - 1-14	Limerick	Semple Stadium, Thurles
	D Shelly 1-4, E Kelly 0-5, D Gleeson 1-1, D McGrath 1-0, C Houlihan 0-3, E Brislane 0-3, K Cummins 0-1, C Ryan 0-1, S Mason 0-1, J O'Brien 0-1.		C Fitzgerald 0-7, K Holmes 1-2, M Keane 0-5.	Referee: D Kirwan (Cork)

Final

4 July 1999 Final	Tipperary	1-13 - 2-07	Clare	Semple Stadium, Thurles
	K Cummins 1-3, E Kelly 0-5, C Ryan 0-3, S Mason 0-1, E Brislane 0-1.		B Culbert 1-0, R Liddane 1-0, G McPhillips 0-3, T Griffin 0-1, A Cronin 0-1, A Quinn 0-1, T Carmody 0-1.	Referee: G Harrington (Cork)

=== Ulster Minor Hurling Championship ===
Semi-finals

13 June 1999 Semi-final	Down	1-13 - 0-14	Derry	Casement Park, Belfast
	P Braniff 0-9, N Magee 1-2, F Clarke 0-2.		C Bruton 0-6, E Cushenan 0-4, P Hearty 0-2, T Conway 0-1, P Doherty 0-1.	Referee: S Quinn (Tyrone)

19 June 1999 Semi-final	Antrim	9-17 - 0-03	Armagh	Casement Park, Belfast
	G Connolly 4-0, K Elliott 2-4, M McClements 2-1, C Herron 1-1, K Grieve 0-4, B Quinn 0-3, C McLarnon 0-2, M Scullion 0-1, D McAuley 0-1.		B McCormack 0-2, P Quigley 0-1.	Referee: R Quinn (Derry)

Final

10 July 1999 Final	Antrim	2-13 - 0-03	Down	Casement Park, Belfast
	JB McGuckian 2-1, B Quinn 0-3, M Hamilton 0-3, J McAuley 0-2, G Cunningham 0-2, C McLarnon 0-1, L Bailey 0-1.		P Braniff 0-2, C Keating 0-1.	Referee: R Quinn (Derry)

=== All-Ireland Minor Hurling Championship ===
Quarter-finals

24 July 1999 Quarter-final	Wexford	2-17 - 1-09	Antrim	Parnell Park, Dublin
	J Goggins 1-3, D Mythen 0-4, B Lambert 1-0, T Freeman 0-3, A O'Leary 0-3, L O'Connell 0-3, D Stamp 0-1.		G Bell 0-4, B McNaughton 1-0, K Elliot 0-2, G Cunningham 0-1, G Armstrong 0-1, B Quinn 0-1.	Referee: G Harrington (Cork)

25 July 1999 Quarter-final	Galway	5-11 - 1-10	Clare	Croke Park, Dublin
	C Coen 2-4, D Forde 2-2, M Coughlan 1-1, R Murray 0-1, D Hayes 0-1, K Brady 0-1, C Dervan 0-1.		G McPhillips 1-3, B Kennedy 0-3, D McMahon 0-2, T Carmody 0-1, A Quinn 0-1.	Referee: B Kelly (Westmeath)

Semi-finals

8 August 1999 Semi-final	Tipperary	3-13 - 1-08	Wexford	Croke Park, Dublin
	E Kelly 1-5, J O'Brien 1-3, D Shelly 1-1, D Gleeson 0-2, E Brislane 0-1, T King 0-1.		D Stamp 1-0, L O'Connell 0-3, D Mythen 0-2, R Freeman 0-2, D Conway 0-1.	Referee: E Morris (Dublin)

15 August 1999 Semi-final	Galway	1-18 - 3-09	Kilkenny	Croke Park, Dublin
	R Murray 0-7, C Coen 1-2, D Forde 0-5, K Brady 0-2, H Whiriskey 0-2.		G Byrne 1-4, T Murphy 1-1, K Rafter 1-0, E Walsh 0-2, A Fogarty 0-1, M Phelan 0-1.	Referee: J McLean (Antrim)

Final

12 September 1999 Final	Galway	0-13 - 0-10	Tipperary	Croke Park, Dublin
	R Murray 0-5, D Forde 0-2, G Farragher 0-2, C Coen 0-2, K Brady 0-1, C Dervan 0-1.		E Kelly 0-6, E Brislaen 0-2, T King 0-1, D Shelly 0-1.	Referee: P Ahern (Carlow)

== Championship statistics ==
=== Top scorers ===
Top scorer overall

Rank	Player	Club	Tally	Total	Matches	Average
1	Eoin Kelly	Tipperary	1-21	24	4	6.00
2	Gareth McPhillips	Clare	2-13	19	3	6.33
2	Brian McCormack	Laois	0-19	19	4	4.75
3	Damien Murray	Offaly	0-18	18	3	6.00
3	Leon O'Connell	Wexford	0-18	18	5	3.60
4	Cathal Coen	Galway	3-08	17	3	5.66
5	Des Mythen	Wexford	1-13	16	5	3.20
6	David Forde	Galway	2-09	15	3	5.00
7	Michael Phelan	Kilkenny	1-11	14	4	3.50
8	Richie Murray	Galway	0-13	13	3	4.33

Top scorers in a single game

Rank	Player	Club	Tally	Total	Opposition
1	Gareth Connolly	Antrim	4-00	12	Armagh
2	Kevin Elliott	Antrim	2-04	10	Armagh
2	Cathal Coen	Galway	2-04	10	Clare
2	Gareth McPhillips	Clare	1-07	10	Cork
3	Eoin Kelly	Waterford	1-06	9	Limerick
3	Paul Braniff	Down	0-09	9	Derry
4	David Forde	Galway	2-02	8	Clare
4	Eoin Kelly	Tipperary	1-05	8	Wexford
4	Brian McCormack	Laois	0-08	8	Dublin
5	Mickey McClements	Antrim	2-01	7	Armagh
5	J. B. McGuckian	Antrim	2-01	7	Down
5	James Egan	Cork	1-04	7	Clare
5	Donal Shelley	Tipperary	1-04	7	Limerick
5	Gordon Byrne	Kilkenny	1-04	7	Galway
5	Damien Murray	Offaly	0-07	7	Dublin
5	Brian McCormack	Laois	0-07	7	Wexford
5	Conor Fitzgerald	Limerick	0-07	7	Tipperary
5	Richie Murray	Galway	0-07	7	Kilkenny
