= Richie Cummins =

Irish sportsman

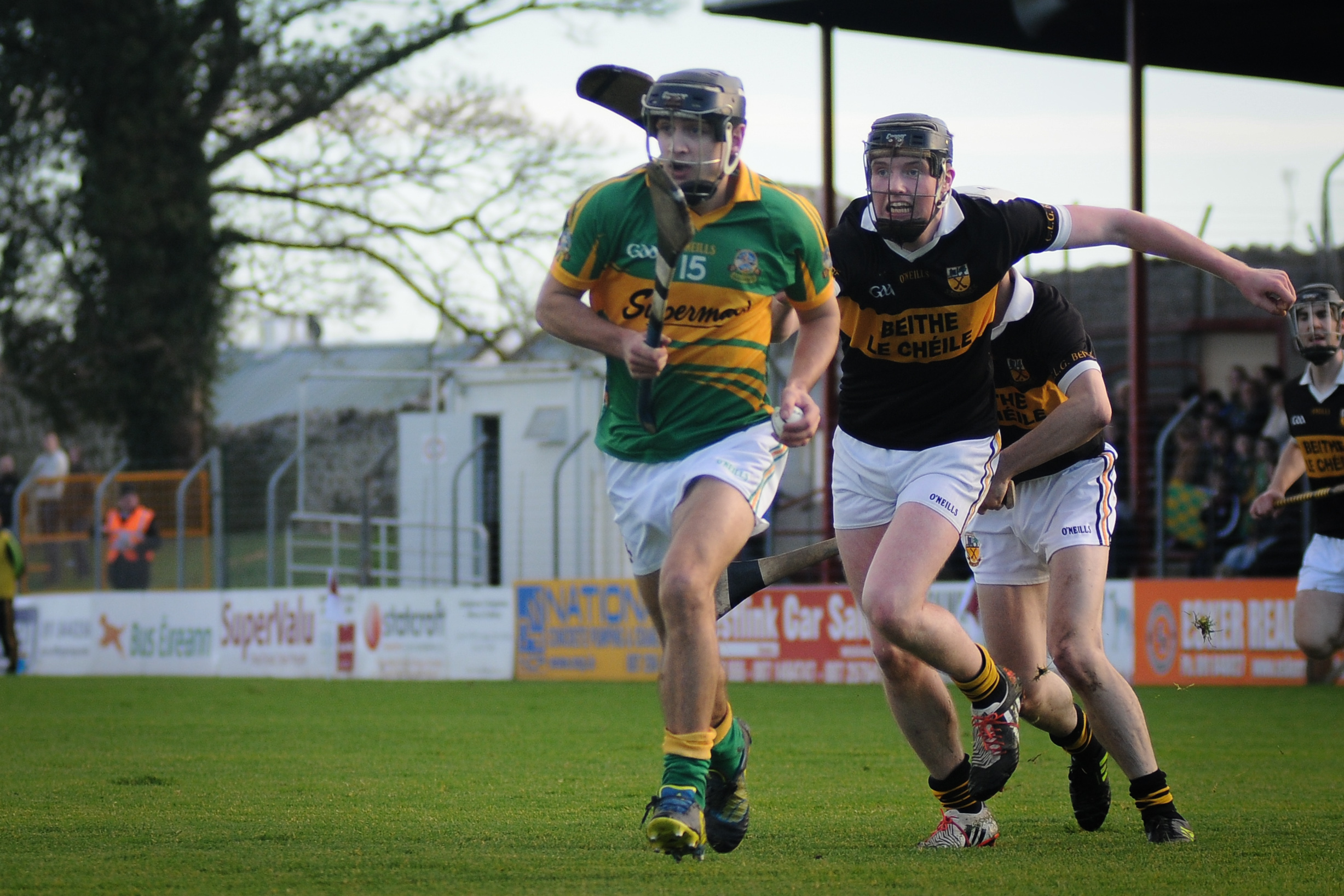
- Richie Cummins (middle) in 2014

Personal information
- Native name: Risteárd Ó Cuimin (Irish)
- Born: 1991 (age 34–35) Gort, County Galway, Ireland
- Height: 1.8 m (5 ft 11 in)

Sport
- Sport: Hurling
- Position: Right corner forward
Club
- Years: Club
- 2008–: Gort
Club titles
- Galway titles: 1
Inter-county
- Years: County
- 2010: Galway

Richie Cummins (born 1991 in Gort, County Galway) is an Irish sportsman. He plays hurling with his local club Gort and was a member of the Galway minor inter-county team from 2008 until 2009. Cummins captained Galway to the All-Ireland minor title in 2009.

Sporting positions
Preceded by David Burke	Galway minor hurling team captain 2009	Succeeded by Daithí Burke
Achievements
Preceded by Thomas Breen	All-Ireland MHC winning captain 2009	Succeeded by Cillian Buckley
