= Darragh Hickey =

Irish hurler

Personal information
- Born: 1986 (age 39–40) Boherlahan, County Tipperary, Ireland

Sport
- Sport: Hurling
- Position: Right wing-forward
Club
- Years: Club
- Boherlahan–Dualla
Club titles
- Tipperary titles: 0
Inter-county
- Years: County
- 2007-2008: Tipperary
Inter-county titles
- Munster titles: 1
- All-Irelands: 0
- NHL: 1
- All Stars: 0

Darragh Hickey (born 1986) is an Irish hurler who plays at club level with Boherlahan–Dualla. He is a former member of the Tipperary senior hurling team.

== Playing career ==
Hickey first played hurling at juvenile and underage levels with the Boherlahan–Dualla club, before joining the club's top adult team. He first appeared on the inter-county scene at minor level with Tipperary and won a Munster Championship in 2003 as well as being the championship's top scorer the following year. Hickey later lined out in the 2006 All-Ireland under-21 final defeat by Kilkenny. He was drafted onto the Tipperary senior hurling team in 2007 and won National Hurling League and Munster Championship titles in 2008.

== Career statistics ==
| Team | Year | National League | | | Munster | | All-Ireland | | Total | |
| Team | Year | Division | Apps | Score | Apps | Score | Apps | Score | Apps | Score |
|---|---|---|---|---|---|---|---|---|---|---|
| Tipperary | 2007 | Division 1B | 0 | 0-00 | 0 | 0-00 | 2 | 0-05 | 2 | 0-05 |
| Tipperary | 2008 | Division 1B | 5 | 0-01 | 0 | 0-00 | 0 | 0-00 | 5 | 0-01 |
| Career total | | | 5 | 0-01 | 0 | 0-00 | 2 | 0-05 | 7 | 0-06 |

== Honours ==
Tipperary

- Munster Senior Hurling Championship: 2008
- National Hurling League: 2008
- Munster Under-21 Hurling Championship: 2006
- Munster Minor Hurling Championship: 2003
