= Andrew Keary =

Irish hurler

Personal information
- Native name: Aindriú Ó Ciara (Irish)
- Born: 1987 (age 38–39) Killimor, County Galway, Ireland

Sport
- Sport: Hurling
- Position: Left wing-forward
Club
- Years: Club
- Killimor
Club titles
- Galway titles: 0
Inter-county
Years	County	Apps (scores)
2006-2008	Galway	2 (0-03)
Inter-county titles
- All-Irelands: 0
- NHL: 0
- All Stars: 0

Andrew Keary (born 1987) is an Irish hurler who plays for Galway Championship club Killimor. He previously lined out with the Galway senior hurling team. Keary usually lines out as a forward.

== Career ==
Keary first came to hurling prominence at juvenile and underage levels with the Killimor club, while simultaneously playing as a schoolboy with Portumna Community School. He eventually progressed onto Killimor's top adult team. Keary first appeared on the inter-county scene with the Galway minor hurling team. After winning an All-Ireland MHC title in 2004, he captained the team to a second successive title in 2005. He also won an All-Ireland U21HC title in 2007. Keary was drafted onto the Galway senior hurling team in 2006. He made a number of competitive appearances before being released from the panel in November 2008.

== Career statistics ==
Team	Year	National League			All-Ireland		Total	
Team	Year	Division	Apps	Score	Apps	Score	Apps	Score
Galway	2006	Division 1B	0	0-00	2	0-03	2	0-03
Galway	2007	Division 1B	0	0-00	0	0-00	0	0-00
Galway	2008	Division 1B	3	0-00	0	0-00	3	0-00
Career total			3	0-00	2	0-03	5	0-03

== Honours ==
Galway

- All-Ireland Under-21 Hurling Championship: 2007
- All-Ireland Minor Hurling Championship: 2004, 2005 (c)

Sporting positions
Preceded by John Lee	Galway minor hurling team captain 2005	Succeeded by Joe Canning
Achievements
Preceded by John Lee	All-Ireland Minor Hurling Final winning captain 2005	Succeeded by Joey McLoughney
