= Diarmuid Stritch =

Irish hurler

Personal information
- Native name: Diarmuid Straoit (Irish)
- Born: June 2005 (age 21) Clonlara, County Clare, Ireland
- Occupation: Student

Sport
- Sport: Hurling
- Position: Centre-forward
Club
- Years: Club
- 2023-present: Clonlara
Club titles
- Clare titles: 1
College
- Years: College
- 2025-present: University of Limerick
College titles
- Fitzgibbon titles: 1
Inter-county
- Years: County
- 2025-present: Clare
Inter-county titles
- Munster titles: 0
- All-Irelands: 0
- NHL: 0
- All Stars: 0

Diarmuid Stritch (born 2005) is an Irish hurler. At club level he plays with Clonlara and at inter-county level with the Clare senior hurling team.

== Career ==
Stritch was educated at Ardscoil Rís in Limerick and played hurling at all levels during his time as a student there. He lost finals in the Dean Ryan Cup and Dr Harty Cup competitions, before winning a Dr Croke Cup medal in 2022 after a 1–17 to 0–15 win over St Kieran's College in the All-Ireland PPS SAHC final.

Stritch later studied at the University of Limerick (UL) and was part of the hurling team that won the All-Ireland freshers' title in 2025. He won a Fitzgibbon Cup medal the following year when Ul had a 13-point win over Mary Immaculate College in the final.

At club level, Stritch first played for the Clonlara club at juvenile and underage levels before progressing to adult level. He won a Clare SHC medal in his debut season in 2023, after a 3–18 to 2–16 win over Crusheen in the final.

Stritch first played for Clare during a two-year tenure with the minor team in 2021 and 2022. He immediately progressed to the under-20 team but ended his underage career, having lost three provincial finals in five years. Stritch was drafted onto the senior team in April 2025. He made his debut during the 2026 National Hurling League.

== Career statistics ==
As of 21 March 2026

| Team | Year | National League | | | Munster | | All-Ireland | | Total | |
| Team | Year | Division | Apps | Score | Apps | Score | Apps | Score | Apps | Score |
|---|---|---|---|---|---|---|---|---|---|---|
| Clare | 2025 | Division 1A | — | | 0 | 0-00 | — | | 0 | 0-00 |
| Clare | 2026 | Division 1B | 5 | 0-13 | 0 | 0-00 | 0 | 0-00 | 5 | 0-13 |
| Career total | | | 5 | 0-13 | 0 | 0-00 | 0 | 0-00 | 5 | 0-13 |

== Honours ==
Ardscoil Rís

- Dr Croke Cup (1): 2022

University of Limerick

- Fitzgibbon Cup (1): 2026
- All-Ireland Fresher 1 Hurling Championship (1): 2025

Clonlara

- Clare Senior Hurling Championship (1): 2023

Clare

- National Hurling League Division 1B (1): 2026
