= Cathal O'Reilly =

Irish hurler

Personal information
- Native name: Cathal Ó Raghallaigh (Irish)
- Born: 2007 (age 18–19) Holycross, County Tipperary, Ireland

Sport
- Sport: Hurling
- Position: Right corner-back
Club
- Years: Club
- 2025–present: Holycross–Ballycahill
Club titles
- Tipperary titles: 0
Inter-county
- Years: County
- 2026–: Tipperary
Inter-county titles
- Munster titles: 0
- All-Irelands: 0
- NHL: 0
- All Stars: 0

Cathal O'Reilly (born 2007) is an Irish hurler. At club level, he plays with Holycross–Ballycahill and at inter-county level with the Tipperary senior hurling team.

== Career ==
O'Reilly played hurling at all grades during his time as a student at Coláiste Mhuire in Thurles. He was part of the school team that won the Munster PPS U17HC title in 2023, following a one-point win over Hazelwood College. At club level, O'Reilly first played for Holycross–Ballycahill at juvenile and underage levels and won a Tipperary MAHC medal in 2022.

At inter-county level with Tipperary, O'Reilly captained the minor team to the All-Ireland MHC title, following an extra time 2–17 to 3–12 win over Kilkenny in the final. He was later named on the Minor Team of the Year. O'Reilly immediately progressed to the under-20 team and won an All-Ireland U20HC medal in 2025.

O'Reilly was added to the senior team in 2026. He made his debut against Galway in the 2026 National Hurling League.

=== Inter-county ===
As of 1 February 2026

Team	Year	National League			Munster		All-Ireland		Total	
Team	Year	Division	Apps	Score	Apps	Score	Apps	Score	Apps	Score
Tipperary	2026	Division 1A	2	0-00	0	0-00	0	0-00	2	0-00
Career total			2	0-00	0	0-00	0	0-00	2	0-00

== Honours ==
Holycross–Ballycahill

- Tipperary Minor A Hurling Championship: 2022

Tipperary

- All-Ireland Under-20 Hurling Championship: 2025
- Munster Under-20 Hurling Championship: 2025
- All-Ireland Minor Hurling Championship: 2024
- Munster Minor Hurling Championship: 2024

Sporting positions
Preceded by Jamie Ormond	Tipperary minor hurling team captain 2024	Succeeded by Euan Murray
Achievements
Preceded by Eoghan Gunning	All-Ireland Minor Hurling Final winning captain 2024	Succeeded by James Comerford
