= Brian McCormack (Gaelic footballer) =

Irish hurler and Gaelic footballer

Personal information
- Native name: Brian Mac Cormaic (Irish)
- Nickname: Bruno
- Born: Republic of Ireland

Sport
- Sport: Gaelic football
- Position: Left half back
Club
- Years: Club
- ? -2019: Portlaoise
Club titles
	Football	Hurling
Laois titles	15	1
Leinster titles	2	
Inter-county
- Years: County
- ?- ?: Laois

Brian McCormack is a Gaelic footballer from County Laois.

He plays for the Portlaoise club. He usually plays at wing back for the Laois senior football team.

McCormack emerged on to the inter-county GAA scene in 1997 as part of the Laois minor squad that retained the All-Ireland Minor Football Championship. He captained Portlaoise to the Leinster Club title in 2009.

He has also played for the Laois senior county hurling team.

For Portlaoise against Stradbally in a 2013 league game, he was struck in the mouth from behind and required dental intervention.

He has won 15 Laois Senior Football club titles and 1 Laois Senior Hurling club titles.
