= 2024 All-Ireland Minor Hurling Championship =

2024 hurling competition for players under the age of 17

All-Ireland Minor Hurling Championship 2024
Championship Details
- Dates: 23 March - 29 June 2024
- Teams: 18

All Ireland Champions
- Winners: Tipperary (22nd win)
- Captain: Cathal O'Reilly
- Manager: James Woodlock

All Ireland Runners-up
- Runners-up: Kilkenny
- Captain: Bill McDermott
- Manager: Niall Bergin

Provincial Champions
- Munster: Tipperary
- Leinster: Kilkenny
- Ulster: Not Played
- Connacht: Not Played

Championship Statistics
- Matches Played: 47
- Total Goals: 144 (3.06 per game)
- Total Points: 1438 (30.59 per game)
- Top Scorer: Seán O'Brien (3-67)

The 2024 All-Ireland Minor Hurling Championship was the 94th staging of the All-Ireland Minor Hurling Championship since its establishment by the Gaelic Athletic Association in 1928. The championship ran from 23 March to 29 June 2024.

Clare were the defending champions, however, they were beaten by Kilkenny in the All-Ireland semi-final.

The All-Ireland final was played at UPMC Nowlan Park in Kilkenny on 29 June 2024 between Tipperary and Kilkenny, in what was their first meeting in the final in 22 years. Tipperary won the match after extra time by 2–17 to 3–12 to claim a record 22nd championship title overall and their first title in two years.

Wexford's Seán O'Brien was the championship's top scorer with 3-67.

== Format change ==
On 30 September 2023, Special Congress voted to make some structural changes to the All-Ireland series, resulting in the creation of two new rounds of games. The preliminary quarter-finals will be played between the third and fourth-placed teams in Munster and Leinster, with the two teams from each province playing each other. The winners of those games advance to the All-Ireland quarter-finals against the beaten Munster and Leinster finalists. That draw will be subject to the avoidance of repeat pairings where possible. The Munster and Leinster champions progress straight into the All-Ireland semi-finals.

== Leinster Minor Hurling Championship ==
=== Leinster tier 1 ===
==== Leinster tier 1 group table ====
Advance to Leinster semi-finals Advance to Leinster quarter-finals

Team	Matches				Score			Pts
Team	Pld	W	D	L	For	Against	Diff	Pts
Galway	3	2	0	1	67	71	-4	4
Dublin	3	2	0	1	52	49	3	4
Wexford	3	1	0	2	59	69	-10	2
Kilkenny	3	1	0	2	71	60	11	2

==== Leinster tier 1 results ====
20 April 2024 Round 1	Dublin	0-18 - 0-15	Wexford	Parnell Park
	R Flannery 0-8 (6 frees), C Barrett 0-5 (4 frees), F Codd, T Higgins, C O’Sullivan, F Daly, T Cullen 0-1 each.	Report	S O’Brien 0-10 frees, J Dunne, C Gethings, C Carley, C Sinnott, P Keavey 0-1 each.

20 April 2024 Round 1	Kilkenny	4-24 - 1-14	Galway	UPMC Nowlan Park
	J Mullen 1-9, B McDermott 2-3, P Lacey 1-2, C Holohan 0-4, K Buggy 0-1, J Dollard 0-1, E Cahill 0-1, E Brennan 0-1, O O'Donovan 0-1, J Connery 0-1.	Report	C Roche 1-4(0-3f), C Leen 0-3, B Callanan 0-2, E Mulleady 0-2, J Donnellan 0-1(0-1f), S Keane 0-1, E McGlynn 0-1.

27 April 2024 Round 2	Wexford	2-20 - 1-20	Kilkenny	Chadwicks Wexford Park
	S O’Brien 0-13 (8f, 1 65); D Rossiter (2-0); S Hyland, C Fanning, J Nolan, J Dunne, C Carley, C Gethings (1f), O Moore (1 line ball), 0-1 each.	Report	J Mullen 0-9 (6f); C Holohan 0-5; K Buggy 1-1; E Cahill 0-2; O O’Donovan, J Cody, E Brennan 0-1 each.

27 April 2024 Round 2	Dublin	1-14 - 2-16	Galway	Parnell Park
	R Flannery 1-4 (1-0pen, 0-2f, 0-1 ’65), D Kilduff 0-3, C Quinn, C O’Flynn, F Daly, T Higgins, J Norris, C Barrett, E Brennan 0-1 apiece.	Report	B Callanan 1-4 (0-2f), C Leen 1-2, C Roche 0-3 (3f), E McGlynn, J Ryan 0-2 each, J Donnellan, E Mulleady, R Cahalan 0-1 apiece.

4 May 2024 Round 3	Wexford	1-15 - 3-19	Galway	Chadwicks Wexford Park
	S O'Brien 1-10, C Gethings 0-1, C Sinnott 0-1, J Dunne 0-1, K O'Mahony 0-1, J Kennedy 0-1.	Report	B Callanan 1-9 (0-3f). S. Keane 1-1, C Leen 0-3, S. Moran 1-0, C. Maloney 0-1, S. Kelly 0-1 (0-1f), C Roche 0-1, J Ryan 0-1, R Cahalane 0-1

5 May 2024 Round 3	Kilkenny	0-12 - 0-17	Dublin	UPMC Nowlan Park
	E Brennan 0-4 (4f), J Mullen 0-3 (3f), J Connery, K Buggy, B McDermott, C Holohan, R Doherty 0-1 apiece.	Report	R Flannery 0-11 (8f), K Costello 0-2, B O’Mahony, J Norris, D Kilduff, C Barrett 0-1 apiece.

=== Leinster tier 2 ===
==== Leinster tier 2 group 1 table ====
Advance to Leinster preliminary quarter-finals

Team	Matches				Score			Pts
Team	Pld	W	D	L	For	Against	Diff	Pts
Offaly	4	4	0	0	100	57	43	8
Westmeath	4	3	0	1	129	48	81	6
Antrim	4	2	0	2	98	83	15	4
Meath	4	1	0	3	58	90	-32	2
Wicklow	4	0	0	4	34	141	-107	0

==== Leinster tier 2 group 1 results ====
23 March 2024 Round 1	Westmeath	8-27 - 0-03	Wicklow	TEG Cusack Park
	P Casey 2-3 (0-1f), K Loughlin 0-8 (7f), R Williams 0-7, C McKeogh 2-1, L Meyler 2-0, O McCauley 1-1, D Corrigan 0-3, C Ward 1-0, E Meehan 0-2, D Kenny (f) and B McNamee 0-1 each.	Report	W Cash 0-2f, J Gregan 0-1.	Referee: SM Maher (Offaly)

23 March 2024 Round 1	Meath	1-08 - 1-11	Offaly	Sports Campus Ireland
	L Ennis 0-5, J Curley 1-1, E Curley, R Porter 0-1	Report	O Fletcher 0-6, K Wynne 1-0, J Hennessy 0-2, J Sampson, J O’Sullivan, A Hogan 0-1 each.

30 March 2024 Round 2	Antrim	1-17 - 3-17	Offaly	Darver COE
	F Bradley (0-6, 0-5f), C Donnelly (0-5), C Mooney (0-4), O McCallin (1-0), T McLaughlin (0-2, 0-1f).	Report	O Fletcher (1-9, 0-8f), K Wynne (1-3); B Guinan (1-0), C Egan (0-1), J O’Sullivan (0-1), M Dooley (0-1); O Carroll (0-1), J Hennessy (0-1).

30 March 2024 Round 2	Wicklow	1-14 - 1-17	Meath	Echelon Park
	W Cash (1-6, 6f), A Lifely (0-6, 3f), C O’Toole (0-1), J O’Leary (0-1).	Report	L Ennis (0-10,7f), J Cully (1-1), R Porter (0-2); D Wade (0-1), E Curley (0-1); D Doherty (0-1), D Walsh (0-1).

6 April 2024 Round 3	Antrim	4-19 - 0-04	Wicklow	Darver Centre of Excellence
	F Bradley (1-7, 5f)), O McCallin (1-3), C Johnson (1-2), F Kane (1-1), T McLaughlin (0-2, 1f); L McEnhill (0-2); C Mooney (0-1), L McCallin (0-1).	Report	O Lane (0-1), P Marrinan (0-1), T Brennan (0-1), W Cash (0-1, f).

6 April 2024 Round 3	Meath	0-04 - 3-23	Westmeath	Páirc Tailteann
	L Ennis (2f), D Doherty 0-2 each.	Report	R Williams, E Meehan 1-4 each, K Loughlin 0-6 (5f), D Corrigan 1-1, C McKeogh 0-4, P Casey 0-2, A Flanagan, O McCauley 0-1 each.

20 April 2024 Round 4	Westmeath	1-27 - 2-14	Antrim	TEG Cusack Park
	K Loughlin 0-12 (11f), C McKeogh 0-5, E Meehan 0-4, P Casey 1-0, R Williams 0-2, S Hayes, C Ward, F Higgins, D Corrigan 0-1 each.	Report	F Bradley 0-9 (6f, 1'65'), T McLaughlin 2-2, C Mooney, O McCallin, R Taylor 0-1 each.

20 April 2024 Round 4	Wicklow	1-07 - 3-30	Offaly	Echelon Park
	A Lifely 0-5 T Brennan 1-0, J O'Leary 0-2	Report	O Fletcher, 1-5 4fs K Wynne 1-5 J Hennessy 1-4 S Carey 0-4, A Hogan 0-5, B Guinan 0-2, D Dooley 0-1 M Mitchell, C Egan, J Sampson, J O'Sullivan 0-1.

27 April 2024 Round 5	Meath	1-20 - 1-24	Antrim	Drumree Grounds

27 April 2024 Round 5	Offaly	2-15 - 1-13	Westmeath	Faithful Fields
	K Wynne 1-6 (6f); C Egan 1-1; O Fletcher 0-3 (1f); B Guinan 0-2; A Hogan (f), M Dooley, M Mitchell 0-1 each.	Report	C McKeogh 1-2; K Loughlin 0-5 (5f); R Williams, E Meehan 0-2 each; D Burke, D Corrigan 0-1 each.

==== Leinster tier 2 group 2 table ====
Advance to Leinster preliminary quarter-finals

Team	Matches				Score			Pts
Team	Pld	W	D	L	For	Against	Diff	Pts
Kildare	3	3	0	0	66	47	19	6
Laois	3	2	0	1	56	53	3	4
Kerry	3	1	0	2	53	53	0	2
Carlow	3	0	0	3	41	63	-22	0

==== Leinster tier 2 group 2 results ====
23 March 2024 Round 1	Kildare	4-11 - 0-15	Laois	Hawkfield COE
	T Power 1-5 (0-3 frees, 0-1 '65), C McGrath 2-0, S McLoughlin 1-1, O Byrne 0-1, J Dee 0-1, C Gordon 0-1, P Kenendy 0-1, F Frisby 0-1.	Report	E Delaney 0-5, T Óg Phelan 0-4 (0-4 frees), T Mahoney 0-2 (0-2 frees), E Bracken 0-2, K Cuddy 0-1, D Whelan 0-1.

23 March 2024 Round 1	Carlow	1-09 - 1-17	Kerry	Netwatch Cullen Park
	R Murphy (0-6, 3f, 0-1 penalty), J Brennan (1-0), J Connolly (0-2), R O’Neill (0-1f).	Report	E O’Sullivan (0-8f), J Curtin (1-2), I Conway (0-3, 1 sideline), D Costello (0-2), E O’Flaherty (0-1), R O’Halloran (0-1).

6 April 2024 Round 2	Carlow	0-14 - 2-16	Kildare	Netwatch Carlow Training Centre
	R Murphy 0-11 (0-10 frees), J Brennan 0-1, K Nolan 0-1, C Kavanagh 0-1.	Report	T Power 1-8 (0-5 frees 0-1 65'), F Frisby 0-4, C McGrath 1-0, P Kennedy 0-1, M Owens 0-1, J McNulty 0-1, G Kenny 0-1.

6 April 2024 Round 2	Laois	4-08 - 1-12	Kerry	Laois Hire O'Moore Park
	T Og Phelan 1-6 (0-5 frees), K Cuddy 2-0, R Kavanagh 1-0, E Delaney and M Cunningham 0-1 each.	Report	E O'Sullivan 1-7 (0-7 frees), I Conway 0-2, J Rochford, J Curtin and E O'Flaherty 0-1 each

27 April 2024 Round 3	Laois	3-12 - 0-15	Carlow	Laois Hire O'Moore Park
	T Óg Phelan 1-6 (0-6f); T Mahony, R Deegan 1-0 each; K Cuddy 0-2; E Delaney, S Connolly, E Bracken and C Headen 0-1 each.	Report	R Murphy 0-9 (all frees), S McCarthy 0-2; K Nolan, E Doyle, C Kavanagh and A Wall 0-1 each.

27 April 2024 Round 3	Kildare	2-15 - 1-15	Kerry	Manguard Park
	T Power 1-6 (5 frees); O Byrne 0-3 (1'65); F Frisby 1-0; T Boran 0-2; P Kennedy, J Dee, M Owens, C O'Brien 0-1 each.	Report	E O'Sullivan 0-9 (8 frees); Ivan Conway 1-3; E O Flaherty, J Curtin, J Rochford 0-1 each.

=== Leinster preliminary quarter-finals ===
4 May 2024 Preliminary quarter-final	Offaly	4-16 - 4-13	Laois	Faithful Fields
	C Egan (2-2), K Wynne (0-5, 0-1 free), M Mitchell (1-1), O Fletcher (0-4, 0-3 frees), A Hogan (1-0), M Dooley (0-2), J O'Sullivan, B Guinan (0-1 each).	Report	T Og Phelan (1-5, 1-0 penalty, 0-4 frees), E Delaney (2-1), K Cuddy (1-3), D Whelan, C Brennan, R Deegan, R Kavanagh (0-1 each).

4 May 2024 Preliminary quarter-final	Kildare	1-20 - 1-17	Westmeath	Hawkfield Centre of Excellence
	T Boran 0-5, T Power 0-5 (0-4 frees), C McGrath 1-0, C Dunne 0-2, P Kennedy 0-2, F Frisby 0-2, O Byrne 0-1, O O'Neill 0-1, C O'Brien 0-1, C Knox 0-1.	Report	K Loughlin 0-7 (0-7 frees), C McKeogh 1-4, P Casey 0-3, E Meehan 0-1, R Williams 0-1, M Davis 0-1.

=== Leinster quarter-finals ===
10 May 2024 Quarter-final	Kildare	0-15 - 4-16	Kilkenny	Hawkfield Centre of Excellence
	T Power 0-10, O Byrne 0-3, O O'Neill 0-2.		J Mullen 1-5, B McDermott 0-4, O O'Donovan 1-0, J Cody 1-0, R Doherty 1-0, E Brennan 0-3, C Byrne 0-2, M Rohan 0-1, A Clifford 0-1.

11 May 2024 Quarter-final	Offaly	0-14 - 3-15	Wexford	Faithful Fields
	O Fletcher 0-7 (5f), A Hogan 0-3, J O'Sullivan, K Wynne, C Egan, M Mitchell 0-1 each.	Report	S O'Brien 0-8 (2f and 2 '65s'), S Hyland 1-1, C Fanning 0-3, C Carley and A O'Connell-Byrne 1-0 each, R Donohue, J Dunne, K O'Mahony 0-1 each.

=== Leinster semi-finals ===
18 May 2024 Semi-final	Dublin	1-17 - 2-10	Wexford	Parnell Park
	R Flannery 0-9 (8f); D Kilduff 1-3; F Codd, E Brennan, K Costello, O Brennan, S Bolger 0-1 apiece.	Report	S O’Brien 1-6 (0-6f); D Rossiter 1-0; C Carley 0-2; K O’Mahony, J Kennedy 0-1 apiece.

19 May 2024 Semi-final	Galway	1-12 - 4-18	Kilkenny	Faithful Fields
	B Callanan 0-3 (0-2f), C Leen 0-3, C Roche 1-0, R Cahalan, S Moran, E Mulleady, S Keane, C Maloney, J Ryan 0-1 each.	Report	J Mullen 2-6 (0-5f), O O’Donovan 2-1, C Holohan, E Brennan (0-1f) 0-3 each, B McDermott, A Clifford, J Cody, K Buggy 0-1, R Doherty 0-1 each.

=== Leinster final ===
25 May 2024 Final	Dublin	1-09 - 1-13	Kilkenny	Laois Hire O'Moore Park
	Eoghan Brennan 1-0, Rory Flannery 0-3 (2fs, ‘65), Tommy Cullen 0-2, Cathal O’Flynn, Darragh Kilduff, Tom Higgins, and Killian Costello 0-1 each.	Report	Jake Mullen 0-7 (5fs), Ollie O’Donovan 1-0, Robbie Doherty 0-2, Oisin Henderson, David Barcoe, Conor Holohan, and Eoin Brennan 0-1 each.

== Munster Minor Hurling Championship ==
=== Munster group stage ===
==== Munster group stage table ====
Advance to Munster final and All-Ireland series Advance to All-Ireland preliminary quarter-finals

Team	Matches				Score			Pts
Team	Pld	W	D	L	For	Against	Diff	Pts
Clare	4	4	0	0	88	60	28	8
Tipperary	4	3	0	1	79	73	6	6
Cork	4	2	0	2	83	75	8	4
Waterford	4	1	0	3	69	91	-22	2
Limerick	4	0	0	4	51	71	-20	0

==== Munster group stage results ====
4 April 2024 Round 1	Tipperary	1-19 - 2-12	Cork	FBD Semple Stadium
	E Doughan 0-6 (0-4f), S Tobin 0-5, C Minogue 1-2, A Cagney 0-3, E Murray 0-2, K Cantwell 0-1.	Report	M O'Brien 1-5 (0-3f), L Murphy 1-1, A Lee, J O'Brien 0-2 each, J Murphy, D Cosgrave 0-1 each.	Referee: S Walsh (Waterford)

4 April 2024 Round 1	Clare	0-22 - 0-13	Waterford	Cusack Park
	M O’Brien (0-8, 7f); H Doherty (0-3); L Murphy, G Ball, D Kennedy (0-2 each); M Corbett (f), P Finneran, D McNamara, J O’Connor, R Mulcahy (f) (0-1 each).	Report	M Hartley (0-6, 4f); J Power (0-3); G O’Shea, (0-2); C Spain, J Shanahan (0-1 each).	Referee: C O'Donovan (Tipperary)

11 April 2024 Round 2	Cork	1-16 - 1-10	Limerick	SuperValu Páirc Uí Chaoimh
	M O’Brien 0-7 (0-5f, 0-1 65), A Lee 1-1, L Hennessy 0-2, K Beechinor, J Murphy, CD O’Connor, MT Brosnan, P Barrett, L Murphy 0-1 each.	Report	J Cosgrave 1-4 (1-0 penalty, 0-4f), D Hurley, P Kearney (0-1f) 0-2 each, D Sheehan, M McKenna 0-1 each.

11 April 2024 Round 2	Waterford	2-14 - 3-16	Tipperary	Walsh Park
	M Hartley 0-7 (7fs), S Power 1-2, G O'Shea 1-1, C Spain 0-2, C Reville, J Power 0-1 each.	Report	A Ryan, B O'Brien 1-1 each, E Doughan 0-5 (4fs), S Tobin 0-4, C Minogue 1-0, J Donelan Houlihan 0-2, E Murray, D O'Hora, J Cahill 0-1 each.

18 April 2025 Round 3	Clare	0-15 - 0-09	Limerick	Cusack Park
	M Corbett (0-8, 6f); P Rodgers, H Doherty (0-2 each); L Murphy, C Ralph, P Finneran (0-1 each)	Report	D Hurley (0-6f); J Cosgrave (0-3f)

25 April 2024 Round 3	Waterford	0-12 - 3-18	Cork	Walsh Park
	M Hartley (0-4, 3fs), C Reville (0-3), S Power (0-2), T Kennedy, G O'Shea, B Cummins (0-1 each).	Report	M O'Brien (1-9, 7fs), A Lee, J Hegarty (1-1 each), L Murphy (0-3), CD O'Connor, J Murphy, J Twohig, M Brosnan (0-1 each).

2 May 2024 Round 4	Limerick	1-14 - 4-12	Waterford	TUS Gaelic Grounds
	P Kearney 0-7 (0-6 frees); J Cosgrave 0-4 (0-3 frees); M McKenna 1-0; P Cagney, G Dorgan, J O’Keeffe 0-1 each.	Report	S Power 2-3 (0-1 free); M Hartley 0-5 (0-3 frees); J Power 1-2; C Power 1-0; C Spain, T Kennedy 0-1 each.

2 May 2024 Round 4	Tipperary	0-19 - 4-11	Clare	FBD Semple Stadium
	E Doughan (0-9, 7f), E Murray (0-3), C Minogue, T Ryan (0-2 each), K Cantwell, D O’Hora (0-1 each).	Report	L Murphy (3-0), M Corbett (0-5, 4f), H Doherty (0-3, 2f) C Ralph (1-0) P Finneran (0-2), J Cullinan (0-1).

9 May 2024 Round 5	Cork	0-19 - 2-22	Clare	SuperValu Páirc Uí Chaoimh
	M O’Brien 0-11 (0-6f, 0-2 65), K Beechinor 0-2, J Hegarty, L Murphy, F Lardner, J Twohig, P Barrett, J O’Brien 0-1 each.	Report	L Murphy 2-3, H Doherty 0-6 (0-4f), P Rodgers, P Finneran 0-3 each, J O’Connor 0-2, D Moroney, J Cullinan, M Corbett (0-1f), R Hayes, D Ball 0-1 each.

9 May 2024 Round 5	Limerick	0-12 - 0-13	Tipperary	TUS Gaelic Grounds
	P Kearney (0-7, 0-6f), J Cosgrave 0-2f, E Maher, D Sheehan, M McKenna all 0-1 each	Report	E Doughan (0-6, 0-5f), C Minogue 0-3, E Murray, D O’Hora 0-2 each.

=== Munster final ===
20 May 2024 Final	Clare	0-16 - 2-17	Tipperary	TUS Gaelic Grounds
	M Corbett (2 frees), H Doherty (2 frees) (0-3 each); J Cullinan, G Ball (0-2 each); D Kennedy, R Mulcahy (65), C Ralph, P Rodgers, L Murphy, R Hayes (0-1 each).	Report	S Tobin (1-3); E Doughan (0-6, 3 frees); C Minogue (1-1); E Murray (0-3); J Donelan-Houlihan (free), D O’Hora, A Cagney, K Cantwell (0-1 each).

== All-Ireland Minor Hurling Championship ==
=== All-Ireland preliminary quarter-finals ===
25 May 2024 Preliminary quarter-final	Waterford	1-06 - 2-16	Galway	FBD Semple Stadium
	M Hartley 1-1, B Cummins 0-3 (3fs), J Power, C Spain 0-1 each.	Report	B Callanan 1-7 (7fs), C Roche 1-2, C Leen 0-2, J Donnellan (65), E Mulleady, J Ryan, R Cahalan, and H Holmes 0-1 each.

25 May 2024 Preliminary quarter-final	Cork	0-10 - 2-16	Wexford	FBD Semple Stadium
	M O’Brien 0-6 (0-4 f), J Twohig 1-0, MT Brosnan, A Lee (Cloyne), L Hennessy, O O’Connell 0-1 each.	Report	S O’Brien 1-9 (0-5 f), A O’Connell Byrne 1-2, C Carley 0-3, J Nolan, R Wickham 0-1.

=== All-Ireland quarter-finals ===
3 June 2024 Quarter-final	Clare	2-16 - 0-13	Wexford	FBD Semple Stadium
	H Doherty (0-7, 4 frees), L Murphy (1-1), P Rodgers (1-0), M Corbett (0-2, 2 frees), D Kennedy (0-2), J O’Connor (0-2, 2 frees) G Ball (0-1), R Hayes (0-1)	Report	S O’Brien (0-11, 10 frees), C Carley (0-2)

3 June 2024 Quarter-final	Dublin	2-18 - 3-18	Galway	FBD Semple Stadium
	R Flannery (0-8, 7f, 1 65), C O’Flynn (1-1), D Kilduff (1-0) F Codd (0-2), C O’Sullivan (0-2), C Barrett (0-2), T Higgins, K Costello, T Cullen (0-1 each).	Report	B Callanan (1-8, 5 frees), H Holmes (1-1), C Roche (1-1), C Leen (0-3), J Donnellan (0-2, 1f, 1 '65'), J Ryan, R O’Connor, S Moran (0-1 each).

=== All-Ireland semi-finals ===
15 June 2024 Semi-final	Tipperary	1-24 - 0-26 (aet)	Galway	TUS Gaelic Grounds
	E Doughan (0-8, 5 frees, 1 65), C Minogue (0-7), E Murray (1-4), S Tobin (0-3), J Donelan Houlihan (0-1 free), K Cantwell (0-1).	Report	B Callanan (0-15, 9 frees), C Roche (0-3), C Leen (0-2), J Donnellan (0-2, 1 free), R Cahalan (0-2), E Mulleady (0-1), J Ryan (0-1).	Referee: C Mooney (Dublin)

16 June 2024 Semi-final	Kilkenny	2-23 - 2-20 (aet)	Clare	FBD Semple Stadium
	J Mullen (0-13, 9 frees); O O’Donovan, C Holohan (1-0 each); R Doherty, B McDermott (0-3 each); K Buggy, P Lacey (0-2 each).	Report	H Doherty (0-7, 4 frees); C Ralph (1-2); M Corbett (0-5, 5 frees); P Rodgers (1-1); D Kennedy, J Cullinan, P Finneran, D McNamara, J O’Connor (0-1 each)	Referee: C Cunning (Antrim)

=== All-Ireland final ===
29 June 2024 Final	Kilkenny	3-12 - 2-17 (aet)	Tipperary	UPMC Nowlan Park
	B McDermott (1-2), R Doherty (1-0), A Clifford (1-0), C Holohan (0-3), J Mullen (0-3, 2fs), K Buggy (0-1), C Byrne (0-1), P Lacey (0-1), E Brennan (0-1)	Report	E Doughan (1-4, 1-0 65, 1f) E Murray (0-4), B O’Brien (1-1) J Donelan Houlihan (0-4, 3f), S Tobin (0-1), C Minogue (0-1), A Duff (0-1), K Cantwell (0-1)	Referee: T Gleeson (Dublin)

== Statistics ==
=== Top scorers ===
Overall

Rank	Player	Club	Tally	Total	Matches	Average
1	Seán O'Brien	Wexford	3-67	76	7	10.85
2	Jake Mullen	Kilkenny	4-55	67	8	8.37
3	Brian Callanan	Galway	4-48	60	7	8.57
4	Eoghan Doughan	Tipperary	1-44	47	7	6.71
5	Rory Flannery	Dublin	1-43	46	6	7.66
6	Mark O'Brien	Cork	2-38	44	5	8.80
7	Tom Power	Kildare	3-34	43	5	8.60
8	Odhrán Fletcher	Offaly	2-34	40	6	6.66
9	Kian Loughlin	Westmeath	0-38	38	5	7.60
10	Killian Wynne	Offaly	4-20	32	6	5.33

In a single game

Rank	Player	Club	Tally	Total	Opposition
1	Brian Callanan	Galway	0-15	15	Tipperary
2	Seán O'Brien	Wexford	1-10	13	Galway
2	Jake Mullen	Kilkenny	0-13	13	Clare
4	Jake Mullen	Kilkenny	2-06	12	Galway
4	Seán O'Brien	Wexford	1-09	12	Cork
4	Brian Callanan	Galway	1-09	12	Wexford
4	Mark O'Brien	Cork	1-09	12	Waterford
4	Odhrán Fletcher	Offaly	1-09	12	Antrim
4	Jake Mullen	Kilkenny	1-09	12	Galway
4	Kian Loughlin	Westmeath	0-12	12	Antrim
