= John Culkin (hurler) =

Irish hurler

Personal information
- Native name: Seán Mac Uilcín (Irish)
- Born: 23 August 1981 (age 45) Abbeyknockmoy, County Galway, Ireland
- Occupation: Sales rep
- Height: 6 ft 0 in (183 cm)

Sport
- Sport: Hurling
- Position: Full-back
Club
- Years: Club
- Abbeyknockmoy
Club titles
- Connacht titles: 0
College(s)
- Years: College
- University College Dublin; NUI Galway
College titles
- Fitzgibbon titles: 1
Inter-county
- Years: County
- 2000-2002: Galway
Inter-county titles
- All-Irelands: 0
- NHL: 1
- All Stars: 0

John Culkin (born 23 August 1981) is an Irish former hurler who played for Galway Championship club Abbeyknockmoy and at inter-county level with the Galway senior hurling team. He usually lined out as a full-back or centre-back.

== Career ==
Culkin played hurling as a schoolboy with St Flannan's College in Ennis. He was part of the Harty Cup-winning team in 2000 before later winning a Fitzgibbon Cup medal with University College Dublin. At club level, Culkin lined out with Abbeyknockmoy and was part of their intermediate team that lost the 2016 All-Ireland intermediate final to Bennettsbridge. He first appeared on the inter-county scene as captain of the Galway minor hurling team that won the 1999 All-Ireland minor final. Culkin later joined the under-21 team and spent a number of seasons with the senior team, during which time he won a National Hurling League title. He also won a Railway Cup medal with Connacht.

== Career statistics ==
Team	Year	National League			All-Ireland		Total	
Team	Year	Division	Apps	Score	Apps	Score	Apps	Score
Galway	2000	Division 1A	2	0-03	0	0-00	2	0-03
Galway	2001	Division 1A	1	0-01	0	0-00	1	0-01
Galway	2002	Division 1A	3	0-00	0	0-00	3	0-00
Career total			6	0-04	0	0-00	6	0-04

== Honours ==
St Flannan's College

- Harty Cup: 2000

University College Dublin

- Fitzgibbon Cup: 2001

Abbeyknockmoy

- Connacht Intermediate Club Hurling Championship: 2015
- Galway Intermediate Hurling Championship: 2015

Galway

- National Hurling League: 2000
- All-Ireland Minor Hurling Championship: 1999

Connacht

- Railway Cup: 1999

Sporting positions
Preceded by Keith Hayes	Galway minor hurling team captain 1999	Succeeded by Richie Murray
Achievements
Preceded by Cathal McCarthy	All-Ireland Minor Hurling Final winning captain 1999	Succeeded by Richie Murray
