= 2005 All-Ireland Minor Hurling Championship =

All-Ireland Minor Hurling Championship 2004
Championship Details
- Dates: 31 March 2005 – 11 September 2005
- Teams: 16

All Ireland Champions
- Winners: Galway (7th win)
- Captain: Andrew Keary
- Manager: Mattie Murphy

All Ireland Runners-up
- Runners-up: Limerick
- Captain: Gavin O'Mahony
- Manager: Timmy O'Connor

Provincial Champions
- Munster: Cork
- Leinster: Dublin
- Ulster: Antrim
- Connacht: Not Played

Championship Statistics
- Top Scorer: Eoin Ryan (4-40)

The 2005 All-Ireland Minor Hurling Championship was the 75th staging of the All-Ireland Minor Hurling Championship since its establishment by the Gaelic Athletic Association in 1928. The championship began on 31 March 2005 and ended on 11 September 2005.

Galway entered the championship as the defending champions.

On 11 September 2005, Galway won the championship following a 3-12 to 0-17 defeat of Limerick in the All-Ireland final. This was their second All-Ireland title in succession.

Limerick's Eoin Ryan was the championship's top scorer with 4-40.

== Results ==
=== Leinster Minor Hurling Championship ===
Group stage

2 April 2005 Round 1	Offaly	1-14 - 0-10	Laois	St. Brendan's Park, Birr
	B Nolan 1-3, C Coughlan 0-5, D Horan 0-2, D Molloy 0-1, C Flannery 0-1, J Bergin 0-1.		N Delaney 0-3, E Fitzpatrick 0-3, K Finlay 0-1, J O'Loughlin 0-1, W Hyland 0-1, M Whelan 0-1.	Referee: J Quinlan (Carlow)

2 April 2005 Round 1	Dublin	0-13 - 1-10	Wexford	Parnell Park, Dublin
	K O'Reilly 0-7, R O'Carroll 0-2, S Durkin 0-2, T Brady 0-1, K Dunne 0-1.		J Codd 0-5, T Waters 1-0, PJ Nolan 0-2, P Mythen 0-2, P Hughes 0-1.

16 April 2005 Round 2	Offaly	4-14 - 1-12	Dublin	St. Brendan's Park, Birr
	B Nolan 2-2, C Coughlan 1-3, C Flannery 1-1, J Bergin 0-4, D Molloy 0-2, D Horan 0-1, M Bevans 0-1.		K O'Reilly 0-7, D O'Dwyer 1-1, S Durkin 0-1, K Dunne 0-1, R O'Carroll 0-1, S O'Rourke 0-1.	Referee: F Devereux (Kildare)

16 April 2005 Round 2	Wexford	4-06 - 3-07	Laois	Páirc Uí Shíocháin, Gorey
	K Burke 1-2, PJ Nolan 1-2, D Redmond 1-1, J Flynn 1-0, P Mythen 0-1.		M Whelan 1-2, W Hyland 1-0, Z Keenan 1-0, J O'Loughlin 0-2, E Dwyer 0-1, N Delaney 0-1, K Finlay 0-1.	Referee: D Connolly (Kilkenny)

23 April 2005 Round 3	Wexford	1-15 - 2-10	Offaly	Piercestown
	PJ Nolan 1-4, K Burke 0-6, D Redmond 0-3, B Travers 0-1, T Waters 0-1.		B Nolan 1-3, C Coughlan 1-3, D Horan 0-2, C Flannery 0-1, J Whelehan 0-1.

30 April 2005 Round 3	Laois	0-10 - 1-16	Dublin	O'Moore Park, Portlaoise
	J O'Loughlin 0-6, M Whelan 0-2, W Hyland 0-2.		K O'Reilly 1-4, S O'Rourke 0-3, J Maher 0-2, J McCaffrey 0-2, E Walsh 0-1, K Dunne 0-1, S Casey 0-1, S Durkin 0-1, R O'Carroll 0-1.

Quarter-finals

7 May 2005 Quarter-final	Offaly	1-05 - 0-14	Dublin	St. Brendan's Park, Birr
	C Coughlan 1-4, G Kelly 0-1.		K O'Reilly 0-5, J Boland 0-2, C Twomey 0-2, J McCaffrey 0-2, S Durkin 0-1, J Maher 0-1.

11 May 2005 Quarter-final	Carlow	0-08 - 0-09	Laois	Dr. Cullen Park, Carlow
	A Cox 0-2, P Nolan 0-2, D Hickey 0-1, D Kavanagh 0-1, R Cody 0-1, J Kavanagh 0-1.		Z Keenan 0-6, N Delaney 0-1, W Hyland 0-1, J O'Loughlin 0-1.	Referee: R Holohan (Kildare)

Semi-finals

25 June 2005 Semi-final	Wexford	1-16 - 3-7	Laois	Dr. Cullen Park, Carlow
	TJ Nolan 1-3; K Burke 0-5, T Waters 0-4, D Redman 0-2, F O'Gorman 0-1, J Codd 0-1.	Report	W Highland 2-0, M Bermingham 1-0 pen, C Delaney 0-4, C Donne, N Delaney, D O'Flaherty 0-1 each.	Referee: J Quinlan (Carlow)

25 June 2005 Semi-final	Dublin	2-16 - 4-7	Kilkenny	Dr. Cullen Park, Carlow
	R O'Carroll 1-2, S Dorkin 0-4, J Maher, J McCaffrey (1f) 0-3 each, 0-1 '65, D O'Dwyer 1-0, K O'Reilly 0-2 (1f, 1 line cut), C Twomey and S Casey 0-1 each.	Report	R Hogan 2-3 (2f), TJ Reid 1-1, E Cody 1-0, M Bergin 0-2, P Doheny 0-1.	Referee: S Whelan (Wexford)

Final

3 July 2005 Final	Dublin	0-17 - 0-12	Wexford	Croke Park, Dublin
	J McCaffrey 0-4, K O’Reilly 0-4, J Boland 0-3, S Casey 0-2, R O’Carroll 0-1, K Dunne 0-1, D O’Dwyer 0-1, S Durkin 0-1.		K Burke 0-6, PJ Nolan 0-2, M Molloy 0-1, T Waters 0-1, F O’Gorman 0-1, J Codd 0-1.	Referee: D Connolly (Kilkenny)

=== Munster Minor Hurling Championship ===
Quarter-finals

31 March 2005 Quarter-final	Limerick	1-11 - 2-08	Waterford	Semple Stadium, Thurles
	E Ryan 0-6, D O'Sullivan 1-1, S Herlihy 0-2, J Kelly 0-1, D Hanley 0-1.		C Moloney 1-2, T Connors 1-1, R Foley 0-2, K Moran 0-2, S Walsh 0-1.	Referee: J Ryan (Tipperary)

1 April 2005 Quarter-final	Kerry	0-01 - 4-28	Cork	Austin Stack Park, Tralee
	K Dineen 0-1.		P Cronin 0-7, P O'Sullivan 2-0, E Murphy 1-2, P Horgan 0-5, S Moylan 1-1, P Finnegan 0-4, P O'Brien 0-3, J Halbert 0-2, C Naughton 0-2, P O'Driscoll 0-1, S White 0-1.	Referee: V O'Toole (Waterford)

2 April 2005 Quarter-final	Tipperary	2-20 - 1-11	Clare	Gaelic Grounds, Limerick
	J McLoughney 1-6, N Bergin 1-3, R mcLoughney 0-3, J Ryan 0-2, P Ivors 0-2, P Bourke 0-2, K Reade 0-1, D O'Hanlon 0-1.		B Gaffney 1-1, C Ryan 0-4, R Horan 0-2, D Browne 0-2, G Arthur 0-1, C Madden 0-1.	Referee: C McAllister (Cork)

8 April 2005 Quarter-final replay	Limerick	2-09 - 2-08	Waterford	Semple Stadium, Thurles
	E Ryan 2-7, J Ryan 0-1, J Kelly 0-1.		C Moloney 0-7, P Kearney 1-0, J Kearney 1-0, K Moran 0-1.	Referee: B White (Tipperary)

Playoffs

13 April 2005 Playoff	Waterford	2-13 - 0-11	Clare	Semple Stadium, Thurles
	C Moloney 1-5, K Moran 1-2, J Dooley 0-3, T Connors 0-1, P Kearney 0-1, P Murray 0-1.		D Browne 0-3, C Ryan 0-2, M O'Donnell 0-2, N Killeen 0-1, R Horan 0-1, D Reidy 0-1, D Morey 0-1.	Referee: K Healy (Cork)

- Kerry withdrew from the championship in this round.

Semi-finals

4 May 2005 Semi-final	Cork	1-15 - 2-7	Waterford	Páirc Uí Rinn, Cork
	P Horgan 1-4, C Naughton, P O'Brien, E Murphy, P Cronin, J Halbert 0-2 each, P Finnegan 0-1.	Report	T Connors 1-1, C Maloney 1-2, J Dooley, J Gorman, F Galvin, A Power 0-1 each.	Referee: D O'Driscoll (Limerick)

4 May 2005 Semi-final	Limerick	2-14 - 1-6	Tipperary	FitzGerald Park, Kilmallock
	B O'Sullivan 0-4, D O'Sullivan 1-1, G O'Mahony 1-1, E Ryan 0-3, D O'Connor 0-2, J Kelly, J Ryan, D Hanley 0-1.	Report	J McLoughney 1-4, D Maher, N Bergin 0-1.	Referee: G Hoey (Clare)

Final

26 June 2005 Final	Cork	2-18 - 1-12	Limerick	Páirc Uí Chaoimh, Cork
	P Cronin 1-10 (0-5f), P Horgan 1-2, C Naughton, E Murphy 0-2 each, J Halbert, P O'Brien 0-1 each.	Report	E Ryan 1-8 (1-4f), D O'Sullivan, J Kelly, M Ryan, D Moore 0-1 each.	Referee: J Ryan (Tipperary)

=== Ulster Minor Hurling Championship ===
Semi-final

22 May 2005 Semi-final	Derry	4-11 - 0-05	Down	Casement Park, Belfast

Final

5 June 2005 Final	Antrim	3-18 - 2-07	Derry	Casement Park, Belfast
	P Shields 2-1; P McGill 0-5f; B McFall 1-1; S McNaughton 0-3; S Casey 0-2; N McAuley ('65), R McDonnell, O McFadden, C Duffin, E McCloskey, P Doherty 0-1 each.	Report	K O'Neill, A O'Hara 1-0 each; M Kirkpatrick (1f), S Dodds (1f) 0-2 each; B Dodds, R Kealey, G Kelly 0-1 each.	Referee: J O'Rourke (Monaghan)

=== All-Ireland Minor Hurling Championship ===
Quarter-finals

23 July 2005 Quarter-final	Limerick	4-12 - 2-17	Antrim	Parnell Park, Dublin
	E Ryan 1-4 (2f), M Ryan 1-2, D O'Sullivan 1-1, G Collins 1-0, J Kelly 0-2 (2f), D Hanley 0-1, G O'Mahony 0-1, P Moloney 0-1.		P Mc Gill 0-6 (4f, one 65), S McNaughton, P Doherty 1-2 each, E McCloskey, R McDonnell 0-2 each, S McCorry, C Maskey, C Duffin 0-1 each.	Referee: D Connolly (Kilkenny)

23 July 2005 Quarter-final	Galway	3-13 - 1-11	Wexford	O'Moore Park, Portlaoise
	J Canning 1-3, C Kavanagh 2-0, K Coen, S Glynn, B Murphy, A Callanan 0-2 each, A Keary, A Harte 0-1.		K Burke 1-6, J Codd, PJ Nolan 0-2 each, G Sinnott 0-1.	Referee: J Ryan (Tipperary)

Semi-finals

13 August 2005 Semi-final	Galway	4-13 - 1-09	Cork	O'Moore Park, Portlaoise
	J Canning 1-6, C Kavanagh 2-2, B Murphy 1-0, S Glynn 0-2, J Hughes, F Kerrigan, J Greene 0-1 each.	Report	C Naughton 1-2, P Cronin, P O'Brien 0-2 each, P Horgan, P O'Sullivan, S Moylan 0-1 each.

20 August 2005 Semi-final	Limerick	3-12 - 0-17	Dublin	Nowlan Park, Kilkenny
	E Ryan (0-6, 5 frees); J Kelly (0-5, 4 frees, 1 65); M Ryan (0-2); B O'Sullivan, D Hanley (0-1 each).	Report	J Caffrey (0-3, 1 free); K O'Reilly (0-3, frees); S O'Rourke (0-3); T Brady, C Twomey, R O'Carroll (0-1 each).	Referee: T McIntyre (Antrim)

Final

11 September 2005 Final	Galway	3-12 - 0-17	Limerick	Croke Park, Dublin
	J Canning 1-3 (0-1f), C Kananagh 1-1, T Flannery 1-0, S Glynn, F Kerrigan 0-2 each, J Greene, K Kilkenny, K Coen, J Hughes (f) 0-1 each.	Report	E Ryan 0-6 (2f), B O'Sullivan, J Kelly (3f) 0-3 each, S Hickey 0-2, G O'Mahoney, M Ryan, D Hanley 0-1 each.	Referee: É Morris (Dublin)

== Statistics ==
=== Top scorers ===
Top scorer overall

Rank	Player	Club	Tally	Total	Matches	Average
1	Eoin Ryan	Limerick	4-40	52	7	7.42
2	Kevin O'Reilly	Dublin	1-32	35	7	5.00
3	Keith Burke	Wexford	2-25	31	5	6.20
4	Craig Moloney	Waterford	3-16	25	4	6.25
5	Colm Coughlan	Offaly	3-15	24	4	6.00
5	Pa Cronin	Cork	1-21	24	4	6.00
7	Joe Canning	Galway	3-12	21	3	7.00
8	Brian Nolan	Offaly	4-08	20	4	5.00
9	Conor Kavanagh	Galway	5-03	18	3	6.00
9	Patrick Horgan	Cork	2-12	18	4	4.50

Top scorers in a single game

Rank	Player	Club	Tally	Total	Opposition
1	Eoin Ryan	Limerick	2-07	13	Waterford
1	Pa Cronin	Cork	1-10	13	Limerick
3	Eoin Ryan	Limerick	1-08	11	Cork
4	Richie Hogan	Kilkenny	2-03	9	Dublin
4	Joey McLoughney	Tipperary	1-06	9	Clare
4	Joe Canning	Galway	1-06	9	Cork
4	Keith Burke	Wexford	1-06	9	Galway
8	Brian Nolan	Offaly	2-02	8	Dublin
8	Conor Kavanagh	Galway	2-02	8	Cork
8	Craig Moloney	Waterford	1-05	8	Clare

=== Miscellaneous ===
- Dublin won the Leinster Championship for the first time since 1983.
- Limerick qualified for the All-Ireland final for the first time since 1984.
