= 2004 All-Ireland Minor Hurling Championship =

All-Ireland Minor Hurling Championship 2004
Championship Details
- Dates: 27 March 2004 - 19 September 2004
- Teams: 16

All Ireland Champions
- Winners: Galway (6th win)
- Captain: John Lee
- Manager: Mattie Murphy

All Ireland Runners-up
- Runners-up: Kilkenny
- Captain: Ronan Maher
- Manager: Damien Brennan

Provincial Champions
- Munster: Cork
- Leinster: Kilkenny
- Ulster: Antrim
- Connacht: Not Played

Championship Statistics
- Top Scorer: Darragh Hickey (4-29)

The 2004 All-Ireland Minor Hurling Championship was the 74th staging of the All-Ireland Minor Hurling Championship since its establishment by the Gaelic Athletic Association in 1928. The championship began on 27 March 2004 and ended on 19 September 2004.

Kilkenny entered the championship as defending champions.

On 19 September 2004, Galway won the championship following a 0-16 to 1-12 defeat of Kilkenny in the All-Ireland final replay at O'Connor Park. This was their sixth All-Ireland title overall and their first title since 2000.

Tipperary's Darragh Hickey was the championship's top scorer with 4-29.

== Results ==
=== Leinster Minor Hurling Championship ===
Group stage

| 10 April 2004 Round 1 | Laois | 1-10 - 0-14 | Offaly | O'Moore Park, Portlaoise |
| | C Delaney 1-3, W Hyland 0-3, C Dunne 0-2, D Bergin 0-1, M Whelan 0-1. | | C Slevin 0-5, E Lee 0-3, C Parlon 0-2, A Egan 0-2, J Bergin 0-1, S Dooley 0-1.; |

| 10 April 2004 Round 1 | Dublin | 1-12 - 1-07 | Wexford | Enniscorthy |
| | S Loughlin 0-8, A McCrabbe 1-2, M Smyth 0-1, P Carton 0-1. | | M Mythen 1-0, L Kinsella 0-3, P Byrne 0-3, E Quigley 0-1. |

| 24 April 2004 Round 2 | Dublin | 2-12 - 0-11 | Offaly | Parnell Park, Dublin |
| | A McCrabbe 2-1, S Loughlin 0-3, S Costelloe 0-2, J Duffy 0-2, T Diamond 0-1, P Carton 0-1, W Lowry 0-1, F Rabbitte 0-1. | | E Lee 0-3, J Bergin 0-3, C Parlon 0-2, R Ryland 0-1, C Slevin 0-1, D Kenny 0-1. |

| 24 April 2004 Round 2 | Laois | 0-09 - 2-09 | Wexford | O'Moore Park, Portlaoise |
| | C Delaney 0-3, D Bergin 0-2, D Delaney 0-1, D Guilfoyle 0-1, B Fingleton 0-1, Z Keenan 0-1. | | N Kirwan 1-5, P Cullen 1-0, PJ Nolan 0-1, D O'Sullivan 0-1, C O'Connor 0-1, M Mythen 0-1. | Referee: J McGrath (Westmeath) |

| 8 May 2004 Round 3 | Offaly | 1-11 - 0-11 | Wexford | St. Brendan's Park, Birr |
| | J Bergin 0-7, A Egan 1-0, E Lee 0-2, C Slevin 0-1, J Keane 0-1. | | N Kiran 0-5, K Burke 0-2, A O'Neill 0-2, G Sinnott 0-1, D Gough 0-1. | Referee: A Stapleton (Laois) |

| 8 May 2004 Round 3 | Dublin | 0-13 - 1-08 | Laois | Parnell Park, Dublin |
| | S Loughlin 0-4, P Carton 0-2, A McCarbbe 0-2, J Duffy 0-2, L Fleming 0-1, M Smyth 0-1, S Costello 0-1. | | Z Keenan 1-2, D Bergin 0-2, C Delaney 0-3, B Fingleton 0-1. |

Quarter-finals

| 22 May 2004 Quarter-final | Offaly | 5-16 - 0-04 | Laois | St. Brendan's Park, Birr |
| | C Parlon 2-2, J Bergin 1-4, P Cleary 1-1, E Lee 1-0, A Egan 0-3, J Keane 0-3, S Dooley 0-2, G Treacy 0-1. | | Z Keenan 0-2, J Delaney 0-1, D Delaney 0-1. | Referee: J McGrath (Westmeath) |

| 22 May 2004 Quarter-final | Meath | 2-06 - 3-15 | Wexford | Páirc Tailteann, Navan |
| | C Curtis 1-4, D Wallace 1-1, C Burke 0-1. | | D Gough 0-7, PJ Nolan 1-2, T Waters 1-1, R Kehoe 1-0, N Kirwan 0-2, K Burke 0-1, M Mythen 0-1, A Griffith 0-1. |

Semi-finals

| 26 June 2004 Semi-final | Kilkenny | 4-12 - 0-07 | Offaly | Dr. Cullen Park, Carlow |
| | R Hogan 1-2, M Nolan 1-2, E Guinan 1-1, P Hogan 0-3, E O'Donoghue 0-2, S Prendergast 0-1, G Nolan 0-1. | | J Bergin 0-3, J Keane 0-1, G Kelly 0-1, C Parlon 0-1, E Lee 0-1. |

| 26 June 2004 Semi-final | Dublin | 4-07 - 2-12 | Wexford | Dr. Cullen Park, Carlow |
| | P Caron 2-1, S Loughlin 0-5, E Moran 1-1, J Boland 1-0. | | D Gough 1-2, PJ Nolan 0-4, K Burke 1-0, N Kirwan 0-3, M Mythen 0-1, L Kinsella 0-1, A O'Neill 0-1. |

Final

| 4 July 2004 Final | Kilkenny | 1-15 - 1-04 | Dublin | Croke Park, Dublin |
| | E Guinan 0-6, P Hogan 1-1, M Nolan 0-4, M Aylward 0-2, G Nolan 0-2. | | M Smyth 1-0, A McCrabbe 0-2, E Moran 0-1, S Loughlin 0-1. |

=== Munster Minor Hurling Championship ===
First round

| 27 March 2004 First round | Tipperary | 2-24 - 0-09 | Clare | Gaelic Grounds, Limerick |
| | D Hickey 1-12, S Long 1-0, J McCarthy 0-3, D Egan 0-3, S Scully 0-2, P Ivors 0-2, J Woodlock 0-1, J McLoughlin 0-1. | | B Gaffney 0-5, S O'Brien 0-2, P O'Hare 0-1, K Kennedy 0-1. |

| 7 April 2004 First round | Waterford | 1-09 - 0-16 | Cork | Walsh Park, Waterford |
| | M Gorman 0-5, J Nagle 1-0, J Quirke 0-2, K Moran 0-1, C Moloney 0-1. | | P Cronin 0-8, B Ring 0-5, K Canty 0-1, G O'Leary 0-1, C Keane 0-1. |

| 7 April 2004 First round | Kerry | 0-02 - 4-24 | Limerick | John Joe O'Sullivan Park, Ballyheigue |
| | D Dineen 0-2. | | B O'Sullivan 2-4, C Mullane 1-4, M Noonan 0-5, G O'Mahony 1-0, A Brennan 0-3, J Ryan 0-3, David Moloney 0-3, J Kelly 0-2. |

Playoffs

| 21 April 2004 Playoff | Kerry | 0-06 - 5-20 | Clare | Austin Stack Park, Tralee |
| | D Dineen 0-5, R Galvin 0-1. | | B Gaffney 2-9, D O'Donoghue 2-3, D. Barrett 1-0, K Kennedy 0-2, D O'Halloran 0-2, S O'Brien 0-2, P Lynch 0-1, M O'Donnell 0-1. |

| 28 April 2004 Playoff | Clare | 2-09 - 1-10 | Waterford | Semple Stadium, Thurles |
| | B Gaffney (1-4), D O'Donoghue (1-0), D Barrett (0-2), D Browne (0-2); S O'Brien (0-1). | | M Gorman (1-5), J Quirke (0-3), M Fives (0-1); T Power (0-1). |

Semi-finals

| 12 May 2004 Semi-final | Tipperary | 1-16 - 0-08 | Clare | Gaelic Grounds, Limerick |
| | D Hickey 1-7, S Long 0-3, D Egan 0-2, R McLoughney 0-1, S O'Brien 0-1, S Scully 0-1, J Dixon 0-1. | | D Barrett 0-2, B Gaffney 0-2, S O'Brien 0-2, D O'Halloran 0-1, J Clancy 0-1. |

| 13 May 2004 Semi-final | Cork | 2-09 - 0-13 | Limerick | Semple Stadium, Thurles |
| | B Ring 2-0, P Cronin 0-6, C Keane 0-1, G O'Leary 0-1, F O'Leary 0-1. | | M Noonan 0-4, P Cregan 0-3, B Hayes 0-3, David Moloney 0-1, J Ryan 0-1, L O'Dwyer 0-1. |

Final

| 27 June 2004 Final | Cork | 2-13 - 3-08 | Tipperary | Semple Stadium, Thurles |
| | P Cronin 0-7 (0-4 frees), E Murphy 1-1, C Keane 1-0, R Conway 0-2, B Ring, P O'Brien, S O'Neill (free) 0-1 each. | Report | S Long 2-2, D Hickey 1-1 (0-1 free), D Ryan, P Ivors 0-2 each. | Referee: E Hoey (Clare) |

=== Ulster Minor Hurling Championship ===
Semi-final

| 23 May 2004 Semi-final | Antrim | 3-18 - 1-07 | Derry | Casement Park, Belfast |
| | P Magill 1-7, S McGarry 2-2, M Butler 0-3, S McCrory 0-3, C Boyle 0-2, J Peoples 0-1. | | M Lynch 0-4, R Kealey 1-0, P McGlade 0-2, D McEldowney 0-1. | Referee: D Magee (Down) |

Final

| 6 June 2004 Final | Antrim | 5-15 - 3-07 | Down | Casement Park, Belfast |
| | P Magill 0-7 (6f), S McGarry 2-1, S McCrory 1-2, J Peoples 1-1, C McFall 1-0 (1-0 sideline cut), M Butler, C Boyel, S McNaughton, L Knocker 0-1 each. | Report | B Ennis 2-0, E McGuinness 1-1, C McManus 0-2 (2f), S Ennis, S Adair, S Keith (1f), C Woods 0-1 each. | Referee: M Mulholland (Derry) |

=== All-Ireland Minor Hurling Championship ===
Quarter-finals

| 24 July 2004 Quarter-final | Tipperary | 3-14 - 1-11 | Dublin | Dr. Cullen Park, Carlow |
| | D Hickey 1-6 (0-5f), D Egan 1-1, C Larkin 0-2, J McLoughney 0-2 (1 65), J Woodlock, J Dixon, K Bergin, S Long 0-1 each. | Report | K O'Reilly 0-9 (0-7f), W Lowry (1-0), E Moran, S Costello 0-1 each. | Referee: P Green (Galway) |

| 24 July 2004 Quarter-final | Galway | 4-24 - 2-07 | Antrim | Parnell Park, Dublin |
| | K Wade 1-10 (6f), B Hanley 1-6, K Coen 1-2, A Murphy 1-0, K Walsh, M Ryan 0-2 each, A Carey, K Kilkenny 0-1 each. | Report | P MaGill 0-7 (6f), J Peoples, S McGarry 1-0 each. |

Semi-finals

| 8 August 2004 Semi-final | Kilkenny | 1-08 - 0-10 | Tipperary | Croke Park, Dublin |
| | R Hogan 0-4, G Nolan 1-0, E Guinan 0-2, P Hogan, M Nolan (f) 0-1 each. | Report | K Bergin, D Hickey (3f) 0-3 each, N Bergin 0-2, D Egan, S Long 0-1 each. | Referee: D Richardson (Limerick) |

| 15 August 2004 Semi-final | Galway | 2-15 - 1-13 | Cork | Croke Park, Dublin |
| | K Wade 1-9 (0-6 frees); J Canning 1-1; B Hanley, V Coone 0-2 each; E Collins 0-1. Cork: | Report | P Cronin 0-7 (0-5 frees); C Naughton 1-2; E Murphy, G O’Leary, K Canty, S O’Neill (free) 0-1 each. | Referee: B Gavin (Offaly) |

Finals

| 12 September 2004 Final | Kilkenny | 1-18 - 3-12 | Galway | Croke Park, Dublin |
| | G Nolan 0-5 (0-1 free); M Nolan 0-4 (frees); E Guinan, N Kenny 0-3 each; M Ruth 1-0; P Hogan 0-2; R Hogan 0-1. | Report | B Hanley 2-3; K Wade 1-5 (0-3 frees); J Canning, A Carey, K Hynes, J Hughes 0-1 each. | Referee: J Sexton (Limerick) |

| 19 September 2004 Final replay | Galway | 0-16 - 1-12 | Kilkenny | O'Connor Park, Tullamore |
| | K Wade 0-7 (6f), J Canning 0-4 (2 lineballs, 1f), K Hynes 0-2, F Coone 0-2 each, K Kilkenny 0-1. | Report | E Guinan 1-1, M Nolan 0-4 (3f), P Hogan 0-3 (2f) '65', N Prendergast, E O'Donoghue, R Hogan and M Ruth 0-1 each | Referee: B Gavin (Offaly) |

== Championship statistics ==
=== Top scorers ===
Top scorers overall

| Rank | Player | Club | Tally | Total | Matches | Average |
|---|---|---|---|---|---|---|
| 1 | Darragh Hickey | Tipperary | 4-29 | 41 | 5 | 8.20 |
| 2 | Kerril Wade | Galway | 3-31 | 40 | 4 | 10.00 |
| 3 | Bernard Gaffney | Clare | 3-20 | 29 | 4 | 7.25 |
| 4 | Pa Cronin | Cork | 0-28 | 28 | 4 | 7.00 |
| 5 | Patrick Magill | Antirm | 1-21 | 24 | 3 | 8.00 |
| 6 | Joe Bergin | Offaly | 1-18 | 21 | 5 | 4.20 |
| 6 | Stephen Loughlin | Dublin | 0-21 | 21 | 5 | 4.20 |
| 8 | Barry Hanley | Galway | 3-11 | 20 | 4 | 5.00 |
| 9 | Eoin Guinan | Kilkenny | 2-13 | 19 | 5 | 3.80 |

Top scorers in a single game

| Rank | Player | Club | Tally | Total | Opposition |
|---|---|---|---|---|---|
| 1 | Bernard Gaffney | Clare | 2-09 | 15 | Kerry |
| 1 | Darragh Hickey | Tipperary | 1-12 | 15 | Clare |
| 3 | Kerril Wade | Galway | 1-10 | 13 | Antrim |
| 4 | Kerril Wade | Galway | 1-09 | 12 | Cork |
| 5 | Brian O'Sullivan | Limerick | 2-04 | 10 | Kerry |
| 5 | Darragh Hickey | Tipperary | 1-07 | 10 | Clare |
| 5 | Patrick Magill | Antrim | 1-07 | 10 | Derry |
| 8 | David O'Donoghue | Clare | 2-03 | 9 | Kerry |
| 8 | Barry Hanley | Galway | 2-03 | 9 | Kilkenny |
| 8 | Darragh Hickey | Tipperary | 1-06 | 9 | Dublin |
| 8 | Barry Hanley | Galway | 1-06 | 9 | Antrim |
| 8 | Kevin O'Reilly | Dublin | 0-09 | 9 | Tipperary |
