= 2018 in Ireland =

- Centuries: 19th; 20th; 21st
- Decades: 1990s; 2000s; 2010s; 2020s
- See also: 2018 in Northern Ireland; Other events of 2018; List of years in Ireland

Events during the year 2018 in Ireland.

== Incumbents ==
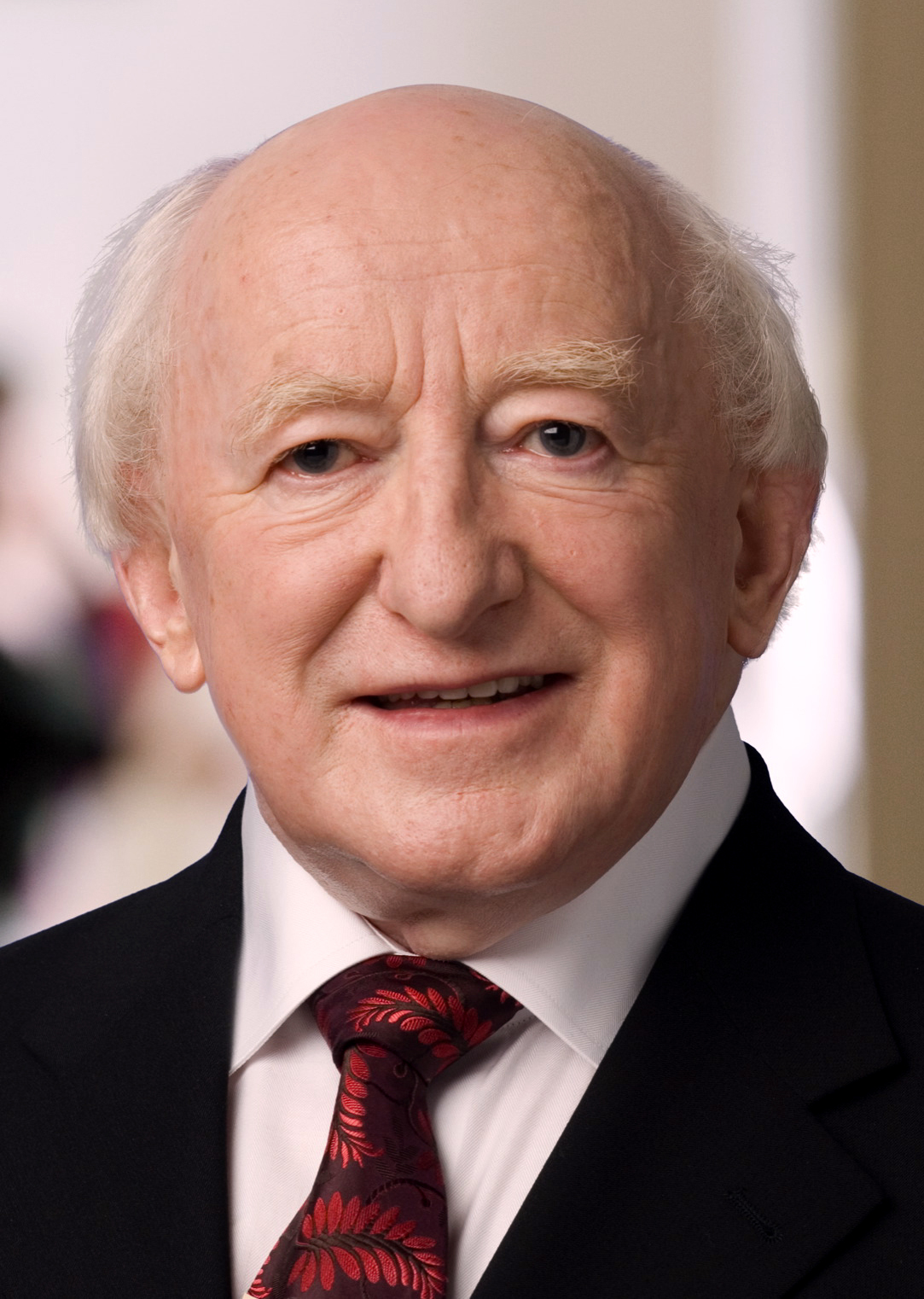
President Michael D. Higgins

- President: Michael D. Higgins
- Taoiseach: Leo Varadkar (FG)
- Tánaiste: Simon Coveney (FG)
- Minister for Finance: Paschal Donohoe (FG)
- Chief Justice: Frank Clarke
- Dáil: 32nd
- Seanad: 25th

== Events ==
=== January ===
- 1 January
  - Teachtaí Dála awarded themselves a pay increase of €3,600, with a further increase to follow in October, bringing the total increase in 2018 to €4,500, yielding an annual salary of €94,500.
  - The Road Safety Authority published provisional statistics for 2017, which showed a 15% drop in road deaths since year. A total of 158 people died on Ireland's roads compared to 186 lives lost in 2016. It was the lowest figure since they were first officially recorded in 1959.
  - A 2016 Regulation changed the boundaries and classifications of NUTS regions across Europe (administrative divisions of countries for statistical purposes), with the new classification in Ireland applying from 1 January 2018
- 2 January
  - A record 656 patients were on trolleys or on wards waiting for admission to a bed, according to the Irish Nurses and Midwives Organisation.
  - Met Éireann issued two Status Orange warnings as Storm Eleanor swept across the country bringing gusts of up to 130 km/h and flooding in some areas. Up to 55,000 Electricity Supply Board customers in the west and north west of the country were left without power.
- 3 January – The level of hospital overcrowding increased to a national record of 677 patients, according to the latest figures from the Irish Nurses and Midwives Organisation.
- 4 January – Taoiseach Leo Varadkar apologised to patients who have experienced long delays and waits on trolleys in emergency departments as the Health Service Executive revealed that there were 12 children on trolleys in the three children's hospitals in Dublin.
- 6 January – The Roman Catholic Diocese of Down and Connor suspended the sign of peace between people at masses in response to the surge in cases of influenza.
- 7 January – Met Éireann issued a Status Orange low temperature warning for many counties, with temperatures as low as −6 °C expected overnight.
- 12 January – Minister for Foreign Affairs and Trade Simon Coveney met new Northern Ireland Secretary Karen Bradley for the first time. The two ministers discussed the re-establishment of power-sharing in the north.
- 14 January – The Citizens' Assembly recommended a ban on anonymous donations to political parties and campaign groups, while favouring the introduction of weekend voting and lowering the voting age to 16.
- 15 January – Gardaí (police) announced that they are to conduct a review into the death of a baby whose body was found on a beach at Cahersiveen in County Kerry 33 years ago.
- 16 January – Gardaí apologised to Joanne Hayes for the stress and pain she was put through as part of the original investigation into the murder of 'Baby John' in Kerry in 1984.
- 17 January
  - Taoiseach Leo Varadkar said that the European Union is at a decisive point in its future when he addressed MEPs in the European Parliament in the first of a series of debates between EU government leaders and MEPs on the future of the EU.
  - Opening statements on the Report of the Joint Committee on the Eighth Amendment of the Constitution were made in the Dáil, with Minister for Health Simon Harris describing the commencement of the debate as a historic one.
- 18 January
  - Minister for Transport Shane Ross accidentally voted against his own Road Traffic Bill in the Dáil.
  - Fianna Fáil leader Micheál Martin announced his support for the repeal of the Eighth Amendment.
- 20 January – Mary Lou McDonald was confirmed as Sinn Féin's President-elect by Gerry Adams at a meeting of the party Ard Comhairle and its Northern region organisation in Belfast. She was he only candidate for the leadership.
- 25 January – The Dáil passed legislation to allow the sale of alcohol on Good Friday for the first time in over 90 years.
- 27 January – Taoiseach Leo Varadkar announced that he will be campaigning for more liberal abortion laws in the forthcoming referendum on the repeal of the Eighth Amendment.
- 29 January
  - It was announced that Michelle O'Neill is to be the new deputy leader of Sinn Féin after it was confirmed she was the only candidate nominated for the post.
  - The Cabinet gave formal approval to the holding of a referendum on the Eighth Constitutional Amendment.

=== February ===
- 3 February – Brexit supporter Nigel Farage said at a Dublin conference that there was "a gap in the political market" in Ireland for a party to push for an Irish exit from the European Union.
- 5 February – More than 30 homes in 12 counties were searched as part of an investigation into the possession and distribution of child abuse images.
- 7 February – More than 30 secondary school students and two adults were taken to hospital after a school bus and a car collided in Caherconlish, County Limerick.
- 9 February – The EU's chief Brexit negotiator Michel Barnier said the UK's decision to leave the EU single market and customs union will mean checks at the Irish border are "unavoidable".
- 10 February – Mary Lou McDonald was formally elected as President of Sinn Féin at a special Ard Fheis at the RDS.
- 12 February – Taoiseach Leo Varadkar and British Prime Minister Theresa May held talks at Stormont in an effort to resolve the deadlock in establishing the Executive.
- 14 February – A three-year-old girl died following an alleged assault at her home in Dublin the previous Saturday.
- 16 February – The government launched a €116 billion development plan for the country. Project Ireland 2040 is aiming to spread economic development across the country which will see a population expansion of one million people over the lifetime of the plan.
- 20 February – The proposed wording that would be inserted in the Constitution should people vote to repeal the Eighth Amendment has been agreed by the Cabinet.
- 25 February – Aodhán Ó Conchúir, a 14-year-old student at Pobalscoil Chorca Dhuibhne, died following a head injury sustained while playing in a football match in Dingle.
- 28 February – Met Éireann issued a red weather warning, its most severe alert, for all of Munster and Leinster as the Beast from the East weather event arrived.

=== March ===
- 1 March – The Status Red snow and ice warning was extended to the entire country with blizzard conditions expected. Taoiseach Leo Varadkar called on people to heed public safety warnings about the blizzard conditions that are expected and to be safe at home by 4pm on Thursday.
- 2 March
  - Two separate weather warnings were in place for the country tonight as blizzard-like conditions and exceptionally high accumulations of snow were expected with the arrival of Storm Emma.
  - Taoiseach Leo Varadkar ordered a general review of the Government's Strategic Communications Unit (SCU) after a week of controversy over advertorials for Project Ireland 2040.
- 3 March – A vote in Lisdoonvarna returned a 93% rejection of plans by the Reception and Integration Agency (RIA) to house asylum seekers in the King Thomond Hotel.
- 4 March – A 27-year-old man appeared in court in Dundalk charged with the murder of Detective Garda Adrian Donohoe in County Louth just over five years earlier.
- 5 March – Thousands of people were without electricity, while water rationing was imposed in some areas as the country recovered from the recent bad weather.
- 6 March – Ryanair chief executive Michael O'Leary becomes Ireland's latest billionaire, earning himself a place on Forbes's annual billionaire ranking.
- 8 March
  - The Cabinet agreed to hold a referendum asking voters to repeal the Eighth Amendment and "provision be made in law for the regulation of termination of pregnancy".
  - Former President Mary McAleese criticised the Catholic Church as "an empire of misogyny".
- 10 March – Tens of thousands of people marched through Dublin in one of the country's biggest ever anti-abortion demonstrations.
- 12 March
  - The Taoiseach, speaking at an event in Oklahoma, thanked members of the Choctaw Nation for the generosity shown by their ancestors to Ireland during the Great Famine.
  - There were 714 patients on trolleys or on wards awaiting admission to a hospital bed – the highest number ever recorded.
- 14 March
  - 36 people were arrested following days of Garda activity in the Kilkenny–Carlow area aimed at preventing crime and disrupting criminal activity.
  - Taoiseach Leo Varadkar confirmed that an invitation to US President Donald Trump to visit Ireland extended by his predecessor Enda Kenny still stands.
  - Students occupying Trinity College Dublin's dining hall in a protest over extra charges were denied access to toilets and water by security at the college, according to the students' union.
- 15 March – Taoiseach Leo Varadkar met US President Donald Trump in the White House where Trump said he would like to visit Ireland soon. He later had to clarify that he had not interfered in the planning process four years previously when Trump had asked him to intervene to block the creation of a wind farm near Trump's Doonbeg golf resort.
- 16 March – The Taoiseach met US Vice President Mike Pence at his official residence. In a break with protocol, the media were not in attendance, however, it is understood that the Taoiseach did raise the issue of gay rights.
- 17 March – The Irish rugby team beat England 24–15, winning the Grand Slam in addition to the 2018 Six Nations Championship secured a week earlier.
- 19 March – The European Union and Britain agreed that there must be a "backstop" solution to ensure that there is no hard border on the island of Ireland. A backstop agreement would fully align Northern Ireland with the rules of the EU in order to avoid a hard border.
- 20 March – Taoiseach Leo Varadkar discussed Brexit with German Chancellor Angela Merkel in Berlin during his first visit to the German capital as Taoiseach.
- 21 March
  - Pope Francis confirmed that he will make the first papal trip to Ireland in nearly 40 years, visiting Dublin for two days in August.
  - The second stage of the bill to allow for a referendum on the Eighth Amendment passed by a large majority in the Dáil by 110 votes to 32.
- 27 March
  - The Minister for Foreign Affairs, Simon Coveney, informed the Russian Ambassador to Ireland that the "accreditation of a member of his staff with diplomatic status is to be terminated".
  - The Minister for Health, Simon Harris, announced that the Cabinet approved the "general scheme" of the legislation on abortion that would be brought forward if the referendum on the Eighth Amendment was passed.
- 28 March
  - Ulster and Ireland rugby player Paddy Jackson was acquitted of rape and sexual assault, while his teammate Stuart Olding was acquitted of rape.
  - The government announced that the referendum on repealing the Eighth Amendment will take place on 25 May.
  - New figures revealed that there were 1,739 homeless families recorded in February.
- 29 March – The Save the 8th campaign was launched in Dublin. The group is campaigning for a "No" vote in May's referendum on the Eighth Amendment of the Constitution.
- 30 March
  - Pubs opened on Good Friday for the first time in 91 years.
  - The Department of Foreign Affairs and Trade confirmed that an Irish diplomat has been instructed to leave Russia.

=== April ===
- 1 April
  - The 1916 Easter Rising was commemorated around the country, while a military ceremony took place in O'Connell Street in Dublin.
  - Sinn Féin deputy leader Michelle O'Neill called for an Irish unity referendum within five years.
- 3 April – Heavy overnight rain forced an early end to the Easter festival at Fairyhouse Racecourse due to a waterlogged track.
- 4 April – President Higgins signed a warrant granting a posthumous pardon to Myles Joyce who was wrongfully convicted and hanged over the murder of five people in 1882.
- 6 April – Ultimate Fighting Championship (UFC) lightweight champion Conor McGregor was charged with assault, menacing and reckless endangerment at the UFC 223 media day in New York City.
- 7 April – Up to 10,000 people took part in a demonstration in Dublin to demand action over the continuing housing crisis.
- 9 April – Two American tourists died when a jaunting car overturned near the Gap of Dunloe, County Kerry.
- 10 April –
  - A man died after his fishing boat sank off the Mayo coast.
  - Events were held in Belfast to mark the 20th anniversary of the Good Friday Agreement.
- 12 April – Eir announced the loss of 750 jobs after a majority stake takeover by two French firms connected to a telecoms billionaire.
- 17 April – Enterprise Ireland launched €1 million for a competitive start fund for female entrepreneurs.
- 19 April – Minister for Communications Denis Naughten said he regretted expressing his own opinion to a public relations executive acting for Independent News & Media in relation to the company's proposed takeover of Celtic Media.
- 20 April – The harvesting of up to 1,000 silage bales began at Shannon Airport in an effort to help farmers with fodder shortages.
- 25 April – A County Meath man was in a critical condition after being assaulted before Liverpool's Champions League semi-final football match against Roma at Anfield.
- 26 April – CervicalCheck cancer scandal: The Health Service Executive (HSE) confirmed that 206 women developed cervical cancer after having a misdiagnosed smear in the free national screening programme.
- 29 April – After a week of uncertainty regarding cancer misdiagnoses, the HSE confirmed that the clinical director of CervicalCheck, Dr Gráinne Flannelly, has resigned from her post.

=== May ===
- 2 May – CervicalCheck cancer scandal: New information in the cervical cancer tests scandal revealed that up to 3,000 women may be at risk as a result of misdiagnoses.
- 3 May – It was announced that HSE director-general Tony O'Brien is to take a temporary leave of absence from the board of a U.S. medical company amid calls for him to stand aside from his position due to the continuing controversy over CervicalCheck.
- 4 May
  - A man was killed when the single-seater light aircraft he was piloting crashed near Ballina, County Mayo.
  - CervicalCheck cancer scandal: The HSE agreed to pay the €150,000-a-year cost of treatment for cervical cancer victim Vicky Phelan.
- 5 May – A report revealed that the national average rent for accommodation has risen to €1,261.
- 7 May – CervicalCheck cancer scandal: A number of individuals affected by the cervical cancer tests scandal revealed that they were in the process of suing the HSE, a cervical screening laboratory and a number of doctors.
- 8 May – Ryan O'Shaughnessy takes Ireland to its first Eurovision final since 2013, with the song "Together".
- 9 May – Transport Minister Shane Ross was accused by Mattie McGrath of picking his nose and not listening to rural TDs during a debate on his Road Traffic Bill.
- 10 May – Tony O'Brien announced that he would resign as director-general of the HSE on 11 May following the CervicalCheck cancer scandal.
- 11 May
  - Gardaí announced that they are investigating photographs posted online of two men, one dressed as a priest, engaged in sex on an altar of a rural Catholic church in Kildorrery, County Cork.
  - The government announced a package of supports including discretionary medical cards, travel and childcare expenses, and counselling services to women affected by the CervicalCheck scandal.
- 13 May – A 47-year-old man and a seven-year-old boy were killed in a light plane crash in County Offaly.
- 14 May – a 14-year-old girl, Ana Kriégel, is murdered in Lucan.
- 15 May – There were calls to expel the Israeli ambassador to Ireland following the killing of 58 Palestinians on the Gaza border.
- 16 May
  - The Acting Director General of the HSE, John Connaghan, apologised for the "confusion and alarm" that was created in relation to the CervicalCheck programme, as a result of the failure to communicate with the women affected.
  - Galway GAA hurler Davy Glennon was given 240 hours' community service, in lieu of seven concurrent two-year sentences, after he pleaded guilty to the theft of an estimated €70,000 from his employers to fund a gambling addiction.
- 17 May – A 41-year-old man was jailed for three years for the harassment of RTÉ newsreader and journalist Sharon Ní Bheoláin.
- 20 May – A 40-year-old armed man died following a shooting in Cherrywood by Gardaí searching for missing woman Jastine Valdez.
- 21 May – A body was found in the Puck's Castle area in south County Dublin by Gardaí searching for 24-year-old Jastine Valdez, who had been missing since the previous Saturday evening.
- 25 May –
  - A constitutional referendum on whether to repeal the ban on abortion in Ireland took place, with a landslide win of 66.4% to 33.6% for the repeal side.
  - A 13-year-old boy was charged with the murder of teenager Anastasia Kriegel, whose body was found in Lucan on 17 May.
- 26 May – Gardaí launched a murder investigation following a post-mortem examination on the body of an 18-year-old man found dead in a field in Dunleer.
- 29 May – The child and family agency Tusla said 126 people were incorrectly registered at birth between 1946 and 1969 by the former adoption society, Saint Patrick's Guild.
- 31 May – Two teenage boys died while swimming in a lake in a quarry outside Ennis, County Clare.

=== June ===
- 1 June – A 36-year-old man died after he was assaulted at a pub in Mitchelstown, County Cork.
- 3 June
  - A 27-year-old man was charged with the murder of Patrick O'Donnell at a pub in Mitchelstown two days earlier.
  - Gardaí began a murder investigation into the death of Monaghan man Séamus Bell following a post-mortem examination this afternoon.
  - A 20-year-old Irish tourist died after falling from an apartment block in the Mallorcan resort of Magaluf.
- 4 June – A 39-year-old man died following a collision between a van and a tractor near Buttevant, County Cork. Two teenagers were also injured in the crash.
- 5 June
  - A 30-year-old man died after a shooting at Bray Boxing Club. Two other men – including well-known trainer Pete Taylor – were injured in the incident.
  - More than 220 survivors of the Magdalene Laundries attended a special reception at Áras an Uachtaráin hosted by President Higgins.
  - A syndicate of 32 people from a hardware shop in Thurles, County Tipperary won the EuroMillions jackpot worth €17m.
- 6 June
  - More than 121,000 students began their Leaving and Junior Certificate exams.
  - Former Chief Executive of Anglo Irish Bank David Drumm was found guilty of a conspiracy to defraud and of false accounting.
  - Aer Arann announced that it is to terminate its contract to operate Public Service Obligation flights to the Aran Islands.
- 8 June
  - Leo Varadkar became the first Taoiseach to visit the Orange Order's headquarters in Belfast.
  - The EU's chief Brexit negotiator, Michel Barnier rejected British Prime Minister Theresa May's proposals for a backstop customs arrangement in Northern Ireland.
  - A 14-year-old boy was killed in County Donegal when the car he was driving on a dirt road crashed.
- 9 June – 2,505 women set a new Guinness World Record for the world's largest Skinny-Dip at a beach in County Wicklow.
- 12 June
  - A report on the CervicalCheck scandal recommended an immediate-assistance payment of €2,000 to women and their families.
  - All planned Irish Ferries sailings to France on the WB Yeats vessel this summer were cancelled due to a delay in the delivery of the new ferry.
- 13 June
  - An elderly husband and wife from the United Kingdom died in a two-vehicle crash near Dromkeen in County Limerick.
  - Met Éireann issued two weather warnings ahead of Storm Hector, which is expected to bring gusts of up to 125 km/h in parts of the south and northwest.
- 14 June
  - Latest figures revealed that the total number of people on waiting lists to be treated, or seen by a doctor, stood at over 707,000, the highest number recorded.
  - Up to 35,000 homes and businesses were left without power as a result of Storm Hector.
  - Mixed martial arts fighter Conor McGregor appeared in court in New York City on charges of assault, criminal mischief and reckless endangerment.
  - Prince Charles and the Duchess of Cornwall visited Cork for a round of engagements, which included a visit to the city's English Market.
- 15 June – James Quinn was convicted of the murder of gang criminal, Gary Hutch – but the jury ruled he was the getaway driver and not the gunman.
- 19 June
  - An investigation by the Health Information and Quality Authority (HIQA) revealed that the Child and Family Agency, Tusla, must take urgent action to address serious shortcomings in how it manages allegations of child sexual abuse.
  - Taoiseach Leo Varadkar apologised in the Dáil to members of the LGBT community who suffered as a result of the criminalisation of homosexuality.
- 20 June – Former Anglo Irish Bank chief executive David Drumm was sentenced to six years in prison for conspiracy to defraud, and false accounting.
- 21 June
  - The President of the European Commission Jean Claude Juncker addressed a joint session of the Oireachtas.
  - James Quinn was sentenced to 22 years in prison by a Spanish judge for the murder of Gary Hutch.
- 22 June – Former US Secretary of State Hillary Clinton was awarded an honorary doctorate of law from Trinity College Dublin.
- 23 June – Minister for Culture, Heritage and the Gaeltacht Josepha Madigan stepped in to perform most elements of Mass in her local church after a priest failed to arrive.
- 24 June
  - A special ceremony took place at Dublin Castle to commemorate the 60th anniversary of Ireland's involvement in United Nations peacekeeping missions.
  - First Minister of Northern Ireland Arlene Foster became the first leader of the Democratic Unionist Party to attend the Ulster Football Final.
- 25 June
  - Seven people were injured following a collision between a vehicle and pedestrians in Clondalkin.
  - In the first prosecution of its kind in the State, former Garda Jimell Henry was sentenced to three years in prison for passing information to criminals.
- 26 June
  - PSNI Deputy Chief Constable Drew Harris was appointed as the new Garda Commissioner following an international selection process.
  - Independent TD Michael Lowry and his company Garuda were fined €25,000 after being found guilty of a tax offence and failing to keep proper books of account.
  - Fianna Fáil announced that it will endorse President Higgins if he seeks a second term of office.
- 27 June – The Gaelic Athletic Association (GAA) backed down after a three-day standoff with the Kildare GAA team over the venue for their All-Ireland Qualifier clash with the Mayo team.
- 28 June
  - Met Éireann announced that the temperature of 32 °C recorded at Shannon Airport today was the highest in Ireland since 1976.
  - Retired detective Ben O'Sullivan and murdered detective Jerry McCabe were awarded the Freedom of Limerick at a ceremony in the city.
- 29 June – Terminally ill woman Emma Mhic Mhathúna settled her case against the Health Service Executive and a US laboratory for €7.5 million.

=== July ===
- 2 July
  - The Taoiseach and Minister for Foreign Affairs were in New York City to launch Ireland's bid for a non-permanent seat on the UN Security Council.
  - Irish Water banned the use of hosepipes in the Greater Dublin Area as efforts continued to conserve water during a heatwave.
- 3 July – Ryanair pilots balloted by the Irish Air Line Pilots' Association voted in favour of a 24-hour strike on Thursday 12 July.
- 4 July – Irish Water announced that a nationwide hosepipe ban will be in effect from 8am on 6 July until midnight on 31 July as the dry spell continued across the country.
- 5 July – 26-year-old Hasan Bal from Waterford was sentenced to two-and-a-half years in prison for providing funding for the so-called Islamic State.
- 6 July – The Road Traffic (Amendment) Bill was passed after heated exchanges in the Dáil with 75 TDs voting in favour and eight TDs voting against.
- 8 July – The National Day of Commemoration service took place at Collins Barracks, honouring Irish men and women who died in past wars or on United Nations service.
- 10 July
  - Michael D. Higgins confirmed that he will seek a second term as President of Ireland as an independent candidate.
  - Prince Harry and Meghan Markle began a two-day visit to Dublin.
  - Former Anglo-Irish Bank chief executive David Drumm received a 15-month suspended sentence for providing unlawful loans to a group of businessmen.
- 11 July
  - The Fine Gael parliamentary party decided that it should actively support Michael D. Higgins's bid for a second term as president."
  - The record dry spell was credited with the discovery of a previously unknown henge beside the Newgrange site in County Meath.
- 13 July
  - County Clare-based diver Jim Warny, who was involved in the rescue of the Thai boys football team from a cave complex, arrived back in Ireland.
  - Dáil Éireann rose for the summer holidays which will last until 28 September.
  - The Belfast homes of two prominent Sinn Féin members, Gerry Adams and Bobby Storey, were attacked with explosive devices.

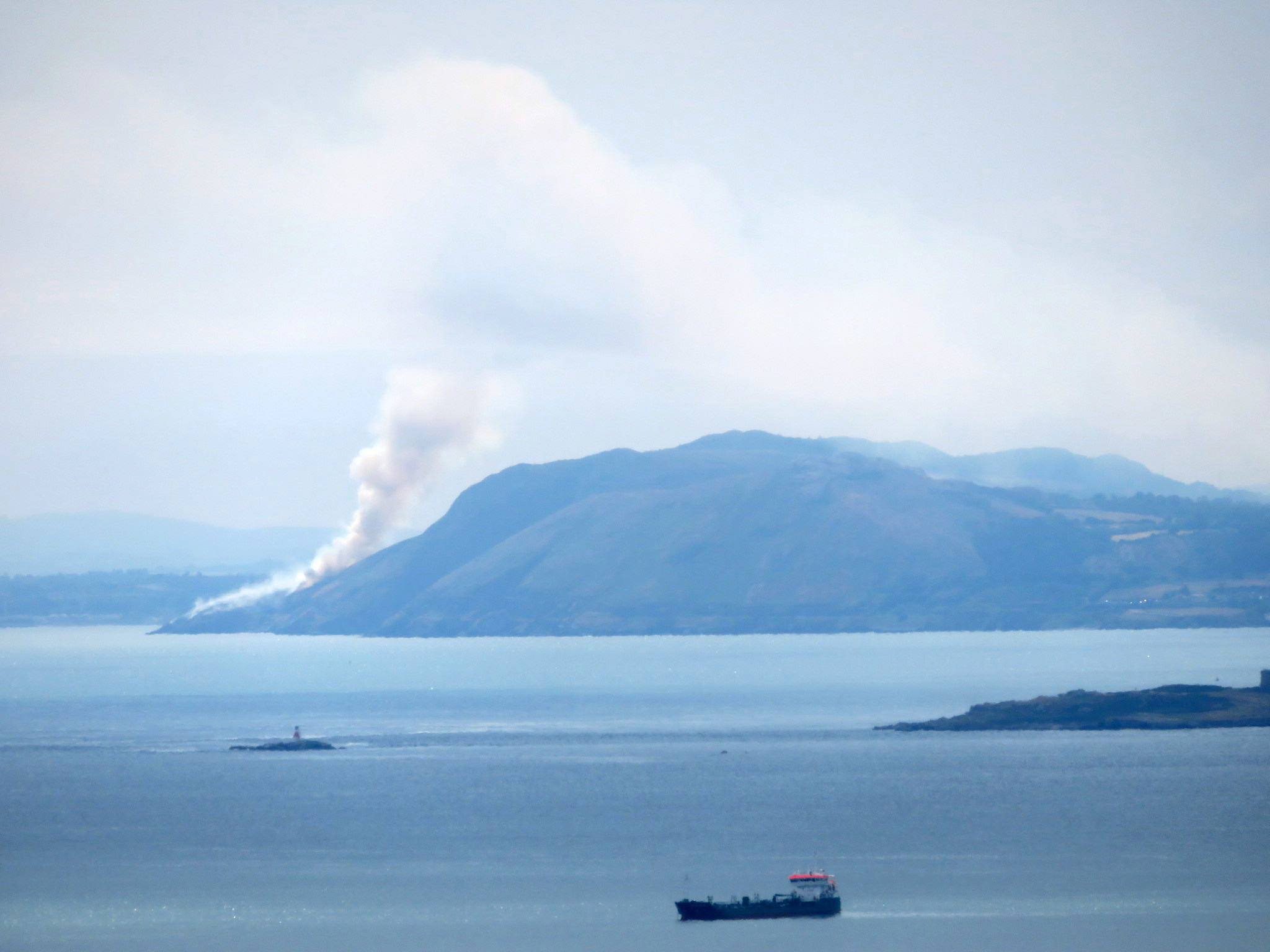
Wildfire on Bray Head, 13 July

  - The July fire season resumed when an uncontrolled campfire at Bray Head began at 01:00 and spread over the hill, consuming gorse. Homes were evacuated and train service halted while an Air Corps AW 139 helicopter lifted tonnes of water from the sea to drown the blaze. Aerial operations were then suspended at 16:45 for some hours because of the danger posed to the helicopter by people flying drones near the fire. Wicklow County Fire Service worked overnight and contained the fire. Before this operation, the Air Corps had already performed about 500 water drops over wildfires in the previous fortnight, dropping more than 620,000 litres of water around the drought-ridden country.
- 14 July
  - Sinn Féin announced that it is to contest the Presidential election, following a meeting of the party's Ard Comhairle.
  - Minister for Foreign Affairs Simon Coveney and DUP leader Arlene Foster visited Derry following six successive nights of violence in the city.
- 16 July – A megalithic passage tomb dating back some 5,500 years was discovered at the 18th century Dowth Hall in County Meath.
- 17 July
  - Two people died after their boat capsized in the sea off Malin Head in County Donegal.
  - The formation of TU Dublin, an amalgamation of three existing institutes of technology in the Dublin area – Dublin Institute of Technology, Institute of Technology, Blanchardstown, and Institute of Technology, Tallaght -, is announced.
- 18 July – The Cabinet held a meeting at Derrynane House, County Kerry where they discussed Brexit contingency plans.
- 20 July
  - Ryanair was forced to cancel 24 flights as the airline's Irish-based pilots conducted their second 24-hour strike.
  - The High Court refused permission to two people seeking to challenge the abortion referendum result.
- 22 July – A number of flights at Cork Airport were cancelled after the nose wheel of a private jet burst on the runway.
- 23 July – Independent Senator Gerard Craughwell announced that he will not be contesting the Presidential Election in the autumn.
- 25 July – On the third day of strike action by its pilots, Ryanair announced the possibility of further job cuts on top of the possible 300 announced on Wednesday.
- 26 July
  - Thirty-one homes around the country were searched by Gardaí as part of an investigation into the possession and distribution of child abuse images.
  - MMA fighter Conor McGregor was sentenced to five days community service and is to undergo an anger management programme as part of a plea deal.
- 27 July – Irish Water confirmed that the countrywide hosepipe ban introduced earlier this month will remain in place until the end of August.
- 30 July – The Minister for Finance agreed to pay Aidan Flanagan – a Garda and former Tipperary hurling captain – €1.16m for injuries he suffered when making an arrest.
- 31 July – A dispute over a €3.3m winning Lotto ticket was resolved when the Court of Appeal ruled that Mary Walsh must pay €560,000 to her stepson David Walsh plus his legal costs after finding her stepson was part owner of and entitled to a one-sixth share of the winning ticket.

=== August ===
- 1 August
  - Cork's English Market, one of the oldest municipal markets of its kind in the world, celebrated its 230th birthday.
  - Organisers of the Papal visit delayed issuing tickets over concerns about the number of people travelling to the event by car.
- 2 August – An Post stated that up to 161 post offices might close after they confirmed the same number of postmasters applied for the company's voluntary retirement package.
- 3 August – A post-mortem examination was to take place following the death of a transgender woman living in the male wing of a Direct Provision Centre in Galway.
- 4 August
  - The family of an Irishman who disappeared in 1985 were told that DNA analysis confirmed a match with a body that has remained unidentified in Wales since then.
  - A gorse fire on Bray Head in County Wicklow revealed an ÉIRE sign which dates from the Second World War.
- 5 August – CEO of Sport Ireland John Treacy said the Ireland women's hockey players did not have to each pay a levy of €550 to represent Ireland at the World Cup, despite reports that they had to because of a shortfall in funding.
- 6 August – Thousands of people gathered in Dublin city centre to welcome home Ireland's women's hockey team following their success at the Hockey World Cup.
- 8 August – The Policing Authority identified fundamental flaws in the reform process of the Garda Síochána, which it said were barriers to effective progress.
- 9 August – Oscar-winning screenwriter and director Neil Jordan donated his archive to the National Library of Ireland.
- 10 August – The HSE confirmed that the number of measles cases in an outbreak in Dublin had risen to 11.
- 15 August
  - A ceremony was held in Omagh to remember the 29 people who were killed and the hundreds injured by a Real IRA bomb on this day 20 years ago.
  - More than 57,000 students received the results of their Leaving Certificate exams at their schools.
- 16 August – Archbishop of Boston, Seán Patrick O'Malley, withdrew from the World Meeting of Families where he was to chair a debate on child safeguarding.
- 17 August – A new all-time high for private residential rents was reached for the ninth quarter in a row, according to a report from the property website Daft.ie.
- 18 August
  - Archbishop of Washington, Donald Wuerl, withdrew from the World Meeting of Families due to controversies about his role in cover-ups of clerical child sexual abuse.
  - Taoiseach Leo Varadkar said he wants Fianna Fáil to commit to a two-year extension of the confidence and supply deal, and agree to holding a general election in 2020.
- 19 August – Journalist Gemma O'Doherty announced her intention to run for the presidency.
- 20 August – Iarnród Éireann announced the development of a new railway station on the Maynooth commuter line at Pelletstown in West Dublin.
- 21 August – A woman in her 50s was arrested after she attempted to drive a Nissan Micra through the gates of Government Buildings.
- 25 August
  - Pope Francis began a 2-day visit to Ireland. It was only the second papal visit to Ireland ever and the first since Pope John Paul II in 1979.
  - In his first official engagement, the Pope held private discussions in Spanish with President Higgins on issues including climate change, inequality, poverty and migration.
  - In a speech in front of the Pope at Dublin Castle, the Taoiseach said that the history of the Catholic Church in Ireland was one of "sorrow and of shame."
  - At St. Mary's Pro-Cathedral, the Pope said a silent prayer at the Candle of Innocence to remember the survivors of clerical and institutional abuse.
  - After a journey through the streets of Dublin, the Pope visited the Capuchin Day Centre for Homeless People.
  - During a 90-minute meeting with eight Irish survivors of clerical, religious and institutional abuse, the Pope described those who covered up the abuse as "caca".
  - The Pope ended his first day in Ireland by attending the World Meeting of Families concert at Croke Park.
- 25 August
  - On the second day of his visit to Ireland, the Pope began by visiting Knock Shrine in County Mayo where he spoke about the "open wound" of clerical child sexual abuse.
  - 1,000 people held a silent vigil in Tuam to remember the Tuam Babies, while thousands attended the Stand4Truth event in Dublin to show solidarity with victims of abuse.
  - The Pope celebrated Mass at the Phoenix Park, however, according to an official statistic supplied by the Office of Public Works, fewer than 152,000 people attended, far short of the expected 500,000.
- 28 August
  - It was announced that more than 150 post offices around the country are to close as part of a deal reached between An Post and the Irish Postmasters' Union.
  - Minister for Housing, Planning and Local Government Eoghan Murphy confirmed that the Presidential Election will be held on Friday 26 October.
- 29 August – Businessman Seán Gallagher announced that he is going to seek a nomination to run for the presidency for a second time.
- 30 August
  - Virgin Media Television was officially launched, with new channel names and identities going live and replacing the old TV3 stations.
  - Businessman Peter Casey announced that he is seeking a nomination to contest the Presidential Election.
- 31 August – The American White House published a statement that Donald Trump would visit Ireland on 11 November. President Trump would visit France on the 11th as part of the commemoration of the 100th anniversary of the World War I armistice, and the Irish Government issued a statement that the Irish visit will probably follow this. Various political parties announced their intention to protest against the visit, while the Minister for Foreign Affairs and Trade stated that facilitation of the visit was not an Irish endorsement of Trump's politics. The White House cancelled the visit on 11 September.

=== September ===
- 3 September
  - Drew Harris was sworn in as Garda Commissioner at a ceremony at Kevin Street Garda Station in the early hours of the morning.
  - Gavin Duffy and Joan Freeman received endorsements from two separate county councils for nominations to run as candidates in the Presidential Election.
- 6 September
  - The inquest into the death of Dolores O'Riordan found that the singer-songwriter died by drowning due to alcohol intoxication.
  - Searches were carried out in at least five counties in the east of the country by Gardaí investigating a multimillion-euro fraud network.
- 10 September – Sean Gallagher and Joan Freeman secured nominations to contest the Presidential Election after receiving the support of four separate local authorities.
- 11 September
  - Minister for Health Simon Harris said he still plans to set up a Commission of Investigation into the CervicalCheck crisis, despite the author of the review into the controversy saying he did not think one was needed.
  - Donald Trump cancelled his visit to Ireland, planned for November, which he announced just 11 days ago. Both the announcement of the visit and its cancellation took the Irish government by considerable surprise.
  - Six people were arrested on North Frederick Street in Dublin in connection with the occupation of a house by a group of activists protesting over the housing crisis.
- 12 September
  - The Scally Report confirmed there was "a deficit of clear governance and reporting lines" between CervicalCheck, the National Screening Service and HSE management.
  - 1,000 protesters demonstrating over the eviction of people from a repossessed building blocked the junction between Dublin's Parnell Street and O'Connell Street.
  - The Cabinet approved the nomination of Edward F. Crawford as the new US ambassador to Ireland.
- 13 September – Mary Lou McDonald apologised to alleged sex abuse victim Máiría Cahill after a report found her case was failed by a disjointed police investigation.
- 14 September – Businessman Gavin Duffy secured a nomination to contest the Presidential Election after receiving the support of four local authorities.
- 16 September – Liadh Ní Riada was selected as the Sinn Féin candidate to contest the Presidential Election.
- 18 September
  - President Higgins signed the Thirty-Sixth Amendment of the Constitution Bill 2018, thereby repealing the Eighth Amendment and allowing for abortion legislation.
  - Businessman Peter Casey secured a nomination to contest the Presidential Election after receiving the support of four local authorities.
- 19 September
  - A Status Orange wind warning was in effect due to Storm Ali. Over 186,000 homes, businesses and farms were without power as a result of the storm.
  - A Swiss tourist in her 50s died after the caravan she was sleeping in blew off a cliff in Claddaghduff, County Galway due to Storm Ali.
  - The second day of the National Ploughing Championships in Tullamore was cancelled due to public safety concerns following extreme weather conditions.
- 22 September
  - Protesters staged a sit-down protest on O'Connell Bridge in Dublin as part of a rally calling for an end to evictions, more social housing and affordable rent.
  - Two investigations were launched after a woman drove through the gate of Áras an Uachtaráin, walked in the front door and accosted President Higgins a week earlier.
- 24 September
  - Nearly 100 children were evacuated from Drumgossatt National School near Carrickmacross when a sinkhole opened up on the grounds of the school.
  - Taoiseach Leo Varadkar highlighted the 20th anniversary of the Good Friday Agreement during a speech at the Nelson Mandela Peace Summit at the United Nations.
- 25 September – A Sinn Féin motion of no confidence in Minister for Housing, Planning and Local Government Eoghan Murphy was defeated in the Dáil by 59 votes to 49 votes with 29 abstentions.
- 26 September
  - The deadline for nominations to contest the Presidential Election passed.
  - 18-year-old student Rebecca Carter, who was in danger of losing her university place after the marks on one of her Leaving Certificate papers were incorrectly added up, won her case against the State Examinations Commission in the High Court.
- 27 September – A man who was late for a flight to Amsterdam was pinned down by Ryanair staff and police after running out of the Dublin Airport terminal onto the tarmac.
- 30 September – The bodies of three men were recovered from the water close to their upturned rib near Coonanna in South Kerry.

=== October ===
- 1 October
  - Twelve people were arrested as part of a continuing Garda investigation into child abuse.
  - Politician Peter Fitzpatrick resigned from the Fine Gael party and announced his intention to run in the next election as an independent candidate.
- 2 October
  - DUP leader Arlene Foster said the Good Friday Agreement should not be considered as a sacrosanct piece of legislation in Brexit negotiations.
  - Flights in and out of Cork, Shannon and Knock airports were temporarily suspended due to "significant air traffic issues" regarding the radar system at Shannon.
- 3 October
  - Thousands of people around the country took part in the Raise the Roof protest in Dublin to highlight the housing crisis.
  - Minister for Housing Eoghan Murphy acknowledged there was a "serious crisis" in housing as the Dáil debated a private members' motion on the issue.
  - The Public Health (Alcohol) Bill, which was before the Oireachtas since 2015, was passed. It introduced more stringent rules for the sale of alcohol.
- 4 October
  - The minister for health introduced the Regulation of the Termination of Pregnancy Bill in the Dáil to legalise abortion services in Ireland.
  - The government lost a Dáil vote by 83 votes to 43 on a motion tabled by the Solidarity–People Before Profit party to declare housing and homelessness a national emergency.
  - The office of the president announced that it would be handing around €200,000 back to the State from the underspend of the presidential allowance.
  - The Saint Lawrence family, which has owned Howth Castle and its 182 hectares (450 acres) desmesne for more than 840 years, announced their agreement to sell the property to an investment group.
- 5 October – Father-of-two Robert Sheridan was shot dead after he answered the door at his home at Poppintree Crescent in Ballymun, Dublin at around 11.15 pm.
- 6 October – Fighter Conor McGregor submitted to Khabib Nurmagomedov during a fight in Paradise, Nevada.
- 8 October – A murder investigation was launched after a 44-year-old man was found dead with suspected stab wounds and two other people were injured in Macroom, Cork.
- 9 October – The minister for finance, Paschal Donohoe, announced the 2019 Budget.
- 10 October
  - The funeral mass of Emma Mhic Mhathúna took place at the Pro-Cathedral in Dublin. Her funeral cortège later passed by Leinster House, Government Buildings, and Áras an Uachtaráin.
  - The Public Health (Alcohol) Bill was signed by the president. It introduced cancer warnings on labels (a development vigorously opposed by the alcohol industry), and the introduction of minimum pricing to prohibit cheap selling, and the regulation of alcohol marketing and advertising.
- 11 October
  - Denis Naughten resigned as minister for communications over revelations he met three times with the only bidder still in the national broadband plan process.
  - The third interim report of the Disclosures Tribunal vindicated Garda sergeant Maurice McCabe, former Garda commissioner Nóirín O'Sullivan, and former minister for justice Frances Fitzgerald; it severely criticised former Garda commissioner Martin Callinan and former Garda press officer Superintendent David Taylor.
- 12 October
  - Iarnród Éireann introduced a ban on alcohol on a number of Friday train services to Galway and Westport.
  - The Late Late Show was broadcast from the Central Hall in London. It was the third time since 1968 that the show travelled to London.
- 13 October – Richard Bruton was named as minister for communications while Joe McHugh was nominated as minister for education and skills.
- 14 October – Former Garda press officer, Superintendent Dave Taylor, applied to retire early from the Gardaí the day after being suspended from the force.
- 15 October – DUP leader Arlene Foster visited Dublin for talks with the taoiseach and Fianna Fáil party leader, Micheál Martin.
- 16 October – 119 Irish soldiers deployed to the Golan Heights and Syria returned home following a two-week delay due to diplomatic clearance.
- 18 October – A 21-year-old Italian man was found not guilty of causing grievous bodily harm to Seán Cox outside Anfield Stadium in Liverpool, England earlier this year.
- 19 October
  - The International Astronomical Union named a crater on the planet Mercury Carleton in honour of Irish author William Carleton (1794–1869).
  - National Slow Down day, a 24-hour operation aimed at getting motorists to watch their speed on roads, took place.
  - Presidential candidate Peter Casey temporarily suspended his campaign in light of the controversy over his earlier comments about Travellers.
- 21 October
  - Ardgillan Community College in Balbriggan was forced to close down a section of its building after significant structural flaws were discovered following a fire safety audit.
  - Presidential candidate Peter Casey announced that he intended to resume his campaign after suspending it for 48 hours.
- 23 October – It was announced that two Dublin primary schools with a combined enrolment of 1,200 are to close immediately following structural assessment inspections.
- 24 October
  - Bord na Móna announced that up to 430 workers are to be made redundant, with up to 150 expected to go by Easter next year.
  - The Irish language was heard in the British House of Commons for the first time since 1901 when Welsh member of parliament Liz Saville-Roberts used the language to make her opening remarks during a debate on the introduction of an Irish Language Act in Northern Ireland.
- 26 October
  - The people of Ireland voted to choose their president.
  - There was also a constitutional referendum to determine if the offence of blasphemy should be removed from the Constitution.
- 27 October – Michael D. Higgins was officially declared President of Ireland after receiving 822,566 first preference votes.
- 31 October
  - It was announced that Garda whistleblower Maurice McCabe was retiring at midnight from the Garda Síochána after 30-years of service.
  - Former Garda commissioner Nóirín O'Sullivan was appointed as the United Nations' Assistant Secretary-General for Safety and Security.

=== November ===
- 1 November
  - The Football Association of Ireland and the Irish Football Association launched a joint-bid to host the 2023 European Under-21 Championships.
  - Sinn Féin TD Peadar Tóibín was suspended from the party for six months after voting against abortion legislation.
  - Staff at Google offices around the world, including Dublin, staged an unprecedented series of walkouts in protest at the company's treatment of women.
- 2 November – Jonathan Keogh, Thomas Fox and Regina Keogh were each given life sentences after being found guilty of murdering Gareth Hutch in May 2016.
- 3 November – Labour Party leader Brendan Howlin called on his party's voters to also lend support to some other parties and progressive independents at the next election.
- 4 November – Hundreds of people attended an event in St. Stephen's Green to mark the arrival of a six-metre-high (20-foot) sculpture of a World War I soldier.
- 5 November
  - Bohemian F.C. were forced to change the design of their controversial 2019 away kit which was due to feature the image of Bob Marley because of image rights issues.
  - Footballer James McClean criticised reports that the English FA is to investigate his social media response to those who abused him for not wearing a poppy on his shirt.
- 6 November – Taoiseach Leo Varadkar was criticised for warning all hospital workers that they must work "at full whack" over the Christmas holidays.
- 8 November – Éamon Ó Cuív was sacked from the Fianna Fáil front bench after unveiling a Northern Ireland election candidate without the party's permission.
- 9 November – Taoiseach Leo Varadkar met his counterparts from England, Scotland and Wales at the 31st summit meeting of the British-Irish Council.
- 10 November – Hundreds attended the funeral mass of 20-year-old Gussie Shanahan, who had been missing for 18 years and whose remains were only recently identified.
- 11 November
  - President-elect Higgins led the State commemoration to mark the centenary of the Armistice which brought the first World War to an end in 1918.
  - The Taoiseach joined with more than 60 heads of state and government at a service at the Arc de Triomphe to commemorate 100 years since the end of World War I.
  - Michael D. Higgins was inaugurated for a second term as President of Ireland.
- 12 November – Sinn Féin said that some British political parties had made representations to it to abolish its policy of abstention and take up its seats at Westminster.
- 13 November
  - PBP Ruth Coppinger held up a lace thong in the Dáil to highlight a rape trial in which remarks were made about the 17-year-old complainant's underwear.
  - EU and UK Brexit negotiators agreed on a text that deals with the Irish border – there will be one backstop to avoid a hard border on the island of Ireland.
- 14 November
  - Following a Cabinet meeting earlier in the day, the Taoiseach announced that the proposed Brexit deal will be put to a vote in Dáil Éireann.
  - The heart of St Laurence O'Toole, Dublin's patron saint, was returned to Christ Church Cathedral in Dublin after it was stolen over six years ago.
- 15 November – Two weeks after being suspended from the party, Peadar Tóibín resigned from Sinn Féin with a view to establishing a new political party.
- 16 November – The Primary Response Agencies took part in a major emergency training exercise, simulating a terrorist attack, at Dublin City University.
- 17 November – At the Fine Gael Ard-Fheis, Taoiseach Leo Varadkar promised five years of income tax cuts if Fine Gael wins the next election.
- 18 November
  - Events took place across the country today to mark World Day of Remembrance for road traffic victims.
  - The body of a 30-year-old Irishman was discovered in the harbour in Havnegade area of the Danish capital, Copenhagen.
- 20 November – The HSE offered its "sincerest apologies" to the family of a woman who died after her jugular vein was torn during a routine surgical procedure two years ago.
- 21 November – A review of historical cases of allegations of abuse in Scouting Ireland found evidence of 71 alleged abusers and 108 victims between the 1960s and 1980s.
- 22 November – The World War I sculpture, 'The Hauntings Soldier', which was on display on St Stephen's Green in Dublin was vandalised with red paint.
- 24 November – Around 50 flights were impacted by an air traffic control radar fault at Dublin Airport.
- 25 November – The Taoiseach was one of 27 European Union leaders who endorsed the Brexit deal at a summit in Brussels.
- 26 November
  - A rape trial at the Central Criminal Court collapsed, following what the judge in the case described as "unprecedented media coverage" in the Irish Independent.
  - Former MEP Dana Rosemary Scallon settled her legal action against the Sunday World after the newspaper falsely stated that she engaged in a cover up of child abuse.
- 27 November – A review of the bidding process for the National Broadband Plan found that ex-minister Denis Naughten did not jeopardise or influence it.
- 29 November – Hurling and camogie were officially recognised by UNESCO as protected cultural activities.

=== December ===
- 1 December – Thousands of people took to the streets of Dublin in the latest campaign to highlight Ireland's housing crisis.
- 3 December – More than eight million cigarettes were seized by Revenue officers at Dublin Port.
- 5 December
  - A report on a review of 46,000 radiology scans at University Hospital Kerry found that 11 patients had their cancer diagnoses delayed and four of these patients later died.
  - A 66-year-old Irish lecturer was killed after being stabbed by a former student at a university in the Paris suburbs.
- 6 December – Convicted murderer Graham Dwyer won a legal action against the Garda Commissioner and the State over data from mobile phones.
- 7 December – The Minister for Health, Simon Harris, said he will extend the HPV vaccine to boys following recommendations by HIQA.
- 9 December – A Garda was hospitalised after an early-morning attack by two men, aged in their 30s and 60s, in Castlerea.
- 10 December – The annual Climate Change Performance Index deemed Ireland the worst country in the European Union on climate action for the second year in a row.
- 12 December – Fianna Fáil leader Micheál Martin said his party will guarantee the Government can continue throughout 2019 and an election may be held early in 2020.
- 13 December
  - Áras An Uachtaráin published the details of a €317,000 annual allowance provided to the Office of the President.
  - The Termination of Pregnancy Bill passed all stages of the Oireachtas.
- 14 December
  - The Taoiseach said he was satisfied with the conclusions agreed at the European Council, which said the Withdrawal Agreement for Brexit is not open for renegotiation.
  - Ex-Ireland and Ulster players Paddy Jackson and Stuart Olding, who were earlier acquitted of rape, lost a court bid to recoup the legal costs of their defence.
- 15 December – A local volunteer cleaning the area found the body of an infant on Bell's Beach in Balbriggan, County Dublin.
- 16 December – Eight people were injured, four vehicles were burned out and one dog was killed in an attack at a recently repossessed house near Strokestown.
- 17 December – An investigation began into the theft of a life-size bronze statue from the car park at W. B. Yeats' final resting place at St Columba's Church in Drumcliff.
- 18 December – Irish Ferries announced that it was unlikely to operate a service between Rosslare Europort and France next year.
- 19 December
  - The Government announced that it is to establish an independent statutory tribunal to deal with CervicalCheck claims.
  - The Government unveiled contingency plans to cope with a potential no-deal Brexit, identifying affected sectors that would require up to 45 pieces of emergency legislation.
- 20 December
  - Abortion was legalised, as President Michael D. Higgins signed the Regulation of Termination of Pregnancy Bill into law.
  - A man was arrested after he produced an imitation firearm and a device at a hearing at the family law courts in Dublin.
- 21 December – The Minister for Agriculture, Food and the Marine announced that large fishing boats are to be banned from trawling within six nautical miles of the Irish coast.
- 22 December
  - A 34-year-old man was shot dead outside his home as part of an ongoing gangland feud in West Dublin.
  - Gardaí began investigating a suspected arson attack on a branch of KBC Bank in Swords, County Dublin in the early hours of this morning.
- 25 December – More than 450 people attended the annual Christmas Day dinner for the homeless at the RDS in Dublin.
- 27 December – Taoiseach Leo Varadkar said he cannot guarantee the next general election will not be called before the planned 2020 date.
- 28 December – The National Maternity Hospital in Holles Street announced that it will accept referrals for abortion services from 7 January 2019.
- 29 December – The Taoiseach revealed that the excavation of a site at the former Bon Secours Mother and Baby Home in Tuam will begin in the latter stages of 2019.
- 31 December – The Department of Foreign Affairs said that a record 822,000 Irish passports were issued in the past 12 months, up around 43,000 from 2017.

== Sport ==
=== Association football ===
International friendly matches

- 26 March – Turkey 1–0 Ireland in Antalya.

=== Gaelic games ===
2018 All-Ireland Senior Hurling Championship Final

- 19 August – Limerick 3-16 Galway 2–18

2018 All-Ireland Senior Football Championship Final

- 2 September – Dublin 2-17 Tyrone 1–14

=== Rugby union ===
- 10 March – Ireland beat Scotland 28–8, winning the 2018 Six Nations Championship when France beat England on the same day.
- 17 March – Ireland beat England 24–15, winning the Grand Slam in addition to the 2018 Six Nations Championship secured a week earlier.
- 23 June – Ireland beat Australia in the third test match on their summer tour, winning the series 2–1.
- 17 November – Ireland beat New Zealand for the first time on home soil.

=== Women's hockey ===
- 5 August – Ireland were beaten 6–0 by the Netherlands in the 2018 Women's Hockey World Cup final.

== Arts and literature ==
- 23 February – The Pálás cinema in Galway opened, designed by Tom de Paor.

== Deaths ==
=== January ===
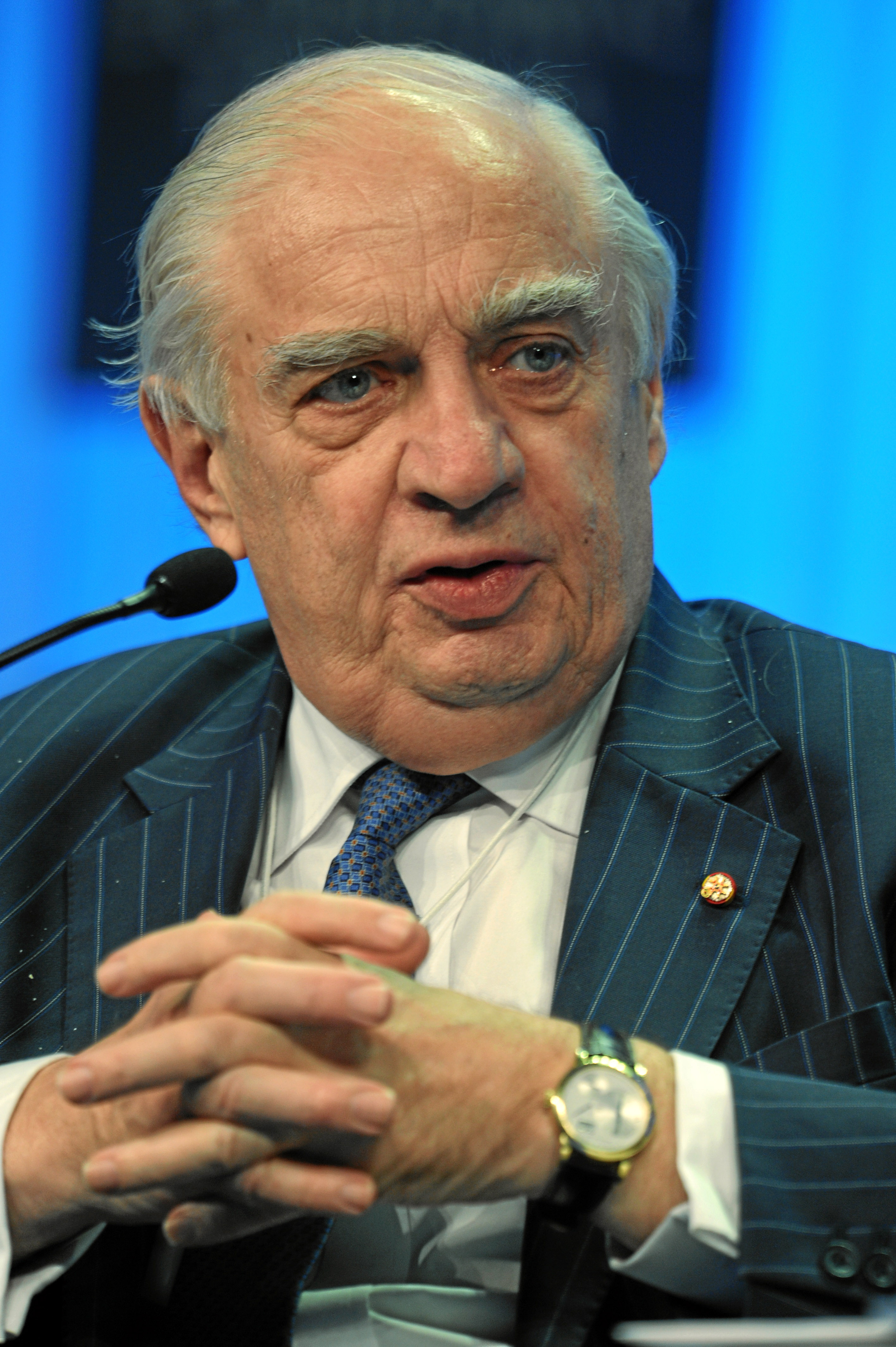
Peter Sutherland

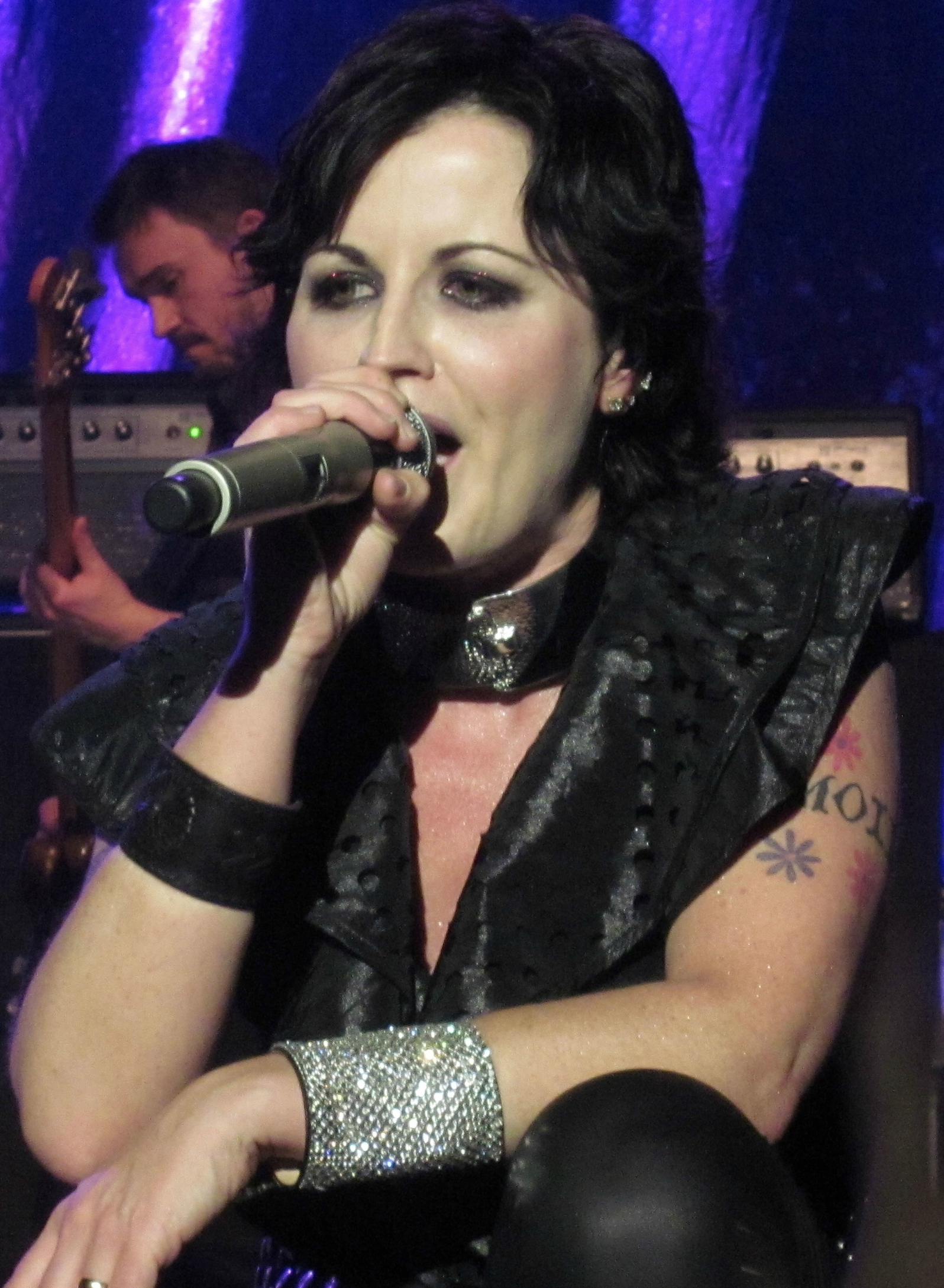
Dolores O'Riordan

- 1 January
  - Mick Murphy, 99, hurler (Tipperary).
  - Tim Sweeney, 88, hurler (Galway).
- 3 January – Donal Barrington, 89, judge and barrister.
- 5 January – Mick Murphy, 77, hurler (Tipperary), illness.
- 7 January – Peter Sutherland, 71, barrister, businessman and former Attorney General, illness.
- 8 January – Paddy Harte, 86, politician, TD (1961–1997) and Minister of State at the Department of Posts and Telegraphs (1981–1982).
- 9 January – Vivian Kennedy, 75, racehorse jockey and trainer.
- 12 January – Jim Kennedy, first president of the Ladies' Gaelic Football Association (1974–1977).
- 14 January – John Monaghan, 73, academic and social justice advocate, prostate cancer.
- 15 January – Dolores O'Riordan, 46, musician, singer-songwriter and lead singer with The Cranberries.
- 26 January – Pat Lynch, 84, singer, cancer.
- 27 January – Peter Casey, 82, horse trainer.
- 30 January
  - Pat McLoughney, 68, hurler (Offaly), cancer.
  - Richard Murphy, 90, poet.

=== February ===
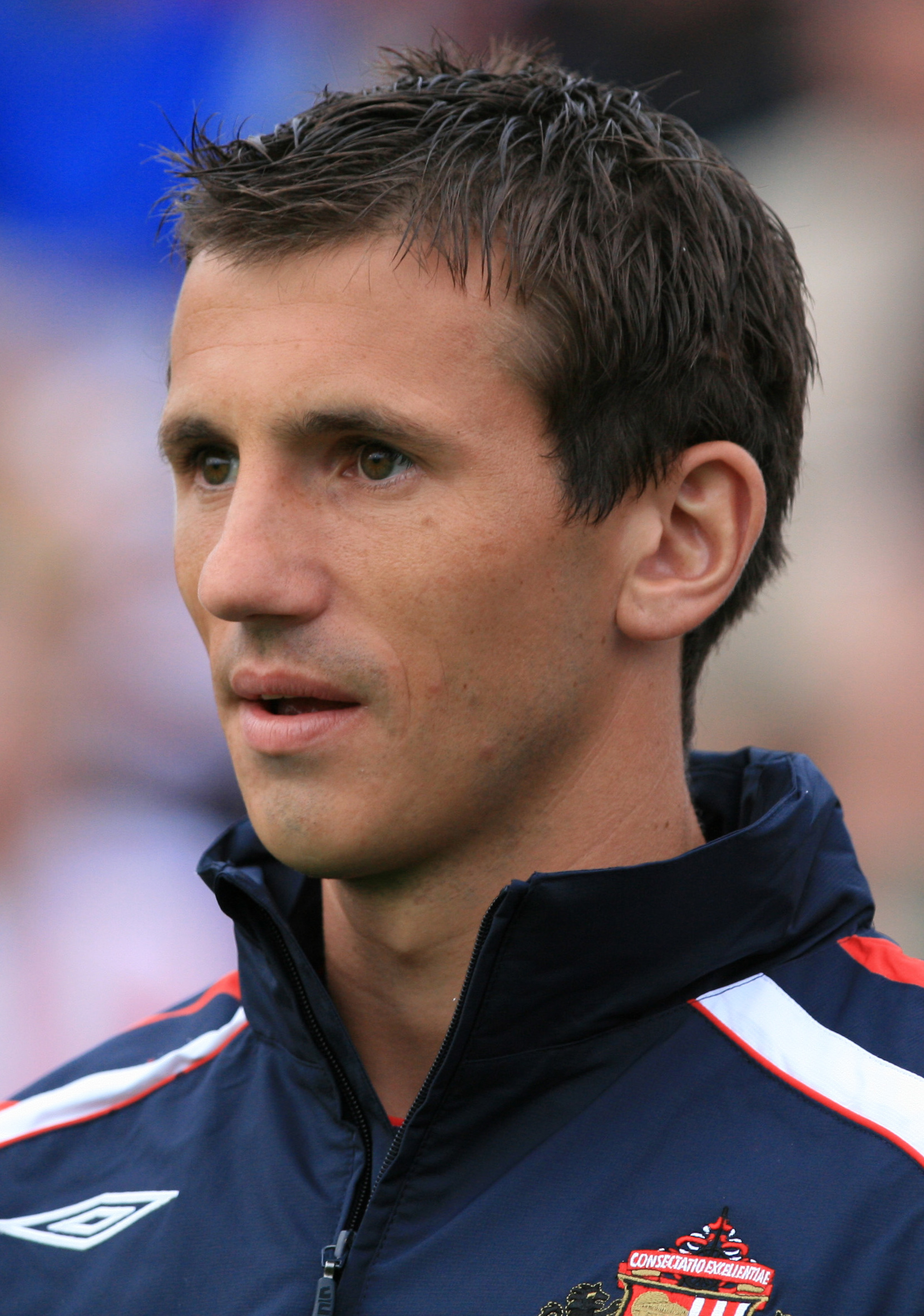
Liam Miller

- 4 February – Séamus Pattison, 81, politician TD (1961–2007), Minister of State for Social Welfare (1983–1987) and Ceann Comhairle (1997–2002), Parkinson's disease.
- 5 February – Seán O'Connor, hurler and referee (b. 1935)
- 9 February – Liam Miller, 36, footballer (Cork City, Celtic, Manchester United, national team), pancreatic cancer.
- 13 February
  - James Barrett, architect (Spire of Dublin).
  - John Robb, 85, surgeon and politician, Senator (1982–1989).
- 14 February – Jamie McCarthy, 33, distance runner, car crash.
- 19 February – Catherine Nevin, 67, convicted murderer, brain tumour.
- 20 February
  - Brendan Heneghan, 53, politician and businessman, heart attack.
  - Frank Norberg, 69, hurler (Cork).
- 28 February – Kieron Durkan, 44, footballer (national under-21 team), suicide.

=== March ===
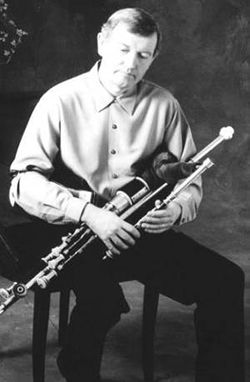
Liam O'Flynn

- 3 March
  - Emma Hannigan, 45, author, cancer.
  - Fred Perry, 84, businessman and golf official, road traffic collision.
- 4 March – Carmel McSharry, 91, character actress (Casualty, Z-Cars).
- 8 March – Pearse Lyons, 73, businessman, complications following heart surgery.
- 10 March
  - Garech Browne, 78, arts patron.
  - Val Mulkerns, 93, novelist.
- 14 March – Liam O'Flynn, 72, uileann piper, cancer.
- 17 March
  - Elisha Gault, 14, missing teenager, drowned
  - Ned Kavanagh, 93, hurler (Kilkenny).
- 19 March – Joseph Gallagher, 93, surgeon.
- 21 March – Jim Good, 94, Roman Catholic priest and academic.
- 23 March – Seán Treacy, 94, politician, TD (1961–1997), Ceann Comhairle (1987–1997).
- 31 March – Frank Murray, 76, civil servant.

=== April ===
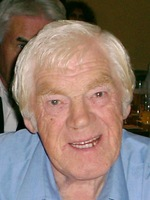
Big Tom

- 1 April – Joseph Mallin, 104, priest and the last surviving child of an executed leader of the 1916 Easter Rising (Michael Mallin).
- 2 April – Justin Nelson, 82, photographer, cameraman and television producer (RTÉ), Parkinson's disease.
- 7 April – Barney Sheehan, 84, writer and poet, Parkinson's disease.
- 9 April
  - Liam Devally, 85, broadcaster, singer, barrister and judge.
  - Timmy Matley, 36, singer (The Overtones), skin cancer.
- 10 April – Gerry McGuinness, 79, businessman and founder of the Sunday World.
- 17 April – Big Tom, 81, country music singer.
- 24 April – Tommy Varden, 79, businessman and Galway GAA sponsor, short illness.
- 29 April – Tony Lambert, musician (The Saw Doctors), heart condition.

=== May ===
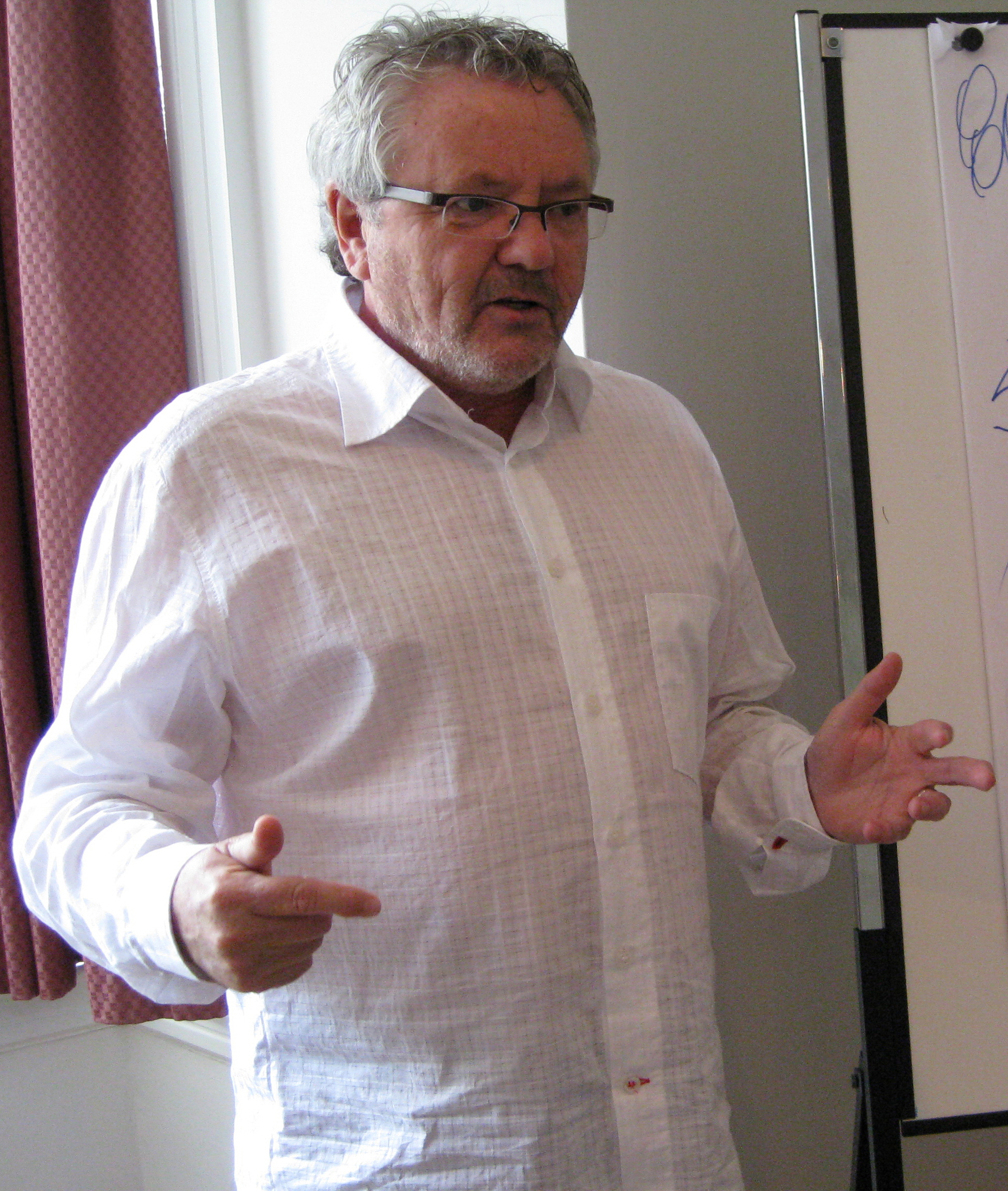
Kevin Tierney

- 3 May – Monica Barnes, 82, politician, Senator (1982) and TD (1982–1992 and 1997–2002).
- 5 May – Séamus Lagan, 71, Gaelic footballer.
- 8 May
  - Michael Stokes, 15, teenager who appeared on RTÉ's Room to Improve, accident.
  - Abigail Hennessy, actress and theatre director.
- 9 May – Arthur Fitzsimons, 88, footballer.
- 12 May – Kevin Tierney, 67, Irish-Canadian film producer and journalist, cancer.
- 14 May – T. P. Burns, 94, jockey.
- 15 May – Tom Murphy, 83, playwright.
- 16 May – Joe Byrne, 64, jockey.
- 18 May
  - Liam Ó Muirthile, 68, poet.
  - Christopher Jones, 82, Bishop of Elphin.
  - Sir Des Champs, 12, racehorse.
- 25 May – Brendan Ingle, 77, trainer, manager and former professional boxer.

=== June ===
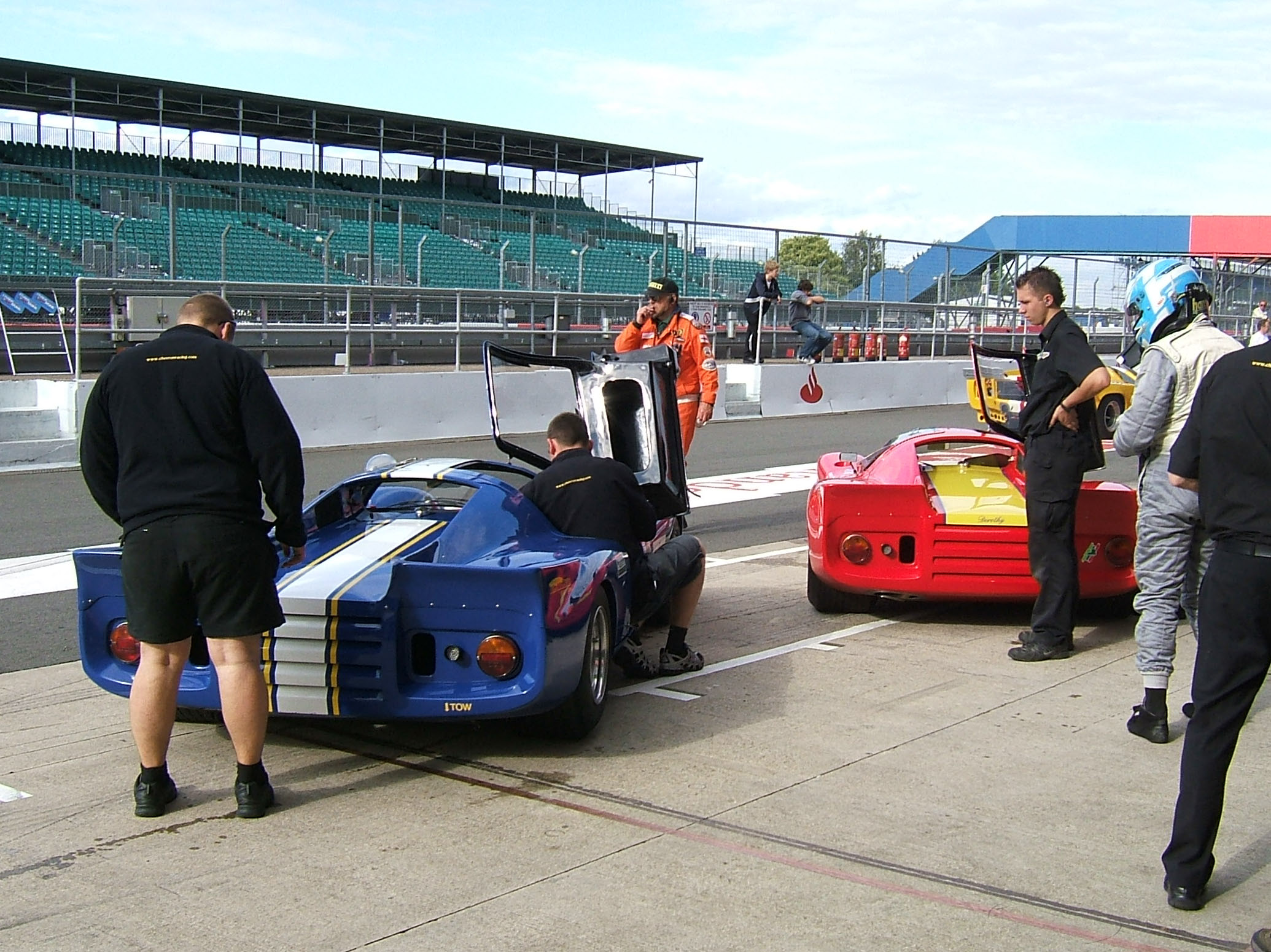
Martin Birrane's blue racing car

- 2 June – Seán McSweeney, 82, painter.
- 3 June – John Coolahan, 76, academic, teacher, author and educational adviser.
- 4 June – Seán Calleary, 86, politician, TD (1973–1992).
- 5 June
  - Micheál McKeown, 67, Ladies' Gaelic football manager (Louth), illness.
  - Stephen Swift, 44, actor (Fair City, Game of Thrones).
- 6 June – Alan O'Neill, 47, actor (Fair City, Sons of Anarchy).
- 9 June – Martin Birrane, 82, businessman, racing driver and team owner (Lola Cars).
- 13 June
  - Myrtle Allen, 94, chef and hotel manager, pneumonia.
  - Rory Kiely, 84, politician, Senator (1977–2007).
- 15 June – Macdara Woods, 76, poet.
- 17 June – John Blayney, 93, judge and rugby union player.
- 19 June – Ron Healey, 65, footballer (Manchester City, Cardiff City, national team).
- 24 June – Jack O'Brien, broadcaster (RTÉ Radio One), long illness.
- 25 June – Daniel Doyle, 31, convicted criminal and actor (Love/Hate), drug overdose.
- 28 June – John McCaughan, 38, hurler (London), short illness.
- 29 June – Derrick O'Connor, 77, actor.

=== July ===
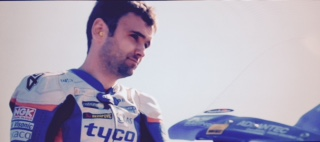
William Dunlop

- 7 July – William Dunlop, 32, motorcycle racer.
- 13 July – Laura Barry, 25, jockey.
- 18 July – Tadhg de Brún, RTÉ Gaelic games floor manager.
- 20 July – Martin O'Donoghue, 85, politician, TD (1977–1982), Minister for Economic Planning and Development (1977–1979), Minister for Education (1982) and Senator (1983–1987).
- 26 July – Achille Boothman, 79, hurler (Dublin).
- 29 July – Fiachra Ó Ceallaigh, 84, Roman Catholic prelate, Auxiliary Bishop of Dublin (1994–2009).
- 31 July – John Riordan, 72, former President of New York GAA.

=== August ===
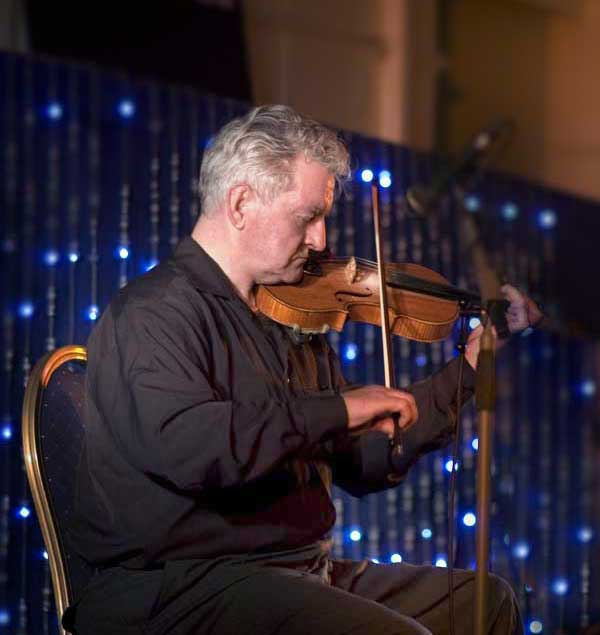
Tommy Peoples

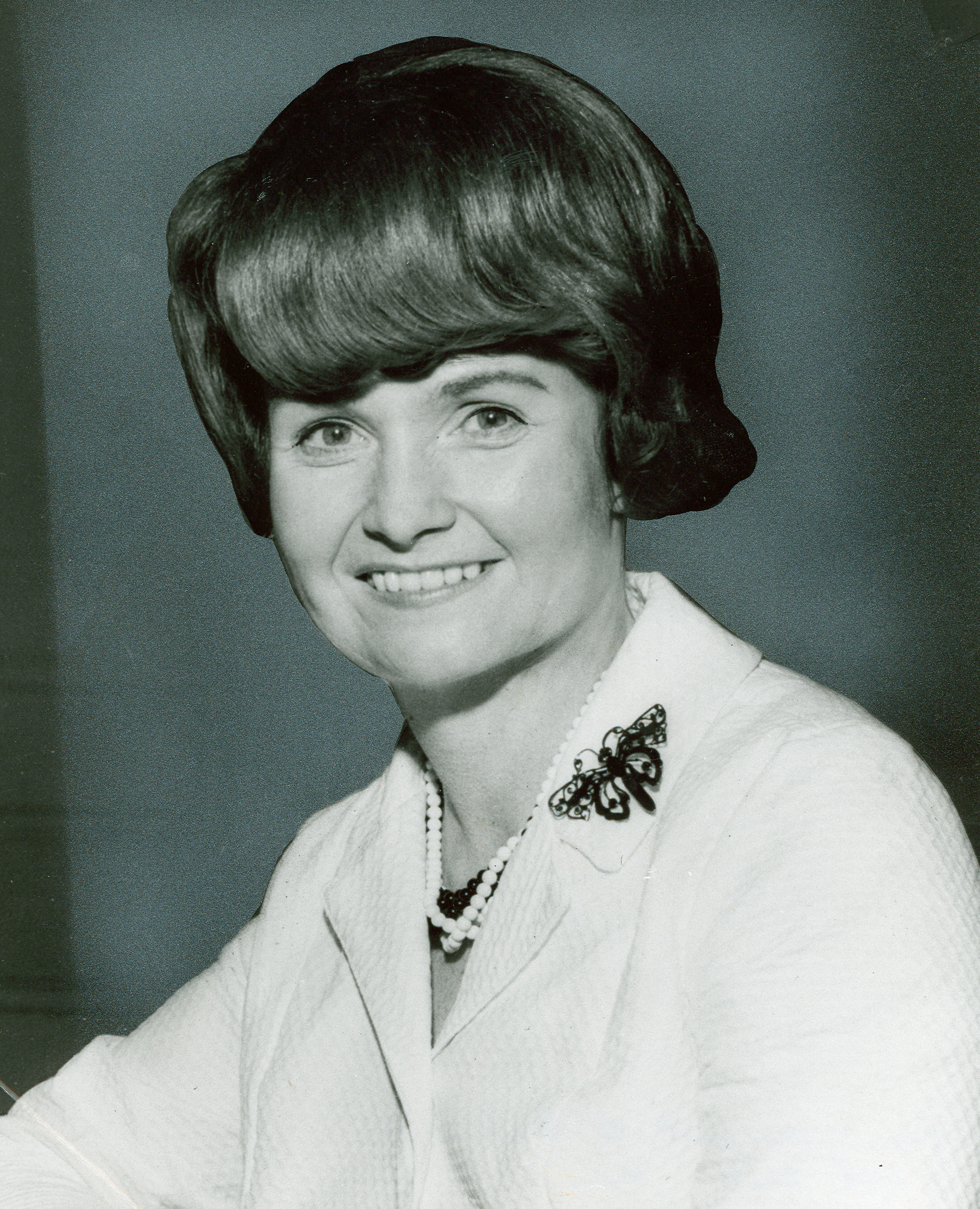
Margaret Heckler

- 4 August – Tommy Peoples, 70, fiddler.
- 5 August – Matthew Sweeney, 65, poet, motor neurone disease.
- 6 August
  - Margaret Heckler, 87, American politician and diplomat, United States Ambassador to Ireland (1986–1989), cardiac arrest.
  - Seán Cromien, 89, former Secretary-General of the Department of Finance, long illness.
- 7 August
  - Paddy Dolan, Gaelic footballer, (Leitrim), short illness.
  - Nan Joyce, 78, human rights activist (Irish Travellers).
- 12 August – Michael O'Flaherty, 86, businessman.
- 21 August – Michael O'Shea, 37, Gaelic footballer (Clare), cancer.
- 23 August – Mick O'Toole, 86, racehorse trainer (Dickens Hill).
- 25 August – Con Cooney, 84, hurler (Carrigaline, Fermoy, Cork).
- 31 August – Philip Short, 58, chess player.

=== September ===
- 6 September – Sylvia Meehan, 89, women's rights campaigner, long illness.
- 7 September – John Mulcahy, 86, publisher, editor and satirist, long illness.
- 19 September – Bunny Carr, 91, television presenter; public relations and media coach.
- 26 September
  - Sam Morshead, 63, jockey and horse racing administrator (Perth Racecourse), cancer.
  - Joe Carolan, 81, footballer (Manchester United, Brighton & Hove Albion, national team).
- 27 September – Richard Lewis, 73, couturier and fashion designer.
- 29 September – Billy Neville, 83, footballer (West Ham).
- 30 September – Dan McInerney, 93, building contractor and hurler (Scariff, Clare).

=== October ===
- 7 October – Emma Mhic Mhathúna, 37, CervicalCheck controversy campaigner, brain cancer.
- 10 October – Laurence Forristal, 87, Bishop of Ossory (1981–2007), short illness.
- 17 October – Paddy Duffy, 75, political adviser, heart attack.
- 19 October
  - Patsy Dan Rodgers, 74, King of Tory, long illness.
  - Tom Neville, 79, hurler (Wexford, Leinster).
- 20 October
  - Tom Peters, 74, Garda.
  - Philip McCabe, President of the International Federation of Beekeepers Associations.
- 21 October – Seymour Crawford, 74, politician, TD (1992–2011).
- 25 October – John Reynolds, 52, concert promoter.
- 28 October – Mick Archer, 75, hurler and Gaelic footballer (St. Finbarr's, Cork), short illness.

=== November ===
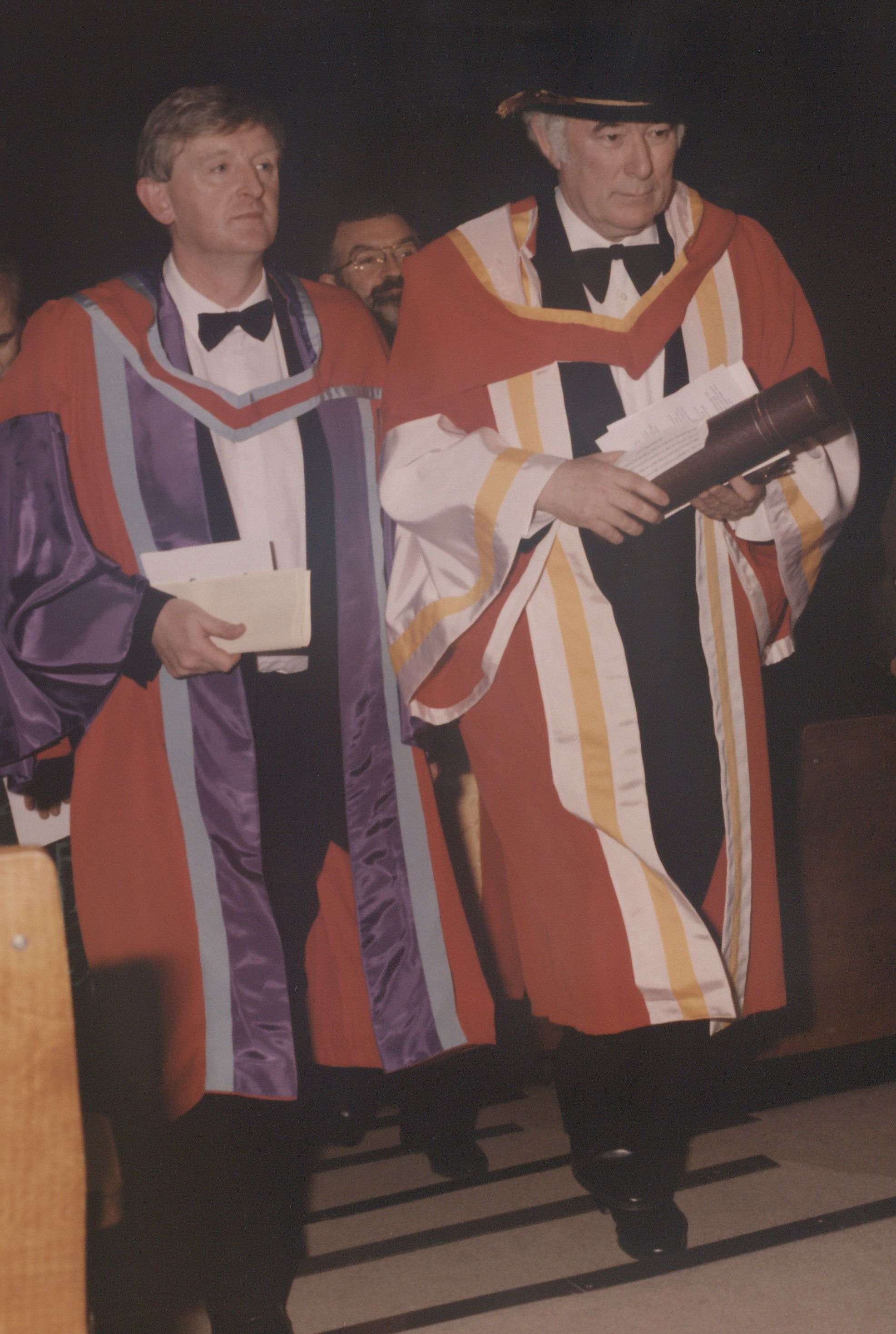
Mícheál Ó Súilleabháin (left)

- 2 November – Leonard Enright, 65, hurler (Patrickswell, Limerick), cancer.
- 3 November – Noel Hanlon, 78, businessman, cancer.
- 6 November – Cliffs of Moher, 4, thoroughbred racehorse, euthanised.
- 7 November – Mícheál Ó Súilleabháin, 67, musician, composer and academic.
- 8 November – Virginia Cole, 71, actress, cancer.
- 10 November – Paddy Clarke, Gaelic football manager (Louth, Ireland).
- 13 November
  - Paul McKeever, 39, Gaelic football referee (Antrim), illness.
  - James Mortell, army officer and first person to be seen on Telefís Éireann.
- 15 November – Sonny Knowles, 86, singer.
- 16 November – Alec Finn, 74, English-born trad musician (De Dannan).
- 18 November – Weeshie Fogarty, 77, Gaelic footballer (Killarney Legion, Kerry), referee and sports broadcaster (Radio Kerry).
- 19 November – Nan Ghriallais, sean-nós singer, long illness.
- 20 November – Sandy Harsch, 76, radio presenter, short illness.
- 22 November – Tom Considine, former Secretary-General of the Department of Finance, short illness.
- 26 November – Sinndar, 21, racehorse. (death announced on this date)

=== December ===
- 6 December
  - Dónall Farmer, 81, actor (Glenroe), film director and producer.
  - Jerome O'Shea, 87, Gaelic footballer (South Kerry, Kerry, Munster), short illness.
  - Peter O'Reilly, 78, fly fisherman and author.
- 13 December – Seán Garland, 84, politician, General Secretary of the Workers' Party (1977–1990).
- 23 December – Eileen Battersby, 60, American-born literary critic and author (Irish Times), traffic collision.
- 26 December – Jer O'Leary, 70s, actor (Michael Collins, In the Name of the Father).
- 29 December – Scott Doran, 44, Gaelic footballer (Wexford, London).
- 31 December – Mark Killilea Jnr, 79, politician, Senator (1969–1977 and 1982–1987), TD (1977–1982), Minister of State (1979–1981) and MEP (1984–1999).
