= Larry Kiely =

Irish sportsperson and military captain

Personal information
- Native name: Labhrás Ó Cadhla (Irish)
- Born: 6 April 1941 (age 85) Glengoole, County Tipperary, Ireland
- Occupation: Army officer
- Height: 5 ft 9 in (175 cm)

Sport
- Sport: Hurling
- Position: Centre-forward
Clubs
- Years: Club
- Gortnahoe–Glengoole; Military College; Air Corps; Young Irelands
Club titles
- Dublin titles: 2
Inter-county
Years	County	Apps (scores)
1963-1967	Tipperary	7 (0-08)
Inter-county titles
- Munster titles: 3
- All-Irelands: 2
- NHL: 2

Laurence Kiely (born 6 April 1941) is an Irish former hurler and show jumping rider. At club level he played with a number of sides, including Gortnahoe–Glengoole and Military College, and was also a member of the Tipperary senior hurling team. Kiely was also a member of the Army Equitation School and represented Ireland on a number of occasions.

== Early life ==
Born and raised in Glengoole, County Tipperary, Kiely first played hurling as a schoolboy in various juvenile competitions at Glengoole National School before later lining out as a student at the Patrician College in Ballyfin. He was a member of the Patrician College team that won the Leinster Colleges' JHC title in 1957. Kiely joined the Irish Army as a cadet in January 1961 and won an All-Army hurling medal with the Military College later that same year.

== Club career ==
Kiely began his club career at minor level with Gortnahoe. He was still eligible for the minor grade when he first lined out at adult level with the club and won a Mid Tipperary JAHC title in 1959. While playing at the Military College he won a Kildare SHC title after a 3-15 to 2-07 defeat of Ardclough in 1962. Kiely moved to Dublin and joined the Air Corps team after passing out. Players from Air Corps, Grocers and Crokes combined to form the Junior Board Selection and he won a Dublin SHC medal with them after a defeat of Young Irelands in 1963. Kiely later joined the Young Irelands team and he claimed a second Dublin SHC title after University College Dublin were beaten in the 1965 final.

== Inter-county career ==
Kiely began a three-year association with the Tipperary minor hurling team as a 16-year-old in 1957. He won his first Munster MHC medal that year before later lining out at centre-forward in the 4-07 to 3-07 win over Kilkenny in the 1957 All-Ireland minor final. After being beaten in the first round a year later, Kiely was appointed team captain for 1959. After winning a second provincial medal he captained Tipperary to a one-point win over Kilkenny in the 1959 All-Ireland minor final.

After being overage for the minor grade, Kiely was called up to the Tipperary junior hurling team in 1960. After a year out of inter-county hurling, he returned in 1962 as a member of the Kildare junior hurling team. After claiming that season's Leinster JHC title, Kiely was at full-forward when Kildare beat London by 4-07 to 2-04 in the 1962 All-Ireland junior final.

Kiely subsequently declared for Tipperary and made his senior team debut in a 4-07 to 1-11 defeat of Cork in the 1963 Munster semi-final. His second season with the team saw him claim his first silverware after Tipperary secured the 1963–64 National League title. Kiely won his first Munster SHC later that season before lining out at centre-forward in the 5-13 to 2-08 defeat of Kilkenny in the 1964 All-Ireland final. He was substituted early in the second half after complaining of a pain in his side, which later turned out to be appendicitis.

Illness kept Kiely out of Tipperary's successful 1965 Munster SHC campaign. He was recalled to the starting fifteen at centre-forward for the 2-16 to 0-10 defeat of Wexford in the 1965 All-Ireland final. Kiely ended the season by claiming a second successive National League title after a defeat of New York.

After an unsuccessful season in 1966, Kiely won a third Munster winners' medal after a defeat of Clare in the 1967 Munster final. He was dropped from the starting fifteen for the All-Ireland final against Kilkenny but came on as a substitute in the 3-08 to 2-07 defeat.

== Equestrian career ==
Kiely joined the Army Equitation School in 1962 and first jumped at international level four years later. He was included in the Irish Olympic Team for the 1968 Olympic Games in Mexico City but did not compete. Kiely's first major success in show jumping was when he rode Inis Cara to win the puissance in Wiesbaden in 1969. He shared first place in the puissance on Inis Cara at Madison Square Garden in 1970. Kiely was in Ireland's Nations Cup team that won in Ostend in 1971. He shared first place in puissance at the Dublin Horse Show with Inis Cara in 1973 and 1974. It was around this time that Kiely also held the world puissance record with Raimondo D'Inzeo of Italy (7 feet 2 inches). He again enjoyed Nations Cup success in Ostend in 1976 before retiring from international show jumping in 1978.

== Honours ==
Patrician College, Ballyfin

- Leinster Colleges Junior Hurling Championship: 1957

Gortnahoe

- Mid Tipperary Junior A Hurling Championship: 1958

Military College

- Kildare Senior Hurling Championship: 1962

Junior Board Selection

- Dublin Senior Hurling Championship: 1963

Young Irelands

- Dublin Senior Hurling Championship: 1965

Kildare

- All-Ireland Junior Hurling Championship: 1962
- Leinster Junior Hurling Championship: 1962

Tipperary

- All-Ireland Senior Hurling Championship: 1964, 1965
- Munster Senior Hurling Championship: 1964, 1965, 1967
- National Hurling League: 1963–64, 1964–65
- All-Ireland Minor Hurling Championship: 1957, 1959 (c)
- Munster Minor Hurling Championship: 1957, 1959 (c)

Munster

- Railway Cup: 1966

Sporting positions
Preceded by	Tipperary minor hurling team captain 1959	Succeeded by John O'Donoghue
Achievements
Preceded by Paddy Cobbe	All-Ireland Minor Hurling Final winning captain 1959	Succeeded by Willie Grace
