= Pat Ryan (Moycarkey–Borris hurler) =

Irish hurler

Personal information
- Native name: Pádraig Ó Riain (Irish)
- Born: 1938 (age 87–88) Littleton, County Tipperary, Ireland
- Height: 5 ft 10 in (178 cm)

Sport
- Sport: Hurling
- Position: Centre-forward
Club
- Years: Club
- Moycarkey–Borris
Club titles
- Tipperary titles: 0
Inter-county
- Years: County
- 1958-1964: Tipperary
Inter-county titles
- Munster titles: 2
- All-Irelands: 2
- NHL: 0

Patrick Ryan (born 1938) is an Irish former hurler. At club level he played with Moycarkey–Borris and at inter-county level was a member of various Tipperary teams at all levels.

== Career ==
Ryan first played hurling at club level with Moycarkey–Borris. He was part of the club's senior team that won Mid Tipperary SHC titles in 1965 and 1967. Ryan was also part of the Moycarkey team beaten by Thurles Sarsfields in the 1962 Tipperary SHC final.

At inter-county level, Ryan first played for Tipperary as part of the minor team that won three consecutive Munster MHC titles between 1954 and 1956. Two of these wins were later converted into All-Ireland MHC medals, with Ryan captaining the team to victory in 1956 in what was his last game in the grade.

Ryan made his senior team debut in 1958. He later dropped back to the intermediate team and won a Munster IHC medal in 1961. Ryan was recalled to the senior team following this and was a non-playing substitute for Tipperary's All-Ireland SHC title win in 1961. Ryan remained a peripheral figure with the team over the following few seasons, however, he was again listed amongst the substitutes for the defeat of Kilkenny in the 1964 All-Ireland final.

== Honours ==
Moycarkey–Borris

- Mid Tipperary Senior Hurling Championship: 1965, 1967

Tipperary

- All-Ireland Senior Hurling Championship: 1961, 1964
- Munster Senior Hurling Championship: 1961, 1964
- Munster Intermediate Hurling Championship: 1961
- All-Ireland Minor Hurling Championship: 1955, 1956 (c)
- Munster Minor Hurling Championship: 1954, 1955, 1956 (c)

Sporting positions
Preceded by Ray Reidy	Tipperary minor hurling team captain 1956	Succeeded by Jimmy Doyle
Achievements
Preceded by Ray Reidy	All-Ireland Minor Hurling Final winning captain 1956	Succeeded by Jimmy Doyle
