= Mick Murphy (Tipperary hurler) =

Irish hurler (1940–2018)

Personal information
- Native name: Mícheál Ó Murchú (Irish)
- Born: 1940 Thurles, County Tipperary, Ireland
- Died: 5 January 2018 (aged 77) Thurles, County Tipperary, Ireland

Sport
- Sport: Hurling
- Position: Left wing-back
Club
- Years: Club
- Thurles Sarsfields
Club titles
- Tipperary titles: 8
Inter-county*
Years	County	Apps (scores)
1960–1964	Tipperary	5 (0-00)
Inter-county titles
- Munster titles: 1
- All-Irelands: 1
- NHL: 1
- *Inter County team apps and scores correct as of 13:43, 6 September 2014.

Michael Murphy (1940 – 5 January 2018) was an Irish hurler who played as a left wing-back for the Tipperary senior team.

Born in Thurles, County Tipperary, Murphy first played competitive hurling whilst at school in Thurles CBS. He arrived on the inter-county scene at the age of fifteen when he first linked up with the Tipperary minor team before later joining the junior side. He made his senior debut in the 1960 Oireachtas Tournament. Murphy went on to enjoy a brief inter-county career with Tipperary, and won one All-Ireland medal, one Munster medal and one National Hurling League medal. He captained the team to the All-Ireland title in 1964.

At club level Murphy won eight championship medal with Thurles Sarsfields.

Murphy's uncles, Flor and John Coffey, were also All-Ireland medallists with Tipperary.

Throughout his career Murphy made 5 championship appearances for Tipperary. His retirement came following the conclusion of the 1964 championship.

== Playing career ==
=== College ===
Murphy played hurling during his schooldays at Thurles CBS. As a contemporary of Jimmy Doyle, Murphy won Dean Ryan Cup and Croke Cup medals. He missed out on the chance of winning a Dr. Harty Cup medal because the harsh economic realities of the time resulted in him leaving school to find work.

=== Club ===
Murphy played his club hurling with the famous Thurles Sarsfields club. The club had much success in the 1960s and Murphy won several Tipperary SHC titles on that team.

=== Inter-county ===
==== Minor ====
Murphy was in his sixteenth year when he was called up to the Tipperary minor team in 1956. He was an unused substitute that year as Tipperary claimed both Munster and All-Ireland titles.

In 1957 Murphy claimed a place on the starting fifteen. He won his first Munster medal on the field if play that year as Tipperary claimed a sixth successive provincial championship following a 3-8 to 1-4 defeat of Limerick. The subsequent All-Ireland decider saw Kilkenny provide the opposition. A narrow 4-7 to 3-7 victory gave Murphy his first All-Ireland medal on the field of play.

Murphy was eligible for the minor grade for a third successive year in 1958 and was appointed captain of the year. Tipperary's campaign ended prematurely with a defeat by Limerick.

==== Senior ====
Murphy made his senior debut on 23 October 1960 in the final of the Oireachtas Tournament. A 4-11 to 2-10 defeat of Cork made it a winning start, while he also claimed his first winners' medal.

After missing out on a place on Tipperary's championship team in 1961, Murphy joined the extended panel the following year. He made his senior championship debut on 30 June 1963 in a 4-7 to 1-11 Munster semi-final defeat of Cork. Tipperary were later beaten by Waterford in the provincial decider.

Tipperary bounced back in 1964 with Murphy collecting a National Hurling League medal following a 4-16 to 6-6 defeat of New York. Tipperary later cantered casually past Cork by fourteen points in the provincial decider, giving Murphy, who was captain of the team, a Munster medal. The All-Ireland final on 6 September 1964 saw Kilkenny enter the game as firm favourites against Murphy's side. John "Mackey" McKenna scored Tipp's first goal after ten minutes as the Munster champions took a 1-8 to 0-6 interval lead. The second half saw Tipperary score goals for fun, with Donie Nealon getting a hat-trick and Seán McLoughlin another. Kilkenny were humiliated at the full-time whistle as Tipperary triumphed by 5-13 to 2-8. It was Murphy’s sole All-Ireland medal while he also had the honour of collecting the Liam MacCarthy Cup.

Later that same year Murphy sustained a serious injury in a club game against Roscrea when he fell awkwardly and damaged his knee cartilage. The injury "brought the curtain down" on Murphy's hurling career at the young age of twenty-four.

== Honours ==
=== Player ===
Thurles Sarsfields

- Tipperary Senior Hurling Championship (8): 1956, 1957, 1958, 1959, 1961, 1962, 1963, 1964

Tipperary

- All-Ireland Senior Hurling Championship (1): 1964 (c)
- Munster Senior Hurling Championship (1): 1964 (c)
- National Hurling League (1): 1963–64
- Oireachtas Tournament (3): 1960, 1961, 1963
- All-Ireland Minor Hurling Championship (2): 1956 (sub), 1957
- Munster Minor Hurling Championship (2): 1956 (sub), 1957

Sporting positions
Preceded by Jimmy Doyle	Tipperary Minor Hurling Captain; 1958	Succeeded by Larry Kiely
Preceded by Seán McLoughlin	Tipperary Senior Hurling Captain; 1964	Succeeded by Jimmy Doyle
Awards and achievements
Preceded by Séamus Cleere (Kilkenny)	All-Ireland Senior Hurling Final winning captain 1964	Succeeded by Jimmy Doyle (Tipperary)
