= Matt Stapleton =

Irish hurler

Personal information
- Native name: Maitiú Mac an Ghaill (Irish)
- Born: 1939 (age 86–87) Borrisoleigh, County Tipperary, Ireland
- Occupations: Farmer, publican, ESB lineman
- Height: 6 ft 0 in (183 cm)

Sport
- Sport: Hurling
- Position: Right wing-back
Club
- Years: Club
- Borris-Ileigh
Club titles
- Tipperary titles: 0
Inter-county
- Years: County
- 1966-1968: Tipperary
Inter-county titles
- Munster titles: 1
- All-Irelands: 0
- NHL: 1
- All Stars: 0

Matthew Stapleton (born 1939) is an Irish former hurler. At club level, he played with Borris-Ileigh and at inter-county level was a member of the Tipperary senior hurling team.

== Career ==
Stapleton first played hurling at club level with Borris-Ileigh. His career coincided with a lean period in terms of success for the club, however, he ended his playing days by winning consecutive North Tipperary SHC medals in 1972 and 1973.

At inter-county level, Stapleton first played for Tipperary as a member of the minor team that beat Kilkenny in the 1957 All-Ireland minor final. He joined the senior team a decade later. Stapleton won a National League–Munster SHC double in 1968 before being a substitute on the team beaten by Wexford in that year's All-Ireland final.

== Honours ==
Borris-Ileigh

- North Tipperary Senior Hurling Championship: 1972, 1973

Tipperary

- Munster Senior Hurling Championship: 1968
- National Hurling League: 1967–68
- All-Ireland Minor Hurling Championship: 1957
- Munster Minor Hurling Championship: 1957
