= 1959 All-Ireland Minor Hurling Championship =

All-Ireland Minor Hurling Championship 1959
All Ireland Champions
- Winners: Tipperary (12th win)
- Captain: Larry Kiely

All Ireland Runners-up
- Runners-up: Kilkenny
- Captain: Martin Murphy

Provincial Champions
- Munster: Tipperary
- Leinster: Kilkenny
- Ulster: Antrim
- Connacht: Roscommon

The 1959 All-Ireland Minor Hurling Championship was the 29th staging of the All-Ireland Minor Hurling Championship since its establishment by the Gaelic Athletic Association in 1928.

Limerick entered the championship as the defending champions, however, they were beaten by Tipperary in the Munster final.

On 6 September 1959 Tipperary won the championship following a 2-8 to 2-7 defeat of Kilkenny in the All-Ireland final. This was their 12th All-Ireland title and their first in two championship seasons.

== Provincial changes ==
Due to a lack of competition in their own province, the Galway County Board proposed a regrading to junior status for their senior team in January 1958. This led to a wider debate regarding Galway's isolated position in a province where they faced little credible opposition. At a meeting of the Munster Council on 10 January 1959 it was decided to invite Galway to participate in all grades of hurling in Munster on a temporary basis. This decision was later ratified at the GAA Congress.

== Results ==
=== All-Ireland Minor Hurling Championship ===
Semi-finals

| 16 August 1959 Semi-final | Antrim | 3-01 - 6-05 | Kilkenny | Casement Park, Belfast |

| 23 August 1959 Semi-final | Roscommon | 0-03 - 8-14 | Tipperary | Dr. Hyde Park, Roscommon |

Final

| 6 September 1959 Final | Tipperary | 2-08 - 2-07 | Kilkenny | Croke Park, Dublin |

== Championship statistics ==
=== Miscellaneous ===
- Roscommon won the Connacht Championship for the first time in their history.
- The All-Ireland semi-final between Tipperary and Roscommon was the first ever championship meeting between the two teams.
