= 1962 All-Ireland Junior Hurling Championship =

1962 inter-county junior hurling championship

All Ireland Champions
- Winners: Kildare (1st win)

All Ireland Runners-up
- Runners-up: London

Provincial Champions
- Munster: Not Played
- Leinster: Kildare
- Ulster: Down
- Connacht: Roscommon

The 1962 All-Ireland Junior Hurling Championship was the 41st staging of the All-Ireland Junior Championship since its establishment by the Gaelic Athletic Association in 1912.

Kerry entered the championship as the defending champions, however, they were beaten by Kildare in the All-Ireland home final.

The All-Ireland final was played on 30 September 1962 at New Eltham in London, between Kildare and London, in what was their first ever meeting in the final. Kildare won the match by 4-07 to 2-04 to claim their first ever championship title.

== All-Ireland Junior Hurling Championship ==
=== All-Ireland semi-finals ===
12 August 1962 Semi-final	Kerry	4-08 - 4-06	Down	Austin Stack Park
	J Healy 3-2, M Wharton 1-0, P Sheehy 0-3, D Lucid 0-2, G O'Leary 0-1.		J O'Prey 2-1, G Coulter 1-1, S McGivern 1-1, C Mullan 0-2, S Savage 0-1, W Gordon 0-1.

26 August 1962 Semi-final	Roscommon	4-03 - 2-03 (declared void)	Kildare	Dr. Hyde Park

=== All-Ireland home final ===
9 September 1962 Home final	Kildare	7-15 - 5-02	Kerry	Croke Park
	L Kiely 3-4, N Kelly 2-0, M Leahy 1-3, K O'Malley 1-2, P Curley 0-3, S Schwer 0-3.		R McCarthy 3-0, M Wharton 1-1, D Lucid 1-0, P Sheehy 0-1.

=== All-Ireland final ===
30 September 1962 Final	London	2-04 - 4-07	Kildare	New Eltham
