= 1957 All-Ireland Minor Hurling Championship =

All-Ireland Minor Hurling Championship 1957
Championship Details
- Dates: 31 March 1957 – 2 September 1957
- Teams: 19

All Ireland Champions
- Winners: Tipperary (11th win)
- Captain: Jimmy Doyle

All Ireland Runners-up
- Runners-up: Kilkenny

Provincial Champions
- Munster: Tipperary
- Leinster: Kilkenny
- Ulster: Antrim
- Connacht: Galway

Championship Statistics
- Matches Played: 18
- Total Goals: 148 (8.2 per game)
- Total Points: 198 (11.0 per game)

The 1957 All-Ireland Minor Hurling Championship was the 27th staging of the All-Ireland Minor Hurling Championship since its establishment by the Gaelic Athletic Association in 1928. The championship began on 31 March 1957 and ended on 2 September 1957.

Tipperary entered the championship as the defending champions in search of a third successive title.

On 2 September 1957 Tipperary won the championship following a 4-7 to 3-7 defeat of Kilkenny in the All-Ireland final. This was their third All-Ireland title in-a-row and their 11th title overall.

== Team summaries ==
Team	Colours	Most recent success	
Team	Colours	All-Ireland	Provincial
Antrim	Saffron and white		1956
Carlow	Green, red and yellow		
Clare	Saffron and blue		
Cork	Red and white	1951	1951
Down	Red and black		1934
Dublin	Blue and navy	1954	1954
Galway	Maroon and white		1956
Kildare	White		
Kilkenny	Black and amber	1950	1956
Laois	Blue and white		1941
Limerick	Green and white	1940	1940
Meath	Green and gold		1929
Offaly	Green, white and gold		
Roscommon	Saffron and blue		
Tipperary	Blue and gold	1956	1956
Waterford	White and blue	1948	1948
Westmeath	Maroon and white		
Wexford	Purple and gold		
Wicklow	Blue and gold		

== Results ==
=== Connacht Minor Hurling Championship ===
Final	Galway	w/o - scr.	Roscommon

=== Leinster Minor Hurling Championship ===
31 March 1957 First round	Kildare	3-3 - 7-2	Wicklow	St. Conleth's Park

7 April 1957 Second round	Carlow	3-6 - 1-2	Wicklow	Dr. Cullen Park

14 April 1957 Second round	Offaly	4-2 - 1-3	Laois	St. Brendan's Park

14 April 1957 Third round	Westmeath	8-9 - 0-00	Meath	Newcastle

28 April 1957 Third round	Carlow	3-2 - 8-7	Offaly	Dr. Cullen Park

12 May 1957 Quarter-final	Offaly	5-5 - 3-8	Westmeath	O'Connor Park

30 June 1957 Semi-final	Dublin	2-6 - 4-11	Kilkenny	Croke Park

7 July 1957 Semi-final	Wexford	3-3 - 4-3	Offaly	Nowlan Park

4 August 1957 Final	Kilkenny	5-10 - 4-2	Offaly	Croke Park

=== Munster Minor Hurling Championship ===
First round

12 May 1957 First round	Clare	1-06 - 9-10	Cork	Gaelic Grounds, Limerick

26 May 1957 First round	Kerry	1-06 - 10-08	Tipperary	Gaelic Grounds, Limerick

Semi-final

16 June 1957 Semi-final	Limerick	6-12 - 3-02	Waterford	Cork Athletic Grounds, Cork

30 June 1957 Semi-final	Tipperary	6-06 - 4-04	Cork	Gaelic Grounds, Limerick

Final

14 July 1957 Final	Tipperary	3-08 - 1-04	Limerick	Thurles Sportsfield, Thurles
	J Doyle 1-2, S Ryan 1-1, Hogan 1-0, P Butler 0-2, P Doyle 0-2, Kennedy 0-1.		Murphy 1-1, Hogan 0-1, Hayes 0-1, Kennedy 0-1,	Referee: M Pollard (Waterford)

=== Ulster Minor Hurling Championship ===
21 July 1957 Final	Down	4-1 - 3-3	Antrim	St. Patrick's Park

=== All-Ireland Minor Hurling Championship ===
Semi-finals

28 July 1957 Semi-final	Tipperary	4-12 - 3-07	Galway	Croke Park, Dublin
	J Doyle 2-5, P Butler 1-3, P Doyle 1-1, S Ryan 0-2, M Murphy 0-1.		F Glynn 2-0, T Flanagan 1-0, F Keane 0-3, S Lyons 0-2, S Gohery 0-1, O Gannon 0-1.	Referee: C McLoughlin (Dublin)

11 August 1957 Semi-final	Down	1-00 - 14-11	Kilkenny	Casement Park, Belfast
	P Mullen 1-0.		T O'Connell 4-3, E Keher 3-1, B Lennon 3-0, D Walsh 2-0, M Dunne 1-3, P Maher 0-4, A Comerford 1-0.

Final

1 September 1957 Final	Tipperary	4-07 - 3-07	Kilkenny	Croke Park, Dublin
	P Butler 2-1, J Doyle 1-3, P Doyle 1-1, P Kennedy 0-1, S Ryan 0-1.		D Walsh 1-1, E Keher 0-4, J Doherty 1-0, M Dunne 1-0, A Comerford 0-1, T Bowe 0-1.	Referee: C McLoughlin (Dublin)

== Statistics ==
=== Miscellaneous ===
- Jimmy Doyle of Tipperary became the second player to win three All-Ireland medals as Kevin McGrath had already achieved this with Cork in 1937, 1938 & 1939. This has subsequently also achieved by John Buckley Cork in 1969. 1970 & 1971, John Troy Offaly 1986, 1987 & 1989 and Shane Morgan Galway in 2019, 2020 & 2021.
