= Alan O'Neill (actor) =

Irish actor

- Born: Michael Alan O'Neill; 1970; Dublin, Ireland
- Died: 6 June 2018 (aged 47); Los Angeles, California, United States
- Occupation: Actor
- Years active: 1997–2018
- Spouse: Yvonne Tobin
- Children: 3

Michael Alan O'Neill (30 December 1970 – 6 June 2018) was an Irish actor best known for his roles as Hugh in Sons of Anarchy and as Keith McGrath in the Irish soap Fair City. O'Neill was found dead in a friend's apartment in Burbank, California, United States, after suffering a fall and subsequently, what was later determined blunt force trauma to the head. No suspicious circumstances were suspected and his death was ruled accidental.

== Death ==
O'Neill was found dead by a friend in his apartment in Burbank, Los Angeles, California. The cause of death was blunt force trauma to the head, and was later ruled accidental.

== Filmography ==
=== Film ===
Year	Title	Role	Notes
2001	Strangers in the Night	Tony the Psychotic Ex-Boyfriend	Short
2007	32A	Paddy	
2009	Moore Street Masala	Robert	Short
2012	Shadow Dancer	RUC Officer	
2012	Invisible	Dennis	Short
2016	Urge	Captain	Final role

=== Television ===
Title	Year	Role	Network	Notes	Ref(s)
Ballyseedy	1997	Capt. Jim Clarke		Television movie	
Rebel Heart	2001	National Army Officer; Scout 1	BBC One	2 episodes Mini-series	
Keen Eddie	2003	Cop #4	FOX	1 episode	
Fair City	2006–2012	Keith McGrath	RTÉ One	70 episodes	
Inspector George Gently	2009	Barber	BBC One	1 episode	
Undercovers	2010	Bartender	NBC	1 episode	
Sons of Anarchy	2013–2014	Hugh	FX	Recurring; 7 episodes (seasons 6-7)	
Tim and Eric's Bedtime Stories	2014	Bartender	Adult Swim	1 episode	
