= Mick Murphy (hurler, born 1918) =

Irish hurler (1918–2018)

Personal information
- Native name: Mícheál Ó Murchú (Irish)
- Born: 1918 Kilmaley, County Clare, Ireland
- Died: 1 January 2018 (aged 99) Blanchardstown, County Dublin, Ireland
- Occupation: Draper

Sport
- Sport: Hurling
- Position: Right wing-back
Clubs
- Years: Club
- Kilmaley; Clarecastle; Thurles Sarsfields; Faughs
Club titles
- Tipperary titles: 3
Inter-county
- Years: County
- 1943–1947 1947–1949: Tipperary; Clare
Inter-county titles
- Munster titles: 1
- All-Irelands: 1
- NHL: 0

Michael Murphy (1918 – 1 January 2018) was an Irish hurler whose league and championship career with the Tipperary and Clare lasted from 1943 until 1949.

Born in Kilmaley, County Clare, Murphy first played competitive hurling in his youth. He first appeared on the Kilmaley team in the mid-1930s before winning a county intermediate championship medal in 1938. Murphy's prowess lead to him being selected for the Clarecastle senior team at a time when the club was allowed to select players from neighbouring areas. As a member of the Clarecastle team he ended up on the losing side in three senior championship finals between 1936 and 1939. A move to Thurles in 1940 saw Murphy join the Thurles Sarsfields team and go on to win three successive county senior championship medals between 1944 and 1946. He ended his career with the Faughs club in Dublin.

Success at club level brought Murphy to the attention of the county team selectors. He arrived on the inter-county scene at the age of twenty-five when he was first selected for the Tipperary senior team for the 1943 championship. A mainstay of the team over the following five years, Murphy won his sole All-Ireland in 1945, having earlier claimed a Munster medal. He later played with the Clare senior team before retiring from inter-county hurling after the 1949 championship.

Murphy died on 1 January 2018. At the time of his death he was the second oldest living All-Ireland medal winner.

== Honours ==
Thurles Sarsfields

- Tipperary Senior Hurling Championship (3): 1944, 1945, 1946

Tipperary

- All-Ireland Senior Hurling Championship (1): 1945
- Munster Senior Hurling Championship (1): 1945
