= Billy Neville (footballer) =

Irish footballer

William Neville (15 May 1935 – 29 September 2018) was an Irish footballer from Cork who played as a forward for West Ham United.

== Career ==
Neville played five games for West Ham in the 1957–58 season before being invalided out of the game, aged 22 with tuberculosis. He died on 29 September 2018.
