= Con Cooney =

Irish hurler and coach (1934–2018)

Personal information
- Native name: Conchur Ó Cuana (Irish)
- Born: 1934 Carrigaline, Ireland
- Died: 25 August 2018 (aged 84) Cork, Ireland
- Occupation: Secondary school teacher

Sport
- Sport: Hurling
- Position: Left wing-forward
Clubs
- Years: Club
- 1946–1977 1978–1986: Carrigaline; Fermoy
Club titles
- Cork titles: 0
Inter-county*
Years	County	Apps (scores)
1958–1959	Cork	2 (1–00)
Inter-county titles
- Munster titles: 0
- All-Irelands: 0
- NHL: 0
- All Stars: 0
- *Inter County team apps and scores correct as of 19:53, 8 September 2018.

Cornelius Cooney (1934 – 25 August 2018) was an Irish hurler and coach who played as a forward for club sides Carrigaline and Fermoy, at divisional level with Carrigdhoun and at inter-county level with the Cork senior hurling team.

== Playing career ==
=== Club ===
Cooney joined the Carrigaline club at a young age and played in all grades at juvenile and underage levels. He was just 12-years-old when he played for the Carrigaline junior hurling team in the league and made his championship debut two years later in 1948.

On 8 September 1974, Cooney was captain of the Carrigaline junior team that defeated Tracton by 3-10 to 2-06 in the South East Championship final.

After playing his last game for Carrigaline in 1977, Cooney transferred to the Fermoy club. He retired from club hurling after a 40-year career in 1986.

=== Inter-county ===
==== Minor and junior ====
Cooney first played for Cork at minor level in 1952. He was an unused substitute throughout the championship campaign which eventually ended with Cork being beaten by Tipperary in the Munster semi-final.

Cooney subsequently joined the Cork junior hurling team and made his first appearance on 15 May 1955 in a 4-10 to 6-02 Munster quarter-final defeat of Tipperary. He later won a Munster Championship medal after a 5-10 to 4-04 defeat of Clare in the final. On 1 October 1955, Cooney was at midfield when he won his first All-Ireland medal after a 6-10 to 0-02 defeat of Warwickshire in the final.

Over the following few seasons Cooney was a regular member of the Cork junior team and won a second Munster Championship medal in 1958 after a 6-09 to 3-05 defeat of Waterford in the final. On 5 October 1958, Cooney won a second All-Ireland medal following Cork's 7-1- to 4-02 defeat of Warwickshire in the final.

==== Senior ====
Cooney made his first appearance for the Cork senior hurling team on 23 November 1958 in a 4-05 to 2-03 National Hurling League defeat by Waterford. Later that season on 21 June 1959 he made his championship debut in a 4-13 to 1-03 Munster Championship semi-final defeat of Clare.

== Management and coaching career ==
Cooney served as trainer of the Kilworth junior hurling team and the St. Catherine's intermediate hurling team.

== Career statistics ==
Team	Year	National League			Munster		All-Ireland		Total	
Team	Year	Division	Apps	Score	Apps	Score	Apps	Score	Apps	Score
Cork	1958-59	Division 1A	3	2-01	2	1-00	—		5	3-01
Total			3	2-01	2	1-00	—		5	3-01

== Honours ==
Carrigaline

- South East Junior A Hurling Championship (1): 1974 (c)

Cork

- All-Ireland Junior Hurling Championship (2): 1955, 1958
- Munster Junior Hurling Championship (2): 1955, 1958
