= 1940 All-Ireland Minor Hurling Championship =

All-Ireland Minor Hurling Championship 1940
All Ireland Champions
- Winners: Limerick (1st win)
- Captain: Paddy McCarthy

All Ireland Runners-up
- Runners-up: Antrim

Provincial Champions
- Munster: Limerick
- Leinster: Laois
- Ulster: Antrim
- Connacht: Galway

The 1940 All-Ireland Minor Hurling Championship was the 13th staging of the All-Ireland Minor Hurling Championship since its establishment by the Gaelic Athletic Association in 1928.

Cork entered the championship as the defending champions in search of a record fourth successive title, however, they were beaten by Limerick in the Munster semi-final.

On 1 September 1940 Limerick won the championship following a 6-4 to 2-4 defeat of Antrim in the All-Ireland final. This was their first All-Ireland title.

== Results ==
=== All-Ireland Minor Hurling Championship ===
Semi-finals

4 August 1930 Semi-final	Antrim	5-03 - 4-05	Dublin	Croke Park, Dublin

11 August 1940 Semi-final	Limerick	5-06 - 1-02	Galway	Cusack Park, Ennis

Final

1 September 1940 Final	Limerick	6-04 - 2-04	Antrim	Croke Park, Dublin

== Championship statistics ==
=== Miscellaneous ===
- Dublin defeated Laois by 10-05 to 3-03 to win the Leinster Championship, however, they later forfeited the title after an objection regarding the playing of overage players was upheld by the Leinster Council.
- Antrim qualified for the All-Ireland final for the first and only time in their history.
- Limerick became the fifth team to win the All-Ireland Championship title.
