= Ned Kavanagh =

Irish hurler (1925–2018)

Personal information
- Native name: Éamonn Caomhánach (Irish)
- Nickname: Bus
- Born: 11 February 1925 Urlingford, County Kilkenny, Ireland
- Died: 17 March 2018 (aged 93) Sacramento, California, United States
- Occupation: Roman Catholic priest

Sport
- Sport: Hurling
- Position: Centre-back
Club
- Years: Club
- Tullaroan
Club titles
- Kilkenny titles: 1
Inter-county
- Years: County
- 1947: Kilkenny
Inter-county titles
- Leinster titles: 0
- All-Irelands: 1
- NHL: 0

Edward J. "Ned" Kavanagh (11 February 1925 – 17 March 2018) was an Irish hurler who played as a midfielder for the Kilkenny senior team.

Born in Urlingford, County Kilkenny, Kavanagh first played competitive hurling during his school days at St. Kieran's College. He arrived on the inter-county scene at the age of twenty-two when he first linked up with the Kilkenny senior team, making his senior debut in the 1947 championship. Kavanagh played for just one championship season and won one All-Ireland medal.

At club level Kavanagh won one championship medal with Tullaroan.

== Honours ==
=== Team ===
Tullaroan

- Kilkenny Senior Hurling Championship (1): 1948

Kilkenny

- All-Ireland Senior Hurling Championship (1): 1947
