= Sylvia Meehan =

Irish teacher and activist

- Born: 2 April 1929; Dublin, Ireland
- Died: 6 September 2018 (aged 89); Galway, Ireland
- Education: University College Dublin
- Known for: Activist on the rights of women and older people

Sylvia Meehan (2 April 1929 – 6 September 2018) was an Irish campaigner for the rights of women and older people. The National Women's Council of Ireland director Orla O'Connor said that she "was a trailblazer for women's equality. She campaigned tirelessly for the rights of women workers and older women".

== Early career ==
Meehan was born Sylvia Shiel on 2 April 1929 in Dublin. She gained her education first in the Loreto Sisters at North Great George's Street and then attended University College Dublin where she studied legal and political science. While there she became the first woman to win the Literary and Historical Association gold medal in 1951. She married and when her husband Denis died in 1969 she began her career working as a teacher of English and History in the Cabinteely School.

She and her husband had five children, John, Niall, Sarah, Richard and Rosa.

== Activism ==
Meehan joined the Association of Secondary Teachers, Ireland where she went on to become vice president, and became active in the women's movement. She chaired the women's committee of the Irish Congress of Trade Unions.

In 1977, Meehan was appointed the first chief executive of the Employment Equality Agency. Her position ensured research into problems facing girls and women. The specific areas tended to be issues in education and employment such as maternity leave and childcare. She was considered instrumental in achieving equal pay for women.

Meehan retired in 1992. She was president and founder of the Irish Senior Citizens Parliament and on the National Council on Ageing and Older People. In 1997 the University of Limerick awarded her a Doctor of Laws.

She died in Galway after a long illness in September 2018.
