= 1956 All-Ireland Minor Hurling Championship =

All-Ireland Minor Hurling Championship 1956
All Ireland Champions
- Winners: Tipperary (10th win)
- Captain: Pat Ryan

All Ireland Runners-up
- Runners-up: Kilkenny

Provincial Champions
- Munster: Tipperary
- Leinster: Kilkenny
- Ulster: Antrim
- Connacht: Galway

The 1956 All-Ireland Minor Hurling Championship was the 26th staging of the All-Ireland Minor Hurling Championship since its establishment by the Gaelic Athletic Association in 1928.

Tipperary entered the championship as the defending champions.

On 23 September 1956, Tipperary won the championship following a 4-16 to 1-5 defeat of Kilkenny in the All-Ireland final. This was their second All-Ireland title in-a-row and their tenth title overall.

== Results ==
=== All-Ireland Minor Hurling Championship ===
Semi-finals

29 July 1956 Semi-final	Kilkenny	4-08 - 2-04	Galway	Croke Park, Dublin

12 August 1956 Semi-final	Tipperary	12-10 - 1-00	Antrim	Croke Park, Dublin

Final

23 September 1956 Final	Tipperary	4-16 - 1-05	Kilkenny	Croke Park, Dublin
