= 1964 All-Ireland Senior Hurling Championship =

Championship details
- Dates: 10 May – 6 September 1964
- Teams: 13

All-Ireland champions
- Winning team: Tipperary (20th win)
- Captain: Mick Murphy

All-Ireland Finalists
- Losing team: Kilkenny
- Captain: Seán Buckley

Provincial champions
- Munster: Tipperary
- Leinster: Kilkenny
- Ulster: Not Played
- Connacht: Not Played

Championship statistics
- No. matches played: 12
- Top Scorer: Jimmy Doyle (1–27)
- Player of the Year: John Doyle
- All-Star Team: See here

The All-Ireland Senior Hurling Championship of 1964 was the 78th staging of Ireland's premier hurling knock-out competition. Tipperary won the championship, beating Kilkenny 5–13 to 2–8 in the final at Croke Park, Dublin.

== Format ==
Munster Championship

First round: (2 matches) These are two matches between the first four teams drawn from the province of Munster. Two teams are eliminated at this stage while the two winners advance to the semi-finals.

Semi-finals: (2 matches) The winners of the two first round games join the other two Munster teams to make up the semi-final pairings. Two teams are eliminated at this stage while the winners advance to the final.

Final: (1 match) The winner of the two semi-finals contest this game. One team is eliminated at this stage while the winners advance to the All-Ireland final.

Leinster Championship

First round: (2 matches) These are two matches between the first four teams drawn from the province of Leinster. Two teams are eliminated at this stage while the two winners advance to the second round.

Second round: (1 match) This is a single match between the two winners of the first round. One team is eliminated at this stage while the winners advance to the semi-finals.

Semi-finals: (2 matches) The winner of the second round joins the other three Leinster teams to make up the semi-final pairings. Two teams are eliminated at this stage while the winners advance to the final.

Final: (1 match) The winner of the two semi-finals contest this game. One team is eliminated at this stage while the winners advance to the All-Ireland final.

All-Ireland Championship

Final: (1 match) The champions of Munster and Leinster contest this game.

== Provincial championships ==
=== Leinster Senior Hurling Championship ===
May 10
First Round

Offaly	3–7 – 2–16	Westmeath
P. Molloy (1–6), L. Carroll (1–0), W. Gorman (1–0), J. Healion (0–1).		J. McGrath (1–4), C. Connaughton (1–3), T. Ring (0–6), M. Flanagan (0–3).

St Brendan's Park, Birr

May 10
First Round

Carlow	4–12 – 2–9	Laois
W. Hogan (2–1), J. McCarthy (1–2), L. Walsh (0–5), M. Morrissey (1–0), P. Brophy (0–2), P. O'Connell (0–1), P. McGovern (0–1).		P. Bates (0–5), J. Fitzpatrick (1–0), T. Maher (1–0), R. Campion (0–3), J. Lynos (0–1).

Nowlan Park, Kilkenny

June 7
Second Round

Carlow	2–9 – 1–9	Westmeath
L. Walsh (1–3), P. Brophye (1–0), P. McGovern (0–2), W. Hogan (0–1), M. Morrissey (0–1), T. Mitchell (0–1), J. Hickey (0–1).		C. Connaughton (1–1), J. McGrath (0–6), P. McCabe (0–2).

O'Moore Park, Portlaoise
Referee: E. Kelly

June 28
Semi-Final

Dublin	6–11 – 2–3	Carlow
F. Whelan (2–2), B. Galvin (2–1), N. Murray (2–1), M. Beringham (0–3), D. Foley (0–2), A. Boothman (0–1), W. Jackson (0–1).		W. Walsh (1–2), J. McCarthy (1–0), P. O'Connell (0–1).

Wexford Park, Wexford

July 5
Semi-Final

Kilkenny	5–9 – 4–8	Wexford
T. Forrestal (3–2), T. Murphy (1–1), T. Walsh (1–0), J. Teehan (0–2), E. Keher (0–2), D. Heaslip (0–1).		N. Wheeler (2–0), P. Lynch (1–1), T. Butler (1–0), J. Ormonde (0–2), O. McGrath (0–1), J. O'Brien (0–1), B. Rackard (0–1), M. Lyng (0–1).

Croke Park, Dublin
Attendance: 25,700

July 19
Final

Kilkenny	4–11 – 1–8	Dublin
J. Teehan (1–2), T. Murphy (1–2), D. Heaslip (1–2), T. Forrestal (1–0), E. Keher (0–3), T. Walsh (0–2).		M. Bermingham (1–2), A. Boothman (0–3), F. Whelan (0–1), W. Jackson (0–1), D. Foley (0–1).

Croke Park, Dublin
Attendance: 30,103
Referee: J. Dowling (Offaly)

=== Munster Senior Hurling Championship ===
May 24
Quarter-final

Clare	4–14 – 2–6	Limerick
P. Cronin (2–4), N. Jordan (1–3), J. J. Smyth (1–1), P. Henchy (0–3), S. Cleary (0–1), J. Dunne (0–1), J. Nevin (0–1).		M. Rainsford (1–0), D. Sheahan (1–0), P. Keane (0–3), A. O'Brien (0–1), K. Long (0–1), P. Cobbe (0–1).

McDonagh Park, Nenagh
Referee: D. Nealon (Tipperary)

June 7
Quarter-final

Cork	4–14 – 2–7	Galway
R. Browne (4–0), P. Harte (0–5), M. Archer (0–3), T. O'Mahoney (0–2), J. Bennett (0–1), G. McCarthy (0–1), P. FitzGerald (0–1), J. Hayes (0–1).		T. Purcell (1–4), M. Fox (1–1), M. Sweeney (0–1), J. Conroy (0–1).

Gaelic Grounds, Limerick
Referee: J. Smyth (Clare)

June 28
Semi-Final

Cork	4–10 – 5–6	Waterford
P. Harte (2–2), N. Gallagher (2–2), J. Bennett (0–2), M. Archer (0–1), J. O'Halloran (0–1), J. Sullivan (0–1), J. Hayes (0–1).		P. Grimes (2–3), J. Meaney (1–1), M. Flannelly (1–0), S. Power (1–0), F. Walsh (0–1), J. Byrne (0–1).

Thurles Sportsfield, Thurles
Attendance: 25,000
Referee: G. FitzGerald (Limerick)

July 5
Semi-Final

Tipperary	6–13 – 2–5	Clare
Jimmy Doyle (1–7), S. McLoughlin (2–0), M. Keating (0–4), L. Devaney (1–0), D. Nealon (1–0), T. Wall (1–0), J. McKenna (0–2).		P. Cronin (1–2), J. Smyth (1–2), S. Cleary (0–1).

Gaelic Grounds, Limerick
Attendance: 23,000

July 26
Final

Tipperary	3–13 – 1–5	Cork
Jimmy Doyle (0–10), S. McLoughlin (1–0), J. McKenna (1–0), D. Nealon (1–0), M. Keating (0–3).		J. O'Halloran (1–0), N. Gallagher (0–2), J. Bennett (0–2), J. Hayes (0–1).

Gaelic Grounds, Limerick
Attendance: 44,245
Referee: J. Smyth (Clare)

== All-Ireland Senior Hurling Championship ==
=== All-Ireland final ===
September 6
Final

Tipperary	5–13 – 2–8	Kilkenny
Jimmy Doyle (0–10), D. Nealon (3–0), J. McKenna (1–0), S. McLoughlin (1–0), M. Keating (0–2), M. Roche (0–1).		T. Walsh (1–2), J. Teehan (1–0), E. Keher (0–2), P. Moran (0–2), T. Forrestal (0–1), S. Cleere (0–1).

Croke Park, Dublin
Attendance: 71,282
Referee: A. Higgins (Galway)

== Statistics ==
=== Top scorers ===
==== Overall ====
Rank	Player	County	Tally	Total	Matches	Average
1	Jimmy Doyle	Tipperary	1–27	30	3	10.00
2	Donie Nealon	Tipperary	5–0	15	3	5.00
2	Tony Forrestal	Kilkenny	4–3	15	3	5.00
2	Pat Cronin	Clare	3–6	15	2	7.50

==== Single game ====
Rank	Player	County	Tally	Total	Opposition
1	Richie Browne	Cork	4–0	12	Galway
2	Tony Forrestal	Kilkenny	3–2	11	Wexford
3	Pat Cronin	Clare	2–4	10	Limerick
3	Jimmy Doyle	Tipperary	1–7	10	Clare
3	Jimmy Doyle	Tipperary	0–10	10	Cork
3	Jimmy Doyle	Tipperary	0–10	10	Kilkenny
7	Donie Nealon	Tipperary	3–0	9	Kilkenny
7	Philly Grimes	Waterford	2–3	9	Cork
7	Paddy Molloy	Offaly	1–6	9	Westmeath
10	Fran Whelan	Dublin	2–2	8	Carlow
10	Pat Harte	Cork	2–2	8	Waterford

== Miscellaneous ==
- Tipperary win their 20th All-Ireland title to become outright leaders on the all-time roll of honour for the first time since 1937.

== Player facts ==
=== Debutantes ===
The following players made their début in the 1969 championship:

Player	Team	Date	Opposition	Game
Peter Doolan	Cork	June 7	Galway	Munster quarter-final
Babs Keating	Tipperary	July 5	Clare	Munster semi-final
