= Huw Lawlor =

Irish hurler (born 1996)

Personal information
- Native name: Aodh Ó Leathlobhair (Irish)
- Born: 1 May 1996 (age 30) Kilkenny, Ireland
- Occupation: Gaelic games coach
- Height: 6 ft 2 in (188 cm)

Sport
- Sport: Hurling
- Position: Full-back
Club
- Years: Club
- O'Loughlin Gaels
Club titles
- Kilkenny titles: 1
College
- Years: College
- 2014-present: University College Dublin
College titles
- Fitzgibbon titles: 0
Inter-county*
| Years | County | Apps (scores) |
| 2018-present | Kilkenny | 13 (0-01) |
Inter-county titles
- Leinster titles: 4
- All-Irelands: 0
- NHL: 0
- All Stars: 3
- *Inter County team apps and scores correct as of 22:05, 17 July 2021.

Huw Lawlor (born 1 May 1996) is an Irish hurler who plays for Kilkenny Senior Championship club O'Loughlin Gaels and at inter-county level with the Kilkenny senior hurling team. He usually lines out as a full-back.

== Playing career ==
=== Kilkenny CBS ===
Lawlor first came to prominence as a hurler with Kilkenny CBS. He played in every grade of hurling before eventually joining the college's senior hurling team. On 9 March 2014, he lined out at right wing-forward when Kilkenny CBS defeated local rivals St. Kieran's College by 2–13 to 0–13 to win the Leinster Championship. Lawlor was again at right wing-forward when Kilkenny CBS faced St. Kieran's in the All-Ireland final on 5 April 2014. He ended the game on the losing side following a 2–16 to 0–13 defeat.

=== O'Loughlin Gaels ===
Lawlor joined the O'Loughlin Gaels club at a young age and played in all grades at juvenile and underage levels. He enjoyed championship success at minor and under-21 levels before joining the club's senior team.

On 30 October 2016, Lawlor won a Kilkenny Championship medal with O'Loughlin Gaels when he lined out at left wing-back in a 0–19 to 1–12 defeat of Ballyhale Shamrocks in the final.

=== Kilkenny ===
==== Under-21 ====
Lawlor first lined out for Kilkenny as a member of the under-21 team during the 2016 Leinster Championship. He made his first appearance on 25 May 2016 when he lined out at left corner-back in a 1–11 to 0–12 defeat by Westmeath.

On 5 July 2017, Lawlor won a Leinster Championship medal as a non-playing substitute following Kilkenny's 0–30 to 1–15 defeat of Wexford in the final. On 9 September, he lined out at right wing-back when Kilkenny suffered a 0–17 to 0–11 defeat by Limerick in the All-Ireland final.

==== Senior ====
Lawlor was added to the Kilkenny senior team as a member of the extended panel for the 2018 Leinster Championship. He made his first appearance for the team on 10 November 2018 when he lined out at full-back in Kilkenny's defeat by Galway in the Wild Geese Trophy.

On 27 January 2019, Lawlor made his competitive debut when he lined out at full-back in Kilkenny's 2–18 defeat of Cork in the National League. He made his first championship appearance on 11 May 2019 when he was at centre-back in Kilkenny's 2–23 to 1–21 defeat of Dublin. On 30 June 2019, Lawlor lined out at full-back when Kilkenny suffered a 1–23 to 0–23 defeat by Wexford in the Leinster final. He was again selected at full-back when Kilkenny suffered a 3–25 to 0–20 defeat by Tipperary in the 2019 All-Ireland final. Lawlor ended the season by being nominated for an All-Star.

On 14 November 2020, Lawlor won a Leinster Championship medal after lining out at full-back in the 2–20 to 0–24 defeat of Galway in the Leinster final.

== Career statistics ==
As of match played 17 July 2021.

| Team | Year | National League | | | Leinster | | All-Ireland | | Total | |
| Team | Year | Division | Apps | Score | Apps | Score | Apps | Score | Apps | Score |
|---|---|---|---|---|---|---|---|---|---|---|
| Kilkenny | 2018 | Division 1A | 0 | 0-00 | 0 | 0-00 | 0 | 0-00 | 0 | 0-00 |
| Kilkenny | 2019 | Division 1A | 2 | 0-00 | 5 | 0-00 | 3 | 0-00 | 10 | 0-00 |
| Kilkenny | 2020 | Division 1B | 5 | 0-00 | 2 | 0-01 | 1 | 0-00 | 8 | 0-01 |
| Kilkenny | 2021 | Division 1B | 5 | 0-00 | 2 | 0-00 | 0 | 0-00 | 7 | 0-00 |
| Career total | | | 12 | 0-00 | 9 | 0-01 | 4 | 0-00 | 25 | 0-01 |

== Honours ==
Kilkenny CBS

- Leinster Colleges Senior Hurling Championship: 2014

O'Loughlin Gaels

- Kilkenny Senior Hurling Championship: 2016
- Kilkenny Under-21 Hurling Championship: 2015
- Kilkenny Minor Hurling Championship: 2014

Kilkenny

- Leinster Senior Hurling Championship: 2020, 2021, 2022, 2023
- Leinster Under-21 Hurling Championship: 2017

Awards

- All-Star Award (3): 2022, 2023, 2025
- The Sunday Game Team of the Year (2): 2022, 2025
