= John Donnelly (hurler) =

Irish hurler (born 1998)

Personal information
- Native name: Seán Ó Donnaile (Irish)
- Born: 4 March 1998 (age 28) Waterford, Ireland
- Occupation: Student
- Height: 6 ft 0 in (183 cm)

Sport
- Sport: Hurling
- Position: Centre-forward
Club
- Years: Club
- Thomastown
Club titles
- Kilkenny titles: 1
College
- Years: College
- 2016-present: DCU Dóchas Éireann
College titles
- Fitzgibbon titles: 0
Inter-county*
Years	County	Apps (scores)
2017-present	Kilkenny	18 (0-22)
Inter-county titles
- Leinster titles: 4
- All-Irelands: 0
- NHL: 1
- All Stars: 0
- *Inter County team apps and scores correct as of 22:02, 17 July 2021.

John Donnelly (born 4 March 1998) is an Irish hurler who plays for Kilkenny Senior Championship club Thomastown and at inter-county level with the Kilkenny senior hurling team. He usually lines out as a centre-forward.

== Playing career ==
=== DCU Dóchas Éireann ===
As a student at Dublin City University, Donnelly immediately became involved in hurling and joined the college's freshers' hurling team in his first year. On 2 March 2017, he was selected at full-forward when Dublin City University faced the University of Limerick in the All-Ireland freshers' final. Donnelly was held scoreless but ended the game with a winners' medal following the 1–15 to 1-13 extra-time victory.

=== Thomastown ===
Donnelly joined the Thomastown club at a young age and played in all grades at juvenile and underage levels before eventually joining the club's top adult team in the Kilkenny Intermediate Championship.

=== Kilkenny ===
==== Minor and under-21 ====
Donnelly first lined out for Kilkenny as a member of the minor team during the 2015 Leinster Championship. He made his first appearance for the team on 25 April 2015 when he scored two points from play in a 1–18 to 1-17 extra-time defeat of Wexford. On 5 July 2015, Donnelly won a Leinster Championship medal after scoring two points from play in a 1–17 to 1–15 defeat of Dublin in the final.

Donnelly was eligible for the minor grade for a second consecutive year in 2016. He made his last appearance for the team on 14 May 2016 in a 2–18 to 1–19 defeat by Dublin.

Donnelly progressed onto the Kilkenny under-21 for the 2017 Leinster Championship. He made his first appearance for the team on 31 May 2017 when he lined out in a 0–21 to 0–16 defeat of Dublin. Donnelly won a Leinster Championship medal on 5 July 2017 after scoring two points from play in Kilkenny's 0–30 to 1–15 defeat of Wexford in the final. On 9 September 2017, he scored a point from centre-forward when Kilkenny suffered a 0–17 to 0–11 defeat by Limerick in the All-Ireland final.

Donnelly was eligible for the under-21 grade for a second consecutive year in 2018. He made his last appearance for the team on 20 June 2018 in a 3–13 to 1–17 defeat by Galway.

==== Senior ====
Donnelly joined the Kilkenny senior team at the start of the 2017 season. He was an unused substitute throughout the National League, Leinster Championship and All-Ireland Championship campaigns.

On 27 January 2018, Donnelly made his first appearance for the Kilkenny senior team. He was introduced as a 43rd-minute substitute for Conor Martin in a 1–24 to 0–24 defeat by Cork in the National League. On 8 April 2018, Donnelly was selected at left wing-forward when Kilkenny faced Tipperary in the National League final. He scored two points from play and collected a winners' medal following the 2–23 to 2–17 victory. Donnelly was selected on the bench when Kilkenny faced Galway in the Leinster final on 1 July 2018. He was introduced as a substitute for Richie Leahy in the 0-18 apiece draw. Donnelly broke onto the starting fifteen at right wing-forward for the replay a week later, however, he was substituted by Luke Scanlon in the 1–28 to 3–15 defeat.

On 30 June 2019, Donnelly was listed amongst the substitutes when Kilkenny faced Wexford in the Leinster final. He remained on the bench for the entire game which Kilkenny lost by 1–23 to 0-23.

== Career statistics ==
As of 13 February 2022

Team	Year	National League			Leinster		All-Ireland		Total	
Team	Year	Division	Apps	Score	Apps	Score	Apps	Score	Apps	Score
Kilkenny	2017	Division 1A	0	0-00	0	0-00	0	0-00	0	0-00
Kilkenny	2018	Division 1A	7	0-09	6	0-07	1	0-01	14	0-17
Kilkenny	2019	Division 1A	6	0-04	3	0-02	3	0-06	12	0-12
Kilkenny	2020	Division 1B	3	0-05	2	0-03	1	0-02	6	0-10
Kilkenny	2021	Division 1B	4	0-04	2	0-01	0	0-00	6	0-05
Kilkenny	2022	Division 1B	2	0-09	0	0-00	0	0-00	2	0-09
Total			22	0-31	13	0-13	5	0-09	40	0-53

== Honours ==
DCU Dóchas Éireann

- All-Ireland Freshers' Hurling Championship: 2017

Kilkenny

- Leinster Senior Hurling Championship: 2020, 2021
- National Hurling League: 2018
- Leinster Under-21 Hurling Championship: 2017
- Leinster Minor Hurling Championship: 2015
