= Luke Scanlon =

Irish hurler

Personal information
- Native name: Lúc Ó Scannláin (Irish)
- Born: 2 June 1996 (age 30) Kilkenny, Ireland
- Occupation: Student
- Height: 5 ft 11 in (180 cm)

Sport
- Sport: Hurling
- Position: Forward
Club
- Years: Club
- James Stephens
Club titles
- Kilkenny titles: 0
Inter-county*
Years	County	Apps (scores)
2017-present	Kilkenny	0 (0-00)
Inter-county titles
- Leinster titles: 0
- All-Irelands: 0
- NHL: 1
- All Stars: 0
- *Inter County team apps and scores correct as of 22:09, 25 February 2018.

Luke Scanlon (born 2 June 1996) is an Irish hurler who plays as a Goalkeeper for the Kilkenny senior team.

Born in Kilkenny, Scanlon first played competitive hurling at CBS Kilkenny, winning back-to-back Leinster medals in 2013 and 2014. He simultaneously came to prominence at juvenile and underage levels with the James Stephens club, winning a minor championship medal in 2012. Scanlon subsequently joined the James Stephens senior team.

Scanlon made his debut on the inter-county scene at the age of sixteen when he was selected for the Kilkenny minor team. He enjoyed two championship seasons with the minor team, culminating with the winning of an All-Ireland medal in 2014. He subsequently joined the Kilkenny intermediate team, winning an All-Ireland medal in 2016 before winning a Leinster medal with the under-21 team in 2017. Scanlan joined the Kilkenny senior team as a member of the extended training panel in 2017 and made his debut during the 2018 Walsh Cup.

== Career statistics ==
As of match played 25 February 2018.

Team	Year	National League			Leinster		All-Ireland		Total	
Team	Year	Division	Apps	Score	Apps	Score	Apps	Score	Apps	Score
Kilkenny	2017	Division 1A	0	0-00	0	0-00	0	0-00	0	0-00
Kilkenny	2018	Division 1A	2	1-01	0	0-00	0	0-00	2	1-01
Total			2	1-01	0	0-00	0	0-00	2	1-01

== Honours ==
CBS Kilkenny

- Leinster Colleges Senior Hurling Championship (2): 2013, 2014

James Stephens

- Kilkenny Minor Hurling Championship (1): 2012

Kilkenny

- National Hurling League (1): 2018
- All-Ireland Intermediate Hurling Championship (1): 2016
- Leinster Intermediate Hurling Championship (1): 2016
- Leinster Under-21 Hurling Championship (1): 2017
- All-Ireland Minor Hurling Championship (1): 2014
- Leinster Minor Hurling Championship (1): 2013, 2014
