= Conor Delaney (hurler) =

Irish hurler (born 1996)

Personal information
- Native name: Conchúr Ó Dúláinne (Irish)
- Born: 3 August 1996 (age 30) Castlecomer, County Kilkenny, Ireland
- Occupation: Teacher
- Height: 6 ft 1 in (185 cm)

Sport
- Sport: Hurling
- Position: Full-back/Corner Back
Club
- Years: Club
- Erin's Own
Club titles
- Kilkenny titles: 0
College
- Years: College
- DCU Dóchas Éireann
College titles
- Fitzgibbon titles: 0
Inter-county*
Years	County	Apps (scores)
2016–present	Kilkenny	45 (0-04)
Inter-county titles
- Leinster titles: 6
- All-Irelands: 0
- NHL: 3
- All Stars: 0
- *Inter County team apps and scores correct as of 11:09, 28 July 2019.

Conor Delaney (born 3 August 1996) is an Irish hurler who plays for Kilkenny Senior Championship club Erin's Own and at inter-county level with the Kilkenny senior hurling team. He usually lines out as a full-back.

== Playing career ==
=== DCU Dóchas Éireann ===
As a student at Dublin City University, Delaney joined the senior hurling team during his second year. On 24 February 2018, he lined out at centre-back when DCU Dóchas Éireann faced the University of Limerick in the Fitzgibbon Cup final, however, he ended the game on the losing side following a 2–21 to 2–15 defeat.

=== Erin's Own ===
Delaney joined the Erin's Own club at a young age and played in all grades at juvenile and underage levels before eventually joining the club's senior team in the Kilkenny Senior Championship.

=== Kilkenny ===
==== Minor and under-21 ====
Delaney was selected for the Kilkenny minor team for the first time during the 2013 Leinster Championship. On 7 July 2013, he won a Leinster Championship medal as an unused substitute following a 1–18 to 0–08 defeat of Laois in the final.

On 6 July 2014, Delaney lined out at full-back when Kilkenny faced Dublin in the Leinster final. He collected a second winners' medal - his first on the field of play - following a 2–19 to 2–10 victory. Delaney retained the full-back position for the All-Ireland final against Limerick on 7 September 2014 and ended the game with a winners' medal following the 2–17 to 0–19 victory.

Delaney was added to the Kilkenny under-21 panel prior to the start of the 2015 Leinster Championship. He made his first appearance in that grade on 2 June 2015 when he lined out at right corner-back in a 4–12 to 2–16 defeat of Dublin. On 8 July 2015, Delaney was switched to full-back when Kilkenny suffered a 4–17 to 1–09 defeat by Wexford in the Leinster final.

On 5 July 2017, Delaney won a Leinster Championship medal after lining out at full-back in the 0–30 to 1–15 defeat of Wexford in the final. On 9 September 2017, he was again at full-back for the All-Ireland final against Limerick. He ended the game on the losing side following the 0–17 to 0–11 defeat. Delaney ended the season by being named in the full-back position on the Bord Gáis Energy Team of the Year.

==== Intermediate ====
Delaney was added to the Kilkenny intermediate team in advance of the 2016 Leinster Championship. On 13 July 2016, he won a Leinster Championship when he lined out at centre-back in Kilkenny's 3–14 to 2–14 defeat of Wexford in the final. Delaney retained his position at centre-back for the All-Ireland final against Clare on 6 August 2016 and ended the game with a winners' medal after a 5–16 to 1–16 victory.

==== Senior ====
Delaney was added to the Kilkenny senior team as a member of the training panel at the start of the 2016 season. He was a Leinster Championship medal on 3 July 2016 as a member of the extended panel following Kilkenny's 1–26 to 0–22 defeat of Galway in the final. Delaney was again a member of the extended panel when Kilkenny suffered a 2–29 to 2–20 defeat by Tipperary in the All-Ireland final on 4 September 2016.

Delaney made his first appearance for the Kilkenny senior team on 18 February 2018 when he lined out at right wing-back in a 1–20 to 1–12 defeat of Waterford in the National League. On 8 April 2018, he was again at right wing-back when Kilkenny faced Tipperary in the National League final. He ended the game with a winners' medal following the 2–23 to 2–17 victory. On 1 July 2018, Delaney was selected amongst the substitutes when Kilkenny drew 0-18 apiece with Galway in the Leinster final. He was again named on the bench for the replay a week later, however, Kilkenny suffered a 1–28 to 3–15 defeat.

Delaney was a regular at full-back during the 2019 National League and looked likely to retain that position for the Leinster Championship. In April 2019, it was confirmed that he would be sidelined for up to two months after breaking the tibia bone in his leg. Delaney was an unused substitute when Kilkenny suffered a 1–23 to 0–23 defeat by Wexford in the Leinster final on 30 June 2019. Delaney was corner back throughout the 2020 season and finished that year with an All-Star Nomination after Kilkenny lost the All- Ireland Semi-Final to Waterford. Between 2021 and 2024, Delaney featured regularly at full back and corner back for Kilkenny winning 5 consecutive leinster medals and being runner-up in two All-Ireland finals.

== Career statistics ==
As of match played 27 July 2019.

Team	Year	National League			Leinster		All-Ireland		Total	
Team	Year	Division	Apps	Score	Apps	Score	Apps	Score	Apps	Score
Kilkenny	2016	Division 1A	0	0-00	0	0-00	0	0-00	0	0-00
Kilkenny	2017	Division 1A	0	0-00	0	0-00	0	0-00	0	0-00
Kilkenny	2018	Division 1A	5	0-00	3	0-00	0	0-00	8	0-00
Kilkenny	2019	Division 1A	5	0-03	0	0-00	1	0-00	6	0-03
Career total			10	0-03	3	0-00	1	0-00	14	0-03

== Honours ==
Kilkenny

- Leinster Senior Hurling Championship (1): 2016
- All-Ireland Intermediate Hurling Championship (1): 2016
- Leinster Intermediate Hurling Championship (1): 2016
- Leinster Under-21 Hurling Championship (1): 2017
- All-Ireland Minor Hurling Championship (1): 2014
- Leinster Minor Hurling Championship (2): 2013, 2014
