= Conor Delaney =

Conor Delaney may refer to:

- Conor Delaney (hurler), Irish hurler
- Conor P. Delaney, Irish-American colorectal surgeon
