= Darren Brennan =

Irish hurler (born 1996)

Personal information
- Native name: Darren Ó Braonáin (Irish)
- Born: 13 November 1996 (age 29) Freshford, County Kilkenny, Ireland
- Occupation: Student
- Height: 6 ft 2 in (188 cm)

Sport
- Sport: Hurling
- Position: Goalkeeper
Club
- Years: Club
- St Lachtain's
Club titles
- Kilkenny titles: 0
Inter-county*
Years	County	Apps (scores)
2017-present	Kilkenny	3 (0-01)
Inter-county titles
- Leinster titles: 0
- All-Irelands: 0
- NHL: 1
- All Stars: 0
- *Inter County team apps and scores correct as of 11:53, 11 July 2019.

Darren Brennan (born 13 November 1996) is an Irish hurler who plays for Kilkenny Intermediate Championship club St Lachtain's and at inter-county level with the Kilkenny senior hurling team. He usually lines out as a goalkeeper.

== Playing career ==
=== St Lachtain's ===
Brennan joined the St Lachtain's club at a young age and played in all grades at juvenile and underage levels. He experienced championship success in the under-21 grade before eventually joining the club's top adult team.

=== Kilkenny ===
==== Minor and under-21 ====
Brennan first played for Kilkenny as a member of the minor team during the 2013 Leinster Championship. He made his first appearance for the team on 4 May 2013 when he lined out in goal in Kilkenny's 7–16 to 1–09 defeat of Kildare. On 7 July 2013, Brennan won a Leinster Championship medal after again lining out in goal in Kilkenny's 1–18 to 0–08 defeat of Laois in the final.

Brennan was again eligible for the minor grade in 2014. He won a second successive Leinster Championship medal on 6 July 2014 following Kilkenny's 2–19 to 2–10 defeat of Dublin. On 7 September 2014, Brennan lined out in goal when Kilkenny faced Limerick in the All-Ireland final. He ended the game with a winners' medal following the 2–17 to 0–19 victory.

Brennan subsequently progressed onto the Kilkenny under-21 team during the 2015 Leinster Championship. He made his first appearance for the team on 2 June 2015 when he lined out in goal in Kilkenny's 4–12 to 2–16 defeat of Dublin in the quarter-final. On 8 July 2015, Brennan was again in goal when Kilkenny suffered a 4–17 to 1–09 defeat by Wexford in the Leinster final.

On 5 July 2017, Brennan won a Leinster Championship medal with the under-21 team after lining out in goal in Kilkenny's 0–30 to 1–15 defeat of Wexford in the final. On 9 September, he was again in goal for Kilkenny's 0–17 to 0–11 defeat by Limerick in the All-Ireland final. Brennan ended the season by being named on the Bord Gáis Energy Team of the Year.

==== Senior ====
Brennan was drafted onto the Kilkenny senior team at the start of the 2017 season. He remained as a non-playing substitute during the National League and Championship campaigns.

On 25 February 2018, Brennan made his first appearance for the Kilkenny senior team when he lined out in goal in a 2–22 to 2–21 defeat of Tipperary in the National League. On 8 April 2018, he was an unused substitute when Kilkenny defeated Tipperary by 2–23 to 2–17 to win the National League title. Brennan was selected on the bench when Kilkenny faced Galway in the Leinster final on 1 July 2018. He remained as an unused substitute for the 0-18 apiece draw. He remained on the bench for the replay a week later, which Kilkenny lost by 1–28 to 3–15.

On 11 May 2019, Brennan made his Leinster Championship debut in Kilkenny's 2–23 to 1–21 defeat of Dublin. On 30 June 2019, he was an unused substitute when Kilkenny suffered a 1–23 to 0–23 defeat by Wexford in the Leinster final.

== Career statistics ==
As of match played 30 June 2019.

Team	Year	National League			Leinster		All-Ireland		Total	
Team	Year	Division	Apps	Score	Apps	Score	Apps	Score	Apps	Score
Kilkenny	2017	Division 1A	0	0-00	0	0-00	0	0-00	0	0-00
Kilkenny	2018	Division 1A	3	0-00	0	0-00	0	0-00	3	0-00
Kilkenny	2019	Division 1A	0	0-00	3	0-01	0	0-00	3	0-01
Total			3	0-00	3	0-01	0	0-00	6	0-01

== Honours ==
St Lachtain's

- Kilkenny Under-21 A Hurling Championship (1): 2012

Kilkenny

- National Hurling League (1): 2018
- Leinster Under-21 Hurling Championship (1): 2017
- All-Ireland Minor Hurling Championship (1): 2014
- Leinster Minor Hurling Championship (2): 2013, 2014
