= Robbie Hanley =

Irish hurler (born 1996)

Personal information
- Native name: Riobeard Ó hÁinle (Irish)
- Born: 1996 (age 29–30) Kilmallock, County Limerick, Ireland
- Occupations: Marketing and advertising

Sport
- Sport: Hurling
- Position: Midfield
Club
- Years: Club
- Kilmallock
Club titles
- Limerick titles: 1
- Munster titles: 1
College
- Years: College
- Cork Institute of Technology
College titles
- Fitzgibbon titles: 0
Inter-county*
Years	County	Apps (scores)
2018–present	Limerick	2 (0–00)
Inter-county titles
- Munster titles: 2
- All-Irelands: 2
- NHL: 2
- All Stars: 0
- *Inter County team apps and scores correct as of 16:35, 21 July 2022.

Robbie Hanley (born 1996) is an Irish hurler who plays for Limerick Senior Championship club Kilmallock and at inter-county level with the Limerick senior hurling team. He usually lines out as a midfielder.

== Playing career ==
=== Kilmallock ===
Hanley joined the Kilmallock club at a young age and played in all grades at juvenile and underage levels before eventually joining the club's top adult team.

On 19 October 2014, Hanley won a Limerick Championship medal after coming on as a substitute in Kilmallock's 1–15 to 0–14 defeat of reigning champions Na Piarsaigh in the final. On 23 November, he was again introduced as a substitute as Kilmallock won the Munster Championship following a 1–32 to 3–18 extra-time defeat of Cratloe. On 17 March 2015, Hanley made another cameo appearance as a substitute for Kilmallock in their 1–18 to 1–06 defeat by Ballyhale Shamrocks in the All-Ireland final at Croke Park.

=== Limerick ===
==== Minor and under-21 ====
Hanley first played for Limerick as a member of the minor team during the 2014 Munster Championship. He made his first appearance on 10 April when he lined out at midfield in Limerick's 3–17 to 2–11 defeat of Tipperary. Hanley won a Munster Championship medal on 22 July after scoring a point from midfield in Limerick's 0–24 to 0–18 defeat of Waterford in the final replay. He was again at midfield for Limerick's subsequent 2–17 to 0–19 defeat by Kilkenny in the All-Ireland final on 7 September.

After progressing onto the Limerick under-21 team, Hanley made his first appearance for the team on 22 June 2017 when he lined out at midfield in a 2–24 to 0–19 defeat of Tipperary. He won a Munster Championship medal on 26 July following Limerick's 0–16 to 1–11 defeat of Cork in the final. On 9 September, Hanley was again at midfield in Limerick's 0–17 to 0–11 defeat of Kilkenny in the All-Ireland final. He was later named on the Bord Gáis Energy Team of the Year.

==== Senior ====
Hanley was added to the Limerick senior panel prior to the start of the 2019 season. He made his first appearance on 17 February 2019 when he scored a point from midfield in Limerick's 2–18 to 0–15 National League defeat of Kilkenny. On 31 March 2019, Hanley was named on the bench for Limerick's National League final meeting with Waterford at Croke Park. He collected a winners' medal as a non-playing substitute in the 1–24 to 0–19 victory.

== Career statistics ==
As of match played 15 May 2022.

Team	Year	National League			Munster		All-Ireland		Total	
Team	Year	Division	Apps	Score	Apps	Score	Apps	Score	Apps	Score
Limerick	2019	Division 1A	2	0–02	0	0–00	0	0–00	2	0–02
Limerick	2020	Division 1A	3	0–01	0	0–00	0	0–00	3	0–01
Limerick	2021	Division 1A	3	0–00	1	0–00	0	0–00	4	0–00
	2022	Division 1A	2	0–01	1	0–00	0	0–00	3	0–01
Career total			10	0–04	2	0–00	0	0–00	12	0–04

== Honours ==
Kilmallock

- Munster Senior Club Hurling Championship (2): 2014
- Limerick Senior Hurling Championship (3): 2014

Limerick

- All-Ireland Senior Hurling Championship (1): 2020
- Munster Senior Hurling Championship (3): 2019, 2020, 2021
- National Hurling League (2): 2019, 2020
- All-Ireland Under-21 Hurling Championship (1): 2017
- Munster Under-21 Hurling Championship (1): 2017
- Munster Minor Hurling Championship (1): 2014
