= Wild Geese Trophy =

Hurling competition

- Code: Hurling
- Founded: 2018
- No. of teams: 2
- Title holders: Galway (1st title)
- First winner: Galway
- Most titles: Galway (1 titles)
- Sponsors: Allianz
- TV partner(s): RTÉ (Highlights); Fox Sports (Live)

The Wild Geese Trophy is a hurling competition which was first played in 2018 at the Spotless Stadium in Sydney.

The 2018 contest was between 2018 Allianz Hurling League Division 1 Champions Kilkenny and 2017 All-Ireland Hurling Championship winners Galway, in what was the first ever full-format game of hurling to take place outside of Ireland.

== 2018 ==
Galway won the first ever Wild Geese trophy after overcoming Kilkenny following a free-taking competition after the game finished in a draw in the Spotless Stadium in Sydney. Galway had trailed by 14 points towards the end of the first half. Joe Canning was shown a straight red card for a high tackle on Enda Morrissey after 54 minutes.

11 November 2018
Final

Galway	4-23 - 3-26	Kilkenny
Cathal Mannion 1-4, Joe Canning 0-7 (5f, 1’65), Niall Burke 1-3 (3f), Davy Glennon 1-1, Joe Mooney 1-0, Aidan Harte 0-2, Brian Concannon 0-2, Conor Whelan 0-1, Shane Moloney 0-1, Johnny Coen 0-1, Fearghal Flannery 0-1	Report	Richie Hogan 0-11 (6f, 2 ’65), Ger Aylward 2-0, Walter Walsh 1-2, James Maher 0-3, Conor Fogarty 0-2, Richie Leahy 0-2, Martin Keoghan 0-1, Jason Cleere 0-1, Liam Blanchfield 0-1, John Donnelly 0-1, Luke Scanlon 0-1, Eoin Murphy 0-1 (f)
Penalties
Colm Callanan (penalty scored); Jason Flynn (penalty missed); Cathal Mannion (penalty scored); Shane Moloney (penalty scored); Niall Burke (penalty scored)	4–3	(penalty scored) Richie Hogan; (penalty scored) Eoin Murphy; (penalty scored) Conor Fogarty; (penalty missed) Jason Cleere; (penalty missed) Conor Martin

Sydney Showground Stadium
Referee: James Owens (Wexford)
- decided by free-taking contest
