= Jason Cleere =

Irish hurler (born 1996)

Personal information
- Native name: Íason de Cléir (Irish)
- Born: 1 August 1996 (age 30) Bennettsbridge, County Kilkenny, Ireland
- Occupation: Student
- Height: 6 ft 0 in (183 cm)

Sport
- Sport: Hurling
- Position: Left wing-back
Club
- Years: Club
- Bennettsbridge
Club titles
- Kilkenny titles: 0
College(s)
- Years: College
- Mary Immaculate College; Institute of Technology, Carlow
College titles
- Fitzgibbon titles: 0
Inter-county*
Years	County	Apps (scores)
2017–present	Kilkenny	0 (0-00)
Inter-county titles
- Leinster titles: 0
- All-Irelands: 0
- NHL: 0
- All Stars: 0
- *Inter County team apps and scores correct as of 21:54, 8 January 2020.

Jason Cleere (born 1 August 1996) is an Irish hurler who plays for Kilkenny Senior Championship club Bennettsbridge and at inter-county level with the Kilkenny senior hurling team. He usually lines out as a left wing-back.

== Playing career ==
=== St. Kieran's College ===
Cleere first came to prominence as a hurler with St. Kieran's College in Kilkenny. Having played in every grade as a hurler, he was eventually called up the college's senior team. On 5 April 2014, he lined out at right wing-back when St. Kieran's College defeated Kilkenny CBS to win the Dr. Croke Cup.

On 28 February 2015, Cleere won a Leinster Championship medal when he lined out at centre-back when St. Kieran's College defeated St. Peter's College by 1–14 to 1–06 in the final. He was again at centre-back when St. Kieran's faced Thurles CBS in the All-Ireland final and collected a second successive winners' medal following a 1–15 to 1–12 victory.

=== Bennettsbridge ===
Cleere joined the Bennettsbridge club at a young age and played in all grades at juvenile and underage levels before eventually joining the club's top adult team.

On 9 November 2014, Cleere won a Kilkenny Junior Championship medal following a 1–17 to 1–07 defeat of Mooncoin in the final. On 6 December, he won a Leinster Championship medal following Bennettsbridge's 1–20 to 0–03 defeat of Shamrocks in the final. Bennettsbridge subsequently qualified for an All-Ireland final meeting with Fullen Gaels on 15 February 2015. Cleere collected a winners' medal from right wing-back following a 2–17 to 2–14 victory.

On 18 October 2015, Cleere was at right wing-back when Bennettsbridge drew 0–20 to 3–11 with St Patrick's Ballyragget in the final of the Kilkenny Intermediate Championship. He lined out in the same position in the replay on 24 October and collected a winners' medal after a 1–16 to 1–14 victory. Cleere won a Leinster Championship medal on 21 November following a 1–14 to 0–13 defeat of Kiltale in the final. On 7 February 2016, he was selected at right wing-back for the All-Ireland final against Abbeyknockmoy. He ended the game with a winners' medal following a 1–17 to 1–14 victory.

On 28 October 2018, Cleere lined out at centre-back when Bennettsbridge faced Ballyhale Shamrocks in the final of the Kilkenny Senior Championship. He ended up on the losing side following a 2–20 to 2–17 victory for Ballyhale.

=== Kilkenny ===
==== Minor and under-21 ====
Cleere was selected for the Kilkenny minor team for the first time during the 2013 Leinster Championship. On 7 July he won a Leinster Championship medal as a non-playing substitute following Kilkenny's 1–18 to 0–08 defeat of Laois in the final.

On 26 April 2014, Cleere made his first appearance for the Kilkenny minor team when he lined out right wing-back in a 2–08 to 0–03 defeat by Dublin in the Leinster Championship. He was switched to centre-back for the Leinster final against Dublin on 6 July and collected a winners' medal following the 2–19 to 2–10 victory. On 7 September, Cleere won an All-Ireland medal at centre-back following Kilkenny's 2–17 to 0–19 defeat of Limerick in the final. It was his last game in the minor grade.

Cleere subsequently progressed onto the Kilkenny under-21 team during the 2015 Leinster Championship. He made his first appearance for the team on 2 June when he lined out at right wing-back in Kilkenny's 4–12 to 2–16 defeat of Dublin in the quarter-final. On 8 June, Cleere was again at right wing-back when Kilkenny suffered a 4–17 to 1–09 defeat by Wexford in the Leinster final.

On 5 July 2017, Cleere won a Leinster Championship medal with the under-21 team after scoring three points from centre-back in 0–30 to 1–15 defeat of Wexford in the final. On 9 September, he was again at centre-back for Kilkenny's 0–17 to 0–11 defeat by Limerick in the All-Ireland final.

==== Intermediate ====
Cleere earned a call up to the Kilkenny intermediate team for the 2016 Leinster Championship. He made his first appearance for the team on 13 July in Kilkenny's 3–14 to 2–14 defeat of Wexford in the Leinster final. On 6 August, Cleere was selected at right wing-back when Kilkenny faced Clare in the All-Ireland final. He ended the game with a winners' medal following a 5–16 to 1–16 victory.

==== Senior ====
Cleere was added to the Kilkenny senior team prior to the start of the 2017 National League. He made his first appearance on 5 March when he was selected at centre-back in Kilkenny's 0–22 to 0–15 defeat of Cork.

== Career statistics ==
As of match played 18 August 2019.

Team	Year	National League			Leinster		All-Ireland		Total	
Team	Year	Division	Apps	Score	Apps	Score	Apps	Score	Apps	Score
Kilkenny	2017	Division 1A	4	0-00	0	0-00	0	0-00	4	0-00
Kilkenny	2018	Division 1A	0	0-00	0	0-00	0	0-00	0	0-00
Kilkenny	2019	Division 1A	2	0-00	3	0-00	0	0-00	5	0-00
Career total			6	0-00	3	0-00	0	0-00	9	0-00

== Honours ==
St. Kieran's College

- All-Ireland Colleges Senior Hurling Championship (2): 2014, 2015
- Leinster Colleges Senior Hurling Championship (1): 2015

Bennettsbridge

- All-Ireland Intermediate Club Hurling Championship (1): 2016
- Leinster Intermediate Club Hurling Championship (1): 2015
- Kilkenny Intermediate Hurling Championship (1): 2015
- All-Ireland Junior Club Hurling Championship (1): 2015
- Leinster Junior Club Hurling Championship (1): 2014
- Kilkenny Junior Hurling Championship (1): 2014

Kilkenny

- All-Ireland Intermediate Hurling Championship (1): 2016
- Leinster Intermediate Hurling Championship (1): 2016
- Leinster Under-21 Hurling Championship (1): 2017
- All-Ireland Minor Hurling Championship (1): 2014
- Leinster Minor Hurling Championship (1): 2014
