= Zak Moradi =

Irish hurler

Semaco Moradi
Personal information
- Native name: Zachairí Moradi (Irish)
- Nickname: Zak
- Born: 16 January 1991 (age 35) Ramadi, Iraq
- Occupation: Pharmaceutical employee

Sport
- Sport: Hurling
- Position: Left corner-forward
Clubs
- Years: Club
- St. Mary's Kiltoghert; Thomas Davis
Club titles
- Dublin titles: 0
College
- Years: College
- Institute of Technology, Tallaght
Inter-county
- Years: County
- 2010-present: Leitrim
Inter-county titles
- All-Irelands: 1
- NHL: 0
- All Stars: 1

Semaco "Zak" Moradi (born 16 January 1991) is a Kurdish, Irish hurler who plays as a left corner-forward for the Leitrim senior team.

Born in Ramadi, Iraq, Moradi and his family relocated to Carrick-on-Shannon, Ireland in 2002. He first played competitive hurling at juvenile and underage levels with the St. Mary's Kiltoghert club. After moving to Dublin, Moradi joined the Thomas Davis club.

Moradi made his debut on the inter-county scene when he joined the Leitrim senior team in 2010. Since then he has become a regular member of the starting fifteen. In 2016 Moradi was included on the Lory Meagher Cup Champions 15.

In June 2019, Moradi was part of the Leitrim team that won the 2019 Lory Meagher Cup after a 2–23 to 2–22 win against Lancashire at Croke Park.

His memoir Life Begins in Leitrim, written with Niall Kelly, was published in 2022.

== Documentary ==
A documentary titled HOME: The Story of Zak Moradi (2024) follows Moradi's journey from a refugee camp in war‑torn Iraq to building a life in Ireland, and includes his emotional return to Kurdistan to explore the refugee experience. The film premiered at the Galway Film Fleadh on 12 July 2024 and was later included in RTÉ's summer 2025 documentary line‑up.

== Honours ==
- Dublin Intermediate Hurling Championship: Winner 2017
- Dublin Under 21 B Football Championship: Winner 2011
- Thomas Davis Hurler of the year 2016.
- Oldbawn Sports person of the year: Winner 2010

Leitrim
Lory Meagher Cup (1)
2019
