= 2017 All-Ireland Under-21 Hurling Championship final =

2017 All-Ireland Under-21 Hurling Championship Final
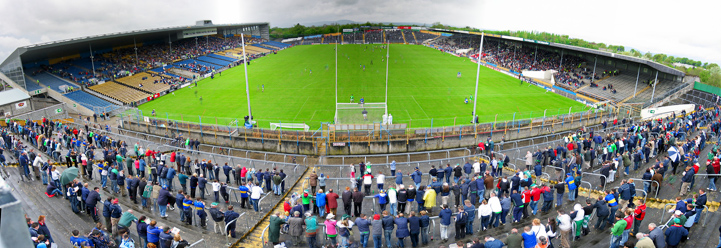
- Event: 2017 All-Ireland Under-21 Hurling Championship
| Kilkenny | Limerick |
| 0-11 | 0-17 |
- Date: 9 September 2017
- Venue: Semple Stadium, Thurles
- Man of the Match: Aaron Gillane
- Referee: Paud O'Dwyer (Carlow)
- Attendance: 15,485

The 2017 All-Ireland Under-21 Hurling Championship final was a hurling match that was played at Semple Stadium, Thurles on 9 September 2017 to determine the winners of the 2017 All-Ireland Under-21 Hurling Championship, the 55th season of the All-Ireland Under-21 Hurling Championship, a tournament organised by the Gaelic Athletic Association for the champion teams of the four provinces of Ireland. The final was contested by Kilkenny of Leinster and Limerick of Munster, with Limerick winning on a scoreline of 0-17 to 0-11.

The All-Ireland final between Kilkenny and Limerick was a unique occasion as it was the first ever championship meeting between the two teams. Kilkenny were appearing in their first final in five years, while Limerick were lining out in their second final in three seasons.

== Summary ==
Limerick failed to settle early on and Shane Walsh wasted little time in pointing Kilkenny into an early lead. Limerick found the pace of the game and a string of points from Aaron Gillane, Barry Nash, Ronan Lynch and Peter Casey gave the Munster champions a 0-7 to 0-1 lead after 16 minutes. The teams went point for point for a spell, however, Gillane and Ronan Lynch pointed to give Limerick an 0-11 to 0-4 half-time cushion.

Kilkenny struggled to cut into that seven-point advantage after the interval. Liam Blanchfield finally hit point number five for Kilkenny in the 43rd minute, but the response was immediate from Limerick when Casey pointed from the left. Alan Murphy took over the Kilkenny free-taking duties and fired three points for his side as Kilkenny closed the deficit to 0-14 to 0-8 with 11 minutes remaining. John Donnelly reduced the deficit to five points before a couple of quick points from placed balls from Murphy put Limerick under pressure. Gillane settled Limerick with a great score from the left before substitute Oisín O'Reilly clinched victory with a battling score after he was twice hooked in the build up.

Limerick's All-Ireland victory was their first since 2015. The win gave them their sixth All-Ireland title over all and cemented their place in fifth position on the all-time roll of honour. Limerick also retained their 100% record of never losing a final.

== Match ==
=== Details ===
9 September 2017
17:00

| Kilkenny | 0-11 - 0-17 | Limerick |
|---|---|---|
| A Murphy 0-5 (0-5f), S Walsh 0-3 (0-2f), J Donnelly, B Ryan and L Blanchfield 0-1 each. | Report | A Gillane 0-7 (0-2f), R Lynch (0-3f) and P Casey 0-3 each, C Lynch, B Nash, P Ahern and C Boylan 0-1 each. |

Semple Stadium, Thurles
Referee: P O'Dwyer (Carlow)

| Kilkenny | Limerick |
