= 2017 All-Ireland Under-21 Hurling Championship =

All-Ireland Under-21 Hurling Championship 2017
Championship Details
- Dates: 24 May 2017 – 9 September 2017
- Teams: 19

All Ireland Champions
- Winners: Limerick (6 win)
- Captain: Tom Morrissey
- Manager: Pat Donnelly

All Ireland Runners-up
- Runners-up: Kilkenny
- Captain: Pat Lyng
- Manager: Eddie Brennan

Provincial Champions
- Munster: Limerick
- Leinster: Kilkenny
- Ulster: Derry
- Connacht: Not Played

Championship Statistics
- Matches Played: 18
- Total Goals: 57 (3.16 per game)
- Total Points: 618 (34.33 per game)
- Top Scorer: Aaron Gillane (0-44)

The 2017 All-Ireland Under-21 Hurling Championship was the 54th staging of the All-Ireland Under-21 Hurling Championship since its establishment by the Gaelic Athletic Association in 1964. The championship began on 24 May 2017 and ended on 9 September 2017.

Waterford entered the championship as the defending champions, however, they were defeated by Cork in the Munster semi-final. Meath fielded a team in the championship for the first time in several seasons.

On 9 September 2017, Limerick won the championship following a 0-17 to 0-11 defeat of Kilkenny in the All-Ireland final. This was their fifth All-Ireland title overall and their first in two championship seasons.

== Provincial championships ==
=== Leinster Under-21 Hurling Championship ===
Preliminary round

24 May 2017 Preliminary round	Meath	0-12 - 2-20	Westmeath	St. Loman's Park, Trim
19:30	C Kearney (0-5 four frees), D Kelly (0-2 one free, one '65'), É Mac Donnchadh (0-2), R Ryan (0-1), M Cullen (0-1).	Report	K Doyle (0-12 six frees), C Doyle (1-3), M Daly (1-0), J Galvin (0-2); J Goonery (0-2), D Clinton (0-1).	Referee: J O'Brien (Laois)

Quarter-finals

31 May 2017 Quarter-final	Kildare	2-14 - 1-21	Carlow	St. Conleth's Park, Newbridge
19:30	J Sheridan (2-9, 1-7f), E O’Hehir (0-3f), S Lawlor (0-1), D Brereton (0-1).	Report	K McDonald (1-6, 1-5f); C Nolan (0-5, 1f), C Tracey (0-4), O Roberts (0-2); G Coady (0-1f), G Lawlor (0-1), J Murphy (0-1), A Amond (0-1).	Referee: G Quilty (Kilkenny)

31 May 2017 Quarter-final	Wexford	4-21 - 2-9	Offaly	Innovate Wexford Park, Wexford
19:30	C Dunbar 1-8 (1 sl), S O’Gorman 2-2, D Pepper 1-2, R White and J Coleman (0-2f) 0-3 each, R O'Connor 0-2, H O'Connor 0-1.	Report	C Freeman 0-5f, O Kelly and L Langton 1-1 each, C Kiely and C Cleary 0-1 each.	Referee: Peter Burke (Kilkenny)

31 May 2017 Quarter-final	Westmeath	1-20 - 0-21	Laois	TEG Cusack Park, Mullingar
19:30	K Doyle 0-10 (0-6f), C Doyle 1-3, J Goonery and D Clinton 0-2 each, S Clavin, M Daly, P Lynam 0-1 each.	Report	M Kavanagh 0-9 (0-6f, 1 '65), A Corby, B Corby, A Dunphy (0-2f) 0-3 each, S Downey, J Lennon, M Dowling 0-1 each.	Referee: K Brady (Louth)

31 May 2017 Quarter-final	Kilkenny	0-21 - 0-16	Dublin	Nowlan Park, Kilkenny
19:30	A Murphy 0-8 (0-7f), B Ryan 0-4, S Walsh and J Donnelly 0-2 each, T Walsh, S Morrissey, J Walsh, L Blanchfield, J Bergin 0-1 each.	Report	C Currie 0-9 (0-6f, 1 '65), R McBride 0-3, D Burke, E Conroy, F Whitely, C O'Sullivan 0-1 each.	Referee: P Murphy (Carlow); Man of the Match: Billy Ryan

Semi-finals

21 June 2017 Semi-final	Westmeath	1-11 - 1-21	Kilkenny	TEG Cusack Park, Mullingar
19:30	K Doyle 0-8 (0-6f), J Goonery 1-0, N Mitchell 0-3 (0-1 sideline).	Report	A Murphy 1-8 (0-8f), J Donnelly, S Morrissey 0-3 each, P Lyng, R Leahy 0-2 each, L Blanchfield, L Scanlon, E Kenny 0-1 each.	Referee: J Keenan (Wicklow)

21 June 2017 Semi-final	Wexford	3-16 - 1-12	Carlow	Innovate Wexford Park, Wexford
19:30	J Coleman 0-10 (0-7f), C Dunbar 3-0, D Pepper, R O’Connor 0-2 each, G Molloy, J O’Connor 0-1 each.	Report	C Nolan 0-8 (0-7f), C Foley 1-0, K McDonald 0-2, O Roberts, S Brennan 0-1 each.	Referee: J O'Brien (Laois)

Final

5 July 2017 Final	Kilkenny	0-30 - 1-15	Wexford	Nowlan Park, Kilkenny
19:30	R Leahy 0-5, A Murphy 0-5f (0-5f), L Scanlon 0-4, J Bergin 0-3 (0-3f), J Cleere 0-3, B Ryan, S Morrissey and J Donnelly 0-2 each, L Blanchfield, P Lyng, E Kenny and S Walsh 0-1 each.	Report	J Coleman 0-5 (0-5f), S O’Gorman 1-0, J Doyle 0-2 (0-1f), C Dunbar and R O’Connor 0-2 each, J O’Connor, C Moore and D Codd 0-1 each.	Attendance: 6,089; Referee: P Murphy (Carlow)

=== Munster Under-21 Hurling Championship ===
Quarter-final

22 June 2017 Quarter-final	Limerick	2-24 - 0-19	Tipperary	Gaelic Grounds, Limerick
19:30	A Gillane 0-9 (0-7f), T Morrissey 1-4, B Nash 1-0, P Casey 0-3, R Lynch, C Ryan, B Murphy 0-2 each, C Lynch, P Ahern 0-1 each.	Report	G Browne, L Fairbrother (0-4f) 0-5 each, M Kehoe 0-3, C Darcy 0-2 (0-2f), B McCarthy, W Connors, G O’Halloran and T Nolan 0-1 each.	Attendance: 3,076; Referee: C Lyons (Cork)

Semi-finals

12 July 2017 Semi-final	Limerick	1-28 - 1-15	Clare	Gaelic Grounds, Limerick
19:30	A Gillane 0-14 (5f, 1’65), C Ryan 0-3, P Casey 1-0, T Morriseey 0-2, B Nash 0-2, R Hanley 0-2, T Grimes 0-1, B Murphy 0-1, R Lynch 0-1 (1f), C Lynch 0-1, P Ahern 0-1.	Report	I Galvin 0-5 (4f), B Connors 1-0, C Corbett 0-2, D Fitzgerald 0-2, M O’Malley 0-1, A Shanagher 0-1, M O’Shea 0-1, R Hayes 0-1, B Cahill 0-1, P O’Loughlin 0-1.	Attendance: 5,577; Referee: C McAllister (Cork)

13 July 2017 Semi-final	Waterford	1-19 - 2-17	Cork	Walsh Park, Waterford
19:00	P Curran 0-10 (0-7f, 0-1 ’65) C Roche 0-5, S Bennett 1-1, C Curran 0-2, J Prendergast 0-1.	Report	D Dalton 1-12 (0-8f, 0-2 sideline), R O’Flynn 1-0, D Fitzgibbon 0-3, M O’Halloran, P Leopold 0-1 each.	Attendance: 4,127; Referee: F Horgan (Tipperary)

Final

26 July 2017 Final	Limerick	0-16 - 1-11	Cork	Gaelic Grounds, Limerick
19:30	A Gillane 0-6 (0-6f), B Nash, T Grimes, R Lynch (0-2f) and P Casey 0-2 each, M Mackey and T Morrissey 0-1 each.	Report	T O’Mahony 1-1, S Kingston 0-3, D Dalton, M Coleman (0-2f) and M O’Halloran 0-2 each, R O’Flynn 0-1.	Attendance: 11,774; Referee: R McGann (Clare)

=== Ulster Under-21 Hurling Championship ===
Semi-finals

19 July 2017 Semi-final	Derry	2-11 - 3-6	Antrim	Owenbeg
	C O'Doherty 2-5, B Cassidy 0-2, S Cassidy 0-1, C Reilly 0-1, D Cartin 0-1, C Steele 0-1.		J McNaughton 1-4, C McNaughton 1-1, É Smyth 1-0, C Carson 0-1.

19 July 2017 Semi-final	Armagh	1-15 - 8-19	Down	Athletic Grounds, Armagh
	D Gaffney 0-7, D Ryan 1-0, P McKearney 0-2, K Magee 0-1, D McKenna 0-1, B McAteer 0-1, D Grant 0-1, J O'Connor 0-1, M McEvoy 0-1.

Final

26 July 2017 Final	Derry	3-17 - 1-9	Down	Corrigan Park, Belfast
19:30	D Cartin (0-7, 5f), C Riley (2-0), B Cassidy (1-2), C McAllister (0-2), O McKeever (0-2); C O’Doherty (0-2), C Steele (0-1), S McGuigan (0-1).	Report	O McManus (1-0), C Coulter (0-3, 3f), M Fisher (0-2, 2f), B Trainor (0-1), D Sands, (0-1) R Campbell (0-1); P McCrickard (0-1).	Referee: C Cunning (Antrim)

== All-Ireland Under-21 Hurling Championship ==
=== All-Ireland Semi-Finals ===
19 August 2017 Semi-final	Kilkenny	8-35 - 0-7	Derry	Semple Stadium, Thurles
16:00	S Walsh 2-7 (0-4f), J Donnelly 1-7, L Blanchfield 0-6, B Ryan 2-0, E Kenny, R Leahy, L Scanlon 1-1 each, A Murphy 0-4 (0-1f), J Walsh 0-3, N McMahon, D Mullen, H Lawlor, S Morrissey, R Bergin 0-1 each.	Report	C O’Doherty 0-3, D Cartin (0-1f), C Steele, C Reilly, B Laverty 0-1 each.	Attendance: 6,524; Referee: J O'Brien (Laois); Man of the Match: Shane Walsh (Tullaroan)

19 August 2017 Semi-final	Galway	2-19 - 2-23	Limerick	Semple Stadium, Thurles
18:00	C Whelan 1-3 (0-1f), B Concannon, T Monaghan 0-4 each, J Coyne 1-1, D Nevin 0-2 (0-1f), J Grealish, S Loftus, K McHugo, S Linnane, E Niland (0-1f) 0-1 each.	Report	A Gillane 0-8 (0-4f, 0-2 ’65), B Murphy, P Casey 1-2 each, B Nash 0-4, T Grimes 0-2, K Hayes, R Hanley, C Lynch, A La Touche Cosgrave, C Boylan 0-1 each.	Attendance: 6,524; Referee: J Keenan (Wicklow)

=== All-Ireland final ===
9 September 2017 Final	Kilkenny	0-11 - 0-17	Limerick	Semple Stadium, Thurles
15:00	A Murphy 0-5 (0-5f), S Walsh 0-3 (0-2f), J Donnelly, B Ryan and L Blanchfield 0-1 each.	Report	A Gillane 0-7 (0-2f), R Lynch (0-3f) and P Casey 0-3 each, C Lynch, B Nash, P Ahern and C Boylan 0-1 each.	Attendance: 15,485; Referee: P O'Dwyer (Carlow)

== Statistics ==
=== Top scorers ===
Top scorers overall

Rank	Player	County	Tally	Total	Matches	Average
1	Aaron Gillane	Limerick	0-44	44	5	8.80
2	Alan Murphy	Kilkenny	1-30	33	5	6.60
3	Killian Doyle	Westmeath	0-30	30	3	10.00
4	Cathal Dunbar	Wexford	4-10	22	3	7.33
5	Shane Walsh	Kilkenny	2-13	19	5	3.80
6	John Donnelly	Kilkenny	1-15	18	5	3.60
7	Declan Dalton	Cork	1-14	17	2	8.50
7	Joe Coleman	Wexford	0-17	17	3	5.66
9	Cormac O'Doherty	Derry	2-10	16	3	5.33
9	Peter Casey	Limerick	2-10	16	5	3.20

Top scorers in a single game

Rank	Player	County	Tally	Total	Opposition
1	Jack Sheridan	Kildare	2-09	15	Carlow
2	Declan Dalton	Cork	1-12	15	Waterford
3	Aaron Gillane	Limerick	0-14	14	Clare
4	Shane Walsh	Kilkenny	2-07	13	Derry
5	Killian Doyle	Westmeath	0-12	12	Meath
6	Cormac O'Doherty	Derry	2-05	11	Offaly
6	Cathal Dunbar	Wexford	1-08	11	Offaly
6	Alan Murphy	Kilkenny	1-08	8	Westmeath
9	John Donnelly	Kilkenny	1-07	10	Derry
9	Patrick Curran	Waterford	0-10	10	Cork
9	Killian Doyle	Westmeath	0-10	10	Laois
9	Joe Coleman	Wexford	0-10	10	Carlow

=== Miscellaneous ===
- The All-Ireland final between Kilkenny and Limerick was the first ever championship meeting between the two teams.

== Awards ==
Team of the Year

1. Darren Brennan
2. Seán Finn
3. Conor Delaney
4. Seán Loftus
5. Ronan Lynch
6. Kyle Hayes
7. Jason Cleere
8. Colin Ryan
9. Robbie Hanley
10. Aaron Gillane
11. Declan Dalton
12. Cian Lynch
13. Conor Whelan
14. Peter Casey
15. Thomas Monaghan
