= 2018 National Hurling League =

87th season of the National Hurling League

National Hurling League 2018
League details
- Dates: 27 January – 8 April 2018
- Teams: 35

League champions
- Winners: Kilkenny (18th win)
- Captain: Cillian Buckley
- Manager: Brian Cody

League runners-up
- Runners-up: Tipperary
- Captain: Pádraic Maher
- Manager: Michael Ryan

Other division winners
- Division 1B: Limerick
- Division 2A: Carlow
- Division 2B: Mayo
- Division 3A: Warwickshire
- Division 3B: Lancashire

The 2018 National Hurling League was the 87th season of the National Hurling League for county teams.

Wexford finished top of Division 1B in 2017 and were promoted to Division 1A for 2018. Galway finished second in Division 1B in 2017 and so missed out on promotion, even though they subsequently won the Division 1 league final.

Cavan re-entered the National Hurling League in Division 3B, having previously withdrawn. Lancashire also entered in Division 3B for the first time.

Eir Sport and TG4 provided live TV coverage of the league on Saturday nights and Sunday afternoons respectively. Highlights programmes – RTÉ2 broadcast League Sunday on Sunday evenings, TG4 broadcast GAA 2018 on Monday evenings.

Kilkenny were the winners, defeating Tipperary in the final on 8 April by 2–23 to 2-17. It was an 18th League title for Kilkenny.

As National Hurling League champions Kilkenny played the 2017 All-Ireland champions Galway in Australia on 11 November 2018 for the Wild Geese Trophy as part of the Sydney Irish Festival.

== Format ==
League structure

Thirty five teams compete in the 2018 NHL – six teams in the top five divisions (Divisions 1A, 1B, 2A, 2B, 3A) and five teams in Division 3B. All thirty-two county teams from Ireland take part. London, Lancashire and Warwickshire complete the lineup.

Teams by Province and Division
Province	Div 1A	Div 1B	Div 2A	Div 2B	Div 3A	Div 3B	Total
Connacht	0	1	0	1	1	2	5
Leinster	2	3	4	1	2	0	12
Munster	4	1	1	0	0	0	6
Ulster	0	1	0	4	2	2	9
Britain	0	0	1	0	1	1	3
Total	6	6	6	6	6	5	35

Each team plays all the other teams in their division once, either home or away. Two points are awarded for a win, and one for a draw.

The Division 1 hurling quarter-finals and semi-finals will finish on the day the games are played avoiding the need for replays. If a quarter-final or semi-final is level after the initial seventy minutes, still level after two ten minute periods of extra time played each way, and still level after two further five minute periods of extra time, the outcome will be decided by a free-taking competition. This will prevent games from going to a replay and allow the league finals to be held on the scheduled date.

Tie-breaker

- If only two teams are level on league points, the team that won the head-to-head match is ranked ahead. If this game was a draw, score difference (total scored minus total conceded in all games) is used to rank the teams.
- If three or more teams are level on league points, score difference is used to rank the teams.

Finals, promotions and relegations

Division 1A

- The top four teams qualify for the Division 1 quarter-finals
- The bottom two teams meet in a relegation play-off, with the losing team relegated to Division 1B

Division 1B

- The top team is promoted to Division 1A
- The top four teams qualify for the Division 1 quarter-finals
- The bottom two teams meet in a play-off, with the losing team relegated to Division 2A

Division 2A

- The top two teams meet in Division 2A final, with the winning team promoted to Division 1B
- The bottom team is relegated to Division 2B

Division 2B

- The top two teams meet in Division 2B final, with the winning team being promoted to Division 2A
- The bottom two teams meet in a play-off, with the losing team relegated to Division 3A

Division 3A

- The top two teams meet in Division 3A final, with the winning team promoted to Division 2B

Division 3B

- The top two teams meet in Division 3B final, with the winner promoted to Division 3A

== Division 1A ==
=== Division 1 Format ===
The 12 teams in Division 1 are ranked into two groups - teams ranked one to six in Division 1A and teams ranked seven to twelve in Division 1B. Each team plays all the other teams in its group once. Two points are awarded for a win and one for a draw. The top four teams in both 1A and 1B advance to the league quarter-finals with the top team in 1A playing the fourth team in 1B, the second team in 1A playing the third in 1B, etc. Two semi-finals and a final follow.

=== Division 1A Table ===
NHL quarter-finals Relegated team

Team	Matches				Score			Pts
Team	Pld	W	D	L	For	Against	Diff	Pts
Tipperary	5	3	0	2	7-105	6-96	+12	6
Kilkenny	5	3	0	2	4-106	6-94	+6	6
Wexford	5	3	0	2	3-101	5-99	+6	6
Clare	5	3	0	2	5-95	2-99	+5	6
Waterford	5	2	0	3	4-85	6-95	–16	4
Cork	5	1	0	4	4-93	2-112	–13	2

=== Division 1A Rounds 1 to 5 ===
==== Division 1A Round 1 ====
27 January 2018; 19:00; Round 1	Cork	1-24 – 0-24	Kilkenny	Páirc Uí Chaoimh, Cork; Attendance: 16,189; Referee: F Horgan (Tipperary)
27 January 2018; 19:00; Round 1	C Lehane 0-11 (0-9 fs), S Kingston 1-1, S Harnedy 0-3, R O'Flynn 0-2, M Ellis, A Cadogan, C Spillane, L Meade, D Kearney, D Fitzgibbon, J O’Connor 0-1.	Report	A Murphy 0-5 (0-3 fs), R Reid 0-3, C Buckley 0-3, E Murphy 0-2 (both fs), TJ Reid 0-3 (0-3 fs), W Walsh 0-2, P Lyng, J Maher, M Keoghan, C Martin, P Walsh, C Fogarty 0-1.	Páirc Uí Chaoimh, Cork; Attendance: 16,189; Referee: F Horgan (Tipperary)

28 January 2018; 14:00; Round 1	Clare	1-21 – 0-19	Tipperary	Cusack Park, Ennis; Attendance: 6,277; Referee: A Kelly (Galway)
28 January 2018; 14:00; Round 1	D Reidy 1-7 (0-5f), P Duggan 0-4 (0-2f), C Malone 0-4, J Conlon and T Kelly 0-2 each, C Galvin 0-1.	Report	J Forde 0-10 (frees), N McGrath 0-5 (0-1f), Paraic Maher, C Barrett, R Maher and S Curran 0-1 each.	Cusack Park, Ennis; Attendance: 6,277; Referee: A Kelly (Galway)

28 January 2018; 14:00; Round 1	Waterford	0-19 – 2-20	Wexford	Walsh Park, Waterford; Attendance: 7,467; Referee: S Cleere (Kilkenny)
28 January 2018; 14:00; Round 1	P Mahony 0-12 (0-9f, 0-1 65’), J Barron 0-2 (0-1 s-l), T de Burca, A Gleeson, D Fives, J Dillon, T Ryan 0-1 each.	Report	D Dunne 2-2, L Chin 0-8 (0-6f), M Fanning 0-3 (0-3f), K Foley, D O’Keeffe 0-2 each, P Foley, A Nolan, P Morris 0-1 each.	Walsh Park, Waterford; Attendance: 7,467; Referee: S Cleere (Kilkenny)

==== Division 1A Round 2 ====
3 February 2018; 19:00; Round 2	Tipperary	1-20 – 1-11	Waterford	Semple Stadium, Thurles; Attendance: 6,363; Referee: C Lyons (Cork)
3 February 2018; 19:00; Round 2	J Forde 1-9 (0-6 fs, 1-0 pen, 0-1 65), R Maher 0-4 (0-1 lb), N McGrath (0-1 lb), S Curran 0-2 each, J McGrath, M Breen, B Maher 0-1.	Report	P Curran (0-3 fs), M Kearney 0-3 each, M O’Brien 1-0, TJ Foran, I Kenny, A Gleeson, B O’Halloran, J Barron 0-1.	Semple Stadium, Thurles; Attendance: 6,363; Referee: C Lyons (Cork)

4 February 2018; 14:00; Round 2	Kilkenny	1-18 – 2-18	Clare	Nowlan Park, Kilkenny; Attendance: 6,416; Referee: J McGrath (Westmeath)
4 February 2018; 14:00; Round 2	A Murphy 0-10 (8f, 2’65); B Sheehan 1-0; M Keoghan, W Walsh, E Murphy (2f) 0-2 each; P Lyng, R Leahy 0-1 each	Report	D Reidy 1-3; P Duggan 0-5 (3f, 1 sideline); S O’Donnell 1-0; J Conlon 0-3; C Malone 0-2; C Galvin, T Kelly, S Morey, D Fitzgerald, N Deasy 0-1 each.	Nowlan Park, Kilkenny; Attendance: 6,416; Referee: J McGrath (Westmeath)

4 February 2018; 14:00; Round 2	Wexford	0-21 – 1-14	Cork	Innovate Wexford Park, Wexford; Attendance: 8,000; Referee: J Keenan (Wicklow)
4 February 2018; 14:00; Round 2	L Chin 0-6 (2 fs, 1 ’65), K Foley, A Nolan, P Morris 0-3, J Guiney 0-2 (1 f), M Fanning, D O’Keeffe, C McDonald, H Kehoe 0-1.	Report	C Lehane 1-2 (0-1 f), P Horgan 0-4 (3 fs), A Cadogan 0-2, D Fitzgibbon, R O'Flynn, B Cooper, S Harnedy, S Kingston, M Cahalane 0-1 each.	Innovate Wexford Park, Wexford; Attendance: 8,000; Referee: J Keenan (Wicklow)

==== Division 1A Round 3 ====
17 February 2018; 19:00; Round 3	Tipperary	3-21 - 1-21	Wexford	Semple Stadium, Thurles; Attendance: 8,358; Referee: J McGrath (Westmeath)
17 February 2018; 19:00; Round 3	J Forde 2-9 (0-8f, 0-1 sideline), Patrick Maher 1-2, J McGrath 0-2, D Maher, B Heffernan, Padraic Maher, R Maher, S Curran, N McGrath, M Breen, B McCarthy 0-1 each.	Report	L Chin 0-10 (0-4f, 0-2 ’65), P Morris 0-3 (0-3f), A Nolan 1-0 (1-0 pen), J O’Connor, K Foley 0-2 each, S Murphy, C McDonald, D Dunne, R O’Connor 0-1 each.	Semple Stadium, Thurles; Attendance: 8,358; Referee: J McGrath (Westmeath)

18 February 2018; 14:00; Round 3	Clare	0-23 - 0-19	Cork	Cusack Park, Ennis; Attendance: 4,905; Referee: P O'Dwyer (Carlow)
18 February 2018; 14:00; Round 3	P Duggan 0-8 (6f, 2’65); D Reidy 0-3; J Conlon, S Morey, M O’Malley, T Kelly, C Galvin 0-2 each; P Collins, N Deasy 0-1 each.	Report	P Horgan 0-12 (9f, 2’65); L Meade, T O’Mahony, R O’Flynn, M Ellis, D Browne, B Cooper, S Harnedy 0-1 each.	Cusack Park, Ennis; Attendance: 4,905; Referee: P O'Dwyer (Carlow)

18 February 2018; 14:00; Round 3	Waterford	1-12 - 1-20	Kilkenny	Walsh Park, Waterford; Attendance: 5,859; Referee: F Horgan (Tipperary)
18 February 2018; 14:00; Round 3	Pauric Mahony (0-7, 6f, 1’65’), T Ryan (1-0), P Curran (0-1), C Dunford (0-1), T de Burca (0-1), T Devine (0-1); A Gleeson (0-1).	Report	TJ Reid (1-11, 9f, 1’65’), M Keoghan (0-5), J Donnelly (0-2), J Maher (0-1), L Scanlon (0-1).	Walsh Park, Waterford; Attendance: 5,859; Referee: F Horgan (Tipperary)

==== Division 1A Round 4 ====
25 February 2018; 14:00; Round 4	Kilkenny	2-22 - 2-21	Tipperary	Nowlan Park, Kilkenny; Attendance: 10,587; Referee: A Kelly (Galway)
25 February 2018; 14:00; Round 4	TJ Reid (1 pen, 7 frees, 2 65s)(0-13); W Walsh, L Scanlon (1-0 each); R Leahy (0-3); J Maher, L Blanchfield, P Lyng, C Browne, R Reid, A Murphy (0-1 each).	Report	M Breen (6 frees)(2-9); B Maher (0-4); N O’Meara (0-3); C Darcy, S Curran, B McCarthy, M Russell, R Maher (sideline)(0-1 each).	Nowlan Park, Kilkenny; Attendance: 10,587; Referee: A Kelly (Galway)

25 February 2018; 14:00; Round 4	Wexford	0-20 - 1-13	Clare	Innovate Wexford Park, Wexford; Attendance: 7,800; Referee: C Lyons (Cork)
25 February 2018; 14:00; Round 4	R O’Connor (0-4); L Chin (0-4, 3f and 1 ‘65’); M Fanning (0-3f); P Foley, C McDonald and K Foley (all 0-2); J O’Connor, C Dunbar (both 0-1); P Morris (0-1f).	Report	P Duggan (1-7, 1-6f and 0-1 ‘65’); J Conlon (0-4); D McInerney and S O’Donnell (both 0-1).	Innovate Wexford Park, Wexford; Attendance: 7,800; Referee: C Lyons (Cork)

25 February 2018; 15:00; Round 4	Cork	1-15 - 1-20	Waterford	Páirc Uí Chaoimh, Cork; Attendance: 10,445; Referee: S Cleere (Kilkenny)
25 February 2018; 15:00; Round 4	P Horgan (1-10, 0-9 frees); C Lehane (0-2); T O’Mahony, M Ellis, C Spillane (0-1 each).	Report	Pauric Mahony (0-10, 8 frees); M Kearney (1-1); A Gleeson (0-3, 1 free); S Bennett (0-2); C Dunford, J Barron, T de Burca, S Roche (0-1 each).	Páirc Uí Chaoimh, Cork; Attendance: 10,445; Referee: S Cleere (Kilkenny)

==== Division 1A Round 5 ====
11 March 2018; 14:30; Round 5	Kilkenny	0-22 - 0-19	Wexford	Nowlan Park, Kilkenny; Attendance: 9,793; Referee: J McGrath (Westmeath)
11 March 2018; 14:30; Round 5	TJ Reid (0-12, 0-9f, 0-1 ‘65’), R Leahy (0-3), J Maher (0-2), W Walsh (0-2), C Buckley (0-1), J Donnelly (0-1), G Aylward (0-1).	Report	R O’Connor (0-7, 4f, 1’65’)), P Foley (0-5, 4f), K Foley (0-3), C Dunbar (0-2), D O’Keeffe (0-1), C McDonald (0-1).	Nowlan Park, Kilkenny; Attendance: 9,793; Referee: J McGrath (Westmeath)

11 March 2018; 14:30; Round 5	Tipperary	1-24 - 1-21	Cork	Semple Stadium, Thurles; Attendance: 6,673; Referee: P O'Dwyer (Carlow)
11 March 2018; 14:30; Round 5	J Forde (7 frees)(0-12); Patrick Maher (0-3); B McCarthy (1-1); M Breen, S Curran, C Barrett (0-2 each); A Flynn, B Maher (0-1 each).	Report	P Horgan (1-0 pen, 8 frees)(1-10); A Cadogan (0-3); C Lehane, M Cahalane, L Meade (0-2 each); S Kingston, D Kearney (0-1 each).	Semple Stadium, Thurles; Attendance: 6,673; Referee: P O'Dwyer (Carlow)

11 March 2018; 14:30; Round 5	Waterford	1-23 - 1-20	Clare	Walsh Park, Waterford; Attendance: 2,656; Referee: J Murphy (Limerick)
11 March 2018; 14:30; Round 5	P Curran 1-13 (9fs), M Kearney 0-4, S Bennett 0-2, K Bennett, C Gleeson, A Gleeson, K Moran 0-1 each.	Report	P Duggan 0-5 (4fs), C McGrath 1-1, T Kelly 0-4, D Reidy 0-3, I Galvin, J Conlon 0-2 each, S Morey, C Malone, S O’Donnell 0-1 each.	Walsh Park, Waterford; Attendance: 2,656; Referee: J Murphy (Limerick)

== Division 1B ==
=== Division 1B Table ===
Promotion & NHL quarter-finals NHL quarter-finals Relegated team

Team	Matches				Score			Pts
Team	Pld	W	D	L	For	Against	Diff	Pts
Limerick	5	5	0	0	8-114	1-77	+58	10
Galway	5	4	0	1	7-95	4-79	+26	8
Offaly	5	2	0	3	5-88	7-95	–13	4
Dublin	5	2	0	3	5-92	4-110	–15	4
Laois	5	1	0	4	1-95	9-103	–32	2
Antrim	5	1	0	4	5-88	6-108	–23	2

=== Division 1B Rounds 1 to 5 ===
==== Division 1B Round 1 ====
27 January 2018; 17:00; Round 1	Dublin	1-15 – 2-25	Offaly	Croke Park, Dublin; Attendance: 26,027; Referee: P O'Dwyer (Carlow)
27 January 2018; 17:00; Round 1	D Burke 0-6 (0-5f), P Winters 1-1, A Moore 0-2, C Crummey, F Whitely, N McMorrow, J Hetherton, R Smith and É Dillon 0-1 each.	Report	S Dooley 1-5 (1-0 pen, 0-5f), J Bergin 0-6 (0-3f, 0-1 65), S Kinsella 0-3, O Kelly (0-1 sideline) and C Egan 0-3 each, L Langton 1-0, D Currams and D Egan 0-2 each and D Shortt 0-1.	Croke Park, Dublin; Attendance: 26,027; Referee: P O'Dwyer (Carlow)

28 January 2018; 13:00; Round 1	Galway	1-19 – 1-16	Antrim	Pearse Stadium, Galway; Attendance: 3,977; Referee: J O'Brien (Laois)
28 January 2018; 13:00; Round 1	C Cooney 0-6 (0-4f, 0-1 ‘65) B Concannon 1-1, J Cooney 0-3, É Burke 0-3, N Burke 0-1, P Flaherty 0-1, M Dolphin 0-1, J Hanbury 0-1, D Glennon 0-1, C Mannion 0-1	Report	N McManus 0-10 (0-7f, 0-1 ‘65,) N Elliot 0-3, C McCann 1-0, C Johnston 0-1, G Walsh, D Kearney 0-1.	Pearse Stadium, Galway; Attendance: 3,977; Referee: J O'Brien (Laois)

28 January 2018; 14:00; Round 1	Limerick	1-25 – 0-18	Laois	Gaelic Grounds, Limerick; Attendance: 1,450; Referee: C Canning (Antrim)
28 January 2018; 14:00; Round 1	A Gillane 0-11 (6f, 2 65), G Hegarty 1-0, P Browne, T Morrissey and D Reidy 0-3 each, C Lynch and D Byrnes 0-2 each, B O’Connell 0-1.	Report	R King 0-11 (6f, 2 ‘65), E Rowland (2f) and P Purcell 0-2 each, B Conroy, W Dunphy and A Corby 0-1 each.	Gaelic Grounds, Limerick; Attendance: 1,450; Referee: C Canning (Antrim)

==== Division 1B Round 2 ====
3 February 2018; 19:00; Round 2	Laois	0-17 – 2-18	Galway	O'Moore Park, Portlaoise; Attendance: 5,387; Referee: J Owens (Wexford)
3 February 2018; 19:00; Round 2	R King 0-12 (7f, 1'65), W Dunphy 0-2, E Killeen, M Kavanagh, E Rowland (1f) 0-1 each		C Whelan 2-0, PMannion (3f), J Cooney 0-4 each, C Cooney (2f), A Harte 0-3 each, S Linnane, J Coen, P Brehony, D Glennon 0-1 each	O'Moore Park, Portlaoise; Attendance: 5,387; Referee: J Owens (Wexford)

4 February 2018; 14:00; Round 2	Offaly	0-10 – 1-24	Limerick	Bord na Móna O'Connor Park, Tullamore; Attendance: 4,640; Referee: S Cleere (Kilkenny)
4 February 2018; 14:00; Round 2	D Egan 0-6 (4f), T Geraghty, C Gath, S Kinsella, D Currams 0-1 each.	Report	A Gillane 1-8 (6f), G Hegarty, D O’Donovan (1f), P Browne 0-3 each, D Byrnes, 0-2, O O’Reilly, D Reidy, T Morrissey, C Lynch, S Flanagan 0-1 each.	Bord na Móna O'Connor Park, Tullamore; Attendance: 4,640; Referee: S Cleere (Kilkenny)

4 February 2018; 14:00; Round 2	Antrim	0-22 – 0-23	Dublin	Corrigan Park, Belfast; Referee: J Heffernan (Wexford)
4 February 2018; 14:00; Round 2	N McManus 0-16 (11f, 2 '65s'), A Graffin, J McNaughton 0-2 each, G Walsh, D McCloskey 0-1 each.	Report	P Ryan 0-8 (6f, 1 '65'), D Burke 0-7 (4f), F Whitely, C Keaney, C McBride 0-2 each, J Madden, D Sutcliffe 0-1 each.	Corrigan Park, Belfast; Referee: J Heffernan (Wexford)

==== Division 1B Round 3 ====
17 February 2018; 19:00; Round 3	Limerick	1-26 - 0-17	Dublin	Gaelic Grounds, Limerick; Attendance: 2,604; Referee: J Ryan (Tipperary)
17 February 2018; 19:00; Round 3	A Gillane 1-8 (1-0 pen, six frees), S Flanagan (0-4), D Reidy (0-4, one free); D Byrnes (0-3, one free), T Morrissey (0-3), G Hegarty (0-2), P Ryan (0-1), B O’Connell (0-1).	Report	D Burke (0-5 all frees), D Sutcliffe (0-4); C Keaney (0-3), E O’Donnell (0-1); C McBride (0-1), F McGibb (0-1), F Whitely (0-1), C Boland (0-1).	Gaelic Grounds, Limerick; Attendance: 2,604; Referee: J Ryan (Tipperary)

17 February 2018; 19:00; Round 3	Laois	0-27 - 2-16	Antrim	O'Moore Park, Portlaoise; Attendance: 1,100; Referee: J Murphy (Limerick)
17 February 2018; 19:00; Round 3	R King 0-15 (13f, 65), E Rowland (fs), C Dwyer, J Ryan, N Foyle 0-2 each, M Kavanagh, P Purcell, C Comerford, S Downey 0-1 each.	Report	N McManus 0-11 (9f), E Campbell, N Elliott 1-1 each, C Johnston, N McAuley, M Connolly 0-1 each.	O'Moore Park, Portlaoise; Attendance: 1,100; Referee: J Murphy (Limerick)

18 February 2018; 14:00; Round 3	Galway	2-19 - 0-14	Offaly	Pearse Stadium, Galway; Attendance: 5,355; Referee: C McAllister (Cork)
18 February 2018; 14:00; Round 3	J Cooney 2-1, C Cooney 0-7 (0-4f), C Mannion 0-5, S Loftus 0-3, P Flaherty 0-2, N Burke 0-1.	Report	D Egan 0-3 (0-3f), D Currams 0-3, T Geraghty 0-3, S Kinsella 0-2, S Dooley 0-2 (0-2f), D King 0-1.	Pearse Stadium, Galway; Attendance: 5,355; Referee: C McAllister (Cork)

==== Division 1B Round 4 ====
25 February 2018; 13:00; Round 4	Offaly	1-21 - 1-16	Laois	Bord na Móna O'Connor Park, Tullamore; Referee: J Heffernan (Wexford)
25 February 2018; 13:00; Round 4	S Dooley (0-10, 6 frees, 1 ’65), J Bergin (1-4), T Geraghty (0-2), D King (0-1); D O’Toole (0-1), P Delaney (0-1); C Kiely (0-1), D Currams (0-1).	Report	P Purcell (1-3), R King (0-5, 4 frees), M Kavanagh (0-2, 1 sideline), W Dunphy (0-2); E Rowland (0-1 free); P Lawlor (0-1), C Dwyer (0-1), N Foyle (0-1).	Bord na Móna O'Connor Park, Tullamore; Referee: J Heffernan (Wexford)

25 February 2018; 14:00; Round 4	Dublin	1-14 - 1-20	Galway	Parnell Park, Dublin; Attendance: 3,500; Referee: J Keenan (Wicklow)
25 February 2018; 14:00; Round 4	P Winters 0-9 (0-8f, 0-01 65), D Sutcliffe 1-1, F MacGib, T Connolly, R Hayes and C Boland 0-1 each.	Report	J Flynn 1-9 (0-6f), C Mannion 0-4, S Loftus, P Mannion and N Burke 0-2 each, B Concannon 0-1.	Parnell Park, Dublin; Attendance: 3,500; Referee: J Keenan (Wicklow)

25 February 2018; 14:00; Round 4	Antrim	0-13 - 3-21	Limerick	Páirc Mhuire, Cushendall; Referee: J O'Brien (Tipperary)
25 February 2018; 14:00; Round 4	N McManus 0-8 (7frees), N Elliott 0-2, M Armstrong, C McCann and E Campbell 0-1 each.	Report	A Gillane 1-5 (0-3frees), G Mulcahy 1-2, D Byrnes (3frees) and D Reidy (1free) 0-4 each, O O’Reilly 1-0, C Ryan 0-3, B O’Connell 0-2, P Browne 0-1.	Páirc Mhuire, Cushendall; Referee: J O'Brien (Tipperary)

==== Division 1B Round 5 ====
11 March 2018; 14:30; Round 5	Galway	1-19 - 2-18	Limerick	Pearse Stadium, Galway; Attendance: 9,728; Referee: C McAllister (Cork)
11 March 2018; 14:30; Round 5	J Flynn 0-7 (0-6f), C Mannion 1-4, C Cooney 0-2, G Lally 0-2 (0-1 sideline), J Coen 0-2, J Canning 0-1 (0-1 ’65), D Burke 0-1.	Report	A Gillane 1-7 (1-0 pen, 0-6f, 0-1 sideline), S Flanagan 0-5, K Hayes 1-0, D Reidy 0-2, G Hegarty 0-1, G Mulcahy 0-1, C Lynch 0-1, P Ryan 0-1.	Pearse Stadium, Galway; Attendance: 9,728; Referee: C McAllister (Cork)

11 March 2018; 14:30; Round 5	Offaly	2-18 - 2-21	Antrim	St. Brendan's Park, Birr; Attendance: 2,000; Referee: J Ryan (Tipperary)
11 March 2018; 14:30; Round 5	S Dooley 1-6 (0-6f), J Bergin 0-5 (0-2f, 0-1 ’65), P Geraghty 1-1, C Kiely 0-2 (0-1f), J Gorman, L Langton, D King and D Shortt 0-1 each.	Report	N McManus 0-7 (0-4f), D McCloskey & N Elliot 1-0 each, E Campbell, J Maskey, C McCann, C Johnston & J McNaughton 0-2 each, D McKinley, M Armstrong, C McKinley & R McCambridge 0-1 each.	St. Brendan's Park, Birr; Attendance: 2,000; Referee: J Ryan (Tipperary)

11 March 2018; 14:30; Round 5	Laois	0-17 - 3-23	Dublin	O'Moore Park, Portlaoise; Referee: P Murphy (Carlow)
11 March 2018; 14:30; Round 5	PJ Scully 0-6 (4f), C Dwyer, R King (2f) 0-3 each, N Foyle 0-2, E Rowland (f), B Conroy, P Purcell 0-1 each.	Report	D Burke 0-11 (6f, 1 '65'), R Hayes 2-4, R O'Dwyer 1-1, F Mac Gib 0-2, C Keaney, D Sutcliffe, J McCaffrey, P Ryan, C McBride 0-1 each.	O'Moore Park, Portlaoise; Referee: P Murphy (Carlow)

== Division 1 Knockout ==
=== Division 1 Quarter-Finals ===
The hurling quarter-finals finish on the day the games are played, avoiding the need for replays. If the score is level after the initial seventy minutes, still level after two ten minute periods of extra time played each way, and still level after a further two five minute periods of extra time, a free-taking competition is held. Each team nominates five players to take frees from their chosen position on a sixty five metre line selected by the referee and without defenders. The nominated players from each team take alternate turns. If the teams score an equal number of the five frees, the outcome of the match is decided by sudden death frees using the same nominated players in the same order.

The fixtures are 1st in Division 1A plays 4th in Division 1B, 2nd in Division 1A plays 3rd in Division 1B, etc. Home advantage is decided by whichever team has played fewer home games in their five league games, with a coin toss taking place if this number is the same for both teams.

19 March 2018; 1:30 pm Quarter-final	Offaly	1-19 - 0-24	Kilkenny	O'Connor Park, Tullamore; Attendance: 3,522; Referee: P O’Dwyer (Carlow).
19 March 2018; 1:30 pm Quarter-final	S Dooley 0-8 (5fs), C Mahon 1-2, J Bergin, S Kinsella and C Egan 0-2 each, D Currams, C Kiely and D King 0-1 each.		TJ Reid 0-12 (9fs), W Walsh 0-4, L Blanchfield 0-3, J Maher & J Donnelly 0-2, G Aylward 0-1.	O'Connor Park, Tullamore; Attendance: 3,522; Referee: P O’Dwyer (Carlow).

19 March 2018; 4:00 pm Quarter-final	Limerick	4-21 – 0-33 (aet); Free-taking shoot-out 7-6	Clare	Gaelic Grounds, Limerick; Referee: A Kelly (Galway)
19 March 2018; 4:00 pm Quarter-final	A Gillane 2-11 (0-11f), D Byrnes 1-1 (1-1f), P Ryan 1-0, C Ryan 0-3 (0-1 sideline cut), G Hegarty 0-2, C Lynch, T Morrissey, P Browne, S Flanagan 0-1 each.	Report	P Duggan 0-19 (0-15f, 0-2 ‘65), T Kelly 0-6, D Reidy and J Conlon 0-2 each, C McGrath, D Fitzgerald, S O’Donnell, C Galvin 0-1 each.	Gaelic Grounds, Limerick; Referee: A Kelly (Galway)

24 March 2018; 15:00; Quarter-final	Wexford	1-23 - 0-23	Galway	Wexford Park, Wexford; Attendance: 7,200; Referee: F Horgan (Tipperary)
24 March 2018; 15:00; Quarter-final	R O’Connor (4 frees)(0-6); P Foley (3 frees)(0-5); C McDonald (1-1); D O’Keeffe (0-3); L Chin (1 free), H Kehoe, K Foley (0-2 each); J O’Connor, L Ryan (0-1 each).	Report	J Canning (1 65, frees)(0-10); C Whelan (0-5); C Mannion, J Coen (0-3 each); J Flynn, J Cooney, (0-1 each).	Wexford Park, Wexford; Attendance: 7,200; Referee: F Horgan (Tipperary)

25 March 2018; 13:00; Quarter-final	Dublin	0-20 - 2-25	Tipperary	Croke Park, Dublin; Attendance: 22,085; Referee: S Cleere (Kilkenny)
25 March 2018; 13:00; Quarter-final	D Sutcliffe 0-6 (0-2frees); D Burke 0-4 (0-3 frees); P Winters 0-3; C Keaney 0-3; F McGibb 0-2; S Barrett 0-1; F Ó Rianin Broin 0-1 free.	Report	J Forde 0-9 (0-7f) J McGrath 1-4; M Breen 1-0; R Maher 0-2, S Curran 0-2, J O’Dwyer 0-2; C Darcy 0-2; S Kennedy, B Heffernan, A Flynn and P Maher 0-1 each.	Croke Park, Dublin; Attendance: 22,085; Referee: S Cleere (Kilkenny)

=== Division 1 Semi-Finals ===
The hurling semi-finals finish on the day the games are played, avoiding the need for replays. If the score is level after the initial seventy minutes, still level after two ten minute periods of extra time played each way, and still level after a further two five minute periods of extra time, a free-taking competition is held. Each team nominates five players to take frees from their chosen position on a sixty five metre line selected by the referee and without defenders. The nominated players from each team take alternate turns. If the teams score an equal number of the five frees, the outcome of the match is decided by sudden death frees using the same nominated players in the same order.

31 March 2018; 7:00 pm Semi-final	Tipperary	2-31 - 1-31 (aet)	Limerick	Semple Stadium, Thurles; Attendance: 12,006; Referee: John Keenan (Wicklow)
31 March 2018; 7:00 pm Semi-final	J Forde 2-11 (8f), R Maher 0-5 (2 sidelines), M Breen 0-3, J McGrath 0-5, S Curran 0-3, J O’Dwyer 0-1, W Connors 0-1, B Heffernan 0-1, B McCarthy 0-1.	Report	A Gillane 0-7 (4f, 2 ’65), T Morrissey 0-6 (5f), G Mulcahy 1-1, G Hegarty 0-3 (1 sideline), K Hayes 0-3, S Flanagan 0-3, C Lynch 0-2, P Ryan 0-1, P Browne 0-1, D Byrnes 0-1, B Murphy 0-1, B Nash 0-1, D Reidy 0-1	Semple Stadium, Thurles; Attendance: 12,006; Referee: John Keenan (Wicklow)

1 April 2018; 2:00 pm Semi-final	Wexford	2-15 - 1-27	Kilkenny	Wexford Park, Wexford; Attendance: 16,542; Referee: Colm Lyons (Cork)
1 April 2018; 2:00 pm Semi-final	R O’Connor 0-12 (8f), C McDonald 1-1, A Nolan 1-0 (penalty), S Murphy, H Kehoe 0-1 each.	Report	TJ Reid 0-15 (11f), W Walsh 1-1, R Leahy, J Donnelly, G Aylward 0-2 each, E Murphy (1f), C Buckley, E Morrissey, M Keoghan, B Sheehan 0-1 each.	Wexford Park, Wexford; Attendance: 16,542; Referee: Colm Lyons (Cork)

=== Division 1 Final ===
8 April 2018; 3:30 pm Final	Tipperary	2-17 - 2-23	Kilkenny	Nowlan Park, Kilkenny; Attendance: 17,608; Referee: A Kelly (Galway)
8 April 2018; 3:30 pm Final	J Forde 2-12, J McGrath 0-2, W Connors, S Curran, S Kennedy 0-1 each	Report	TJ Reid 0-15, W Walsh 1-2, C Fogarty 1-0, J Donnelly 0-2, L Blanchfield, E Murphy, J Maher, M Keoghan 0-1 each	Nowlan Park, Kilkenny; Attendance: 17,608; Referee: A Kelly (Galway)

=== Division 1A relegation play-off ===
The losing team is relegated and plays in next year's Division 1B.

18 March 2018; 15:00; Play-off	Cork	0-21 - 1-13	Waterford	Páirc Uí Rinn, Cork; Referee: J Keenan (Wicklow)
18 March 2018; 15:00; Play-off	P Horgan 0-5 (0-3f), B Cooper 0-4, D Fitzgibbon, D Brosnan 0-3 each, D Kearney 0-2, C Lehane, M Cahalane, C Spillane, A Cadogan 0-1 each.	Report	P Mahony 0-4 (0-2f), S Bennett 0-3, P Curran 1-0 (1-0 pen), T Ryan 0-2, T de Búrca, J Barron, J Dillon, M Kearney 0-1 each.	Páirc Uí Rinn, Cork; Referee: J Keenan (Wicklow)

=== Division 1B relegation play-off ===
The losing team is relegated and plays in next year's Division 2A.

18 March 2018; 14:00; Play-off	Antrim	0-17 - 1-16	Laois	Pearse Park, Dunloy; Referee: P Murphy (Carlow)
18 March 2018; 14:00; Play-off	N McManus 0-10 (5fs, 2 65’s, 1 pen), C Johnston 0-2, N Elliott 0-1, M Armstrong 0-1, E Campbell 0-1, P Burke 0-1, J McNaughton 0-1	Report	R King 0-12 (9fs), P Purcell 1-1, C Dwyer 0-1, B Conroy 0-1, J Ryan 0-1	Pearse Park, Dunloy; Referee: P Murphy (Carlow)

=== Division 1 scoring statistics ===
Top scorers overall

Rank	Player	Team	Tally	Total	Matches	Average
1	Jason Forde	Tipperary	7-72	93	7	13.28
3	T. J. Reid	Kilkenny	1-81	84	7	12.00
2	Aaron Gillane	Limerick	5-57	72	7	10.28
4	Neil McManus	Antrim	0-62	62	6	10.33
5	Ross King	Laois	0-58	58	6	9.66
6	Patrick Horgan	Cork	2-46	52	6	8.66
7	Peter Duggan	Clare	1-48	51	6	8.50
8	Shane Dooley	Offaly	2-31	37	6	6.16
8	Pauric Mahony	Waterford	0-37	37	6	6.16
9	Donal Burke	Dublin	0-34	34	6	5.66

Top scorers in a single game

Rank	Player	Club	Tally	Total	Opposition
1	Peter Duggan	Clare	0-19	19	Limerick
2	Jason Forde	Tipperary	2-12	18	Kilkenny
3	Jason Forde	Tipperary	2-11	17	Limerick
4	Patrick Curran	Waterford	1-13	16	Clare
5	Neil McManus	Antrim	0-16	16	Dublin
6	Michael Breen	Tipperary	2-09	15	Kilkenny
6	Jason Forde	Tipperary	2-09	15	Wexford
6	T. J. Reid	Kilkenny	0-15	15	Wexford
6	Ross King	Laois	0-15	15	Antrim
6	T. J. Reid	Kilkenny	0-15	15	Tipperary

== Division 2A ==
=== Division 2A Table ===
Division champions, promoted Relegated team

Team	Matches				Score			Pts
Team	Pld	W	D	L	For	Against	Diff	Pts
Westmeath	5	5	0	0	5-90	4-70	+23	10
Carlow	5	4	0	1	7-91	3-64	+39	8
Kerry	5	3	0	2	7-99	4-70	+38	6
Meath	5	2	0	3	5-80	5-88	-8	4
London	5	1	0	4	4-71	8-104	–45	2
Kildare	5	0	0	5	3-57	7-103	–58	0

=== Division 2A Rounds 1 to 5 ===
==== Division 2A Round 1 ====
28 January 2018; Round 1	London	1-13 – 2-30	Kerry	McGovern Park, Ruislip; Referee: P Burke (Kilkenny)
28 January 2018; Round 1	R Murphy 0-5 (4f), M Duggan 1-1, A O'Leary 0-2, B Regan, C McAlinden, K Reid (f), S Conlon, D Roberts 0-1 each.	Report	S Nolan 0-11 (10f), P Boyle 1-3, J Conway 1-2, C Harty, D O'Carroll 0-3 each, D Collins 0-2, B Barrett, P Kelly, J Goulding, P O'Connor, P Lucid, D Griffin 0-1 each.	McGovern Park, Ruislip; Referee: P Burke (Kilkenny)

28 January 2018; Round 1	Kildare	0-16 – 1-16	Meath	St. Conleth's Park, Newbridge; Referee: D Hughes
28 January 2018; Round 1	J Burke (0-9, 8f), R Ryan (0-2, 1f), M Fitzgerald (0-2), E O'Neill (0-1), P Divilly (0-1), J Sheridan (0-1).	Report	J Regan (1-10, 1-0pen, 0-6f, 0-1'65), P Conneely (0-2), J Toher (0-2), J Kelly (0-1), S Quigley (0-1).	St. Conleth's Park, Newbridge; Referee: D Hughes

28 January 2018; Round 1	Carlow	0-15 – 0-19	Westmeath	Netwatch Cullen Park, Carlow; Referee: J Clarke
28 January 2018; Round 1	D Murphy (0-8, 7f), C Nolan (0-3), S Murphy (0-3), M Kavanagh (0-1).	Report	A Devine (0-7, 5f, 1'65), K Doyle (0-4), R Greville (0-3), N Mitchell (0-2), D McNicholas (0-2), C Doyle (0-1).	Netwatch Cullen Park, Carlow; Referee: J Clarke

==== Division 2A Round 2 ====
3 February 2018; Round 2	London	1-14 – 1-24	Meath	McGovern Park, Ruislip; Referee: A Devine (Westmeath)
3 February 2018; Round 2	R Murphy 0-9, D Roberts 1-0, C Lordan 0-2, M Duggan 0-2, T Clarke 0-1.	Report	J Regan 0-10, P Conneely 0-6, S Quigley 1-1, J Toher 0-3, J Kelly 0-3, É Ó Donnchadha 0-1.	McGovern Park, Ruislip; Referee: A Devine (Westmeath)

4 February 2018; Round 2	Westmeath	1-20 – 2-11	Kildare	TEG Cusack Park, Mullingar; Referee: G McGrath (Wexford)
4 February 2018; Round 2	N Mitchell 1-2, A Devine 0-5, N O'Brien 0-4, C Doyle 0-3, R Greville 0-2, K Doyle 0-2, C Boyle 0-1, J Gilligan 0-1.	Report	J Burke 0-9, S Ryan 1-1, M Fitzgerald 1-0, E O'Neill 0-1.	TEG Cusack Park, Mullingar; Referee: G McGrath (Wexford)

4 February 2018; Round 2	Kerry	1-11 – 1-18	Carlow	Austin Stack Park, Tralee; Referee: R McCann
4 February 2018; Round 2	S Nolan (0-4, 3f, 1'65), B Barrett (1-0), P Boyle (0-3), S Conway (0-2), D Collins (0-1), D O'Carroll (0-1).	Report	D Murphy (0-7, 6f), M Kavanagh (0-6, 1f), C Nolan (1-1), J Kavanagh (0-2), K McDonald (0-1), D Byrne (0-1).	Austin Stack Park, Tralee; Referee: R McCann

==== Division 2A Round 3 ====
17 February 2018; 12:00; Round 3	Meath	1-18 - 1-19	Westmeath	St. Loman's Park, Trim; Referee: C Cunning (Antrim)
17 February 2018; 12:00; Round 3	J Regan (1-12, 1-0 pen, 0-9fs), A Douglas (0-2), J Kelly (0-1), C O Mealoid (0-1), A Gannon (0-1), J Toher (0-1).	Report	A Devine (0-4, 3fs), D McNicholas (0-4, 3fs), N Mitchell (0-3), C Doyle (0-3), J Gilligan (1-0), K Doyle (0-2), N O'Brien (0-1), A Craig (0-1), R Greville (0-1).	St. Loman's Park, Trim; Referee: C Cunning (Antrim)

18 February 2018; 13:00; Round 3	London	0-15 - 3-23	Carlow	McGovern Park, Ruislip; Referee: G McGrath (Wexford)
18 February 2018; 13:00; Round 3	R Murphy 0-10 (7fs); C Nelson 0-2; K Reid, D Roberts, F Collins 0-1.	Report	C Nolan 1-5 (0-1f), M Kavanagh (0-1 f), J Doyle 1-4 each; J Nolan 0-4; C Wall 0-2; D English (f), D Byrne, R Kelly, S Murphy 0-1.	McGovern Park, Ruislip; Referee: G McGrath (Wexford)

18 February 2018; 14:00; Round 3	Kildare	0-10 - 1-23	Kerry	St. Conleth's Park, Newbridge; Referee: J Keane (Galway)
18 February 2018; 14:00; Round 3	J Burke 0-4 (4 frees), B Deay 0-1, É O'Neill 0-2, P Divilly 0-1, M Delaney 0-1, C Dowling 0-1,	Report	B O'Leary 1-5 (1 free), S Nolan 0-3 (3 frees), S Conway 0-5 (4 frees), P Boyle 0-2, D O'Carroll 0-1, M O'Connor 0-1, D Griffin 0-2, D Collins 0-1, J Conway 0-1 (free), J Goulding 0-1, D Dineen 0-1 (free).	St. Conleth's Park, Newbridge; Referee: J Keane (Galway)

==== Division 2A Round 4 ====
25 February 2018; 12:30; Round 4	London	1-10 - 2-12	Westmeath	McGovern Park, Ruislip; Referee: J Keane (Galway)
25 February 2018; 12:30; Round 4	R Murphy 0-4 (4f), M Ivors 1-0, K Reid 0-2 (1f), D Moore, H Vaughan, K Burke (f), J Troy 0-1 each.	Report	A Devine 0-6 (3f), N Mitchell 2-0, C Doyle 0-2, C Boyle, G Greville, D McNicholas (f), J Gilligan 0-1 each.	McGovern Park, Ruislip; Referee: J Keane (Galway)

25 February 2018; 12:30; Round 4	Kerry	3-19 - 1-09	Meath	Austin Stack Park, Tralee; Referee: R McCann (Clare)
25 February 2018; 12:30; Round 4	J Goulding 2-3, S Conway 1-4 (1-4f), P Boyle 0-5 (2f), B Barrett 0-2, M Stackpoole, T O'Connor, D Griffin, B O'Leary, C Harty 0-1 each.	Report	J Regan 0-5 (4f), A Douglas 1-1, J Keena, J Kelly, P Conneely 0-1 each.	Austin Stack Park, Tralee; Referee: R McCann (Clare)

25 February 2018; 14:00; Round 4	Carlow	3-15 - 1-06	Kildare	Netwatch Cullen Park, Carlow; Referee: P Burke (Kilkenny)
25 February 2018; 14:00; Round 4	M Kavanagh 2-6 (4f, 0-2 65s), JM Nolan 0-3, J Doyle 1-0, D Byrne 0-2, P Coady, C Nolan, J Kavanagh, E Nolan 0-1 each.	Report	M Delaney 0-5 (0-4f), E O'Neill 1-1.	Netwatch Cullen Park, Carlow; Referee: P Burke (Kilkenny)

==== Division 2A Round 5 ====
10 March 2018; 13:00; Round 5	London	1-19 - 0-15	Kildare	McGovern Park, Ruislip; Referee: R McGann (Clare)
10 March 2018; 13:00; Round 5	R Murphy 0-11 (0-7f, 2 ’65); C Nelson 1-1; K Reid, O Sheil, D Roberts, H Vaughan, C McAlinden, S Lawless, K Burke 0-1.	Report	J Burke 0-6 (0-4f); M Fitzgerald 0-3 (0-1f); M Delaney 0-2 (0-1f); K Whelan, B Byrne, E O’Neill, C Bonus 0-1.	McGovern Park, Ruislip; Referee: R McGann (Clare)

11 March 2018; 13:00; Round 5	Westmeath	1-20 - 0-16	Kerry	TEG Cusack Park, Mullingar; Referee: G Quilty (Kilkenny)
11 March 2018; 13:00; Round 5	A Devine 1-10 (6f, 2'65's), K Doyle 0-4, D Clinton 0-2, J Gilligan, N O'Brien, C Boyle, D McNicholas (f) 0-1 each.	Report	S Conway 0-10 (10f), P Boyle 0-2 (1f), P O'Connor, J Conway, B O'Leary, J Goulding 0-1 each.	TEG Cusack Park, Mullingar; Referee: G Quilty (Kilkenny)

11 March 2018; 13:00; Round 5	Meath	1-13 - 0-20	Carlow	St. Loman's Park, Trim; Referee: G McGrath (Wexford)
11 March 2018; 13:00; Round 5	J Regan 0-10 (7f, 1 '65), A Forde 1-1, S Quigley, P Conneely 0-1 each.	Report	C Nolan 0-6 (1f), M Kavanagh (4fs), J Doyle 0-4 each, D English (f), D Byrne, JM Nolan, P Coady, D Murphy (f), R Kelly 0-1 each.	St. Loman's Park, Trim; Referee: G McGrath (Wexford)

=== Division 2A Final ===
24 March 2018; 15:30; Final	Westmeath	2-12 – 2-19	Carlow	O'Moore Park, Portlaoise; Referee: J Ryan (Tipperary)
24 March 2018; 15:30; Final	A Devine 0-5 (0-5f), E Price 0-3, D Clinton 1-0, N O’Brien 0-1 (0-1f), K Doyle 0-1 (0-1f).	Report	M Kavanagh 1-9 (0-8f, 1-0 pen), J Doyle 1-1, E Byrne 0-3, D Byrne 0-2, C Nolan 0-2, D English 0-2 (0-2f)	O'Moore Park, Portlaoise; Referee: J Ryan (Tipperary)

=== Division 2A scoring statistics ===
Top scorers overall

Rank	Player	Team	Tally	Total	Matches	Average
1	Jack Regan	Meath	2-47	53	5	10.60
2	Allan Devine	Westmeath	1-37	40	6	6.66
3	Richard Murphy	London	0-39	39	5	7.80
4	Martin Kavanagh	Carlow	3-27	36	6	6.00
5	James Burke	Kildare	0-28	28	4	7.00
6	Chris Nolan	Carlow	2-18	24	6	4.00
6	Shane Conway	Kerry	1-21	24	4	6.00
7	James Doyle	Carlow	3-09	18	5	3.60
7	Pádraig Boyle	Kerry	1-15	18	5	3.60
7	Shane Nolan	Kerry	0-18	18	4	4.50

Top scorers in a single game

Rank	Player	Club	Tally	Total	Opposition
1	Jack Regan	Meath	1-12	15	Westmeath
2	Jack Regan	Meath	1-10	13	Kildare
2	Allan Devine	Westmeath	1-10	13	Kerry
3	Martin Kavanagh	Carlow	2-06	12	Kildare
3	Martin Kavanagh	Carlow	1-09	12	Westmeath
4	Shane Nolan	Kerry	0-11	11	London
4	Richard Murphy	London	0-11	11	Kildare
5	Jack Regan	Meath	0-10	10	London
5	Richard Murphy	London	0-10	10	Carlow
5	Shane Conway	Kerry	0-10	10	Westmeath
5	Jack Regan	Meath	0-10	10	Carlow

== Division 2B ==
=== Division 2B Table ===
Division champions, promoted Relegated team

Team	Matches				Score			Pts
Team	Pld	W	D	L	For	Against	Diff	Pts
Down	5	4	0	1	7-89	1-74	+33	8
Mayo	5	4	0	1	6-80	8-67	+7	8
Wicklow	5	3	0	2	11-88	5-92	+14	6
Donegal	5	3	0	2	7-81	7-77	+4	6
Armagh	5	1	0	4	6-73	11-82	–24	2
Derry	5	0	0	5	6-61	11-80	–34	0

=== Division 2B Rounds 1 to 5 ===
==== Division 2B Round 1 ====
28 January 2018; Round 1	Derry	1-14 – 2-17	Down	Celtic Park, Derry; Referee: S Hynes (Galway)
28 January 2018; Round 1	A Grant 0-10 (9fs); B Quigley 1-0; O McCloskey 0-2; N Smyth, M Kirkpatrick (f) 0-1 each.	Report	P Sheehan 0-10 (8fs); D Toner 2-2; D McManus 0-4; R Branagan 0-1.	Celtic Park, Derry; Referee: S Hynes (Galway)

28 January 2018; Round 1	Wicklow	4-20 – 1-12	Armagh	Old Connaught Avenue, Bray; Referee: T Walsh
28 January 2018; Round 1	A O'Brien (2-7, 1-0pen, 0-5f), A Byrne (2-3), G O'Brien (0-3), D Staunton (0-2), W Kavanagh (0-2), S Kelly (0-1), J Connors (0-1), S Germaine (0-1).	Report	C McAnallen (0-8, 7f), D McKenna (1-0), N Green (0-1), E McGuinness (0-1), C Laverty (0-1), D Grant (0-1).	Old Connaught Avenue, Bray; Referee: T Walsh

28 January 2018; Round 1	Mayo	2-16 – 1-09	Donegal	James Stephens Park, Ballina
28 January 2018; Round 1	S Regan (1-2), K Feeney (1-2, 0-1f), K Higgins (0-4, 1f), S Boland (0-4, 3f), C Freeman (0-1), K McDermott (0-1), D Kenny (0-1), P Kiely (0-1).	Report	L Henderson (0-8, 7f, 1'65), D Flynn (1-0), D Cullen (0-1).	James Stephens Park, Ballina

==== Division 2B Round 2 ====
4 February 2018; Round 2	Donegal	4-17 – 2-09	Derry	O'Donnell Park, Letterkenny; Referee: K Brady (Louth)
4 February 2018; Round 2	L Henderson (5f) 0-6, D Coulter, R McDermott, B Lafferty 1-1 each, D Flynn 1-0, C Mathewson 0-3, G Gilmore 0-2, J Boyle, D Cullen, K Campbell 0-1 each.	Report	A Grant (7f) 1-7, P Mullan 1-0, P Cleary (1f) 0-2.	O'Donnell Park, Letterkenny; Referee: K Brady (Louth)

4 February 2018; Round 2	Armagh	2-13 – 3-15	Mayo	Athletic Grounds, Armagh; Referee: D Hughes
4 February 2018; Round 2	O McCann (1-1), C McAnallen (0-4), D Carvill (0-4); E McGuinness (1-0), N Green (0-3); D Magee (0-1).	Report	K Higgins (2-1), S Boland (0-5, 4f), K Feeney (0-5, 3f), C Freeman (1-1, 1-0f); B Hunt (0-1); S Regan (0-1), P Kiely (0-1).	Athletic Grounds, Armagh; Referee: D Hughes

4 February 2018; Round 2	Down	1-24 – 0-16	Wicklow	McKenna Park, Ballycran; Referee: J Connors (Donegal)
4 February 2018; Round 2	P Óg McCrickard 0-5 (4f), P Sheehan, D Toner, M Fisher (3f) 0-4 each, E Sands 1-1, R Branagan 0-3, M Magee 0-2, D Sands 0-1.	Report	A O'Brien 0-10 (6f), G O'Brien 0-2, P Doyle, C Moorehouse Jnr, G Connors, G Byrne 0-1 each.	McKenna Park, Ballycran; Referee: J Connors (Donegal)

==== Division 2B Round 3 ====
18 February 2018; 12:30; Round 3	Derry	0-10 - 0-13	Mayo	Celtic Park, Derry; Referee: A Ferguson (Fermanagh)
18 February 2018; 12:30; Round 3	A Grant 0-3 (1f), O McCloskey 0-2, P Cleary 0-2, M Kirkpatrick 0-1 (f), D Cartin 0-1, N Smyth 0-1.	Report	K Higgins 0-4, K Feeney 0-4, S Boland 0-3 (1f), C Freeman 0-1, S Reagan 0-1.	Celtic Park, Derry; Referee: A Ferguson (Fermanagh)

18 February 2018; 13:00; Round 3	Wicklow	2-21 - 0-21	Donegal	Joule Park, Aughrim; Referee: N Wall (Cork)
18 February 2018; 13:00; Round 3	A O'Brien 0-11 (6f, 1 65); E Donohue, J Henderson 1-0 each; R Keddy, P Doyle, S Germaine, E Kearns 0-2 each; D Staunton, G O'Brien 0-1 each.	Report	L Henderson 0-8 (7f, 1 65); D Flynn 0-4; D Cullen, Ciaran Mathewson 0-2 each; Bernard Lafferty, Gerry Gilmore, Ronan McDermott, Niall Cleary, Sean McVeigh 0-1 each.	Joule Park, Aughrim; Referee: N Wall (Cork)

18 February 2018; 14:00; Round 3	Down	3-15 - 0-13	Armagh	McKenna Park, Ballycran; Referee: J Clarke (Cavan)
18 February 2018; 14:00; Round 3	P Sheehan 1-7 (4f); E Sands 1-1; D Toner 1-0; R Branagan 0-3; M Fisher 0-2 (2f); P Og McCrickard; D Sands 0-1 each.		C McAnallen 0-6 (6f); D Carvill 0-4 (3f); D Magee; T Nevin; C Carvill 0-1 each.	McKenna Park, Ballycran; Referee: J Clarke (Cavan)

==== Division 2B Round 4 ====
25 February 2018; 14:00; Round 4	Derry	1-15 - 2-18	Armagh	Celtic Park, Derry; Referee: J Connors (Donegal)
25 February 2018; 14:00; Round 4	A Grant 0-5 (4fs), O McCloskey 1-1, L Murphy, D Cartin 0-2 (1f) each, J Mullan, M McGuigan, G Bradley (1f), J Phelan, C Murphy 0-1 each.	Report	D Carvill 0-8 (7fs), E McGuinness 1-1, D McCreesh 1-0, N Cury (2fs), J Corvan, S Renaghan 0-2 each, C McAnallen, N Green, B Short 0-1 each.	Celtic Park, Derry; Referee: J Connors (Donegal)

25 February 2018; 14:00; Round 4	Donegal	0-17 - 0-14	Down	O'Donnell Park, Letterkenny; Referee: J Clarke (Cavan)
25 February 2018; 14:00; Round 4	D Cullen (0-4), L Henderson (0-4, 4f), C Mathewson (0-3), D Coulter (0-2), G Gilmore (0-1), D Flynn (0-1), S McVeigh (0-1), E McDermott (0-1).	Report	P Sheehan (0-5, 2’65), D McManus (0-4, 2f), P Og McCrickard (0-1), M Magee (0-1), C Baile (0-1), O McManus (0-1).	O'Donnell Park, Letterkenny; Referee: J Clarke (Cavan)

25 February 2018; 14:00; Round 4	Mayo	1-22 - 2-16	Wicklow	James Stephens Park, Ballina; Referee: K McGeeney (Roscommon)
25 February 2018; 14:00; Round 4	K Feeney (0-10, 9f ), K Higgins (0-4 ), B Morley (1-0 ), P Kiely (0-2 ), K McDermott (0-2 ), D Kenny (0-1 ), C Freeman (0-1 ), S Mulroy (0-1 ), C Schaill (0-1 )	Report	A O’Brien (0-9, 5f, 1 65’ ), E Donohoe (1-0 ), C Moorehouse (1-0 ), D Staunton (0-3, 1f ), R Keddy (0-3 ), P Doyle (0-1 ), A Byrne (0-1)	James Stephens Park, Ballina; Referee: K McGeeney (Roscommon)

==== Division 2B Round 5 ====
11 March 2018; 14:30; Round 5	Armagh	1-17 - 2-17	Donegal	Athletic Grounds, Armagh; Referee: K McGeeney (Roscommon)
11 March 2018; 14:30; Round 5	D Carvill 1-12 (1-0 pen, 5fS, '65), S Renaghan, R Gaffney, E McGuinness, C Carvill, K McKernan 0-1 each.	Report	L Henderson 0-8 (5fs), D Coulter 2-1 (1-0 pen), C Matthewson 0-3, B Lafferty 0-2, D Cullen, D Flynn, R McDermott 0-1 each.	Athletic Grounds, Armagh; Referee: K McGeeney (Roscommon)

11 March 2018; 14:30; Round 5	Down	3-19 - 0-14	Mayo	McKenna Park, Ballycran
11 March 2018; 14:30; Round 5	P Sheehan 0-6 (4f), D Sands 1-2, D Mc Manus 0-5, E Sands 1-1, L Savage 1-0, M Fisher 0-2 (1f); C Bailie, C Teggart M Magee 0-1 each.	Report	S Boland 0-7 (7f), C Scahill 0-2, B Douglas, K Feeney (1f), K Higgins D McTigue (0-1), J Cotter 0-1 each	McKenna Park, Ballycran

11 March 2018; 14:30; Round 5	Wicklow	3-15 - 2-13	Derry	Old Connaught Avenue, Bray; Referee: P Burke (Kilkenny)
11 March 2018; 14:30; Round 5	A O'Brien 2-4 (1 65, 1f), G O'Brien 1-3, J Connors 0-5 (2f), D Staunton 0-2, R Keddy 0-1.	Report	A Grant (3f) 0-5, M McGrath 1-1, A O'Donnell 1-0, C O'Doherty 0-2, L Murphy, M McGuigan, C Murphy, B Quigley, N Waldron 0-1 each.	Old Connaught Avenue, Bray; Referee: P Burke (Kilkenny)

=== Division 2B Final ===
18 March 2018; 13:00; Final	Down	0-14 - 1-15	Mayo	Kingspan Breffni Park, Cavan; Referee: G Quilty (Kilkenny)
18 March 2018; 13:00; Final	P Sheehan (0-7, 0-5f), D Sands (0-2), D McManus (0-2), P McCrickard (0-1), C Bailie (0-1), D Toner (0-1).	Report	K Feeney (0-12, 0-9f), B Morley (1-0), K Higgins (0-2), C Freeman (0-1).	Kingspan Breffni Park, Cavan; Referee: G Quilty (Kilkenny)

=== Division 2B relegation play-off ===
The losing team is relegated and plays in next year's Division 3A.

24 March 2018; 13:00; Relegation play-off	Armagh	0-10 - 2-22	Derry	Fr. Tierney Park, Ballyshannon; Referee: J Connors (Donegal)
24 March 2018; 13:00; Relegation play-off	D Carville (0-3 2f), C McAnallen (0-2 1f), K McKernan (0-2), E McGuinness (0-2), R Gaffney (0-1f).	Report	S McGuigan (1-2), M McGrath (1-1), A Grant (0-4f), G Bradley (0-4), M McGuigan (0-3), C O’Doherty (0-3), N Waldron (0-3), A O’Donnell (0-1), L Murphy (0-1), J Phelan (0-1).	Fr. Tierney Park, Ballyshannon; Referee: J Connors (Donegal)

=== Division 2B scoring statistics ===
Top scorers overall

Rank	Player	Team	Tally	Total	Matches	Average
1	Andy O'Brien	Wicklow	4-41	53	5	10.60
2	Paul Sheehan	Down	1-39	42	6	7.00
3	Alan Grant	Derry	1-34	37	6	6.16
3	Kenny Feeney	Mayo	1-34	37	6	6.16
4	David Carvill	Armagh	1-31	34	5	6.80
4	Lee Henderson	Donegal	0-34	34	5	6.80
5	Keith Higgins	Mayo	2-16	22	6	3.66
6	Conor McAnallen	Armagh	0-21	21	6	3.50
7	Shane Boland	Mayo	0-19	19	6	3.16
8	Danny Toner	Down	3-07	16	4	4.00

Top scorers in a single game

Rank	Player	Club	Tally	Total	Opposition
1	David Carvill	Armagh	1-12	15	Wicklow
2	Andy O'Brien	Wicklow	2-07	13	Armagh
3	Kenny Feeney	Mayo	0-12	12	Down
4	Andy O'Brien	Wicklow	0-11	11	Donegal
5	Andy O'Brien	Wicklow	2-04	10	Derry
5	Paul Sheehan	Down	1-07	10	Armagh
5	Alan Grant	Derry	1-07	10	Donegal
5	Kenny Feeny	Mayo	0-10	10	Wicklow
5	Alan Grant	Derry	0-10	10	Down
5	Paul Sheehan	Down	0-10	10	Derry
5	Andy O'Brien	Wicklow	0-10	10	Down

== Division 3A ==
=== Division 3A Table ===
Division champions, promoted Relegated team

Team	Matches				Score			Pts
Team	Pld	W	D	L	For	Against	Diff	Pts
Warwickshire	5	4	1	0	8-86	9-64	+19	9
Louth	5	2	2	1	11-64	10-74	–7	6
Tyrone	5	3	0	2	7-86	9-71	+9	6
Roscommon	5	2	1	2	9-78	4-67	+21	5
Monaghan	5	1	2	2	4-75	6-70	–1	4
Longford	5	0	0	5	7-54	8-93	–42	0

=== Division 3A Rounds 1 to 5 ===
==== Division 3A Round 1 ====
28 January 2018; Round 1	Roscommon	3-18 – 1-06	Louth	Dr. Hyde Park, Roscommon; Referee: T Gleeson (Dublin)
28 January 2018; Round 1	D Glynn 0-13 (12f), G Keenan, W Boyle, N Connaughton 1-0 each, C Kelly 0-2, E Flanagan, R Fallon, C Egan 0-1 each.	Report	R Geoghegan 0-4 (2f, 2 '65s), P Matthews 1-0, M Molly, P Lynch 0-1 each.	Dr. Hyde Park, Roscommon; Referee: T Gleeson (Dublin)

28 January 2018; Round 1	Tyrone	2-14 – 3-16	Warwickshire	O'Neill Park, Dungannon; Referee: K Brady (Louth)
28 January 2018; Round 1	D Casey 0-8, A Kelly 1-1, B McGurk 1-0, L Armstrong 0-2, C Kearns 0-2, T Morgan 0-1.	Report	N McKenna 0-9, I Dwyer 2-0, G Lennon 1-0, P Uniacke 0-3, B Fallon 0-2, K Magee 0-1, P Crehan 0-1.	O'Neill Park, Dungannon; Referee: K Brady (Louth)

28 January 2018; Round 1	Longford	0-12 – 0-16	Monaghan	Pearse Park, Longford; Referee: S Stack (Dublin)
28 January 2018; Round 1	C Mullane 0-7, (6f); J Mulhern 0-3; P Walsh 0-2.	Report	F Rafter 0-8, (4f,’ 2 ‘65’); C Flynn 0-3; M Treanor 0-2; B Guinan 0-1; M Murphy 0-1; J Guinan 0-1.	Pearse Park, Longford; Referee: S Stack (Dublin)

==== Division 3A Round 2 ====
3 February 2018; Round 2	Warwickshire	1-14 – 0-11	Longford	Páirc na hÉireann, Solihull; Referee: N Wall
3 February 2018; Round 2	K Magee (1-1); S Caulfield (0-4, 4f); N McKenna (0-3, 2f); N Kennedy (0-3); D Nugent (0-1); P Uniacke (0-1); B Fallon (0-1).	Report	C Mullane (0-6, 5f); P Walsh (0-2); S Stakelum (0-2); B Hanley (0-1).	Páirc na hÉireann, Solihull; Referee: N Wall

4 February 2018; Round 2	Monaghan	0-16 – 1-13	Roscommon	Grattan Park, Inniskeen; Referee: J Clarke
4 February 2018; Round 2	F Rafter (0-6, 5f), M Treanor (0-4), A Kenny (0-2), B McGuigan (0-2), C Flynn (0-1); P Treanor (0-1).	Report	D Glynn (0-9, 8f), E Flanagan (1-0), C Egan (0-2), S Curley (0-1), K Hardiman (0-1).	Grattan Park, Inniskeen; Referee: J Clarke

4 February 2018; Round 2	Louth	4-12 – 0-20	Tyrone	Darver; Referee: C Cooney
4 February 2018; Round 2	N Arthur (2-9, 0-7f), G Smyth (1-0), S Callan (1-0), A McCrave (0-1); P Matthews (0-1), P Lynch (0-1).	Report	D Casey (0-13, 9f), A Kelly (0-3), R McKernan (0-2); B Begley (0-1), L Armstrong (0-1).	Darver; Referee: C Cooney

==== Division 3A Round 3 ====
18 February 2018; 12:30; Round 3	Roscommon	1-25 - 1-10	Longford	Dr. Hyde Park, Roscommon; Referee: L Gordon (Galway)
18 February 2018; 12:30; Round 3	D Glynn 0-13 (6fs, 2 '65s'), E Flanagan 1-3, R Fallon 0-3, S Curley 0-2, K Hardiman, C Kelly, J Murray, P Kellehan 0-1 each.	Report	C Mullane 1-7 (3fs, 2 '65s'), D Connell, PJ Masterson, K Murray 0-1 each.	Dr. Hyde Park, Roscommon; Referee: L Gordon (Galway)

18 February 2018; 12:30; Round 3	Monaghan	0-17 - 2-15	Tyrone	Grattan Park, Inniskeen; Referee: J Connors (Donegal)
18 February 2018; 12:30; Round 3	Rafter 0-12 (9f), N Garland 0-2, C Flynn, B McGuigan and C Power 0-1 each.	Report	D Casey 2-11 (9f), P Daly 0-2, A Kelly and L Armstrong 0-1 each. Monaghan:	Grattan Park, Inniskeen; Referee: J Connors (Donegal)

18 February 2018; 13:00; Round 3	Louth	1-16 - 1-16	Warwickshire	Darver; Referee: S Stack (Dublin)
18 February 2018; 13:00; Round 3	N Arthur 0-11 (9fs), S Connelly 1-1, P Lynch 0-2, D Murphy, S Callan 0-1 each.	Report	N McKenna 0-7 (2fs), I Dwyer 1-1, P Hoban 0-4fs, G Lennon, K McGee, C McBride, N Kennedy 0-1 each.	Darver; Referee: S Stack (Dublin)

==== Division 3A Round 4 ====
24 February 2018; 14:30; Round 4	Warwickshire	2-17 - 3-13	Monaghan	Páirc na hÉireann, Solihull; Referee: A Ferguson (Fermanagh)
24 February 2018; 14:30; Round 4	N McKenna 1-4 (2f), D Nugent 1-2 (1f), K Magee 0-3, J Collins, S Caulfield 0-2 each, P Hoban, N Kennedy, P Scally, I Dwyer 0-1 each	Report	F Rafter 0-11 (8f, 2'65), E Collins 1-2, P McGahon, M Treanor 1-0 each	Páirc na hÉireann, Solihull; Referee: A Ferguson (Fermanagh)

25 February 2018; 12:30; Round 4	Longford	5-07 - 4-17	Louth	Pearse Park, Longford; Referee: C Mooney (Dublin)
25 February 2018; 12:30; Round 4	J O'Brien 2-4 (3f); P Walsh 2-0; R Murray 1-0; C Mullane (f), D Connell and J Casey 0-1 each.	Report	N Arthur 4- 12 (5f, '65); P Lynch 0-2; M Molloy, G Arthur, S Connelly 0-1 each. Longford:	Pearse Park, Longford; Referee: C Mooney (Dublin)

25 February 2018; 14:00; Round 4	Tyrone	1-16 - 1-12	Roscommon	Healy Park, Omagh
25 February 2018; 14:00; Round 4	D Casey 0-13 (9f, 1 sideline), R McKernan 1-0, B McGurk, L Armstrong, P Daly 0-1 each.	Report	R Fallon 1-0, D Glynn 0-9 (7f, 2 '65), G Keenan 0-2, C Kelly 0-1.	Healy Park, Omagh

==== Division 3A Round 5 ====
11 March 2018; 13:00; Round 5	Roscommon	3-10 - 1-23	Warwickshire	Dr. Hyde Park, Roscommon; Referee: S Hynes (Galway)
11 March 2018; 13:00; Round 5	S Curley 0-6 (2fs); C Kelly 1-2; N Connaughton, R Kelly 1-0 each; J Keane (f), D Glynn (f) 0-1 each.	Report	N McKenna 1-10 (5fs); I Dwyer 0-3; P Hoban (2f), G Lennon, D Nugent 0-2 each; J Collins, S Caulfield (1f), P Uniacke, K Magee 0-1 each.	Dr. Hyde Park, Roscommon; Referee: S Hynes (Galway)

11 March 2018; 14:00; Round 5	Monaghan	1-13 - 1-13	Louth	St. Mary's Park, Castleblayney; Referee: A Devine (Westmeath)
11 March 2018; 14:00; Round 5	F Rafter 0-8 (7f), M Treanor 1-0, N Garland 0-3, C McNally and B McGuigan 0-1 each	Report	N Arthur 1-9 (5f), R Byrne 0-2 (2f), M Molloy and G Smyth 0-1 each	St. Mary's Park, Castleblayney; Referee: A Devine (Westmeath)

11 March 2018; 14:00; Round 5	Longford	1-14 - 2-21	Tyrone	Pearse Park, Longford; Referee: J Connors (Donegal)
11 March 2018; 14:00; Round 5	J O'Brien 0-12 (10f), P Walsh 1-0, S O'Brien, D Duggan 0-1 each.	Report	D Casey 0-15, (7f '65'), B McGurk 1-1, P O'Kelly 1-2, R McKernan 0-2, P Daly 0-1.	Pearse Park, Longford; Referee: J Connors (Donegal)

=== Division 3A Final ===
24 March 2018; 13:00; Final	Warwickshire	0-20 - 1-14	Louth	St. Loman's Park, Trim; Referee: S Hynes (Galway)
24 March 2018; 13:00; Final	N McKenna (0-6, 6f); P Hoban (0-5, 4f, 1 65), N Kennedy (0-3), P Uniacke (0-2), S Caulfield (0-2); GLennon (0-1), K Magee (0-1).	Report	N Arthur (0-9, 8f), G Smyth (1-0), R Byrne (0-1, 1f), A McCrave (0-1); D Ryan (0-1), M Molloy (0-1); G Arthur (0-1).	St. Loman's Park, Trim; Referee: S Hynes (Galway)

=== Division 3A scoring statistics ===
Top scorers overall

Rank	Player	Team	Tally	Total	Matches	Average
1	Niall Arthur	Louth	7-50	71	6	11.83
2	Damian Casey	Tyrone	2-60	66	5	13.20
3	Niall McKenna	Warwickshire	2-39	45	6	7.50
3	Daniel Glynn	Roscommon	0-45	45	5	9.00
3	Fergal Rafter	Monaghan	0-45	45	5	9.00
4	Cathal Mullane	Longford	1-21	24	4	6.00
5	John O'Brien	Longford	2-16	22	2	11.00
6	Ian Dwyer	Warwickshire	3-05	14	6	2.33
7	Patrick Walsh	Longford	3-04	13	5	2.60
8	Paul Hoban	Warwickshire	0-12	12	4	3.00

Top scorers in a single game

Rank	Player	Club	Tally	Total	Opposition
1	Niall Arthur	Louth	4-12	24	Longford
2	Damian Casey	Tyrone	2-11	17	Monaghan
3	Niall Arthur	Louth	2-09	15	Tyrone
3	Damian Casey	Tyrone	0-15	15	Longford
4	Niall McKenna	Warwickshire	1-10	13	Roscommon
4	Daniel Glynn	Roscommon	0-13	13	Louth
4	Daniel Glynn	Roscommon	0-13	13	Longford
4	Damian Casey	Tyrone	0-13	13	Louth
4	Damian Casey	Tyrone	0-13	13	Roscommon
5	Niall Arthur	Louth	1-09	12	Monaghan
5	Joe O'Brien	Longford	0-12	12	Tyrone
5	Fergal Rafter	Monaghan	0-12	12	Tyrone

== Division 3B ==
=== Division 3B Table ===
Division champion, promoted

Team	Matches				Score			Pts
Team	Pld	W	D	L	For	Against	Diff	Pts
Lancashire	4	4	0	0	7-63	4-46	+36	8
Leitrim	4	3	0	1	9-56	3-41	+33	6
Sligo	4	2	0	2	7-49	4-43	+15	4
Cavan	4	1	0	3	7-31	10-74	-52	2
Fermanagh	4	0	0	4	1-53	10-58	-32	0

=== Division 3B Rounds 1 to 5 ===
==== Division 3B Round 1 ====
28 January 2018; Round 1	Lancashire	2-25 – 1-11	Fermanagh	Randalstown
28 January 2018; Round 1	R Crowley (2-14), T Duane (0-3); JJ Dunphy (0-2), D Crowley (0-1f), M Hawley (0-1), N Unwin (0-1); J Fitzmaurice (0-1), S Duncan (0-1); P Duggan (0-1).	Report	S Curran (0-4f), B McPhillips (1-0), C McShea (0-2, 1f), M Teague (0-2); F McBrien (0-2), J Duffy (0-1f).	Randalstown

28 January 2018; Round 1	Leitrim	1-09 – 0-08	Sligo	Tourlestrane; Referee: J Connors
28 January 2018; Round 1	B Murray (1-2, 1-0f), C Cunniffe (0-3f), Z Moradi (0-2), K McDermott (0-1); C O'Donovan (0-1).	Report	J McHugh (0-4, 2f); K Prior (0-1), E Comerford (0-1f), G Cadden (0-1), D Collery (0-1).	Tourlestrane; Referee: J Connors

==== Division 3B Round 2 ====
4 February 2018; Round 2	Leitrim	0-14 – 0-15	Lancashire	Ballinamore
4 February 2018; Round 2	C Cunniffe 0-9, (9f), Z Moradi & B Murray 0-2 each, C O’Donovan 0-1	Report	R Crowley 0-13, (2 '65s', 8f), T Duane & N Unwin 0-1 each	Ballinamore

4 February 2018; Round 2	Cavan	0-04 – 2-19	Sligo	Kingspan Breffni, Cavan; Referee: T Gleeson
4 February 2018; Round 2	P Sheridan 0-3f), A Sheridan (0-1).	Report	R Brennan (0-9, 8f), K Banks (1-3); T O'Kelly-Lynch (1-0), G Cadden (0-2), E McDonagh (0-2, 1f), L Cadden (0-1), E Comerford (0-1); K Raymond (0-1f).	Kingspan Breffni, Cavan; Referee: T Gleeson

==== Division 3B Round 3 ====
18 February 2018; 13:00; Round 3	Lancashire	2-18 - 1-12	Cavan	Jordanstown; Referee: K Brady (Dublin)
18 February 2018; 13:00; Round 3	R Crowley 0-11 (4f), M Hawley 2-0, D Crowley 0-3, N Unwin 0-2, JJ Dunphy 0-2.	Report	P Sheridan 0-7 (7f), A Sheridan 1-1, S Keating 0-3 (3 '65), P Brady 0-1.	Jordanstown; Referee: K Brady (Dublin)

18 February 2018; 14:00; Round 3	Fermanagh	0-11 - 2-12	Leitrim	Irvinestown; Referee: A Devine (Westmeath)
18 February 2018; 14:00; Round 3	J Duffy 1-5 (0-4fs), R Ó Buaigh 0-4 (1f), T Cleary, JP McGarry 0-1 each.	Report	C Moreton, Z Moradi 1-0 each, C Cunniffe 0-7 (6fs, 1 '65'), C O'Donovan 0-4, B Murray 0-1.	Irvinestown; Referee: A Devine (Westmeath)

==== Division 3B Round 4 ====
24 February 2018; 12:00; Round 4	Sligo	2-09 - 3-15	Lancashire	Markievicz Park, Sligo; Referee: L Gordon
24 February 2018; 12:00; Round 4	T O'Kelly-Lynch, F O'Flynn 1-0 each, R Brennan 0-4 (4f), K Gilmartin 0-2, R MacNamara, J McHugh, K Banks 0-1 each.	Report	R Crowley 2-8 (7f), M Hawley 1-1, D Crowley 0-3, S Duncan, D Power, N Unwin 0-1 each;	Markievicz Park, Sligo; Referee: L Gordon

25 February 2018; 14:00; Round 4	Cavan	3-08 - 0-16	Fermanagh	Kingspan Breffni, Cavan; Referee: T Gleeson (Dublin)
25 February 2018; 14:00; Round 4	P Brady 2-1, S Keating 0-5 (4f, '65), C Wall 1-0, A Sheridan 0-1, P Sheridan 0-1 (f).	Report	S Curran 0-11 (6f, 2 65s), J Duffy, C McShea, F McBrien, R Bogue (f), B McPhillips 0-1.	Kingspan Breffni, Cavan; Referee: T Gleeson (Dublin)

==== Division 3B Round 5 ====
11 March 2018; 14:30; Round 5	Leitrim	6-21 - 3-07	Cavan	Páirc Seán Mac Diarmada, Carrick; Referee: L Gordon
11 March 2018; 14:30; Round 5	C Cunniffe (4-6, 0-4f), Z Moradi (2-4), C O'Donovan (0-5, 1f), E Moreton (0-1), C Byrne (0-1'65), J Glancy (0-1), B Murray (0-1), K McDermott (0-1), J McNabola (0-1).	Report	S Keating (1-6, 0-3f, 0-1'65); C Wall (2-1).	Páirc Seán Mac Diarmada, Carrick; Referee: L Gordon

11 March 2018; 14:30; Round 5	Fermanagh	0-15 - 3-13	Sligo	Lisbellaw; Referee: J Keane
11 March 2018; 14:30; Round 5	S Curran (0-6, 4f); J Duffy (0-5, 3f), JP McGarry (0-2), R Bogue (0-1), F McBrien (0-1).	Report	K Gilmartin (1-7, 0-4f), T O'Kelly Lynch (2-0), K Banks (0-4), E McDonagh (0-2).	Lisbellaw; Referee: J Keane

=== Division 3B Final ===
25 March 2018; 12:00; Final	Lancashire	1-25 - 1-18 (aet)	Leitrim	First Ulsters Park, Ballyconnell; Referee: K Brady (Louth)
25 March 2018; 12:00; Final	R Crowley 0-16 (2 65s, 0-10f), E Kenny 0-4, M Hawley 1-0, D Crowley 0-2, D Maskey, E McKillop and D O’Brien 0-1 each.	Report	C Cunniffe 1-10 (0-9f), C Byrne (0-1f), B Murray, Z Moradi and D McGovern 0-2 each.	First Ulsters Park, Ballyconnell; Referee: K Brady (Louth)

=== Division 3B scoring statistics ===
Top scorers overall

Rank	Player	Team	Tally	Total	Matches	Average
1	Ronan Crowley	Lancashire	4-62	74	5	14.80
2	Clement Cunniffe	Leitrim	5-35	50	5	10.00
3	Shea Curran	Fermanagh	0-21	21	4	5.25
4	Zak Moradi	Leitrim	3-10	19	5	3.80
5	Seán Keating	Cavan	1-14	17	4	4.25
6	John Duffy	Fermanagh	1-12	15	4	3.75
7	Martin Hawley	Lancashire	4-02	14	5	2.80
8	Ruairí Brennan	Sligo	0-13	13	4	3.25
9	Tony O'Kelly-Lynch	Sligo	4-00	12	4	3.00
9	Cormac Wall	Cavan	2-06	12	3	4.00
9	Kevin Gilmartin	Sligo	1-09	12	2	6.00

Top scorers in a single game

Rank	Player	Club	Tally	Total	Opposition
1	Ronan Crowley	Lancashire	2-14	20	Fermanagh
2	Clement Cunniffe	Leitrim	4-06	18	Cavan
3	Ronan Crowley	Lancashire	0-16	16	Leitrim
4	Ronan Crowley	Lancashire	2-08	14	Sligo
5	Clement Cunniffe	Leitrim	1-10	13	Lancashire
5	Ronan Crowley	Lancashire	0-13	13	Leitrim
6	Shea Curran	Fermanagh	0-11	11	Cavan
7	Zak Moradi	Leitrim	2-04	10	Cavan
7	Kevin Gilmartin	Sligo	1-07	10	Fermanagh
7	Ronan Crowley	Lancashire	0-10	10	Cavan
