= 2024 Wexford Senior Hurling Championship =

Annual hurling competition season

- Dates: 5 July - 3 November 2024
- Teams: 12
- Sponsor: Pettitt's SuperValu
- Champions: St Martin's (5th title); Conor Firman (captain); Daithí Hayes (manager)
- Runners-up: St Anne's Rathangan; Justin Moran (captain); Cormac Pettitt (captain); David Redmond (manager)
- Relegated: Cloughbawn

Tournament statistics
- Matches played: 42
- Goals scored: 107 (2.55 per match)
- Points scored: 1471 (35.02 per match)
- Top scorer(s): Rory O'Connor (3-79)

The 2024 Wexford Senior Hurling Championship is the 114th staging of the Wexford Senior Hurling Championship since its establishment by the Wexford County Board in 1889. The draw for the group stage places took place on 10 February 2024. The championship is scheduled to run from 5 July to 3 November 2024.

Naomh Éanna were the defending champions, however, they were beaten by St Martin's in the semi-finals.

The final was played on 3 November 2024 at Chadwicks Wexford Park, between St Martin's and St Anne's Rathangan, in what was their second meeting in the final overall and a first meeting in five years. St Martin's won the match by 1-22 to 0-19 to claim their fifth championship title overall and a first title in five years.

Rory O'Connor was the championship's top scorer with 3-79.

== Format change ==
As a result of a proposal approved by club delegates, it was agreed that all teams would progress to the knockout stages of the championships no matter where they finished in their group. The first and second-placed teams in both groups progressed automatically to the quarter-finals. The four remaining teams in each group progressed to the preliminary quarter-finals.

== Team changes ==
=== To Championship ===
Promoted from the Wexford Intermediate Hurling Championship

- Cloughbawn

=== From Championship ===
Relegated to the Wexford Intermediate Hurling Championship

- Rathnure

== Group A ==
=== Group A table ===
Advance to quarter-finals Advance to preliminary quarter-finals

Team	Matches				Score			Pts
Team	Pld	W	D	L	For	Against	Diff	Pts
St Anne's Rathangan	5	4	1	0	125	95	30	9
Naomh Éanna	5	3	2	0	132	94	38	8
Ferns St Aidan's	5	3	1	1	127	104	23	7
Glynn–Barntown	5	2	0	3	89	104	-15	4
Oulart–the Ballagh	5	1	0	3	113	134	-21	2
Crossabeg–Ballymurn	5	0	0	5	93	148	-55	0

=== Group A results ===
5 July 2024 Round 1	Oulart-the Ballagh	0-15 - 1-26	St Anne's Rathangan	Samaritans St Patrick's Park
	B Dunne 0-6, A McRedmond 0-4, L Nimmo 0-3, D Gray 0-1, C O'Leary 0-1.		K Kennedy 0-9, L Rochford 1-1, A Moran 0-4, L Óg McGovern 0-3, M Furlong 0-3, C Byrne 0-2, D O'Keeffe 0-2, A Rochford 0-1, D O'Brien 0-1.

6 July 2024 Round 1	Naomh Éanna	2-20 - 0-11	Glynn-Barntown	McCauley Park
	P Doyle 0-4, C Molloy 1-0, C Dunbar 1-0, C McDonald 0-3, J Doran 0-3, G Molloy 0-2, A Doyle 0-2, JJ Twamley 0-2, J Cullen 0-2, B Travers 0-1, C Ó Tuama 0-1.		J Leacy 0-7, L Donoghue 0-1, S Cooney 0-1, K Crean 0-1, M O'Regan 0-1.

6 July 2024 Round 1	Crossabeg-Ballymurn	2-10 - 2-23	Ferns St Aidan's	McCauley Park
	M Byrne 1-6, J White 1-0, O Foley 0-3, B Eviston 0-1.		I Byrne 0-10, C Byrne-Dunbar 2-1, P Morris 0-6, N Murphy 0-2, G Bailey 0-1, J Dwyer 0-1, R Nolan 0-1, C Turner 0-1.

12 July 2024 Round 2	Glynn-Barntown	1-20 - 0-22	Oulart-the Ballagh	Ferns Grounds
	J Leacy 0-7, C Mahoney 0-5, P Berry 1-0, L Donoghue 0-3, S Cooney 0-2, K Crean 0-1, M Laffan 0-1, C Cooney 0-1.		B Dunne 0-9, S Roche 0-5, C O'Leary 0-4, L Nimmo 0-2, E Moore 0-1, M Óg Storey 0-1.

12 July 2024 Round 2	St Anne's Rathangan	4-21 - 0-22	Crossabeg-Ballymurn	Chadwicks Wexford Park
	K Kennedy 1-7, L Óg McGovern 1-1, D O'Brien 1-0, A Rochford 1-0, M Furlong 0-2, C Byrne 0-2, L Rochford 0-2, A Moran 0-2, A Kennedy 0-2, B Kavanagh 0-1, D Furlong 0-1, C Murphy 0-1.		M Byrne 0-10, O Foley 0-3, B Eviston 0-2, J Kelly 0-2, J White 0-2, D McCarthy 0-1, N Cullen 0-1, C Devereux 0-1.

14 July 2024 Round 2	Naomh Éanna	1-20 - 0-23	Ferns St Aidan's	Chadwicks Wexford Park
	C Dunbar 1-4, J Cullen 0-4, C McGuckin 0-4, P Doyle 0-3, C McDonald 0-2, C Ó Tuama 0-1, C Molloy 0-1, JJ Twamley 0-1.		I Byrne 0-10, J Dwyer 0-3, G Bailey 0-2, P Morris 0-2, J Lawlor 0-2, C Scallan 0-1, C Byrne-Dunbar 0-1, C Turner 0-1, C O'Connor 0-1.

2 August 2024 Round 3	Glynn-Barntown	2-15 - 1-09	Crossabeg-Ballymurn	Chadwicks Wexford Park
	C Mahoney 1-3, J Leacy 0-6, M Furlong 1-0, M Laffan 0-2, L Donoghue 0-2, M Fanning 0-1, G Dempsey 0-1.		O Foley 1-0, P Devereux 0-2, M Byrne 0-2, N Cullen 0-2, M Bishop 0-1, J White 0-1, P Foley 0-1.

3 August 2024 Round 3	St Anne's Rathangan	1-21 - 1-17	Ferns St Aidan's	Chadwicks Wexford Park
	K Kennedy 1-8, L Rochford 0-4, A Moran 0-2, J Moran 0-2, M Furlong 0-1, L Óg McGovern 0-1, D Furlong 0-1, B Kavanagh 0-1, C Byrne 0-1.		I Byrne 1-9, C Byrne-Dunbar 0-2, P Morris 0-2, J Dwyer 0-1, C O'Connor 0-1, J Lawlor 0-1, P Breen 0-1.

3 August 2024 Round 3	Naomh Éanna	2-20 - 2-17	Oulart-the Ballagh	Monamolin Grounds
	A Doyle 1-4, P Doyle 1-3, J Cullen 0-6, JJ Twamley 0-2, C Dunbar 0-2, C McGuckin 0-1, C Molloy 0-1, J Doran 0-1.		B Dunne 1-9, S Roche 1-2, A McRedmond 0-3, L Nimmo 0-1, N Kirwan 0-1, K Nimmo 0-1.

25 August 2024 Round 4	Oulart-the Ballagh	5-15 - 3-19	Crossabeg-Ballymurn	McCauley Park
	B Dunne 2-9, S Roche 2-1, L Nimmo 1-0, C O'Leary 0-1, M Óg Storey 0-1, S Murphy 0-1, D Gray 0-1, T Storey 0-1.		O Foley 3-9, P Devereux 0-3, D McCarthy 0-2, R Devereux 0-1, M Byrne 0-1, P Foley 0-1 J Kelly 0-1, M O'Connor 0-1.

25 August 2024 Round 4	Glynn-Barntown	1-15 - 0-27	Ferns St Aidan's	McCauley Park
	J Leacy 0-8, L Donoghue 0-4, D Murphy 1-0, C Cooney 0-1, D Carley 0-1, C Mahoney 0-1.		I Byrne 0-10, P Morris 0-6, R Scallan 0-5, G Bailey 0-2, J Dwyer 0-1, C Byrne-Dunbar 0-1, E Murphy 0-1, J Lawlor 0-1.

25 August 2024 Round 4	Naomh Éanna	0-22 - 0-22	St Anne's Rathangan	Chadwicks Wexford Park
	J Cullen 0-5, C McDonald 0-5, P Doyle 0-4, C Dunbar 0-3, A Doyle 0-2, C Ó Tuama 0-1, JJ Twamley 0-1, C Browne 0-1.		K Kennedy 0-9, J Moran 0-4, A Kennedy 0-4, D O'Keeffe 0-3, L Rochford 0-1, L Óg McGovern 0-1.

1 September 2024 Round 5	Naomh Éanna	4-23 - 1-12	Crossabeg-Ballymurn	McCauley Park
	C McDonald 3-3, J Cullen 0-8, JJ Twamley 1-3, C Dunbar 0-4, P Doyle 0-2, C Ó Tuama 0-1, G Molloy 0-1, A Doyle 0-1.		O Foley 0-10, N Scallan 1-0, B Eviston 0-1, P Devereux 0-1.

1 September 2024 Round 5	Glynn-Barntown	1-13 - 0-17	St Anne's Rathangan	O'Kennedy Park
	J Leacy 0-8, M Fanning 1-0, C Cooney 0-2, F Cooney 0-1, D Murphy 0-1, M Furlong 0-1.		K Kennedy 0-8, J Moran 0-4, L Redmond 0-1, D O'Keeffe 0-1, D Furlong 0-1, M Fogarty 0-1, A Kennedy 0-1.

1 September 2024 Round 5	Oulart-the Ballagh	3-14 - 3-19	Ferns St Aidan's	Monamolin Grounds
	N Kirwan 3-3, C Blake 0-4, S Roche 0-3, D Gray 0-1, A Roche 0-1, C O'Leary 0-1, A McRedmond 0-1.		C Byrne-Dunbar 2-6, R Nolan 1-0, I Byrne 0-3, R Scallan 0-2, C Turner 0-2, G Bailey 0-1, P Breen 0-1, E Murphy 0-1, P Morris 0-1, B Jordan 0-1, J Dwyer 0-1.

== Group B ==
=== Group B table ===
Advance to quarter-finals Advance to preliminary quarter-finals

Team	Matches				Score			Pts
Team	Pld	W	D	L	For	Against	Diff	Pts
Shelmaliers	5	4	0	1	106	94	12	8
St Martin's	5	4	0	1	122	81	41	8
Faythe Harriers	5	3	0	2	104	95	9	6
Oylegate–Glenbrien	5	2	0	3	94	124	-30	4
Cloughbawn	5	2	0	3	106	98	8	4
Rapparees	5	0	0	5	84	124	-40	0

=== Group B results ===
5 July 2024 Round 1	Shelmaliers	4-11 - 1-16	Faythe Harriers	Chadwicks Wexford Park
	C Hearne 2-0, P Hearne 0-6, S Keane-Carroll 1-0, J Cash 1-0, L Roche 0-2, G Malone 0-1, A Howlin 0-1, P Connors 0-1.		L Chin 1-7, P Farrell 0-3, C Clancy 0-3, L Cassin 0-1, D Purcell 0-1, L Murphy 0-1.

6 July 2024 Round 1	Cloughbawn	0-14 - 1-18	St Martin's	O'Kennedy Park
	P Whitty 0-8, C Flood 0-2, H Kehoe 0-2, É Doyle 0-1, B Whitty 0-1.		R O'Connor 1-15, D Codd 0-1, C Coleman 0-1, K Firman 0-1.

7 July 2024 Round 1	Oylegate-Glenbrien	3-18 - 0-18	Rapparees	Chadwicks Wexford Park
	S Casey 2-9, S Rowley 1-3, D Reck 0-2, J Reck 0-1, C Heffernan 0-1, J Dunne 0-1, P Doran 0-1.		K Foley 0-7, O Pepper 0-4, D Pepper 0-3, J Kelly 0-2, J Byrne 0-1, A Tobin 0-1.

13 July 2024 Round 2	Oylegate-Glenbrien	0-17 - 1-21	Faythe Harriers	O'Kennedy Park
	S Casey 0-11, P Doran 0-1, F Hourihane 0-1, D Reck 0-1, J Reck 0-1, S Rowley 0-1, J Dunne 0-1.		L Chin 0-12, R Lawlor 1-1, C Clancy 0-4, D Purcell 0-2, L Cassin 0-1, J Shiel 0-1.

13 July 2024 Round 2	Rapparees	0-14 - 2-21	Cloughbawn	O'Kennedy Park
	K Foley 0-4, O Pepper 0-4, R Mahon 0-2, F Murphy 0-1, A Tobin 0-1, L Connolly 0-1, D Pepper 0-1.		C Flood 2-5, P Whitty 0-7, H Kehoe 0-3, E Redmond 0-2, C Kehoe 0-1, E Doyle 0-1, B Carton 0-1, B Whitty 0-1.

14 July 2024 Round 2	St Martin's	0-11 - 1-09	Shelmaliers	McCauley Park
	R O'Connor 0-5, D Codd 0-3, J Barrett 0-1, C Coleman 0-1, K Firman 0-1.		P Hearne 1-3, C Hearne 0-2, C Doyle 0-1, P Connors 0-1, Joe Kelly 0-1, A Howlin 0-1.

2 August 2024 Round 3	Oylegate-Glenbrien	2-16 - 3-10	Cloughbawn	McCauley Park
	S Casey 0-9, J Dunne 2-0, S Rowley 0-4, F Hourihane 0-2, M Kelly 0-1.		H Kehoe 1-4, B Carton 1-0, C Kehoe 1-0, C Flood 0-2, E Doyle 0-2, P Whitty 0-1, B Whitty 0-1.

5 August 2024 Round 3	Rapparees	1-17 - 1-19	Shelmaliers	Chadwicks Wexford Park
	J Kelly 1-1, K Foley 0-4, A Tobin 0-3, D Pepper 0-3, L Connolly 0-2, A Larkin 0-2, O Pepper 0-1, F Murphy 0-1.		P Hearne 0-9, P Connors 1-2, G Malone 0-3, L Roche 0-2, S Keane-Carroll 0-1, C Hearne 0-1, J Kelly 0-1.

5 August 2024 Round 3	St Martin's	0-25 - 2-17	Faythe Harriers	Chadwicks Wexford Park
	R O'Connor 0-14, D Codd 0-4, J Devereux 0-2, C Coleman 0-1, J Firman 0-1, J Barrett 0-1, J O'Connor 0-1, K Firman 0-1.		L Chin 1-11, C Clancy 1-3, J Sheil 0-2, P Farrell 0-1.

23 August 2024 Round 4	Cloughbawn	3-22 - 1-18	Shelmaliers	McCauley Park
	H Kehoe 1-8, B Whitty 1-4, C Flood 0-5, G Murphy 1-0, P Whitty 0-2, C Kehoe 0-1, B Carton 0-1, S Keating 0-1.		P Hearne 0-7, A Howlin 1-1, P Connors 0-2, G Malone 0-2, G Staples 0-1, R Delaney 0-1, R Banville 0-1, M Connors 0-1, J Donoghue 0-1, J Kelly 0-1.

23 August 2024 Round 4	Rapparees	0-15 - 0-18	Faythe Harriers	Chadwicks Wexford Park
	K Foley 0-8, O Pepper 0-2, D Pepper 0-2, T Mahon 0-2, A Larkin 0-1.		L Chin 0-13, C Clancy 0-2, P Farrell 0-2, D Purcell 0-1.

24 August 2024 Round 4	Oylegate-Glenbrien	0-15 - 5-20	St Martin's	Chadwicks Wexford Park
	S Casey 0-12, J Reck 0-1, J Dunne 0-1, D Reck 0-1.		R O'Connor 1-7, D Codd 1-4, J Devereux 1-4, K Firman 1-2, B O'Connor 1-0, J Firman 0-1, B Maddock 0-1, J O'Connor 0-1.

1 September 2024 Round 5	Cloughbawn	0-15 - 0-20	Faythe Harriers	O'Kennedy Park
	H Kehoe 0-11, E Doyle 0-1, P Whitty 0-1, L Flood 0-1, C Kehoe 0-1.		L Chin 0-9, C Clancy 0-6, E Cassin 0-3, J Bridges 0-1, G Murphy-Butler 0-1.

1 September 2024 Round 5	Rapparees	0-17 - 3-21	St Martin's	Chadwicks Wexford Park
	K Foley 0-10, O Pepper 0-3, D McVeigh 0-2, D Pepper 0-1, F Murphy 0-1.		R O'Connor 1-9, J Coleman 1-1, B O'Connor 1-0, C Coleman 0-2, K Firman 0-2, David Codd 0-2, Darren Codd 0-2, Joe O'Connor 0-1, Jack O'Connor 0-1, L Kavanagh 0-1.

1 September 2024 Round 5	Oylegate-Glenbrien	0-13 - 3-19	Shelmaliers	McCauley Park
	S Casey 0-5, S Rowley 0-3, C Hourihane 0-1, D Reck 0-1, J Reck 0-1, S Doran 0-1, C Heffernan 0-1.		S Keane-Carroll 1-4, R Banville 0-7, E Nolan 1-1, C Doyle 1-1, P Connors 0-2, G Malone 0-2, J Kelly 0-1, P Hearne 0-1.

== Knockout stage ==
=== Preliminary quarter-finals ===
20 September 2024 Prelim. QF	Glynn–Barntown	1-07 - 5-25	Faythe Harriers	Chadwicks Wexford Park
	F Cooney 1-1, J Leacy 0-3, K Crean 0-1, C Mahoney 0-1, D Carley 0-1.		L Chin 1-13, C Clancy 1-5, E Cassin 1-2, W Mallon 1-0, J Berry 1-0, R Lawlor 0-3, J Bridges 0-1, D Purcell 0-1.

21 September 2024 Prelim. QF	Ferns St Aidan's	1-24 - 1-21	Oylegate–Glenbrien	Chadwicks Wexford Park
	I Byrne 0-18, E Murphy 1-1, P Morris 0-3, R Scallan 0-1, R Nolan 0-1.		S Casey 0-10, S Rowley 0-4, J Reck 1-0, J White 0-2, C Heffernan 0-1, J Dunne 0-1, P Doran 0-1, J Hennessy 0-1, S Doran 0-1.

22 September 2024 Prelim. QF	Oulart-the Ballagh	2-13 - 4-15	Rapparees	Chadwicks Wexford Park
	B Dunne 2-8, C O'Leary 0-2, A Roche 0-1, S Roche 0-1, M Óg Storey 0-1.		K Foley 2-6, O Pepper 1-3, D Pepper 1-3, R Mahon 0-2, J Kelly 0-1.

22 September 2024 Prelim. QF	Crossabeg–Ballymurn	1-25 - 0-27	Cloughbawn	Chadwicks Wexford Park
	M Byrne 0-16, O Foley 0-4, D McCarthy 1-0, P Foley 0-3, R Devereux 0-1, P Devereux 0-1.		H Kehoe 0-19, B Carton 0-2, C Kehoe 0-2, B Whitty 0-2, S Kehoe 0-1, B Kehoe 0-1.

=== Relegation playoff ===
18 October 2024 Playoff	Oulart-the Ballagh	3-13 - 2-14	Cloughbawn	McAuley Park
	B Dunne 0-7, A McRedmond 1-1, P Sutton 1-1, L Nimmo 1-0, S Murphy 0-1, D Gray 0-1, J Roche 0-1, S Roche 0-1.	Report	H Kehoe 1-4, M Fleming 1-0, B Whitty 0-3, C Flood 0-3, E Doyle 0-2, L Flood 0-1, B Whitty 0-1.

=== Quarter-finals ===
5 October 2024 Quarter-final	Shelmaliers	0-14 - 1-08	Crossabeg–Ballymurn	Chadwicks Wexford Park
	R Banville 0-8, C Hearne 0-2, S Keane-Carroll 0-1, S Donohoe 0-1, C Doyle 0-1, P Connors 0-1.		M Byrne 1-5, O Foley 0-1, N Cullen 0-1, P Foley 0-1.

6 October 2024 Quarter-final	Naomh Éanna	1-17 - 0-19	Faythe Harriers	Chadwicks Wexford Park
	J Cullen 1-7, JJ Twamley 0-3, C McDonald 0-3, C Dunbar 0-2, P Doyle 0-1, J Doran 0-1.		L Chin 0-7, C Clancy 0-3, L Murphy 0-2, W Mallon 0-2, E Cassin 0-2, J Sheil 0-2, K Scallan 0-1.

6 October 2024 Quarter-final	St Martin's	1-20 - 0-14	Ferns St Aidan's	Chadwicks Wexford Park
	R O'Connor 0-10, C Coleman 1-1, Darren Codd 0-3, David Codd 0-1, J Firman 0-1, J Coleman 0-1, B O'Connor 0-1, P O'Connor 0-1, J Devereux 0-1.		I Byrne 0-7, J Dwyer 0-2, C Byrne-Dunbar 0-2, E Murphy 0-1, C Turner 0-1, J Lawlor 0-1.

12 October 2024 Quarter-final	St Anne's Rathangan	0-33 - 1-15	Rapparees	Chadwicks Wexford Park
	K Kennedy 0-12, C Byrne 0-4, J Moran 0-4, L Óg McGovern 0-4, A Moran 0-4, B Kavanagh 0-1, B Rochford 0-1, D O'Keeffe 0-1, L Rochford 0-1, M Furlong 0-1.		O Pepper 0-5, K Foley 0-4, D Pepper 1-0, K Ryan 0-3, O Carty 0-1, R Mahon 0-1, A Murphy 0-1.

=== Semi-finals ===
20 October 2024 Semi-final	St Anne's Rathangan	0-14 - 1-09	Shelmaliers	Chadwicks Wexford Park
	A Rochford 0-4, J Moran 0-2, K Kennedy 0-2, D Furlong 0-2, B Kavanagh 0-1, D O'Keeffe 0-1, C Byrne 0-1, L Óg McGovern 0-1.		R Banville 1-5, C Hearne 0-1, J Kelly 0-1, P Connors 0-1, C O'Shaughnessy 0-1.

20 October 2024 Semi-final	St Martin's	1-18 - 0-10	Naomh Éanna	Chadwicks Wexford Park
	R O'Connor 0-8, B O'Connor 1-0, J O'Connor 0-3, J Firman 0-2, J Barrett 0-1, David Codd 0-1, D Byrne 0-1, K Firman 0-1, Darren Codd 0-1.		J Cullen 0-8, JJ Twamley 0-1, C McDonald 0-1.

=== Final ===
3 November 2024 Final	St Anne's Rathangan	0-19 - 1-22	St Martin's	Chadwicks Wexford Park
	K Kennedy (0-7 frees), M Furlong (0-4, 3 frees), L Rochford (0-3), L Óg McGovern (0-2), D Furlong (0-1), J Moran (0-1), C Byrne (0-1)	Report	R O'Connor (0-11, 7 frees, 1, '65), D Codd (0-3), B O'Connor (1-0), J Barrett (0-2), J Firman (0-2), Jack O'Connor (0-2), K Firman (0-1), B Maddock (0-1)	Referee: J Heffernan (Blackwater)

== Championship statistics ==
=== Top scorers ===
Overall

Rank	Player	Club	Tally	Total	Matches	Average
1	Rory O'Connor	St Martin's	3-79	88	8	11.00
2	Lee Chin	Faythe Harriers	3-72	81	7	11.57
3	Ian Byrne	Ferns St Aidan's	1-67	70	7	10.00
4	Kyle Kennedy	St Anne's Rathangan	2-62	68	8	8.50
5	Billy Dunne	Oulart-the Ballagh	5-48	63	6	10.50
6	Séamus Casey	Oylegate-Glenbrien	2-56	62	6	10.33
7	Harry Kehoe	Cloughbawn	3-51	60	7	8.57
8	Kevin Foley	Rapparees	2-43	49	7	7.00
9	Mark Byrne	Crossabeg–Ballymurn	2-40	46	6	7.66
10	Jack Cullen	Naomh Éanna	1-40	43	7	6.14

Single game

Rank	Player	Club	Tally	Total	Opposition
1	Harry Kehoe	Cloughbawn	0-19	19	Crossabeg-Ballymurn
2	Oisín Foley	Crossabeg-Ballymurn	3-09	18	Oulart-the Ballagh
2	Rory O'Connor	St Martin's	1-15	18	Cloughbawn
2	Ian Byrne	Ferns St Aidan's	0-18	18	Oylegate–Glenbrien
5	Lee Chin	Faythe Harriers	1-13	16	Glynn–Barntown
5	Mark Byrne	Crossabeg–Ballymurn	0-16	16	Cloughbawn
7	Séamus Casey	Oylegate-Glenbrien	2-09	15	Rapparees
7	Billy Dunne	Oulart-the Ballagh	2-09	15	Crossabeg-Ballymurn
9	Lee Chin	Faythe Harriers	1-11	14	St Martin's
9	Rory O'Connor	St Martin's	0-14	14	Faythe Harriers
