= 2023 Wexford Senior Hurling Championship =

Annual hurling competition season

- Dates: 30 June - 20 August 2023
- Teams: 12
- Sponsor: Pettitt's SuperValu
- Champions: Naomh Éanna (2nd title); Conor McDonald (captain); James Quirke (manager)
- Runners-up: Oylegate-Glenbrien; Séamus Casey (captain); Mike Kelly (captain); Des Mythen (manager)
- Relegated: Rathnure

Tournament statistics
- Matches played: 38
- Goals scored: 87 (2.29 per match)
- Points scored: 1298 (34.16 per match)
- Top scorer(s): Séamus Casey (3-71)

The 2023 Wexford Senior Hurling Championship was the 113th staging of the Wexford Senior Hurling Championship since its establishment by the Wexford County Board in 1889. The draw for the group stage places took place on 31 January 2023. The championship ran from 30 June to 20 August 2023.

Ferns St Aidan's entered the championship as the defending champions, however, they were beaten by Oylegate-Glenbrien at the quarter-final stage. Rathnure's relegation ended 82 years of top tier hurling for the club.

The final was played on 20 August 2023 at Chadwick's Wexford Park, between Naomh Éanna and Oylegate-Glenbrien, in what was their first ever meeting in the final. Naomh Éanna won the match by 2-18 to 2-12 to claim their second championship title overall and a first title in five years.

Oylegate-Glenbrien's Séamus Casey was the championship's top scorer with 3-71.

== Team changes ==
=== To Championship ===
Promoted from the Wexford Intermediate Hurling Championship

- Oulart-the Ballagh

=== From Championship ===
Relegated to the Wexford Intermediate Hurling Championship

- Cloughbawn

== Group A ==
=== Group A table ===
Advance to quarter-finals Advance to relegation playoff

Team	Matches				Score			Pts
Team	Pld	W	D	L	For	Against	Diff	Pts
St Anne's Rathangan	5	3	1	1	90	77	13	7
St Martin's	5	3	0	2	116	86	30	6
Naomh Éanna	5	3	0	2	108	96	12	6
Oylegate–Glenbrien	5	2	1	2	95	104	-9	5
Faythe Harriers	5	2	1	2	95	101	-6	5
Glynn–Barntown	5	0	1	4	67	107	-40	1

=== Group A results ===
30 June 2023 Round 1	Glynn-Barntown	0-18 - 0-18	Faythe Harriers	Chadwick's Wexford Park
	J Leacy 0-8, C Cooney 0-2, S Cooney 0-2, F Cooney 0-1, K Crean 0-1, G Dempsey 0-1, D Murphy 0-1, E Kenny 0-1, L Donoghue 0-1.		L Chin 0-12, J Sheil 0-2, C Clancy 0-2, L Murphy 0-1, D Purcell 0-1.

1 July 2023 Round 1	Naomh Éanna	3-15 - 1-16	Oylegate-Glenbrien	McCauley Park
	A Doyle 2-0, P Doyle 0-5, JJ Twamley 1-1, J Cullen 0-3, C McGuckin 0-2, C Dunbar 0-2, G Molly 0-1, C McDonald 0-1.		S Casey 0-9, P Doran 1-0, J White 0-2, C Heffernan 0-1, J Dunne 0-1, D Reck 0-1, C Hourihane 0-1, P Casey 0-1.

1 July 2023 Round 1	St Anne's Rathangan	2-14 - 1-12	St Martin's	McCauley Park
	M Furlong 0-7, A Moran 1-0, K Kennedy 1-0, K Cloney 0-2, L Rochford 0-2, L Óg McGovern 0-2, M Fogarty 0-1.		J Coleman 0-7, J O'Connor 1-2, D Codd 0-1, R O'Connor 0-1, K Firman 0-1.

8 July 2023 Round 2	Faythe Harriers	1-17 - 2-25	Naomh Éanna	McCauley Park
	L Chin 0-9, K Scallan 1-0, C Clancy 0-2, C Heffernan 0-2, R Kehoe 0-1, L Murphy 0-1, J Bridges 0-1, J Berry 0-1.		P Doyle 1-7, C Dunbar 1-2, A Doyle 0-3, J Cullen 0-3, JJ Twamley 0-2, G Molloy 0-2, J Doran 0-2, C McGuckin 0-2, C Ó Tuama 0-1, G Cullen 0-1.

9 July 2023 Round 2	St Anne's Rathangan	0-17 - 1-14	Oylegate-Glenbrien	Chadwick's Wexford Park
	M Furlong 0-13, L Óg McGovern 0-2, A Rochford 0-1, L Rochford 0-1.		S Casey 0-7, P Doran 1-0, M Kelly 0-2, D Reck 0-1, P Rowley 0-1, Jack Reck 0-1, Jamie Reck 0-1, J White 0-1.

9 July 2023 Round 2	St Martin's	3-19 - 0-10	Glynn-Barntown	Chadwick's Wexford Park
	R O'Connor 1-5, K Firman 1-4, J Coleman 0-4, L Kavanagh 1-0, J O'Connor 0-2, D Codd 0-2, J Firman 0-1, D O'Leary 0-1.		J Leacy 0-5, T Gallagher 0-1, C Cooney 0-1, F Cooney 0-1, L Donoghue 0-1, M Fanning 0-1.

14 July 2023 Round 3	St Anne's Rathangan	2-15 - 1-14	Glynn-Barntown	Paddy Roche Centre
	L Óg McGovern 1-2, M Furlong 0-5, J Fogarty 1-0, D O'Keeffe 0-2, L Rochford 0-2, A Kennedy 0-2, A Rochford 0-1, A Moran 0-1.		M Fanning 1-1, J Leacy 0-4, S Cooney 0-2, C Cooney 0-2, L Donoghue 0-2, G Dempsey 0-1, C Mahoney 0-1, R Crosbie 0-1.

15 July 2023 Round 3	Faythe Harriers	0-22 - 1-20	Oylegate-Glenbrien	Chadwick's Wexford Park
	L Chin 0-15, C Clancy 0-3, J Berry 0-2, F Ó Crualaoich 0-1, J Bridges 0-1.		S Casey 0-11, P Doran 1-1, D Reck 0-3, M Kelly 0-2, J Dunne 0-1, F Hourihane 0-1, F Doran 0-1.

15 July 2023 Round 3	St Martin's	2-20 - 0-17	Naomh Éanna	Chadwick's Wexford Park
	J Coleman 1-9, R O'Connor 1-3, D Codd 0-2, K Firman 0-2, D Codd 0-2, J O'Connor 0-1, D O'Leary 0-1.		J Cullen 0-6, P Doyle 0-5, C McDonald 0-3, C McGuckin 0-1, E Conroy 0-1, G Cullen 0-1.

21 July 2023 Round 4	Glynn-Barntown	1-07 - 3-12	Naomh Éanna	McCauley Park
	R White 1-1, C Mahoney 0-3, J Leacy 0-2, M Fanning 0-1.		J Cullen 1-3, P Doyle 1-3, C Dunbar 1-1, J Doran 0-2, C McGuckin 0-1, A Doyle 0-1, C McDonald 0-1.

22 July 2023 Round 4	St Martin's	1-26 - 0-17	Oylegate-Glenbrien	McCauley Park
	J Coleman 0-11, R O'Connor 0-6, L Kavanagh 1-0, J O'Connor 0-3, D Codd 0-2, C Firman 0-1, J O'Connor 0-1, J Barrett 0-1, D Codd 0-1.		S Casey 0-7, J Dunne 0-2, D Reck 0-2, C Heffernan 0-2, P Rowley 0-1, M Kelly 0-1, F Hourihane 0-1, P Doran 0-1.

26 July 2023 Round 4	St Anne's Rathangan	0-11 - 0-13	Faythe Harriers	Chadwick's Wexford Park
	M Furlong 0-5, D O'Keeffe 0-2, A Moran 0-2, D Furlong 0-1, J Fogarty 0-1.		L Chin 0-8, D Purcell 0-2, C Clancy 0-1, C Byrne 0-1, J Sheil 0-1.

30 July 2023 Round 5	st Anne's Rathangan	0-21 - 0-15	Naomh Éanna	McCauley Park
	M Furlong 0-8, L Rochford 0-3, D Furlong 0-3, L Óg McGovern 0-2, J Moran 0-2, B Kavanagh 0-2, D O'Keeffe 0-1.		A Doyle 0-3, P Doyle 0-2, C Dunbar 0-2, J Cullen 0-2, J Doran 0-2, C Ó Tuama 0-1, C McGuckin 0-1, C McDonald 0-1, C Browne 0-1.

30 July 2023 Round 5	St Martin's	2-12 - 1-19	Faythe Harriers	O'Kennedy Park
	J Coleman 1-8, R O'Connor 1-2, K Firman 0-1, P Dempsey 0-1.		L Chin 0-14, L Murphy 1-1, C Heffernan 0-1, J Sheil 0-1, C Clancy 0-1, R Lawlor 0-1.

30 July 2023 Round 5	Glynn-Barntown	1-09 - 1-16	Oylegate-Glenbrien	Chadwick's Wexford Park
	J Leacy 1-1, C Mahoney 0-4, F Cooney 0-2, R Crosbie 0-1, R White 0-1.		S Casey 0-9, P Rowley 1-2, P Doran 0-2, J Dunne 0-1, S Reck 0-1, M Kelly 0-1.

== Group B ==
=== Group B table ===
Advance to quarter-finals Advance to relegation playoff

Team	Matches				Score			Pts
Team	Pld	W	D	L	For	Against	Diff	Pts
Ferns St Aidan's	5	5	0	0	115	97	18	10
Rapparees	5	3	1	1	113	96	17	7
Crossabeg–Ballymurn	5	2	1	2	92	90	2	5
Shelmaliers	5	2	1	2	108	91	17	5
Oulart-the Ballagh	5	1	1	3	105	123	-18	3
Rathnure	5	0	0	5	97	133	0	0

=== Group B results ===
30 June 2023 Round 1	Oulart-the Ballagh	2-10 - 2-10	Crossabeg-Ballymurn	Paddy Roche Centre
	B Dunne (Oulart) 0-5, M Doyle 1-1, D Hayes 1-0, P Sutton 0-3, C O'Leary 0-1.		M Byrne 0-9, O Foley 2-0, P Foley 0-1.

1 July 2023 Round 1	Rapparees	0-25 - 2-12	Rathnure	Chadwick's Wexford Park
	O Pepper 0-8, A Larkin 0-7, K Foley 0-4, R Fox 0-2, A Tobin 0-2, L Connolly 0-2.		J Redmond 0-7, R Higgins 1-1, C O'Connor 1-0, AJ Redmond 0-2, M Redmond 0-1, S Lawlor 0-1.

1 July 2023 Round 1	Shelmaliers	0-18 - 0-20	Ferns St Aidan's	Chadwick's Wexford Park
	P Hearne 0-5, R Banville 0-4, J Kelly 0-4, C Hearne 0-2, S Donohoe 0-2, J Cash 0-1.		I Byrne 0-13, C Byrne-Dunbar 0-2, J Dwyer 0-1, T Dwyer 0-1, D Doyle 0-1, P Breen 0-1, G Bailey 0-1.

8 July 2023 Round 2	Crossabeg-Ballymurn	0-16 - 2-13	Rapparees	Chadwick's Wexford Park
	M Byrne 0-10, P Foley 0-3, J Fortune 0-1, C Devereux 0-1, J Kelly 0-1.		O Pepper 0-6, K Foley 1-1, A Larkin 1-0, A Tobin 0-3, A Roche 0-1, J Kelly 0-1, R Mahon 0-1.

8 July 2023 Round 2	Ferns St Aidan's	2-18 - 0-18	Oulart-the Ballagh	Chadwick's Wexford Park
	I Byrne 1-10, C Turner 1-0, C Byrne-Dunbar 0-2, D Doyle 0-2, P Breen 0-1, E Murphy 0-1, G Bailey 0-1, P Morris 0-1.		B Dunne (Oulart) 0-7, C O'Leary 0-2, L Nimmo 0-2, P Sutton 0-2, J Finn 0-1, M Doyle 0-1, B Dunne (the Ballagh) 0-1, G Sinnott 0-1, R Jacob 0-1.

8 July 2023 Round 2	Shelmaliers	3-19 - 1-15	Rathnure	McCauley Park
	R Banville 0-7, J Kelly 1-4, C Hearne 1-2, A Howlin 1-0, P Hearne 0-2, G Malone 0-1, S Donohoe 0-1, S Keane-Carroll 0-1, J Cash 0-1.		C O'Connor 1-1, J Redmond 0-4, M Redmond 0-3, R Higgins 0-3, E Wickham 0-1, Lawlor 0-1, M Martin 0-1, S O'Connor 0-1.

14 July 2023 Round 3	Ferns St Aidan's	1-15 - 0-16	Rapparees	Monamolin Grounds
	I Byrne 0-7, C Turner 1-0, P Morris 0-2, C Roberts 0-1, G Bailey 0-1, B Jordan 0-1, J Dwyer 0-1, J Breen 0-1, Doyle 0-1.		O Pepper 0-7, R Mahon 0-4, K Foley 0-3, L Ryan 0-1, D McVeigh 0-1.

16 July 2023 Round 3	Shelmaliers	3-19 - 0-17	Oulart-the Ballagh	Chadwick's Wexford Park
	S Keane-Carroll 2-2, R Banville 0-5, C Hearne 0-5, C Doyle 1-1, S Donohoe 0-3, J Kelly 0-2, A Kinsella 0-1.		B Dunne (Oulart) 0-7, M Doyle 0-3, R Jacob 0-3, P Murphy 0-2, L Nimmo 0-1, E Moore 0-1.

16 July 2023 Round 3	Crossabeg-Ballymurn	2-16 - 0-16	Rathnure	Chadwick's Wexford Park
	M Byrne 0-10, B Murphy 2-3, J Kelly 0-1, R Devereux 0-1, S O'Rourke 0-1.		J Redmond 0-9, AJ Redmond 0-3, C O'Connor 0-2, P Whitley 0-1, M Redmond 0-1.

22 July 2023 Round 4	Ferns St Aidan's	2-25 - 2-19	Rathnure	McCauley Park
	I Byrne 1-9, D Doyle 1-4, B Jordan 0-5, J Breen 0-2, N Murphy 0-1, R Scallan 0-1, C Turner 0-1, J Dwyer 0-1, P Morris 0-1.		J Redmond 1-9, S Lawlor 1-3, M Martin 0-2, M Redmond 0-2, R Higgins 0-2, C O'Connor 0-1.

22 July 2023 Round 4	Shelmaliers	0-16 - 1-15	Crossabeg-Ballymurn	Chadwick's Wexford Park
	R Banville 0-4, S Donohoe 0-3, J Kelly 0-2, S Keane-Carroll 0-2, P Hearne 0-2, C Doyle 0-1, L Roche 0-1, A Murphy 0-1.		M Byrne 0-9, B Murphy 1-1, E Kinlough 0-2, O Foley 0-1, R Devereux 0-1, A Butler 0-1.

22 July 2023 Round 4	Oulart-the Ballagh	1-24 - 3-26	Rapparees	Chadwick's Wexford Park
	P Murphy 1-3, R Jacob 0-5, B Dunne (Oulart) 0-4, A Roche 0-2, B Dunne (the Ballagh) 0-2, G Sinnott 0-2, M Doyle 0-2, L Nimmo 0-1, C O'Leary 0-1, P Sutton 0-1, S Murphy 0-1.		O Pepper 0-7, L Connolly 1-3, A Tobin 1-2, K Foley 0-4, R Mahon 0-4, N Doyle 1-0, L Ryan 0-3, A Murphy 0-2, R Fox 0-1.

30 July 2023 Round 5	Shelmaliers	0-18 - 1-15	Rapparees	O'Kennedy Park
	R Banville 0-10, S Keane-Carroll 0-3, C Doyle 0-2, J Kelly 0-2, P Hearne 0-1.		O Pepper 1-9, L Ryan 0-2, D McVeigh 0-1, D Pepper 0-1, J Kelly 0-1, K Foley 0-1.

30 July 2023 Round 5	Ferns St Aidan's	2-17 - 0-20	Crossabeg-Ballymurn	McCauley Park
	I Byrne 1-6, P Morris 0-5, D Doyle 1-1, E Murphy 0-2, J Tonks 0-1, J Dwyer 0-1, B Stafford 0-1.		M Byrne 0-13, O Foley 0-2, P Foley 0-2, C Devereux 0-1, E Kinlough 0-1, J Kelly 0-1.

30 July 2023 Round 5	Oulart-the Ballagh	1-24 - 1-17	Rathnure	Chadwick's Wexford Park
	B Dunne (Oulart) 1-7, L Nimmo 0-8, G Sinnott 0-3, M Doyle 0-2, C O'Leary 0-2, A Roche 0-1, P Sutton 0-1.		J Redmond 0-11, R Higgins 1-1, S Lawlor 0-2, M Martin 0-2, S O'Connor 0-1.

== Knockout stage ==
=== Relegation playoff ===
11 August 2023 Playoff	Glynn-Barntown	3-21 - 1-22	Rathnure	Chadwick's Wexford Park

=== Quarter-finals ===
5 August 2023 Quarter-final	Naomh Éanna	2-19 - 2-15	Rapparees	Chadwick's Wexford Park
	P Doyle 0-6, C Dunbar 1-2, G Molloy 1-0, C McGuckin 0-3, J Cullen 0-3, C McDonald 0-2, T Stafford 0-1, J Doran 0-1, S Óg Whelan 0-1.		O Pepper 0-6, L Connolly 1-1, L Ryan 1-0, K Foley 0-2, D McVeigh 0-2, J Kelly 0-2, B Edwards 0-1, A Larkin 0-1.

5 August 2023 Quarter-final	St Martin's	1-23 - 0-16	Crossabeg-Ballymurn	Chadwick's Wexford Park
	J Coleman 0-12, K Firman 1-2, R O'Connor 0-5, J Firman 0-1, J O'Connor 0-1, L Kavanagh 0-1, D Codd 0-1.		M Byrne 0-9, E Kinlough 0-2, J Kelly 0-1, A Cummins 0-1, O Foley 0-1, B Eviston 0-1, B Murphy 0-1.

6 August 2023 Quarter-final	St Anne's Rathangan	3-26 - 1-29 (aet)	Shelmaliers	Chadwick's Wexford Park
	L Óg McGovern 2-3, D O'Keeffe 0-6, M Fogarty 1-1, L Rochford 0-4, M Furlong 0-3, A Kennedy 0-2, D Furlong 0-2, K Kennedy 0-1, K Breen 0-1, A Moran 0-1, J Moran 0-1, B Kavanagh 0-1.		R Banville 0-15, J Kelly 1-3, C Hearne 0-3, S Keane-Carroll 0-3, P Hearne 0-2, G Malone 0-1, C Doyle 0-1, J Cash 0-1.

6 August 2023 Quarter-final	Oylegate-Glenbrien	1-17 - 0-17	Ferns St Aidan's	Chadwick's Wexford Park
	S Casey 1-9, F Hourihane 0-2, J Dunne 0-2, J Reck 0-2, C Heffernan 0-1, M Kelly 0-1.		I Byrne 0-9, C Byrne-Dunbar 0-2, D Doyle 0-2, C Turner 0-2, J Dwyer 0-1, E Murphy 0-1.

=== Semi-finals ===
13 August 2023 Semi-final	St Martin's	0-15 - 1-14	Naomh Éanna	Chadwick's Wexford Park
	J Coleman (0-8, 7 frees), R O’Connor (0-3); Jack O’Connor (0-2), Joe O’Connor (0-1), K Firman (0-1).	Report	J Cullen (1-6, 1-0 pen., 0-3 frees, 0-1 ’65); C Dunbar (0-3), P Doyle (0-2, 1 free), J Doran (0-1); C Molloy (0-1), A Doyle (0-1).

13 August 2023 Semi-final	St Anne's Rathangan	2-14 - 2-21	Oylegate-Glenbrien	Chadwick's Wexford Park
	M Furlong (2-9, 0-8 frees), L Rochford (0-3), L Óg McGovern (0-1), K Kennedy (0-1).	Report	S Casey (1-12, 0-9 frees), P Doran (1-3), F Hourihane (0-2); C Heffernan (0-2), J Dunne (0-1), P Rowley (0-1).	Referee: B Martin (Ballyhogue)

=== Final ===
20 August 2023 Final	Naomh Éanna	2-18 - 2-12	Oylegate-Glenbrien	Chadwick's Wexford Park
	C McDonald 1-4, J Cullen 0-5 (4fs), P Doyle 1-2 (0-1f), C McGuckin 0-4, C Dunbar 0-2, C Browne 0-1.	Report	S Casey 1-7 (0-5fs, 0-2 65s), P Doran 1-2 (0-2 sls), Jack Reck 0-2, C Heffernan 0-1.	Referee: D Crosby

== Championship statistics ==
=== Top scorers ===
Overall

Rank	Player	County	Tally	Total	Matches	Average
1	Séamus Casey	Oylegate-Glenbrien	3-71	80	8	10.00
2	Joe Coleman	St Martin's	2-59	65	7	9.28
3	Ian Byrne	Ferns St Aidan's	3-54	63	6	10.50
4	Mark Byrne	Crossabeg-Ballymurn	0-60	60	6	10.00
5	Lee Chin	Faythe Harriers	0-58	58	5	11.60
6	Mark Furlong	St Anne's Rathangan	2-50	56	7	8.00
7	Oisín Pepper	Rapparees	1-43	46	6	7.66
8	Ross Banville	Shelmaliers	0-45	45	6	7.50
9	Jack Redmond	Rathnure	1-40	43	5	8.60
10	Pádraig Doyle	Naomh Éanna	3-32	41	8	5.12

Single game

Rank	Player	Club	Tally	Total	Opposition
1	Mark Furlong	St Anne's Rathangan	2-09	15	Oylegate-Glenbrien
1	Séamus Casey	Oylegate-Glenbrien	1-12	15	St Anne's Rathangan
1	Lee Chin	Faythe Harriers	0-15	15	Oylegate-Glenbrien
1	Ross Banville	Shelmaliers	0-15	15	St Anne's Rathangan
5	Lee Chin	Faythe Harriers	0-14	14	St Martin's
6	Ian Byrne	Ferns St Aidan's	1-10	13	Oulart-the Ballagh
6	Mark Furlong	St Anne's Rathangan	0-13	13	Oylegate-Glenbrien
6	Ian Byrne	Ferns St Aidan's	0-13	13	Shelmaliers
6	Mark Byrne	Crossabeg-Ballymurn	0-13	13	Ferns St Aidan's
10	Ian Byrne	Ferns St Aidan's	1-09	12	Rathnure
10	Séamus Casey	Oylegate-Glenbrien	1-09	12	Ferns St Aidan's
10	Jack Redmond	Rathnure	1-09	12	Ferns St Aidan's
10	Oisín Pepper	Rapparees	1-09	12	Shelmaliers
10	Joe Coleman	St Martin's	1-09	12	Naomh Éanna
10	Lee Chin	Faythe Harriers	0-12	12	Glynn-Barntown
