= 2022 Wexford Senior Hurling Championship =

Annual hurling competition season

- Dates: 28 June - August 2022
- Teams: 12
- Sponsor: Pettitt's SuperValu
- Champions: Ferns St Aidan's (1st title); Declan Byrne (captain); Pat Bennett (manager)
- Runners-up: St Martin's; Conor Firman (captain); Daithí Hayes (manager)
- Relegated: Cloughbawn

Tournament statistics
- Matches played: 38
- Goals scored: 91 (2.39 per match)
- Points scored: 1370 (36.05 per match)
- Top scorer(s): Ian Byrne (4-68)

The 2022 Wexford Senior Hurling Championship was the 112th staging of the Wexford Senior Hurling Championship since its establishment by the Wexford County Board in 1889. The championship ran from 28 June to 14 August 2022.

Rapparees entered the championship as the defending champions, however, they were beaten by Ferns St Aidan's in the semi-finals. Oylegate–Glenbrien joined the championship after gaining promotion from the intermediate grade.

The final was played on 14 August 2022 at Chadwick's Wexford Park, between Ferns St Aidan's and St Martin's, in what was their first ever meeting in the final. Ferns St Aidan's won the match by 1–20 to 0–22 to claim their first ever championship title.

Ian Byrne was the championship's top scorer with 4-68.

== Team changes ==
=== To Championship ===
Promoted from the Wexford Intermediate Hurling Championship

- Oylegate–Glenbrien

=== From Championship ===
Relegated to the Wexford Intermediate Hurling Championship

- Oulart–The Ballagh
- Fethard St Mogue's

== Fixtures and results ==
=== Group 1 ===
==== Group 1 table ====
Advance to quarter-finals Advance to relegation playoff

Team	Matches				Score			Pts
Team	Pld	W	D	L	For	Against	Diff	Pts
St Anne's Rathangan	5	3	0	2	130	119	11	6
Naomh Éanna	5	3	0	2	118	112	6	6
Glynn–Barntown	5	3	0	2	111	113	-2	6
Faythe Harriers	5	2	0	3	97	97	0	4
Crossabeg–Ballymurn	5	2	0	3	94	98	-4	4
Cloughbawn	5	2	0	3	103	114	-11	4

==== Group 1 fixtures and results ====
28 June 2022 Round 1	Crossabeg–Ballymurn	2-18 - 3-17	St Anne's Rathangan	Taghmon GAA Grounds
	M Byrne 0-11, O Foley 1-0, A Butler 1-0, B Murphy 0-2, J Fortune 0-2, S O'Rourke 0-1, M O'Connor 0-1.		M Furlong 0-9, L Óg McGovern 2-1, M Fogarty 1-0, D O'Keeffe 0-2, A Kennedy 0-2, A Moran 0-2, J Fogarty 0-1.

28 June 2022 Round 1	Glynn–Barntown	0-19 - 0-15	Faythe Harriers	Paddy Roche Centre
	J Leacy 0-9, R White 0-5, M Doyle 0-2, B Doyle 0-1, S Wilde 0-1, M Joyce 0-1.		L Chin 0-7, R Lawlor 0-2, L Cassin 0-2, R Kehoe 0-1, C Clancy 0-1, G Murphy-Butler 0-1, J Sheil 0-1.

28 June 2022 Round 1	Cloughbawn	0-21 - 3-20	Naomh Éanna	Monamolin GAA Grounds
	B Whitty 0-12, P Whitty 0-3, H Kehoe 0-2, C Flood 0-2, P Cullen 0-2.		P Doyle 0-9, C McDonald 2-1, C Browne 1-0, A Doyle 0-2, J Doran 0-2, C Molloy 0-2, JJ Twamley 0-2, C McGuckin 0-1, E Conroy 0-1.

2 July 2022 Round 2	St Anne's Rathangan	3-17 - 1-18	Cloughbawn	Monamolin GAA Grounds
	M Furlong 1-4, M Fogarty 1-2, A Moran 1-1, L Rochford 0-5, L Óg McGovern 0-4, A Kennedy 0-1.		B Whitty 0-10, P Cullen 1-1, C Flood 0-3, D Kehoe 0-1, J Fleming 0-1, P Whitty 0-1, H Kehoe 0-1.

3 July 2022 Round 2	Naomh Éanna	4-19 - 0-21	Glynn–Barntown	Bellefield GAA Grounds
	C McDonald 2-3, P Doyle 0-6, JJ Twamley 1-1, J Doran 0-4, A Doyle 1-0, C McGuckin 0-2, C Browne 0-2, J Cullen 0-1.		J Leacy 0-12, D Carley 0-2, R White 0-2, D Clarke 0-1, C Doyle 0-1, B Doyle 0-1, S Wilde 0-1, M Doyle 0-1.

3 July 2022 Round 2	Crossabeg–Ballymurn	1-15 - 0-13	Faythe Harriers	Bellefield GAA Grounds
	M Byrne 0-9, B Murphy 1-1, O Foley 0-2, R Devereux 0-1, P Foley 0-1, S O'Rourke 0-1.		L Chin 0-9, C Clancy 0-1, J Berry 0-1, G Murphy-Butler 0-1, C Ó Crualaoich 0-1.

9 July 2022 Round 3	Naomh Éanna	0-24 - 2-16	Faythe Harriers	Bellefield GAA Grounds
	P Doyle 0-7, A Doyle 0-4, C Molloy 0-2, C Browne 0-2, C McDonald 0-2, S Óg Whelan 0-1, McGuckin 0-1, D O'Brien 0-1, C Stokes 0-1, J Cullen 0-1, J Doran 0-1, E Conroy 0-1.		L Chin 0-9, L Murphy 1-2, R Lawlor 1-1, C Clancy 0-2, J Berry 0-1, G Murphy-Butler 0-1.

9 July 2022 Round 3	Crossabeg–Ballymurn	1-11 - 1-19	Cloughbawn	Bellefield GAA Grounds
	M Byrne 0-6, O Foley 1-2, A Butler 0-1, B Eviston 0-1, C Devereux 0-1.		B Whitty 0-8, P Whitty 1-2, H Kehoe 0-3, C Flood 0-2, L Flood 0-2, A Carton 0-1, P Cullen 0-1.

10 July 2022 Round 3	St Anne's Rathangan	1-22 - 1-25	Glynn–Barntown	Chadwick's Wexford Park
	M Furlong 0-12, D O'Brien 1-1, L Rochford 0-2, L Óg McGovern 0-2, A Kennedy 0-2, M Fogarty 0-1, D O'Keeffe 0-1, A Moran 0-1.		J Leacy 0-11, R White 1-4, D Murphy 0-3, M Doyle 0-2, D Carley 0-2, M O'Regan 0-1, S Wilde 0-1, C Cooney 0-1.

16 July 2022 Round 4	Cloughbawn	1-22 - 1-18	Glynn–Barntown	O'Kennedy Park
	B Whitty 0-10, P Whitty 0-5, L Flood 1-0, H Kehoe 0-3, D Kehoe 0-2, S Kehoe 0-1, P Cullen 0-1.		J Leacy 0-10, C Doyle 0-6, R White 1-0, Matt Doyle 0-1, Michael Doyle 0-1.

17 July 2022 Round 4	Crossabeg–Ballymurn	2-15 - 0-15	Naomh Éanna	Bellefield GAA Grounds
	M Byrne 0-9, O Foley 0-4, M O'Connor 1-0, R Devereux 1-0, P Foley 0-1, A Butler 0-1.		P Doyle 0-6, C McDonald 0-2, C McGuckin 0-2, J Cullen 0-1, D O'Brien 0-1, J Doran 0-1, JJ Twamley 0-1, C Molloy 0-1.

17 July 2022 Round 4	St Anne's Rathangan	3-15 - 1-22	Faythe Harriers	Chadwick's Wexford Park
	L Óg McGovern 3-4, M Furlong 0-8, A Moran 0-1, A Kennedy 0-1, D O'Brien 0-1.		L Chin 0-14, R Lawlor 0-4, C Clancy 1-0, L Murphy 0-3, D Purcell 0-1.

24 July 2022 Round 5	St Anne's Rathangan	1-26 - 2-15	Naomh Éanna	Bellefield GAA Grounds
	M Furlong 0-10, A Moran 1-1, A Kennedy 0-4, M Fogarty 0-3, J Fogarty 0-2, L Rochford 0-2, E Ryan 0-1, D O'Keeffe 0-1, B Kavanagh 0-1, A Rochford 0-1.		C McDonald 2-4, J Cullen 0-3, C Browne 0-2, JJ Twamley 0-2, S Óg Whelan 0-1, G Molloy 0-1, A Doyle 0-1, J Doran 0-1.

24 July 2022 Round 5	Crossabeg–Ballymurn	1-14 - 2-16	Glynn–Barntown	Paddy Roche Centre
	M Byrne 0-12, B Murphy 1-0, O Foley 0-1, M O'Connor 0-1.		J Leacy 0-6, R White 1-2, D Murphy 1-0, M Fanning 0-3, D Carley 0-2, B Doyle 0-1, C Doyle 0-1, D Clarke 0-1.

24 July 2022 Round 5	Cloughbawn	1-11 - 0-24	Faythe Harriers	Taghmon GAA Grounds
	B Whitty 0-8, H Kehoe 1-1, C Flood 0-1, C Kehoe 0-1.		L Chin 0-13, L Murphy 0-3, C Clancy 0-2, D Purcell 0-2, R Lawlor 0-2, J Sheil 0-1, C Ó Crualaoich 0-1.

=== Group 2 ===
==== Group 2 table ====
Advance to quarter-finals Advance to relegation playoff

Team	Matches				Score			Pts
Team	Pld	W	D	L	For	Against	Diff	Pts
Rapparees	5	4	0	1	109	91	18	8
Ferns St Aidan's	5	3	1	1	122	110	12	7
Shelmaliers	5	3	0	2	121	110	11	6
St Martin's	5	2	1	2	109	109	0	5
Oylegate–Glenbrien	5	2	0	3	107	124	-17	4
Rathnure	5	0	0	5	95	124	-29	0

==== Group 2 fixtures and results ====
28 June 2022 Round 1	Rathnure	1-11 - 1-19	Rapparees	O'Kennedy Park
	S O'Connor 1-4, J Redmond 0-5, AJ Redmond 0-2.		K Foley 0-9, R Mahon 1-5, K Ryan 0-2, D Pepper 0-2, R Fox 0-1.

28 June 2022 Round 1	Shelmaliers	3-15 - 1-16	St Martin's	Bellefield GAA Grounds
	R Banville 1-9, D O'Neill 1-0, A Murphy 1-0, S Keane-Carroll 0-2, J Kelly 0-2, C Hearne 0-1, P Hearne 0-1.		J O'Connor 0-8, M Coleman 1-0, K Firman 0-3, D Waters 0-1, M Maloney 0-1, L Kavanagh 0-1, D Codd 0-1, C Kelly 0-1.

28 June 2022 Round 1	Ferns St Aidan's	1-17 - 0-11	Oylegate–Glenbrien	St Patrick's Park
	I Byrne 0-8, D Doyle 1-1, P Morris 0-3, B Jordan 0-2, C Byrne-Dunbar 0-2, R Nolan 0-1, J Dwyer 0-1.		S Casey 0-2, J Reck 0-2, F Doran 0-2, B Dunne 0-2, J White 0-1, P Doran 0-1, J Reck 0-1.

2 July 2022 Round 2	Rathnure	1-15 - 0-20	St Martin's	O'Kennedy Park
	J Redmond 0-7, C O'Connor 1-0, M Redmond 0-3, S Lawlor 0-1, S O'Connor 0-1, O Lennon 0-1, P Whiteley 0-1, AJ Redmond 0-1.		J Coleman 0-10, J O'Connor 0-3, J Barrett 0-2, L Kavanagh 0-2, D Codd 0-1, W Devereux 0-1, M Coleman 0-1.

2 July 2022 Round 2	Oylegate–Glenbrien	1-19 - 0-19	Shelmaliers	Monamolin GAA Grounds
	P Doran 1-2, B Dunne 0-4, M Kelly 0-3, S Casey 0-3, D Reck 0-2, J Reck 0-1, P Cullen 0-1, J White 0-1, A Duggan 0-1, P Rowley 0-1.		P Hearne 0-9, S Donoghue 0-3, A Murphy 0-2, C Doyle 0-2, A Howlin 0-1, E Doyle 0-1, J Kelly 0-1.

3 July 2022 Round 2	Rapparees	1-16 - 2-16	Ferns St Aidan's	Páirc Uí Shíocháin
	R Mahon 0-8, K Foley 1-2, R Fox 0-2, J Kelly 0-2, J Peare 0-1, B Edwards 0-1.		I Byrne 1-11, C O'Connor 1-0, J Lawlor 0-1, J Tonks 0-1, C Roberts 0-1, C Turner 0-1, P Morris 0-1.

8 July 2022 Round 3	Rapparees	2-18 - 1-19	Shelmaliers	Chadwick's Wexford Park
	R Mahon 0-4, L Connolly 1-0, D Redmond 1-0, O Pepper 0-3, K Ryan 0-2, A Tobin 0-2, B Edwards 0-2, K Foley 0-2, L Ryan 0-1, J Peare 0-1, D Pepper 0-1.		J Kelly 1-4, P Hearne 0-6, S Keane-Carroll 0-3, C Hearne 0-2, C Walsh 0-1, J Donohoe 0-1, G Malone 0-1, C O'Shaughnessy 0-1.

9 July 2022 Round 3	Oylegate–Glenbrien	1-12 - 1-22	St Martin's	O'Kennedy Park
	S Casey 0-5, J Reck 1-1, P Rowley 0-2, P Doran 0-2, D Reck 0-1, F Doran 0-1.		J Coleman 0-12, J O'Connor 1-4, P Dempsey 0-2, J Barrett 0-1, C Firman 0-1, L Kavanagh 0-1, K Firman 0-1.

9 July 2022 Round 3	Rathnure	2-19 - 2-25	Ferns St Aidan's	O'Kennedy Park
	J Redmond 0-10, M Redmond 1-4, S Lawlor 1-2, AJ Redmond 0-1, E Boggan 0-1, M Martin 0-1.		C Byrne-Dunbar 2-6, I Byrne 0-6, P Morris 0-4, J Dwyer 0-3, D Doyle 0-2, C Turner 0-2, C Scallan 0-1, C O'Connor 0-1.

15 July 2022 Round 4	Rapparees	1-24 - 0-20	St Martin's	Chadwick's Wexford Park
	R Mahon 0-12, N Doyle 1-0, K Foley 0-3, J Peare 0-3, R Fox 0-2, J Kelly 0-1, O Pepper 0-1, D Pepper 0-1, A Murphy 0-1.		J Coleman 0-7, L Kavanagh 0-3, J O'Connor 0-3, J Firman 0-2, K Firman 0-2, J Devereux 0-1, M Maloney 0-1, M Coleman 0-1.

16 July 2022 Round 4	Rathnure	1-16 - 4-15	Oylegate–Glenbrien	O'Kennedy Park
	AJ Redmond 0-7, S Lawlor 1-2, M O'Connor 0-2, J Redmond 0-2, A Redmond 0-1, S O'Connor 0-1, M Redmond 0-1.		S Casey 1-6, Jamie Reck 0-4, P Cullen 1-0, P Rowley 1-0, M Kavanagh 1-0, Jack Reck 0-2, P Casey 0-1, J White 0-1, B Dunne 0-1.

17 July 2022 Round 4	Ferns St Aidan's	3-15 - 1-27	Shelmaliers	Bellefield GAA Grounds
	I Byrne 1-10, D Doyle 2-0, B Jordan 0-2, C Turner 0-1, C Byrne-Dunbar 0-1, P Breen 0-1.		P Hearne 0-9, J Kelly 0-6, S Donohie 0-5, C Hearne 1-1, R Banville 0-4, E Doyle 0-1, A Cash 0-1.

24 July 2022 Round 5	Rapparees	0-17 - 0-13	Oylegate–Glenbrien	Monamolin GAA Grounds
	R Mahon 0-7, O Pepper 0-3, K Ryan 0-3, A Tobin 0-2, D Pepper 0-1, J Kelly 0-1.		S Casey 0-9, B Dunne 0-1, Jamie Reck 0-1, D Reck 0-1, Jack Reck 0-1.

24 July 2022 Round 5	Rathnure	2-13 - 2-18	Shelmaliers	Chadwick's Wexford Park
	J Redmond 0-9, S Lawlor 2-1, E Wickham 0-2, M O'Connor 0-1.		P Hearne 2-6, J Kelly 0-4, R Banville 0-4, J Cash 0-1, C Hearne 0-1, G Staples 0-1, C Doyle 0-1.

24 July 2022 Round 5	Ferns St Aidan's	3-16 - 2-19	St Martin's	O'Kennedy Park
	I Byrne 2-9, C O'Connor 1-1, D Doyle 0-3, B Jordan 0-2, J Dwyer 0-1.		J Coleman 0-7, K Firman 1-3, J O'Connor 0-4, M Coleman 1-0, J Barrett 0-1, L Kavanagh 0-1, D Codd 0-1, J Devereux 0-1, Z Firman 0-1.

=== Knockout stage ===
==== Relegation playoff ====
5 August 2022 Playoff	Cloughbawn	0-20 - 2-20	Rathnure	Chadwick's Wexford Park
	B Whitty (0-9, 6 frees), C Flood (0-5), H Kehoe (0-4), B Kehoe (0-1), P Whitty (0-1).	Report	S O’Connor (1-7), J Redmond (0-10, 6 frees, 1 ’65), M Redmond (1-0); M O’Connor (0-1), S Lawlor (0-1); C O’Connor (0-1).	Referee: J Owens (Askamore)

==== Quarter-finals ====
30 July 2022 Quarter-final	St Anne's Rathangan	2-23 - 0-29 (aet); Penalties: 1-2	St Martin's	Chadwick's Wexford Park
	M Furlong 1-15, L Óg McGovern 0-4, J Fogarty 1-0, M Fogarty 0-2, L Rochford 0-1, D O'Brien 0-1.		J Coleman 0-15, K Firman 0-3, J Firman 0-2, J O'Connor 0-2, J Barrett 0-1, D Codd 0-1, M Maloney 0-1, M Coleman 0-1, J Devereux 0-1, A Maddock 0-1, W Devereux 0-1.

30 July 2022 Quarter-final	Naomh Éanna	1-13 - 0-13	Shelmaliers	Chadwick's Wexford Park
	P Doyle 1-3, J Cullen 0-4, A Doyle 0-2, J Doran 0-1, JJ Twamley 0-1, C McGuckin 0-1, E Conroy 0-1.		P Hearne 0-6, R Banville 0-2, J Kelly 0-2, C Doyle 0-1, G Malone 0-1, A Murphy 0-1.

31 July 2022 Quarter-final	Faythe Harriers	1-16 - 2-14	Rapparees	Chadwick's Wexford Park
	L Chin 1-9, L Murphy 0-4, C Heffernan 0-1, C Ó Crualaoich 0-1, J Shiel 0-1.		R Mahon 0-7, N Doyle 2-0, O Pepper 0-2, K Foley 0-2, B Edwards 0-1, R Fox 0-1, J Kelly 0-1.

1 August 2022 Quarter-final	Glynn–Barntown	1-14 - 2-18	Ferns St Aidan's	Chadwick's Wexford Park
	R White 1-1, J Leacy 0-4, G Moore 0-3, M Doyle 0-2, T Doyle 0-1, M Fanning 0-1, B Doyle 0-1, M Doyle 0-1.		I Byrne 0-7, J Dwyer 1-2, T Dwyer 1-0, B Jordan 0-3, P Morris 0-2, C Byrne-Dunbar 0-1, C O'Connor 0-1, C Scallan 0-1, D Doyle 0-1.

==== Semi-finals ====
7 August 2022 Semi-final	St Martin's	0-20 - 0-15	Naomh Éanna	Chadwick's Wexford Park
	J Coleman (0-7, 6 frees), K Firman (0-6), A Maddock (0-2), M Maloney (0-1), J Firman (0-1); J O’Connor (0-1), M Coleman (0-1); J Devereux (0-1).	Report	P Doyle (0-9, 7 frees, 1 ’65), C Molloy (0-2), A Doyle (0-2), J Doran (0-1), J Cullen (0-1 free).	Referee: G McGrath (St. James's)

7 August 2022 Semi-final	Rapparees	0-25 - 1-23 (aet)	Ferns St Aidan's	Chadwick's Wexford Park
	R Mahon (0-9, 6 frees, 1 ’65); D Pepper (0-5), K Foley (0-3); L Ryan (0-2), L Connolly (0-2), A Roche (0-1), R Fox (0-1), O Pepper (0-1), A Murphy (0-1).	Report	I Byrne (0-12, 9 frees), J Breen (1-1), C Byrne-Dunbar (0-3), P Morris (0-3), D Doyle (0-2), C Roberts (0-1), C Turner (0-1).	Referee: B Redmond (Na Fianna)

==== Final ====
14 August 2022 Final	St Martin's	0-22 - 1-20	Ferns St Aidan's	Chadwick's Wexford Park
	J Coleman (0-10, 7 frees, 0-2 65s); K Firman (0-5); J Firman (0-2); J Barrett, L Kavanagh, A Maddock, M Coleman, J Devereux (0-1 each).	Report	I Byrne (0-5, 0-4 frees); C Byrne-Dunbar (0-4);P Breen (1-0); P Morris (1 free), J Dwyer (1 sideline cut) (0-3 each); D Doyle (0-2); J Tonks, B Jordan, C O'Connor (0-1 each)	Referee: E Furlong (Rapparees)

== Championship statistics ==
=== Top scorers ===
Overall

Rank	Player	Club	Tally	Total	Matches	Average
1	Ian Byrne	Ferns St Aidan's	4-68	80	8	10.00
2	Joe Coleman	St Martin's	0-68	68	7	9.71
3	Mark Furlong	St Anne's Rathangan	2-58	64	6	10.66
4	Lee Chin	Faythe Harriers	1-61	64	6	10.66
5	Bob Whitty	Cloughbawn	0-57	57	6	9.50
6	Ryan Mahon	Rapparees	1-52	55	7	7.85
7	John Leacy	Glynn–Barntown	0-52	52	6	8.66
8	Mark Byrne	Crossabeg–Ballymurn	0-47	47	5	9.40
9	Paul Hearne	Shelmaliers	2-37	43	6	7.16
9	Pádraig Doyle	Naomh Éanna	1-40	43	7	6.14
9	Jack Redmond	Rathnure	0-43	43	6	7.16

In a single game

Rank	Player	Club	Tally	Total	Opposition
1	Mark Furlong	St Anne's Rathangan	1-15	18	St Martin's
2	Ian Byrne	Ferns St Aidan's	2-09	15	St Martin's
3	Ian Byrne	Ferns St Aidan's	1-11	14	Rapparees
3	Lee Chin	Faythe Harriers	0-14	14	St Anne's Rathangan
3	Joe Coleman	St Martin's	0-15	15	St Anne's Rathangan
6	Liam Óg McGovern	St Anne's Rathangan	3-04	13	Faythe Harriers
6	Ian Byrne	Ferns St Aidan's	1-10	13	Shelmaliers
6	Lee Chin	Faythe Harriers	0-13	13	Cloughbawn
9	Corey Byrne-Dunbar	Ferns St Aidan's	2-06	12	Rathnure
9	Paul Hearne	Shelmaliers	2-06	12	Rathnure
9	Lee Chin	Faythe Harriers	1-09	12	Rapparees
9	Ross Banville	Shelmaliers	1-09	12	St Martin's
9	Ian Byrne	Ferns St Aidan's	0-12	12	Rapparees
9	Bob Whitty	Cloughbawn	0-12	12	Naomh Éanna
9	John Leacy	Glynn–Barntown	0-12	12	Naomh Éanna
9	Mark Furlong	St Anne's Rathangan	0-12	12	Glynn–Barntown
9	Mark Byrne	Crossabeg–Ballymurn	0-12	12	Glynn–Barntown
9	Joe Coleman	St Martin's	0-12	12	Oylegate–Glenbrien
9	Ryan Mahon	Rapparees	0-12	12	St Martin's

=== Miscellaneous ===
- Ferns St Aidan's win their first ever senior title.
