= 2021 Wexford Senior Hurling Championship =

Annual hurling competition season

- Dates: 6 August - 19 September 2021
- Teams: 13
- Sponsor: Pettitt's SuperValu
- Champions: Rapparees (2nd title); Kevin Foley (captain); Declan Ruth (manager)
- Runners-up: St Anne's Rathangan; Aidan Rochford (captain); David O'Connor (manager)
- Relegated: Oulart–The Ballagh; Fethard St Mogue's

Tournament statistics
- Matches played: 29
- Goals scored: 84 (2.9 per match)
- Points scored: 1025 (35.34 per match)
- Top scorer(s): Diarmuid O'Keeffe (2-53)

The 2021 Wexford Senior Hurling Championship was the 111th staging of the Wexford Senior Hurling Championship since its establishment by the Wexford County Board in 1889. The championship began on 6 August 2021 and ended on 19 September 2021.

Shelmaliers entered the championship as the defending champions; however, they were beaten by St Anne's Rathangan at the semi-final stage. Crossabeg–Ballymurn joined the championship after gaining promotion from the intermediate grade. Oulart–The Ballagh and Fethard St Mogue's were relegated from the championship.

The final was played on 19 September 2021 at Chadwick's Wexford Park, between Rapparees and St Anne's Rathangan, in what was their first ever meeting in a final. Rapparees won the match by 6–18 to 1–18 to claim their second championship title overall and a first title since 1978.

St Anne's Rathangan player Diarmuid O'Keeffe was the championship's top scorer with 2-53.

== Results ==
=== Group A ===
==== Group A table ====
Advance to knockout stage

Team	Matches				Score			Pts
Team	Pld	W	D	L	For	Against	Diff	Pts
Shelmaliers	3	3	0	0	77	60	17	6
Cloughbawn	3	2	0	1	61	68	3	4
St Anne's Rathangan	3	1	0	2	65	69	-4	2
Crossabeg–Ballymurn	3	0	0	3	54	70	-16	0

==== Group A results ====
7 August 2021 Round 1	Shelmaliers	2-16 - 1-18	Cloughbawn	Chadwick's Wexford Park
	R Banville 0-6, P Hearne 1-0, S Keane-Carroll 1-0, J Kelly 0-2, G Malone 0-2, K Roche 0-2, C Hearne 0-2, E Doyle 0-1, J Cash 0-1.		H Kehoe 1-4, B Whitty 0-7, C Flood 0-2, P Whitty 0-2, C Kehoe 0-1, L Flood 0-1, E Doyle 0-1.

8 August 2021 Round 1	Crossabeg–Ballymurn	2-15 - 2-17	St Anne's Rathangan	Chadwick's Wexford Park
	P Foley 0-7, M Byrne 1-2, R Devereux 1-1, O Foley 0-2, N Murphy 0-2, E Kehoe 0-1.		D O'Keeffe 0-10, M Fogarty 1-0, D Furlong 1-0, J Fogarty 0-2, L Rochford 0-2, D O'Brien 0-1, A Kennedy 0-1, L Óg McGovern 0-1.

14 August 2021 Round 2	St Anne's Rathangan	0-20 - 3-14	Shelmaliers	Chadwick's Wexford Park
	D O'Keeffe 0-10, M Fogarty 0-2, M Furlong 0-2, J Fogarty 0-2,		R Banville 1-8, P Hearne 2-0, J Kelly 0-2, C Hearne 0-1, S Donohoe 0-1, G Malone 0-1, S Keane-Carroll 0-1.

15 August 2021 Round 2	Cloughbawn	0-15 - 0-14	Crossabeg–Ballymurn	Chadwick's Wexford Park
	B Whitty 0-10, H Kehoe 0-2, C Flood 0-1, E Doyle 0-1, P Whitty 0-1.		N Murphy 0-6, P Foley 0-3, O Foley 0-1, E Kehoe 0-1, B Roche 0-1, C Devereux 0-1, B Eviston 0-1.

21 August 2021 Round 3	Cloughbawn	0-25 - 2-16	St Anne's Rathangan	Chadwick's Wexford Park
	B Whitty 0-12, C Flood 0-4, H Kehoe 0-4, L Flood 0-2, P Whitty 0-2, C Kehoe 0-1.		D O'Keeffe 1-5, L Óg McGovern 0-5, A Rochford 1-0, D O'Brien 0-3, M Furlong 0-1, L Rochford 0-1, B Kavanagh 0-1.

22 August 2021 Round 3	Shelmaliers	3-23 - 2-13	Crossabeg–Ballymurn	Chadwick's Wexford Park
	R Banville 0-9, S Keane-Carroll 2-1, J Kelly 0-5, P Hearne 1-0, G Malone 0-3, C Walsh 0-2, C Hearne 0-1, J Cash 0-1, J Donohoe 0-1.		E Kehoe 1-1, B Roche 1-0, O Foley 0-3, P Foley 0-3, N Murphy 0-3, C Devereux 0-1, M Byrne 0-1, B Murphy 0-1.

=== Group B ===
==== Group B table ====
Advance to knockout stage

Team	Matches				Score			Pts
Team	Pld	W	D	L	For	Against	Diff	Pts
Rathnure	2	1	0	1	39	36	3	2
Oulart–The Ballagh	2	1	0	1	43	43	0	2
Faythe Harriers	2	1	0	1	35	38	-3	0

==== Group B fixtures ====
7 August 2021 Round 1	Oulart–The Ballagh	2-13 - 2-17	Faythe Harriers	Chadwick's Wexford Park
	B Dunne 1-8, G Sinnott 1-0, M Óg Storey 0-2, C O'Leary 0-1, D Buggy 0-1, M Doyle 0-1.		L Chin 0-7, R Lawlor 2-0, G Murphy-Butler 0-3, J Sheil 0-2, C Heffernan 0-1, J Berry 0-1, J Bridges 0-1, W Mallon 0-1, C Ó Crualaoich 0-1.

13 August 2021 Round 2	Rathnure	1-17 - 2-18	Oulart–The Ballagh	Chadwick's Wexford Park
	S O'Connor 1-5, AJ Redmond 0-8, J Redmond 0-2, C O'Connor 0-1, S Lawlor 0-1.		M Óg Storey 2-0, B Dunne 0-6, N Kirwan 0-3, M Doyle 0-3, D Gray 0-2, D Buggy 0-1, K Sheridan 0-1, S Murphy 0-1, C O'Leary 0-1.

20 August 2021 Round 3	Faythe Harriers	0-12 - 1-16	Rathnure	Chadwick's Wexford Park
	L Chin 0-8, J Bridges 0-1, E Roche 0-1, K Scallan 0-1, P Farrell 0-1.		J Redmond 0-8, S Lawlor 0-5, J Tobin 1-0, S O'Connor 0-2, R Higgins 0-1.

=== Group C ===
==== Group C table ====
Advance to knockout stage

Team	Matches				Score			Pts
Team	Pld	W	D	L	For	Against	Diff	Pts
Rapparees	2	1	1	0	44	39	5	3
Naomh Éanna	2	1	0	1	50	45	5	2
Fethard St Mogue's	2	0	1	1	43	53	-10	0

==== Group C fixtures ====
8 August 2021 Round 1	Rapparees	1-20 - 2-12	Naomh Éanna	Chadwick's Wexford Park
	R Mahon 0-8, K Foley 1-2, O pepper 0-2, A Tobin 0-2, L Connolly 0-1, T Mahon 0-1, L Ryan 0-1, D Redmond 0-1, B Edwards 0-1, R Fox 0-1.		P Doyle 0-6, C McDonald 1-2, JJ Twamley 1-0, D Hughes 0-3, C Dunbar 0-1.

15 August 2021 Round 2	St Mogue's	1-19 - 4-20	Naomh Éanna	Chadwick's Wexford Park
	C Byrne 0-10, C Dwyer 1-1, G Foley 0-3, B Power 0-2, J Tubritt 0-1, M Dwyer 0-1, J Sutton 0-1.		C McDonald 3-3, P Doyle 0-9, C Dunbar 1-2, J Cullen 0-2, A Doyle 0-1, G Molloy 0-1, C McGuckin 0-1, D Hughes 0-1.

21 August 2021 Round 3	Rapparees	3-12 - 1-18	St Mogue's	Chadwick's Wexford Park
	R Mahon 0-8, L Connolly 2-0, K Foley 1-2, T Mahon 0-2.		C Byrne 0-10, M Dwyer 1-2, B Power 0-3, C Dwyer 0-2, G Foley 0-1.

=== Group D ===
==== Group D table ====
Advance to knockout stage

Team	Matches				Score			Pts
Team	Pld	W	D	L	For	Against	Diff	Pts
Glynn–Barntown	2	2	0	0	37	28	9	4
Ferns St Aidan's	2	1	0	1	40	42	-2	2
St Martin's	2	0	0	2	37	44	-7	0

==== Group D fixtures ====
6 August 2021 Round 1	Glynn–Barntown	0-19 - 0-13	St Martin's	Chadwick's Wexford Park
	J Leacy 0-8, M Fanning 0-4, S Wilde 0-3, G Moore 0-2, C Doyle 0-1, G Dempsey 0-1.		J Coleman 0-9, Jack O'Connor 0-1, R O'Connor 0-1, C Firman 0-1, C Coleman 0-1.

13 August 2021 Round 2	Ferns St Aidan's	0-15 - 1-15	Glynn–Barntown	Chadwick's Wexford Park
	P Morris 0-10, C Turner 0-2, J Tonks 0-1, D Doyle 0-1, T Dwyer 0-1.		M Fanning 0-8, J Leacy 1-4, M Joyce 0-1, F Cooney 0-1, S Wilde 0-1.

22 August 2021 Round 3	St Martin's	3-15 - 3-16	Ferns St Aidan's	Chadwick's Wexford Park
	J Coleman 0-8, C Coleman 1-0, M Coleman 1-0, C Lyng 1-0, R O'Connor 0-3, Jack O'Connor 0-2, D O'Leary 0-1, Joe O'Connor 0-1.		I Byrne 0-9, C Byrne-Dunbar 2-2, D Doyle 1-2, B Jordan 0-3.

=== Knockout stage ===
==== Preliminary quarter-finals ====
28 August 2021 Preliminary quarter-final	Oulart–The Ballagh	1-15 - 3-21	St Anne's Rathangan	Chadwick's Wexford Park
	S Murphy 1-3, D Buggy 0-3, G Sinnott 0-2, B Dunne 0-2, C O'Leary 0-2, M Óg Storey 0-1, N Kirwan 0-1, I Storey 0-1.		D O'Keeffe 0-7, M Furlong 1-3, J Fogarty 1-3, L Óg McGovern 0-4, M Fogarty 1-0, L Rochford 0-3, D O'Brien 0-1.

28 August 2021 Preliminary quarter-final	Ferns St Aidan's	2-29 - 1-30 (aet)	Fethard St Mogues	Chadwick's Wexford Park
	I Byrne 1-13, C O'Connor 1-3, D Doyle 0-3, C Byrne-Dunbar 0-3, J Dwyer 0-2, C Turner 0-2, T Dwyer 0-1, J Tonks 0-1, J Breen 0-1.		C Byrne 1-13, M Dwyer 0-6, C Dwyer 0-3, G Foley 0-3, J Tubritt 0-2, A Swan 0-1, D Whelan 0-1, J Sutton 0-1.

29 August 2021 Preliminary quarter-final	Cloughbawn	1-16 - 2-22	Faythe Harriers	Chadwick's Wexford Park
	B Whitty 0-12, E Doyle 1-0, L Flood 0-1, P Whitty 0-1, C Flood 0-1, L Flood 0-1.		L Chin 0-12, P Farrell 2-0, G Murphy-Butler 0-3, C Ó Crualaoich 0-3, J Bridges 0-2, E Roche 0-1, C Clancy 0-1.

29 August 2021 Preliminary quarter-final	Naomh Éanna	2-25 - 1-28 (aet); Penalties: 2-1	St Martin's	Chadwick's Wexford Park
	D Hughes 1-10, A Doyle 1-2, J Doran 0-4, J Cullen 0-4, C Dunbar 0-2, C McDonald 0-2, R Hayes 0-1.		J Coleman 0-12, Jack O'Connor 0-8, L Kavanagh 1-1, R O'Connor 0-2, B Maddock 0-1, C Coleman 0-1, J Firman 0-1, D Waters 0-1, D Codd 0-1.

==== Relegation playoffs ====
5 September 2021 Round 1	Crossabeg–Ballymurn	1-09 - 2-19	Cloughbawn	O'Kennedy Park
	N Murphy 0-4, P Foley 1-0, M Byrne 0-2, O Foley 0-2, B Murphy 0-1.		B Whitty 0-9, C Flood 1-2, P Whitty 1-1, H Kehoe 0-3, S Keating 0-2, P Cullen 0-1, A Carton 0-1.

11 September 2021 Round 2	St Martin's	1-26 - 0-16	Oulart–The Ballagh	Chadwick's Wexford Park
	Jack O'Connor 0-9, J Coleman 0-6, M Coleman 1-0, Joe O'Connor 0-3, R O'Connor 0-3, J Firman 0-2, B Maddock 0-1, L Kavanagh 0-1, C Coleman 0-1.		B Dunne 0-9, C O'Leary 0-2, S Murphy 0-1, N Redmond 0-1, J Roche 0-1, T Dunne 0-1, G Sinnott 0-1.

11 September 2021 Round 2	Fethard St Mogue's	1-15 - 1-16	Crossabeg–Ballymurn	Chadwick's Wexford Park
	C Byrne 0-7, M Dwyer 0-5, G O'Grady 1-0, M Wallace 0-2, C Dwyer 0-1.		O Foley 1-5, N Murphy 0-7, E Kehoe 0-1, M Byrne 0-1, P Foley 0-1, B Murphy 0-1.

==== Quarter-finals ====
4 September 2021 Quarter-final	Glynn–Barntown	1-22 - 1-17	Faythe Harriers	Chadwick's Wexford Park
	J Leacy (0-9, 6 frees), M Fanning (1-2, 1-0 pen, 2 frees); R White (0-3), M Doyle (0-3); F Cooney (0-2), M Joyce (0-1), G Moore (0-1); M Joyce (0-1).	Report	J Bridges (0-4); J Sheil (1-0), C Clancy (0-3), J Gordon (0-3 frees), W Mallon (0-2); J Berry (0-2, 1 free), K Scallan (0-1), L Chin (0-1), G Murphy-Butler (0-1).

4 September 2021 Quarter-final	Rapparees	2-21 - 1-21	Ferns St Aidan's	Chadwick's Wexford Park
	O Pepper (1-2), A Tobin (1-2); R Mahon (0-5, 4 frees), L Connolly (0-4), K Foley (0-3, 1 line ball), J Kelly (0-2), B Edwards (0-1); J Peare (0-1), T Mahon (0-1 free).	Report	D Doyle (1-2), I Byrne (0-5 frees), P Morris (0-4), B Jordan (0-3), C Byrne-Dunbar (0-2), C Turner (0-2); J Dwyer (0-1), C O’Connor (0-1), G Bailey (0-1).

5 September 2021 Quarter-final	Rathnure	1-12 - 3-19	St Anne's Rathangan	Chadwick's Wexford Park
	J Redmond 0-5, C O'Connor 1-0, S Lawlor 0-2, O Lennon 0-2, AJ Redmond 0-1, S O'Connor 0-1, R Higgins 0-1.		L Óg McGovern 2-2, D O'Keeffe 0-6, D O'Brien 1-1, L Rochford 0-4, M Furlong 0-4, D Furlong 0-1, J Fogarty 0-1.

5 September 2021 Quarter-final	Shelmaliers	1-20 - 0-16	Naomh Éanna	Chadwick's Wexford Park
	R Banville 0-9, C Hearne 1-1, J Donohoe 0-2, P Hearne 0-2, A Murphy 0-1, A Doyle 0-1, G Malone 0-1, B Malone 0-1, S Keane-Carroll 0-1, S Donohoe 0-1.		D Hughes 0-8, J Doran 0-3, P Doyle 0-1, C McGuckin 0-1, J Cullen 0-1, A Doyle 0-1, C Dunbar 0-1.

==== Semi-finals ====
12 September 2021 Semi-final	Glynn–Barntown	1-14 - 2-15	Rapparees	Chadwick's Wexford Park
	M Joyce (1-2), John Leacy (0-4, 3 frees, 1 ’65), Craig Doyle (0-3); Gary Moore (0-2, 1 line ball), Fionn Cooney (0-1), Rowan White (0-1), Shane Wilde (0-1).	Report	K Foley (1-2, 1-0 pen), R Mahon (0-4 frees), L Connolly (1-0), T Mahon (0-3, 2 frees), L Ryan (0-2), R Fox (0-2), A Roche (0-1); N Doyle (0-1).

12 September 2021 Semi-final	Shelmaliers	1-16 - 2-19	St Anne's Rathangan	Chadwick's Wexford Park
	R Banville (0-8, 6 frees), C Hearne (1-0); P Hearne (0-3), G Malone (0-2), S Keane-Carroll (0-1), J Kelly (0-1), C O’Shaughnessy (0-1).	Report	D O’Keeffe (0-10, 9 frees), J Fogarty (1-2), P O’Keeffe (1-0), L Óg McGovern (0-2), M Furlong (0-2); D Furlong (0-2), L Rochford (0-1).	Referee: B Redmond (Na Fianna Clonard)

==== Final ====
19 September 2021 Final	Rapparees	6-18 - 1-17	St Anne's Rathangan	Chadwick's Wexford Park
	L Connolly 2-1; A Tobin 1-3; R Fox 1-2; O Pepper, J Kelly 1-1 each; T Mahon (3f), K Foley, R Mahon (2f) 0-3 each; N Doyle 0-1.	Report	D O’Keeffe 1-5 (4f, 1-0pen); D O’Brien 0-4; M Furlong 0-3; D Furlong, L Rochford 0-2 each; L McGovern 0-1.	Referee: J Owens (Kilrush/Askamore)

== Championship statistics ==
=== Top scorers ===
Overall

Rank	Player	Club	Tally	Total	Matches	Average
1	Diarmuid O'Keeffe	St Anne's Rathangan	2-53	59	7	8.42
2	Bob Whitty	Cloughbawn	0-50	50	5	10.00
3	Cian Byrne	Fethard St Mogue's	1-40	43	4	10.75
3	Ross Banville	Shelmaliers	1-40	43	5	8.00
5	Joe Coleman	St Martin's	0-35	35	4	8.75
6	Ian Byrne	Ferns St Aidan's	1-30	30	3	10.00
7	Billy Dunne	Oulart–The Ballagh	1-25	28	4	7.00
7	Ryan Mahon	Rapparees	0-28	28	5	5.60
7	Lee Chin	Faythe Harriers	0-28	28	4	7.00
10	Darragh Hughes	Naomh Éanna	1-22	25	4	6.25

In a single game

Rank	Player	Club	Tally	Total	Opposition
1	Ian Byrne	Ferns St Aidan's	1-13	16	Fethard St Mogue's
1	Cian Byrne	Fethard St Mogue's	1-13	16	Ferns St Aidan's
3	Darragh Hughes	Naomh Éanna	1-10	13	St Martin's
3	Conor McDonald	Naomh Éanna	3-03	12	Fethard St Mogue's
3	Bob Whitty	Cloughbawn	0-12	12	St Anne's Rathangan
3	Bob Whitty	Cloughbawn	0-12	12	Faythe Harriers
3	Lee Chin	Faythe Harriers	0-12	12	Cloughbawn
3	Joe Coleman	St Martin's	0-12	12	Naomh Éanna
9	Ross Banville	Shelmaliers	1-08	11	St Anne's Rathangan
9	Billy Dunne	Oulart–The Ballagh	1-08	11	Faythe Harriers

=== Miscellaneous ===
- Thirteen time winners Oulart–The Ballagh are relegated after 36-years at senior level.
