= 2020 Wexford Senior Hurling Championship =

Annual hurling competition season

- Dates: 17 July 2020 - 23 August 2020
- Teams: 12
- Sponsor: Pettitt's SuperValu
- Champions: Shelmaliers (2nd title); Simon Donohoe (captain); Vinny Parker (manager)
- Runners-up: Naomh Éanna; Brendan Travers (captain); Louis Cullen (manager)

Tournament statistics
- Matches played: 19
- Goals scored: 52 (2.74 per match)
- Points scored: 602 (31.68 per match)
- Top scorer(s): Ross Banville (2-38)

The 2020 Wexford Senior Hurling Championship was the 110th staging of the Wexford Senior Hurling Championship since its establishment by the Wexford County Board in 1889. The original championship draw took place on 17 February 2020; however, due to the impact of the COVID-19 pandemic on Gaelic games, the draws for a rescheduled championship took place on 22 June 2020 with a new format being adopted. The championship eventually began on 17 July 2020 and ended on 23 August 2020.

St Martin's were the defending champions; however, they were beaten by Glynn–Barntown at the quarter-final stage.

On 23 August 2020, Shelmaliers won the championship after a 3–18 to 3–11 win over Naomh Éanna in the final. This was their second championship title overall and their first title since 2014.

== Revised format ==
The championship originally featured two groups of six team but was redrawn to consist of four groups of three teams. The redrawn groups were decided by an open draw. Relegation for the 2020 season will be abolished.

== Team changes ==
=== To Championship ===
Promoted from the Wexford Intermediate Hurling Championship

- Cloughbawn

=== From Championship ===
Relegated to the Wexford Intermediate Hurling Championship

- Oylegate–Glenbrien

== Results ==
=== Group A ===
==== Group A table ====
Advance to quarter-finals

Team	Matches				Score			Pts
Team	Pld	W	D	L	For	Against	Diff	Pts
St Martin's	2	2	0	0	5-42	3-31	17	4
Oulart–The Ballagh	2	1	0	1	6-30	6-32	-2	2
Cloughbawn	2	0	0	2	1-28	3-37	-15	0

==== Group A fixtures ====
17 July 2020 Round 1	St Martin's	5-19 - 3-16	Oulart–The Ballagh	Chadwicks Wexford Park
	Jack O'Connor 2-9, J Firman 3-2, R O'Connor 0-3, D Codd 0-2, C Lyng 0-2, P O'Connor 0-1.		B Dunne 1-9, T Storey 1-1, P Sutton 0-4, M Óg Storey 1-0, D Gray 0-1, E Moore 0-1.

24 July 2020 Round 2	Cloughbawn	0-15 - 0-23	St Martin's	Bellefield Road
	B Whitty 0-7, H Kehoe 0-5, C Flood 0-2, B Carton 0-1.		Jack O'Connor 0-13, R O'Connor 0-4, J Firman 0-2, C Lyng 0-2, J Coleman 0-1, C Coleman 0-1.

31 July 2020 Round 3	Cloughbawn	1-13 - 3-14	Oulart–The Ballagh	Bellefield Road
	B Whitty 0-7, H Kehoe 0-4, E Doyle 1-0, S Keating 0-1, C Kehoe 0-1.		B Dunne 0-8, P Sutton 2-1, M Doyle 1-2, K Sheridan 0-2, T Storey 0-1.

=== Group B ===
==== Group B table ====
Advance to quarter-finals

Team	Matches				Score			Pts
Team	Pld	W	D	L	For	Against	Diff	Pts
Faythe Harriers	2	2	0	0	3-25	0-27	7	4
Fern's St Aidan's	2	1	0	1	0-37	3-26	2	2
Fethard St Mogue's	2	0	0	2	1-26	1-35	-9	0

==== Group B fixtures ====
18 July 2020 Round 1	Ferns St Aidan's	0-16 - 2-11	Faythe Harriers	Bellefield Road
	P Morris 0-8, I Byrne 0-3, C Turner 0-2, G Bailey 0-2, C Roberts 0-1.		L Chin 1-9, G Murphy-Butler 1-0, C Clancy 0-1, J Shiel 0-1.

25 July 2020 Round 2	Fethard St Mogue's	1-15 - 0-21	Ferns St Aidan's	Chadwicks Wexford Park
	G O'Grady 0-7, M Dwyer 1-3, C Dwyer 0-4, J Foley 0-1.		P Morris 0-7, I Byrne 0-4, B Jordan 0-4, C O'Connor 0-2, E Murphy 0-1, J Dwyer 0-1, T Dwyer 0-1, J Tonks 0-1.

31 July 2020 Round 3	Faythe Harriers	1-14 - 0-11	Fethard St Mogue's	Chadwicks Wexford Park
	L Chin 0-8, C Clancy 1-2, G Murphy-Butler 0-2, J Shiell 0-1, E Kavanagh 0-1.		M Wallace 0-5, G O'Grady 0-2, B Power 0-2, M O'Dwyer 0-1, G Foley 0-1.

=== Group C ===
==== Group C table ====
Advance to quarter-finals

Team	Matches				Score			Pts
Team	Pld	W	D	L	For	Against	Diff	Pts
St Anne's Rathangan	2	2	0	0	3-42	4-36	3	4
Glynn–Barntown	2	1	0	1	2-38	3-33	2	2
Rathnure	2	0	0	2	4-33	2-44	-5	0

==== Group C fixtures ====
17 July 2020 Round 1	St Anne's Rathangan	1-25 - 3-17	Rathnure	Bellefield Road
	D O'Keeffe 0-15, D Furlong 1-0, L Óg McGovern 0-3, J Fogarty 0-2, A Rochford 0-2, M Furlong 0-2, L Rochford 0-1.		C O'Connor 0-6, S Lawlor 1-2, S O'Connor 0-4, B Quigley 1-0, M Redmond 1-0, R Higgins 0-3, AJ Redmond 0-1, E Higgins 0-1.

25 July 2020 Round 2	Glynn–Barntown	1-19 - 2-17	St Anne's Rathangan	Chadwicks Wexford Park
	G Moore 1-4, J Leacy 0-6, M Fanning 0-3, M Joyce 0-2, D Clarke 0-2, C Mahony 0-1, R White 0-1.		M Furlong 1-5, D O'Keeffe 0-8, M Fogarty 1-0, L Óg McGovern 0-2, J Fogarty 0-1, D Furlong 0-1.

1 August 2020 Round 3	Rathnure	1-16 - 1-19	Glynn–Barntown	Chadwicks Wexford Park
	C O'Connor 1-4, S Lawlor 0-3, R Higgins 0-3, AJ Redmond 0-2, S O'Connor 0-2, C O'Connor 0-1, M Redmond 0-1.		J Leacy 0-5, R White 0-5, M Fanning 1-0, G Moore 0-3, B Doyle 0-2, C Mahony 0-2, M Doyle 0-1, M Joyce 0-1.

=== Group D ===
==== Group D table ====
Advance to quarter-finals

Team	Matches				Score			Pts
Team	Pld	W	D	L	For	Against	Diff	Pts
Naomh Éanna	2	2	0	0	4-24	2-28	2	4
Shelmaliers	2	1	0	1	4-26	4-22	4	2
Rapparees	2	0	0	2	2-25	4-25	-6	0

==== Group D fixtures ====
18 July 2020 Round 1	Rapparees	2-09 - 2-14	Shelmaliers	Chadwicks Wexford Park
	K Foley 0-6, N Doyle 1-0, K Ryan 1-0, L Connolly 0-1, D Pepper 0-1, O Carty 0-1.		R Banville 0-10, J Cash 1-0, J Kelly 1-0, C Hearne 0-2, J Donohoe 0-1, C Keane-Carroll 0-1.

24 July 2020 Round 2	Naomh Éanna	2-11 - 0-16	Rapparees	Chadwicks Wexford Park
	P Doyle 0-6, C McDonald 1-2, D Hughes 1-1, J Cullen 0-2.		K Foley 0-10, A Tobin 0-2, D Pepper 0-2, J Peare 0-1, L Connolly 0-1.

1 August 2020 Round 3	Shelmaliers	2-12 - 2-13	Naomh Éanna	Bellefield Road
	R Banville 1-5, C Hearne 1-1, J Kelly 0-2, J Cash 0-1, S Keane-Carroll 0-1, D O'Neill 0-1, K Roche 0-1.		P Doyle 0-6, C McGuckin 1-1, C Dunbar 1-0, D Hughes 0-3, A Doyle 0-1, G Molloy 0-1, C McDonald 0-1.

=== Knock-out stage ===
==== Quarter-finals ====
7 August 2020 Quarter-final	St Martin's	1-11 - 0-20	Glynn–Barntown	Chadwicks Wexford Park
	Jack O'Connor (0-6 frees), L Kavanagh (1-1); J Firman (0-2), J Coleman (0-1), C Lyng (0-1).	Report	J Leacy (0-11, 9 frees), C Mahoney (0-5), G Moore (0-2), M Joyce (0-1), R White (0-1).

8 August 2020 Quarter-final	Naomh Éanna	1-17 - 0-13	Fern's St Aidan's	Chadwicks Wexford Park
	P Doyle (0-9, 8 frees, 1 '65), A Doyle (1-1), C McDonald (0-2), J Cullen (0-2, 1 free); B Travers (0-1), E Conroy (0-1); C McGuckin (0-1).	Report	P Morris (0-5, 3 frees), I Byrne (0-3, 2 frees); D Doyle (0-2), G Bailey (0-1); B Jordan (0-1), D Byrne (0-1).

9 August 2020 Quarter-final	Faythe Harriers	1-12 - 0-22	Shelmaliers	Chadwicks Wexford Park
	L Chin 0-8 (7f); R Lawlor 1-0; W Mallon 0-2; R Kehoe, C Clancy 0-1 each.	Report	R Banville 0-7 (6f); J Kelly (3f), J Cash, S Keane Carroll 0-3 each; J Donohoe, C Hearne, 0-2 each; S Donohoe, C Walsh 0-1 each.

9 August 2020 Quarter-final	St Anne's Rathangan	1-12 - 2-15	Oulart–The Ballagh	Chadwicks Wexford Park
	D O'Keeffe (0-8, 7 frees); J Fogarty (1-1), M Fogarty (0-1), D Furlong (0-1), L Og McGovern (0-1).	Report	N Kirwan (2-1), B Dunne (0-7 frees); G Sinnott (0-2), K Sheridan (0-2); J Roche (0-1), M Og Storey (0-1), T Dunne (0-1).

==== Semi-finals ====
16 August 2020 Semi-final	Oulart–The Ballagh	1-19 - 1-20	Naomh Éanna	Chadwicks Wexford Park
	B Dunne (0-8, 7 frees, 1, 65); G Sinnott (1-3), P Sutton (0-2), M Doyle (0-2), M Óg Storey (0-1), C O'Leary (0-1); J Roche (0-1); D Gray (0-1).	Report	P Doyle (0-8, 5 frees), G Molloy (1-0); C McDonald (0-3), C Dunbar (0-3), J Cullen (0-2); D Hughes (0-2), S Doyle (0-1), C Molloy (0-1);

16 August 2020 Semi-final	Glynn–Barntown	0-16 - 3-20	Shelmaliers	Chadwicks Wexford Park
	J Leacy 0-5 (5f), C Mahoney, R White 0-3 each; M Doyle, G Moore (1 sl) 0-2 each; M Joyce 0-1.	Report	R Banville 0-8 (5fs, 1 ’65), J Kelly 1-2; S Keane Carroll, J Cash 1-1 each; J Donohoe 0-2; A Cash, E Doyle, G Malone, A Murphy, C Hearne, C Walsh 0-1 each.

==== Final ====
23 August 2020 Final	Naomh Éanna	3-11 - 3-18	Shelmaliers	Chadwicks Wexford Park
	P Doyle (0-7, 5 frees); C Dunbar, C Molloy, G Molloy (1-0 each); D Hughes (0-2); C McDonald, G Cullen (0-1 each).	Report	R Banville (1-8, 1-0 penalty, 3 frees, 1 65); J Cash, S Keane-Carroll (1-1 each); C Hearne, J Donohue (0-2 each); G Malone, E Doyle, C O’Shaughnessy, E Nolan (0-1 each).	Referee: B Redmond (Na Fianna, Clonard)

== Championship statistics ==
=== Top scorers ===
Overall

Rank	Player	Club	Tally	Total	Matches	Average
1	Ross Banville	Shelmaliers	2-38	44	5	8.80
2	Pádraig Doyle	Naomh Éanna	0-36	36	5	7.20
3	Billy Dunne	Oulart–The Ballagh	1-32	35	4	8.75
4	Jack O'Connor	St Martin's	2-28	34	3	11.33
5	Diarmuid O'Keeffe	St Anne's Rathangan	0-31	31	3	10.33
6	Lee Chin	Faythe Harriers	1-25	28	3	9.33
7	John Leacy	Glynn–Barntown	0-27	27	4	6.75
8	Paul Morris	Ferns St Aidan's	0-20	20	3	6.66
9	Kevin Foley	Rapparees	0-16	16	2	8.00
10	Conor Firman	St Martin's	3-06	15	3	5.00
10	James Cash	Shelmaliers	3-06	15	5	3.00

In a single game

Rank	Player	Club	Tally	Total	Opposition
1	Jack O'Connor	St Martin's	2-09	15	Oulart–The Ballagh
1	Diarmuid O'Keeffe	St Anne's Rathangan	0-15	15	Rathnure
3	Jack O'Connor	St Martin's	0-13	13	Cloughbawn
4	Billy Dunne	Oulart–The Ballagh	1-09	12	St Martin's
4	Lee Chin	Faythe Harriers	1-09	12	Ferns St Aidan's
6	Ross Banville	Shelmaliers	1-08	11	Naomh Éanna
6	John Leacy	Glynn–Barntown	0-11	11	St Martin's
8	Ross Banville	Shelmaliers	0-10	10	Rapparees
8	Kevin Foley	Rapparees	0-10	10	Naomh Éanna
10	Pádraig Doyle	Naomh Éanna	0-09	9	Ferns St Aidan's
