= 2019 Wexford Senior Hurling Championship =

Annual hurling competition season

- Dates: 12 April 2019 – 27 October 2019
- Teams: 12
- Sponsor: Pettitt's SuperValu
- Champions: St Martin's (4th title); Willie Devereux (captain); Paudie Kelly (captain)
- Runners-up: St Anne's Rathangan; Liam Rochford (captain)
- Relegated: Oylegate–Glenbrien

Tournament statistics
- Matches played: 38
- Goals scored: 97 (2.55 per match)
- Points scored: 1173 (30.87 per match)

The 2019 Wexford Senior Hurling Championship was the 109th staging of the Wexford Senior Hurling Championship since its establishment by the Wexford County Board in 1889. The championship began on 12 April 2019 and ended on 27 October 2019.

Naomh Éanna were the defending champions; however, they were defeated by Ferns St Aidan's at the quarter-final stage.

On 27 October 2019, St Martin's won the championship after a 1–15 to 1–12 defeat of St Anne's Rathangan in the final at Innovate Wexford Park. This was their fourth championship title overall and their first title since 2017.

== Team changes ==
=== To Championship ===
Promoted from the Wexford Intermediate Hurling Championship

- Fethard St Mogue's

=== From Championship ===
Relegated to the Wexford Intermediate Hurling Championship

- Buffers Alley

== Results ==
=== Group A ===
==== Table ====
Relegation play-off

Team	Matches				Score			Pts
Team	Pld	W	D	L	For	Against	Diff	Pts
Rapparees	5	4	0	1	114	93	21	8
St Martin's	5	3	1	1	133	93	40	7
Ferns St Aidan's	5	3	1	1	92	89	3	7
St Anne's Rathangan	5	1	1	3	97	126	-29	3
Fethard St Mogue's	5	1	1	3	85	101	-16	3
Faythe Harriers	5	0	2	3	86	105	-19	2

==== Group A results ====
13 April 2019 Round 1	Faythe Harriers	0-12 - 0-12	Fethard St Mogue's

13 April 2019 Round 1	Rapparees	1-18 - 1-11	Ferns St Aidan's

13 April 2019 Round 1	St Anne's Rathangan	0-12 - 8-22	St Martin's

20 April 2019 Round 2	Fethard St Mogue's	1-16 - 3-13	Rapparees

20 April 2019 Round 2	St Martin's	3-19 - 1-17	Faythe Harriers

21 April 2019 Round 2	St Anne's Rathangan	1-14 - 1-16	Ferns St Aidan's

10 August 2019 Round 3	St Martin's	2-15 - 2-13	Rapparees

10 August 2019 Round 3	Fethard St Mogue's	2-09 - 0-18	Ferns St Aidan's

11 August 2019 Round 3	St Anne's Rathangan	0-18 - 1-15	Faythe Harriers

16 August 2019 Round 4	St Martin's	1-14 - 0-17	Ferns St Aidan's

17 August 2019 Round 4	Faythe Harriers	1-14 - 2-17	Rapparees

17 August 2019 Round 4	St Anne's Rathangan	4-16 - 1-11	Fethard St Mogue's

8 September 2019 Round 5	St Anne's Rathangan	2-16 - 5-14	Rapparees

8 September 2019 Round 5	Faythe Harriers	1-16 - 2-18	Ferns St Aidan's

8 September 2019 Round 5	St Martin's	2-15 - 3-16	Fethard St Mogue's

=== Group B ===
==== Table ====
Relegation play-off

Team	Matches				Score			Pts
Team	Pld	W	D	L	For	Against	Diff	Pts
Shelmaliers	5	3	2	0	94	87	7	8
Naomh Éanna	5	3	1	1	133	93	40	7
Glynn–Barntown	5	1	3	1	83	82	1	5
Rathnure	5	1	2	2	100	97	3	4
Oulart–The Ballagh	5	1	2	2	101	103	-2	4
Oylegate–Glenbrien	5	1	0	4	97	114	-17	2

==== Group B results ====
12 April 2019 Round 1	Oylegate–Glenbrien	2-19 - 2-18	Oulart–The Ballagh

12 April 2019 Round 1	Rathnure	0-17 - 1-15	Naomh Éanna

13 April 2019 Round 1	Glynn–Barntown	0-14 - 1-11	Shelmaliers

20 April 2019 Round 2	Rathnure	1-23 - 2-20	Oulart–The Ballagh

20 April 2019 Round 2	Naomh Éanna	2-19 - 0-19	Glynn–Barntown

21 April 2019 Round 2	Shelmaliers	2-19 - 1-19	Oylegate–Glenbrien

10 August 2019 Round 3	Naomh Éanna	2-16 - 2-13	Oylegate–Glenbrien

10 August 2019 Round 3	Rathnure	1-14 - 0-17	Glynn–Barntown

11 August 2019 Round 3	Shelmaliers	0-20 - 0-17	Oulart–The Ballagh

16 August 2019 Round 4	Naomh Éanna	1-16 - 1-18	Oulart–The Ballagh

17 August 2019 Round 4	Glynn–Barntown	1-17 - 0-13	Oylegate–Glenbrien

17 August 2019 Round 4	Rathnure	0-17 - 0-18	Shelmaliers

7 September 2019 Round 5	Rathnure	3-14 - 2-12	Oylegate–Glenbrien

7 September 2019 Round 5	Glynn–Barntown	0-13 - 0-13	Oulart–The Ballagh

7 September 2019 Round 5	Naomh Éanna	2-11 - 0-17	Shelmaliers

=== Knock-out stage ===
==== Relegation play-off ====
21 September 2019 Play-off	Faythe Harriers	1-15 - 0-07	Oylegate–Glenbrien	Bellefield
	L Chin 0-10, E Roche 1-0, W Mallon 0-2, C Clancy 0-2, P Murphy 0-1.		S Casey 0-6, D Reck 0-1.

==== Quarter-finals ====
21 September 2019 Quarter-final	St Martin's	2-19 - 1-19	Glynn–Barntown	Innovate Wexford Park
	J Coleman 0-8, C Lyng 1-0, R O'Connor 0-3, D Codd 0-2, H O'Connor 0-2, Jack O'Connor 0-1, B Maddock 0-1, J Firman 0-1, M Coleman 0-1.		G Moore 0-8, M Fanning 0-4, S Wilde 1-0, M Doyle 0-2, B Doyle 0-2, F Cooney 0-2, R White 0-1.

21 September 2019 Quarter-final	Ferns St Aidan's	1-21 - 0-12	Naomh Éanna	Innovate Wexford Park
	I Byrne 0-9, J Dwyer 1-1, B Jordan 0-4, P Morris 0-3, P O'Toole 0-1, E Murphy 0-1, T Dwyer 0-1, N Murphy 0-1.		P Doyle 0-7, C McDonald 0-2, D O'Brien 0-1, J Cullen 0-1, C Dunbar 0-1.

28 September 2019 Quarter-final	Rapparees	2-14 - 1-16	Rathnure	Innovate Wexford Park
	K Ryan 0-6, K Foley 1-1, N Doyle 1-0, J Kelly 0-2, T Mahon 0-2, D Pepper 0-1, L Connolly 0-1, R Mahon 0-1.		C O'Connor 1-9, S Lawlor 0-4, R Higgins 0-1, M Boland 0-1, R Flynn 0-1.

6 October 2019 Quarter-final	St Anne's Rathangan	2-11 - 0-15	Shelmaliers	Innovate Wexford Park
	D O'Keeffe 0-5, J Fogarty 1-1, D Furlong 1-0, L Óg McGovern 0-2, K Whelan 0-1, L Rochford 0-1, M Furlong 0-1.		B Barron 0-7, R Banville 0-2, E Nolan 0-2, J Kelly 0-2, B Malone 0-1, C Hearne 0-1.

==== Semi-finals ====
12 October 2019 Semi-final	Rapparees	0-14 - 2-14	St Anne's Rathangan	Innovate Wexford Park
	T Mahon 0-7, K Ryan 0-4, B Edwards 0-1, R Mahon 0-1, A Tobin 0-1.		D O'Keeffe 0-8, A Rochford 1-2, M Furlong 1-1, R Barry 0-1, L Rochford 0-1, L Óg McGovern 0-1.

12 October 2019 Semi-final	Ferns St Aidan's	1-15 - 2-16	St Martin's	Innovate Wexford Park
	I Byrne 0-8, C Turner 1-0, J Dwyer 0-2, C O'Connor 0-2, C Scallan 0-1, J Tonks 0-1, P Morris 0-1.		J Coleman 0-9, J Firman 1-1, D Codd 1-0, Jack O'Connor 0-2, R O'Connor 0-1, H O'Connor 0-1, M Coleman 0-1, C Lyng 0-1.

==== Final ====
27 October 2019 Final	St Martin's	1-15 - 1-13	St Anne's Rathangan	Innovate Wexford Park
	J Firman (1-2), J Coleman (0-6, 5 frees); J O'Connor (0-2), M Coleman (0-2), D Codd (0-2), C Lyng (0-1).	Report	D O'Keeffe (0-11, 8 frees, 2 '65s), A Rochford (1-0); D Furlong (0-1), M Fogarty (0-1).	Attendance: 5,956; Referee: D Crosby (Kilmore)

== Championship statistics ==
=== Miscellaneous ===
- The Rapparees–Rathnure and St Anne's Rathangan–Shelmaliers quarter-final double-header scheduled for Innovate Wexford Park on 22 September 2019 were postponed due a waterlogged pitch.
