= Corey Byrne Dunbar =

Irish hurler

Personal information
- Native name: Corey Broin Ó Dunbharra (Irish)
- Born: 2003 (age 22–23) Ferns; County Wexford, Ireland

Sport
- Sport: Hurling
- Position: Midfield
Club
- Years: Club
- 2021-present: Ferns St Aidan's
Club titles
- Wexford titles: 1
Inter-county
- Years: County
- 2022-present: Wexford
Inter-county titles
- Leinster titles: 0
- All-Irelands: 0
- NHL: 0
- All Stars: 0

Corey Byrne Dunbar (born 2003) is an Irish hurler. At club level he plays with Ferns St Aidan's and at inter-county level with the Wexford senior hurling team.

== Career ==
Byrne Dunbar first played hurling to a high standard as a student at St Mary's CBS in Enniscorthy. He also represented the school in boxing and played underage soccer with Bray Wanderers and Wexford F.C. At club level, Byrne Dunbar joined Ferns St Aidan's at juvenile and underage levels, before eventually progressing to the club's senior team. He won a Wexford SHC medal after a 1–20 to 0–22 defeat of St Martin's in the 2022 final.

Byrne Dunbar first appeared on the inter-county scene with Wexford as a member of the minor team in 2020. He later spent three successive seasons with the under-20 team, however, his underage career ended without success. Byrne Dunbar first played for the senior team during the 2022 National Hurling League.

== Honours ==
Ferns St Aidan's

- Wexford Senior Hurling Championship: 2022

Wexford

- Walsh Cup: 2024
