= Seamus Casey =

Seamus Casey may refer to:

- Séamus Casey (hurler)
- Seamus Casey (ice hockey)
