= 2018 Wexford Senior Hurling Championship =

Annual hurling competition season

- Dates: 20 April 2018 – 21 October 2018
- Sponsor: Pettitts
- Champions: Naomh Éanna (1st title); Brendan Travers (captain); Louis Cullen (manager)
- Runners-up: St Martin's
- Relegated: Buffers Alley

The 2018 Wexford Senior Hurling Championship was the 116th staging of the Wexford Senior Hurling Championship since its establishment by the Wexford County Board in 1889. The championship began on 20 April 2018 and ended on 21 October 2018.

St Martin's were the defending champions.

On 21 October 2018, Naomh Éanna won the title following a 2–11 to 0–13 defeat of St Martin's in the final at Innovate Wexford Park. It was their first ever championship title.

== Results ==
=== Relegation play-off ===
22 September 2018 Relegation play-off	Buffers Alley	0-08 - 2-12	Glynn–Barntown	Bellefield

=== Quarter-finals ===
22 September 2018 Quarter-final	St Martin's	2-18 - 2-11	Ferns St Aidan's	Innovate Wexford Park, Wexford

22 September 2018 Quarter-final	Rapparees	2-18 - 1-14	Rathnure	Innovate Wexford Park, Wexford

23 September 2018 Quarter-final	Shelmaliers	2-12 - 3-12	Oylegate–Glenbrien	Innovate Wexford Park, Wexford

23 September 2018 Quarter-final	St Anne's Rathangan	3-11 - 4-17	Naomh Éanna	Innovate Wexford Park, Wexford

=== Semi-finals ===
7 October 2018 Semi-final	Naomh Éanna	3-14 - 4-07	Oylegate–Glenbrien	Innovate Wexford Park, Wexford
				Referee: J Heffernan

7 October 2018 Semi-final	St Martin's	5-15 - 0-14	Rapparees	Innovate Wexford Park, Wexford

==== Final ====
21 October 2018 Final	Naomh Éanna	2-11 - 0-13	St Martin's	Innovate Wexford Park, Wexford
	C Dunbar 1-4, C McDonald 1-1, P Doyle 0-4 (1f); D Hughes 0-2 (2f).	Report	Jack O'Connor 0-4 (3f), C Lyng 0-3 (2f), R O'Connor 0-2; M Codd, Joe O'Connor, J Firman, H O'Connor 0-1 each.	Referee: G McGrath (St. James's)
