= Podge Doran =

Irish hurler

Personal information
- Native name: Padraig Ó Deoradháin (Irish)
- Nickname: Podge
- Born: 10 August 1992 (age 34) Wexford, Ireland
- Occupation: Student

Sport
- Sport: Hurling
- Position: Centre forward
Club
- Years: Club
- 2009-: Oylegate
Club titles
	Football	Hurling
Wexford titles	0	0
Inter-county
- Years: County
- 2013-: Wexford
Inter-county titles
- Leinster titles: 0
- All-Irelands: 0
- NHL: 0
- All Stars: 0

Paudie "Podge" Doran (born 10 August 1992) is an Irish hurler who plays as a right corner-forward for the Wexford senior team.

== Playing career ==
=== Minor and under-21 ===
Doran enjoyed playing for both grades since he made his debut in 2009 but the years proved little success as he was faced by defeats in the hands of Kilkenny and Dublin.

=== Senior ===
Doran made his senior debut on 8 June 2013 in the Leinster Quarter-Final against Dublin at a very sunny soaked Wexford Park as a sub with the game being quite one sided during the first period the game ended level. The replay was played in Parnell Park the weekend after but proved little success for Doran and Wexford as they suffered a defeat.
