= Ger Cushe =

Irish hurler (born 1967)

Personal information
- Native name: Gearóid Mac Coise (Irish)
- Born: 3 March 1967 (age 59) Gorey, County Wexford, Ireland
- Occupation: Sales rep
- Height: 6 ft 1 in (185 cm)

Sport
- Sport: Hurling
- Position: Full-back
Club
- Years: Club
- Naomh Éanna
Club titles
- Wexford titles: 0
Inter-county
- Years: County
- 1991-1999: Wexford
Inter-county titles
- Leinster titles: 2
- All-Irelands: 1
- NHL: 0
- All Stars: 0

Ger Cushe (born 3 March 1967) is an Irish hurling coach and former player. At club level, he played with Naomh Éanna and at inter-county level was a member of the Wexford senior hurling team.

== Playing career ==
Cushe first played hurling to a high standard at club level with Naomh Éanna in Gorey. He captained the club to the Wexford IHC title in 1990 following a defeat of Shelmaliers in the final. Cushe claimed a second IHC medal in 2001 when Rathgarogue-Cushinstown were beaten by 1-14 to 3-07.

At inter-county level, Cushe first appeared for Wexford as a member of the minor team. He won a Leinster MHC medal before defeat by Cork in the 1985 All-Ireland minor final. Cushe later progressed to the under-21 team and won consecutive Leinster U21HC medals, as well as losing the 1985 All-Ireland under-21 final to Galway.

Cushe made his senior team debut in a National Hurling League game against Limerick in October 1990. He won a Leinster SHC medal in 1996, before playing at full-back when Wexford beat Limerick in the 1996 All-Ireland final. Cushe won a second consecutive Leinster SHC medal in 1997. He retired from inter-county hurling in 1999.

== Coaching career ==
Cushe had just retired from playing when he joined Tony Dempsey's Wexford senior hurling management team as a selector. His two-year tenure in this role saw little in terms of success and he resigned from the role in July 2002. Cushe returned to the inter-county scene when he again became a selector with the Wexford senior team in September 2013.

== Honours ==
Naomh Éanna

- Wexford Intermediate Hurling Championship: 1990 (c), 2001

Wexford

- All-Ireland Senior Hurling Championship: 1996
- Leinster Senior Hurling Championship: 1996, 1997
- Leinster Under-21 Hurling Championship: 1986, 1987
- Leinster Minor Hurling Championship: 1985
