= Diarmuid O'Keeffe =

Irish hurler

Personal information
- Native name: Diarmuid Ó Caoimh (Irish)
- Nickname: Dee
- Born: 2 January 1992 (age 34) Rathangan, County Wexford, Ireland
- Occupation: Secondary school teacher

Sport
- Sport: Hurling
- Position: Midfield
Club
- Years: Club
- St Anne's Rathangan
Club titles
	Football	Hurling
Wexford titles	2	0
College
- Years: College
- University of Limerick
College titles
- Fitzgibbon titles: 0
Inter-county
Years	County	Apps (scores)
2012-2024	Wexford	46 (4-41)
Inter-county titles
- Leinster titles: 1
- All-Irelands: 0
- NHL: 0
- All Stars: 1

Diarmuid O'Keeffe (born 2 January 1992) is an Irish hurler. At club level he plays with St Anne's Rathangan and at inter-county level he is a former member of the Wexford senior hurling team. O'Keeffe usually lines out as a midfielder.

== Club career ==
O'Keeffe began his club career as a dual player at juvenile and underage levels with the St Anne's Rathangan club. He won a Wexford U21HC title in 2011, by which time he had progressed to adult level in both codes.

O'Keeffe had his first success at adult level in 2012 when he won a Wexford SFC medal following St Anne's Rathangan 2–14 to 0–08 defeat of Castletown in the final. He claimed a second SFC winners' medal two years later when Gusserane were beaten in the final by 1–06 to 0-08. As a club hurler, O'Keeffe won a Wexford IHC title in 2017 following a 2–10 to 1–12 defeat of Crossabeg–Ballymurn in the final.

A Wexford IFC title followed for O'Keeffe in 2020, when St Anne's Rathanagan beat Ferns St Aidan's by two points. He has failed to add a Wexford SHC medal to his collection after losing three finals between 2019 and 2024.

== Inter-county career ==
O'Keeffe began his inter-county career with Wexford as a 16-year-old member of the minor team in 2008. He spent three seasons in that grade but had little in terms of success after losing consecutive Leinster finals O'Keeffe immediately progressed to the under-21 team and made his debut in that grade in 2011. He was appointed captain of Wexford's under-21 football team in 2013, while he was also a member of the extended panel of the under-21 hurling team that year that claimed the Leinster U21HC after a 1–21 to 0–21 defeat of Kilkenny.

O'Keeffe made his senior team debut in February 2012 when he lined out at centre-forward in a 3–18 to 2-15 National League defeat by Antrim. He claimed his first senior silverware in 2018 when Wexford won the Walsh Cup after a free-taking shoot-out defeat of Kilkenny. O'Keeffe added a Leinster SHC medal to his collection when Wexford claimed the provincial title for the first time in 15 years after a 1–23 to 0–23 defeat of Kilkenny in the 2019 Leinster final. His performance for the team earned him the GAA/GPA Player of the Month award for hurling for June 2019, while he was also included on the GAA/GPA All-Star team at the end of the season.

O'Keeffe retired from inter-county hurling on 22 November 2024.

== Personal life ==
O'Keeffe works as a secondary school teacher in St. Peter's College in Dunboyne, County Meath. His father-in-law, Jarlath Burns, is an Ulster SFC-winner with Armagh who became President of the Gaelic Athletic Association in 2024. O'Keeffe's brother-in-law, Jarly Óg Burns, won an All-Ireland SFC medal with Armagh in 2024.

== Career statistics ==
Team	Year	National League			Leinster		All-Ireland		Total	
Team	Year	Division	Apps	Score	Apps	Score	Apps	Score	Apps	Score
Wexford	2012	Division 1	5	1-04	0	0-00	2	1-02	7	2-06
Wexford	2013	Division 1	0	0-00	0	0-00	0	0-00	0	0-00
Wexford	2014	Division 1	6	0-11	2	0-01	4	0-06	12	0-18
Wexford	2015	Division 1	6	0-08	2	0-00	1	0-00	9	0-08
Wexford	2016	Division 1	4	0-02	1	0-00	3	0-02	8	0-04
Wexford	2017	Division 1	7	2-07	3	1-03	1	0-02	11	3-12
Wexford	2018	Division 1	6	0-07	4	0-03	2	0-02	12	0-12
Wexford	2019	Division 1	6	0-08	5	0-09	1	0-02	12	0-19
Wexford	2020	Division 1	3	1-04	1	0-00	1	0-00	5	1-04
Wexford	2021	Division 1	5	0-05	2	0-03	1	1-00	8	1-08
Wexford	2022	Division 1	6	1-06	5	1-04	1	0-01	12	2-11
Wexford	2023	Division 1	3	0-00	4	0-01	—		7	0-01
Wexford	2024	Division 1	0	0-00	0	0-00	0	0-00	0	0-00
Total			57	5-62	29	2-24	17	2-17	103	9-103

== Honours ==
St Anne's Rathangan

- Wexford Senior Football Championship: 2012, 2014
- Wexford Intermediate Hurling Championship: 2017
- Wexford Intermediate Football Championship: 2020
- Wexford Under-21 Hurling Championship: 2011

Wexford

- Leinster Senior Hurling Championship: 2019
- Walsh Cup: 2018
- Leinster Under-21 Hurling Championship: 2013

Awards

- GAA/GPA All-Star Award: 2019
- GAA/GPA Player of the Month: June 2019
