= Tommy Dwyer (hurler) =

Irish sportsperson

Personal information
- Native name: Tomás Ó Duibhir (Irish)
- Born: Ferns, County Wexford

Sport
- Sport: Hurling
- Position: Midfield
Club
- Years: Club
- 2006-present: Ferns St Aidan's
Club titles
- Wexford titles: 0
Inter-county
- Years: County
- 2008-present: Wexford

Tommy Dwyer is an Irish sportsperson. He plays hurling with his local club Ferns St Aidan's and has been a member of the Wexford senior hurling team since 2008.
