= Liam Óg McGovern =

Irish hurler (born 1991)

Personal information
- Native name: Liam Óg Mac Giobheanaigh (Irish)
- Born: 1991 (age 34–35) Rathangan, County Wexford, Ireland
- Occupation: DJ
- Height: 6 ft 0 in (183 cm)

Sport
- Sport: Hurling
- Position: Centre-forward/ Wing-forward
Club
- Years: Club
- St Anne's Rathangan
Club titles
	Football	Hurling
Wexford titles	1	0
College
- Years: College
- 2009-2014: Dublin Institute of Technology
College titles
- Fitzgibbon titles: 0
Inter-county*
Years	County	Apps (scores)
2012-present	Wexford	26 (3-25)
Inter-county titles
- Leinster titles: 1
- All-Irelands: 0
- NHL: 0
- All Stars: 0
- *Inter County team apps and scores correct as of 19:10, 28 July 2019.

Liam Óg McGovern (born 1991) is an Irish hurler who plays for Wexford Senior Championship club St Anne's Rathangan and at inter-county level with the Wexford senior hurling team. He usually lines out in the half forward line.

== Playing career ==
=== Dublin Institute of Technology ===
As a student at the Dublin Institute of Technology, McGovern joined the senior hurling team during his second year. He lined out in several Fitzgibbon Cup campaigns without success.

=== St Anne's Rathangan ===
McGovern joined the St Anne's Rathangan club at a young age and played in all grades at juvenile and underage levels as a dual player. He enjoyed championship success in the minor and under-21 grades as a Gaelic footballer.

On 4 October 2009, McGovern lined out at right corner-forward when St Anne's Rathangan faced Horeswood in the final of the Wexford Football Championship. He scored a point from play but ended on the losing side after a 3–11 to 1–15 defeat.

McGovern was switched to centre-forward when St Anne's Rathangan qualified for the Wexford Football Championship final against Castletown on 8 October 2012. He scored two points from play and was instrumental in setting up two goals in the 2–14 to 0–08 victory.

=== Wexford ===
==== Minor and under-21 ====
McGovern first played for Wexford as a member of the minor team during the 2008 Leinster Championship. On 6 July 2008, he lined out at right corner-forward when Wexford suffered a 1–19 to 0–12 defeat by Kilkenny in the Leinster final.

McGovern was once again eligible for the minor grade in 2009. He lined out at right corner-forward in a second successive Leinster final on 5 July 2009 and scored four points in the 1–19 to 0–11 defeat by Kilkenny.

On 23 June 2010, McGovern made his first appearance for the Wexford under-21 team when he lined out at left corner-forward in a 2–17 to 2–13 defeat of Carlow. He was switched to right wing-forward for the Leinster final on 14 July 2010 and scored four points in the 2–15 to 0–15 defeat by Dublin.

McGovern lined out at left wing-forward in a second successive Leinster final on 13 July 2011. He ended on the losing side after scoring a point from play in the 1–18 to 0–11 defeat by Dublin for the second year in-a-row.

McGovern was eligible for the Wexford under-21 team for a third and final season in 2012. He made his final appearance in the grade on 20 June 2012 when Wexford suffered a 3–20 to 4–06 defeat by Kilkenny at the semi-final stage.

==== Intermediate ====
McGovern was in his final year with the under-21 team when he was drafted onto the Wexford intermediate panel for the 2012 Leinster Championship. On 28 June 2012, he scored two points from right wing-forward when Wexford suffered a 3–20 to 2–14 defeat by Kilkenny in the Leinster final.

==== Senior ====
McGovern was added to the Wexford senior panel during the 2012 season. He made his first appearance for the team on 30 June 2012 when he came on as a 67th-minute substitute for David Redmond in a 4–12 to 0–14 defeat of Carlow in the All-Ireland Qualifiers.

In August 2017, McGovern suffered a cruciate knee ligament injury in a club game which ruled him out of the 2017 National League. He had only returned to competitive action at the start of the 2017 Leinster Championship when he suffered a second cruciate knee ligament injury in training which ruled him out of the rest of the season.

On 30 June 2019, McGovern lined out at midfield when Wexford qualified for their second Leinster final in three years. He scored a point from play and ended the game with a winners' medal after the 1–23 to 0–23 defeat of Kilkenny.

== Career statistics ==
As of 27 March 2022.

Team	Year	National League			Leinster		All-Ireland		Total	
Team	Year	Division	Apps	Score	Apps	Score	Apps	Score	Apps	Score
Wexford	2012	Division 1B	0	0-00	0	0-00	2	0-01	2	0-01
Wexford	2013	Division 1B	0	0-00	0	0-00	0	0-00	0	0-00
Wexford	2014	Division 1B	6	1-09	2	1-02	4	1-08	12	3-19
Wexford	2015	Division 1B	6	4-12	2	0-03	1	0-00	9	4-15
Wexford	2016	Division 1B	6	0-03	1	0-04	3	0-03	10	0-10
Wexford	2017	Division 1B	0	0-00	1	0-00	0	0-00	1	0-00
Wexford	2018	Division 1A	0	0-00	2	0-00	2	0-00	4	0-00
Wexford	2019	Division 1A	6	0-04	5	1-03	1	0-01	12	1-08
Wexford	2020	Division 1B	5	0-03	1	0-00	1	0-00	7	0-03
Wexford	2021	Division 1B	4	0-01	2	0-04	1	0-01	7	0-06
Wexford	2022	Division 1A	6	0-02	0	0-00	0	0-00	6	0-02
Career total			39	5-34	16	2-16	15	1-14	70	8-64

== Honours ==
St Anne's

- Wexford Senior Football Championship (1): 2012
- Wexford Under-21 Hurling Championship (1): 2011
- Wexford Minor Football Championship (1): 2008

Wexford

- Leinster Senior Hurling Championship (1): 2019
