= Séamus Casey (hurler) =

Irish hurler

Personal information
- Native name: Séamus Ó Cathasaigh (Irish)
- Born: 1997 (age 28–29) Oylegate, County Wexford, Ireland
- Occupation: Student

Sport
- Sport: Hurling
- Position: Left corner-forward
Club
- Years: Club
- Oylegate-Glenbrien
Club titles
- Cork titles: 0
College
- Years: College
- Institute of Technology, Carlow
College titles
- Fitzgibbon titles: 0
Inter-county*
Years	County	Apps (scores)
2019-	Wexford	0 (0-00)
Inter-county titles
- Leinster titles: 0
- All-Irelands: 0
- NHL: 0
- All Stars: 0
- *Inter County team apps and scores correct as of 22:25, 19 March 2019.

Séamus Casey (born 1997) is an Irish hurler who plays for Wexford Senior Championship club Oylegate-Glenbrien and at inter-county level with the Wexford senior hurling team. He usually lines out as a left corner-forward.

== Career statistics ==
As of match played 16 March 2019.

Team	Year	National League			Leinster		All-Ireland		Total	
Team	Year	Division	Apps	Score	Apps	Score	Apps	Score	Apps	Score
Wexford	2019	Division 1B	1	1-01	0	0-00	0	0-00	1	1-01
Total			1	1-01	0	0-00	0	0-00	1	1-01
