= Ian Byrne (hurler) =

Irish hurler

Personal information
- Native name: Iain Ó Broin (Irish)
- Born: 1992 (age 33–34) Ferns, County Wexford, Ireland
- Occupation: Secondary school teacher
- Height: 6 ft 0 in (183 cm)

Sport
- Sport: Hurling
- Position: Right wing-forward
Club
- Years: Club
- Ferns St Aidan's
Club titles
- Wexford titles: 1
- Leinster titles: 0
- All-Ireland Titles: 0
Inter-county*
Years	County	Apps (scores)
2014-2020	Wexford	9 (1-34)
Inter-county titles
- Leinster titles: 1
- All-Irelands: 0
- NHL: 0
- All Stars: 0
- *Inter County team apps and scores correct as of 14:03, 5 July 2015.

Ian Byrne is an Irish hurler who plays as a left wing-forward for the Wexford senior team.

Born in Ferns, County Wexford, Byrne first played competitive hurling during his schooling at FCJ Secondary School in Bunclody. He arrived on the inter-county scene at the age of sixteen when he first linked up with the Wexford minor team before later joining the under-21 side. He made his senior debut during the 2014 league. Byrne has since gone on to become a regular member of the team.

At club level, Byrne plays with Ferns St Aidan's.

== Honours ==
FCJ Bunclody

- South Leinster Juvenile Hurling 'B' Championship (1): 2007.

Wexford

- Leinster Senior Hurling Championship (1): 2019.
- Leinster Under-21 Hurling Championship (1): 2013.
