= Crossabeg–Ballymurn GAA =

Gaelic sports club in County Wexford, Ireland

- Founded: 1966
- County: Wexford
- Colours: White and Green

Playing kits
Standard colours

Senior Club Championships
	All Ireland	Leinster champions	Wexford champions
Football:	0	0	1
Hurling:	0	0	2

Crossabeg–Ballymurn GAA Club is located in County Wexford, Ireland. It is part of Wexford GAA. It is three miles (5 km) north of Wexford town and runs for approximately 11 miles (18 km) across like a figure eight. The parish consists of the two half parishes of Crossabeg and Ballymurn. The club takes the name of the parishes in which it is based (Parishes of County Wexford Ireland).

== History ==
=== Early history ===
Gaelic games have been played in the two half parishes of Crossabeg and Ballymurn since 1886, but the two areas operated independently of one another for the first 80 years of the Gaelic Athletic Association, as each parish had its own team.

The club contested the first Wexford senior football final of 1886 losing to Rosslare. The club won the senior football final of 1897.

The first hurling highlight was in 1891 when Crossabeg–Ballymurn was Wexford's representative in the All Ireland championship which was lost Ballyduff after extra time. That was Kerry's only All Ireland hurling championship success.

In the early 20th century, Ballymurn recorded a first county title when winning the junior hurling championship of 1908 and this was quickly followed by senior success in 1910 and 1911. Crossabeg captured the Junior hurling title of 1914 and Ballymurn won it for the second time in 1916. Crossabeg were senior hurling champions in 1918 which was the last title they won as a separate club. Ballymurn won the minor hurling championship of 1929 which was quickly followed by an Intermediate hurling title in 1930. They played senior hurling in the early 1930s and during that time they won the Echo Shield (an important competition of that era).

Ballymurn then followed Crossabeg back into the junior grade where both half parishes operated for over 30 years very much independent of each other with little if any inter-change of players.

There were no titles won and in some years a team might not be fielded at all, resulting in players throwing in their lot with neighbouring perishes, but never together.

The names of players from the Crossabeg and Ballymurn parishes are to be found playing with other teams in the surrounding areas such as Sallybeachers, Ardcolm, New Irelands, Oylegate, Glenbrien, Shelmaliers, Glynn and the Faythe Harriers throughout this period.

=== Current club ===
As the clubs entered the 1960s, a number of people from the area decided it was time to unite under one club to serve the area and so in 1966 the present day Crossabeg–Ballymurn GAA club came into being.

The new club entered a team in the junior championship but it took a number of years to gain any successes. In the early 1970s, championship success was halted by St Fintans in the Wexford District final for three consecutive seasons. In 1972, a first Wexford district junior hurling title was won when they beat St Fintans in the final. The club went on to contest its first county final that year losing out to Cloughbawn in the final.

Despite the loss, the club opted to go up to the Intermediate grade. They contested the 1974 intermediate final losing on a replay to Gorey. They were beaten semi-finalists in 1976, and were beaten in the final of 1977 by a rising St Martins side. For the next ten years, the club was always listed as one of the seasons fancied sides but the breakthrough never came.

In the meantime at underage level, the club lost the 1973 minor hurling final to Rathnure / Duffry Rovers when teamed up with neighbours Oylegate. Two years later, they won the U21 hurling title when joined with the Shelmaliers beating Gorey in the final. In 1980, they united with Oylegate to win the Minor B hurling, beating Ferns in the final. They again won the U21 hurling in 1982, beating Rathnure/Cushinstown in the final. The club went it alone in 1986 and captured the U21B hurling title.

In 1985, it was the junior B footballers who beat Castletown in the final to record a first adult success in football after all the effort to win a hurling title. However, as in the previous century the win signaled a change of fortune. The Intermediate hurlers contested a first final in ten years when they lost the 1987 final to near neighbours Glynn/Barntown. The club was back the following year to beat Shamrocks in the final and to record a first adult hurling success in the parish for 58 years. This victory also saw the parish return to the top senior grade of Wexford hurling.

The club more than held its own at senior level and in 1994 narrowly lost the senior semi final to Oulart/The Ballagh who went on to record their own first senior win. At underage level in 1994, the club contested its first premier minor hurling final as a single club, losing out to Rathnure. In 1995, the junior B hurlers won the final at the third attempt beating the Rapparees in the final having lost the 1989 final to Bannow/Ballymitty.

In 2000, the club was relegated from senior ranks. Worse was to follow when in 2003 saw the team relegated to junior ranks for the first time in 30 years.

The club reached the junior hurling final of 2006 where they lost by a point to Our Lady's Island. In 2008, the club were knocked out of the junior championship but went on to claim the junior shield when beating Geraldine O'Hanrahans, their first adult cup in 13 years.

== Honours ==
- Wexford Senior Hurling Championships (1): 1918
- Wexford Intermediate Hurling Championships (1): 1930 (as Ballymurrin)
- Wexford Intermediate A Hurling Championships (1): 2014
- Wexford Intermediate A Football Championships: (1): 2017
- Wexford Junior Hurling Championship (3): 1914 (as Crossabeg), 2016 (as Ballymurrin), 2012
- Wexford Junior Football Championships (2): 2012, 2014
