= Lee Chin =

Irish hurler

Personal information
- Born: 8 October 1992 (age 34) Wexford, Ireland
- Height: 1.83 m (6 ft 0 in)

Sport
- Sport: Hurling
- Position: Centre-forward
Club
- Years: Club
- 2009-present: Faythe Harriers
Club titles
- Wexford titles: 0
College
- Years: College
- Dublin Institute of Technology
College titles
- Fitzgibbon titles: 0
Inter-county*
Years	County	Apps (scores)
2011-present	Wexford	57 (12-336)
Inter-county titles
- Leinster titles: 1
- All-Irelands: 0
- NHL: 0
- All Stars: 1
- *Inter County team apps and scores correct as of 20:57, 8 Jun 2025.

Lee Chin (born 8 October 1992) is an Irish hurler who plays for Wexford Senior Championship club Faythe Harriers and at inter-county level with the Wexford senior hurling team.

== Playing career ==
=== Faythe Harriers ===
Chin joined the Faythe Harriers club at a young age and played in all grades at juvenile and underage levels, enjoying championship success at under-21 level in 2012. Chin previously played football for St. Mary's and the Sarsfields.

During a 2011 game against Duffry Rovers, Chin was the target of racist name-calling by two Duffry Rovers players who were later suspended from the team. Wexford GAA chairman Diarmuid Devereux condemned the incident, saying such incidents "cannot be tolerated".

On 14 October 2012, Chin was at left wing-back when Faythe Harriers faced Oulart-the Ballagh in the Wexford Senior Championship final. He ended the game on the losing side following a 2–12 to 0–13 victory for Oulart.

=== Wexford ===
==== Minor and under-21 ====
Chin first lined out for Wexford as a member of the minor team during the 2010 Leinster Championship. He made his first appearance on 1 May 2010 when he lined out at centre-back in a 3–21 to 2–17 defeat of Offaly. Chin's minor tenure ended on 26 June when Wexford suffered a 1–16 to 1-15 semi-final defeat by Dublin.

Chin was drafted onto the Wexford under-21 team for the 2011 Leinster Championship. He made his first appearance in that grade on 6 June 2011 when he scored 0-02 from midfield in a 1–19 to 0–10 defeat of Offaly.

Chin was eligible for the minor grade again the following season. On 11 July 2013, he won a Leinster Championship medal after scoring a point from midfield in Wexford's 1–21 to 0–21 defeat of Kilkenny in the final.

==== Senior ====
Chin made his first appearance for the Wexford senior team on 24 February 2013. He lined out at left wing-back in a 2–15 to 0–16 defeat of Carlow in the National League. Chin made his first Leinster Championship on 8 June when he came on as a substitute for Ciarán O'Shaughnessy at midfield in a 1-17 apiece draw with Dublin.

Chin was named GAA/GPA Player of the Month for July 2014.

On 2 July 2017, Chin lined out in his first Leinster final. He was selected at centre-forward but spent much of the game against Galway at midfield. Chin scored four points in the 0–29 to 1–17 defeat.

On 20 January 2018, Chin was named amongst the substitutes when Wexford faced Kilkenny in the Walsh Cup final. He was introduced as a half-time substitute for Jack Guiney and scored a point from play in the 1-24 apiece draw. Wexford won the subsequent free-taking shoot-out, with Chin claiming his first silverware at senior level with Wexford.

On 8 April 2023, a charity hurling match between Wexford and Tipperary was ended prematurely after Chin suffered racial abuse from the stands. A full investigation was launched.

Chin has also made appearances for the Wexford senior football team, and Wexford youths soccer club in the league of Ireland

== Personal life ==
Chin was born in Ireland to a Malaysian Chinese father and Irish mother, who run a Chinese takeaway in Wexford Town. He attended Wexford Vocational College and began training as a barber, before going on to briefly study in Dublin Institute of Technology. Chin has spoken out about racial abuse he and his family have received during matches and on the streets. Chin is a brand ambassador for iPro Sport, Fulfil Nutrition and O'Neills, and has been an ambassador for Pfizer's Healthy Towns campaign.

== Career statistics ==
As of match played 5 May 2024

Team	Year	National League			Leinster		All-Ireland		Total	
Team	Year	Division	Apps	Score	Apps	Score	Apps	Score	Apps	Score
Wexford	2011	Division 1	0	0-00	0	0-00	0	0-00	0	0-00
Wexford	2012	Division 1B	0	0-00	0	0-00	0	0-00	0	0-00
Wexford	2013	Division 1B	4	0-01	2	0-00	2	0-00	8	0-01
Wexford	2014	Division 1B	6	0-01	2	0-02	3	0-05	11	0-08
Wexford	2015	Division 1B	6	0-03	2	0-00	1	0-00	9	0-03
Wexford	2016	Division 1B	6	0-06	0	0-00	3	0-08	9	0-14
Wexford	2017	Division 1B	7	0-20	3	0-13	1	0-03	11	0-36
Wexford	2018	Division 1A	6	0-30	4	1-09	2	0-08	12	1-47
Wexford	2019	Division 1A	5	1-06	5	0-44	1	1-07	11	2-57
Wexford	2020	Division 1A	2	0-01	1	0-08	1	0-00	4	0-09
Wexford	2021	Division 1B	5	1-40	2	1-16	1	1-12	8	3-68
Wexford	2022	Division 1B	1	0-01	5	0-37	2	1-22	8	1-60
Wexford	2023	Division 1A	3	0-25	4	1-32	—		7	1-57
Wexford	2024	Division 1A	3	0-16	3	3-34	0	0-00	6	3-50
Total			54	2-150	33	6-195	17	3-65	104	11-410

== Honours ==
Wexford

- Leinster Senior Hurling Championship (1): 2019 (c)
- Walsh Cup (1): 2018
- Leinster Under-21 Hurling Championship (1): 2013

Leinster

- Interprovincial Championship (1): 2014

Individual

- GAA/GPA Player of the Month (1): July 2014
- GAA GPA All Stars (1): 2019

Sporting positions
Preceded by Matthew O'Hanlon	Wexford Senior Hurling Joint Captain; 2017-present	Succeeded by Incumbent
