= Naomh Éanna GAA =

Irish hurling, football and camogie club

Naomh Éanna
- Naomh Eanna
- Founded: 1970
- County: Wexford
- Nickname: St. Enda’s
- Colours: Green and White, Yellow socks.
- Grounds: Páirc Uí Shíocháin/Áras Naomh Éanna, Clonattin Road, Gorey
- Coordinates: 52.68175°N 6.27439°W

Playing kits
Standard colours

Senior Club Championships
	All Ireland	Leinster champions	Wexford champions
Hurling:	-	-	2

Naomh Éanna GAA ('Saint Enda’s') is a hurling, Gaelic football and camogie club based in Gorey, County Wexford, Ireland.

== History ==
The Senior hurling and Senior Football club was founded in 1970 by a group of Christian Brothers and takes its name from Scoil Éanna, the school founded by Patrick Pearse.

The camogie team was revived in 2002.

Naomh Éanna won the Wexford IHC in 2015, advanced to the 2015–16 All-Ireland Intermediate Club Hurling Championship where they lost to Kiltale (Meath). Naomh Éanna were also promoted to the senior championship, winning their first senior hurling county title in 2018.

== Honours ==
- Wexford Senior Hurling Championship: (2) 2018, 2023
- Wexford Intermediate Hurling Championship: (4) 1974, 1990, 2001, 2015
- Wexford Intermediate A Hurling Championship: (1) 2012
- Wexford Intermediate Football Championship: (2) 1995, 2023
- Wexford Junior Football Championship: (1) 1994

== Notable players ==
- Billy Byrne
- Ger Cushe
- J. J. Doyle
- Rory Kinsella
- Conor McDonald
- Shane McGuckin (played county hurling for Offaly)
