= St Anne's GAA (Wexford) =

Gaelic sports club in County Wexford, Ireland

St Anne's
- Cumann Naomh Áine
- Founded: 1933
- County: Wexford
- Colours: Blue and navy
- Grounds: Y35 AD70

Playing kits
Standard colours

Senior Club Championships
	All Ireland	Leinster champions	Wexford champions
Football:	0	0	5
Hurling:	0	0	2

St Anne's GAA is a Gaelic Athletic Association club located in Rathangan, County Wexford, Ireland. The club fields teams in Men's and Ladies Gaelic football and hurling.

== History ==
The St Anne's club has been active, in different forms and names, since the beginning of the GAA in 1884. It originally took the name of Kilmannon in 1886 and down through the years had the names of Brownstown, Baldwinstown, Duncormick, Cleariestown, Redmoor and Scar representing the parish, sometimes even against one another. The name St Anne's was first mooted in the parish in 1932 and with a few brief exceptions that name has stayed with the club ever since.

Adult success was scarce enough until in 1966, when they won the junior football county title followed by the senior in 1968. This was helped greatly by the amalgamation with Kilmore in underage and all the success that it brought. The single parish successes in underage in the 1980s and 1990s in hurling and football culminated in the great senior double in 2000 and a senior football title in 2001.

In February 2018, a book about the history of the GAA in the parish, named "October 2000" was launched in the GAA centre.

In 2019, St Anne's started playing rounders at underage and entered both boys' and girls' rounders teams in the All-Ireland Feile in Cork.

== Honours ==
- Wexford Senior Hurling Championship (2): 1924, 2000
- Wexford Senior Football Championship (5): 1968, 2000, 2001, 2012, 2014
- Wexford Senior Ladies Football Championship (1): 2017
- Wexford Intermediate Ladies Football Championship (1): 2012
- Wexford Intermediate Football Championship (1): 1990, 2020
- Wexford Intermediate Hurling Championship (2): 1999, 2017
- Wexford Junior Football Championship (1): 1966
- Wexford Junior Hurling Championship (3): 1924, 1977, 1996
- Wexford Junior Ladies Football Championship (1) 2011
- Wexford Junior B Camogie Championship 2018
- Wexford Junior C Camogie Championship 2010

== Notable players ==
- Jack Berry
- Darragh Ryan
- Diarmuid O'Keeffe
- Redmond Barry
- Liam Óg McGovern
