= Oylegate–Glenbrien GAA =

Gaelic sports club in County Wexford, Ireland

Oylegate–Glenbrien
- Bearna na hAille-Gleann Bhriain
- County: Wexford
- Colours: Blue and white
- Grounds: Oylegate Glenbrien GAA Grounds, Oylegate
- Coordinates: 52°25′01″N 6°30′15″W

Playing kits
Standard colours

Senior Club Championships
	All Ireland	Leinster champions	Wexford champions
Hurling:	0	0	1

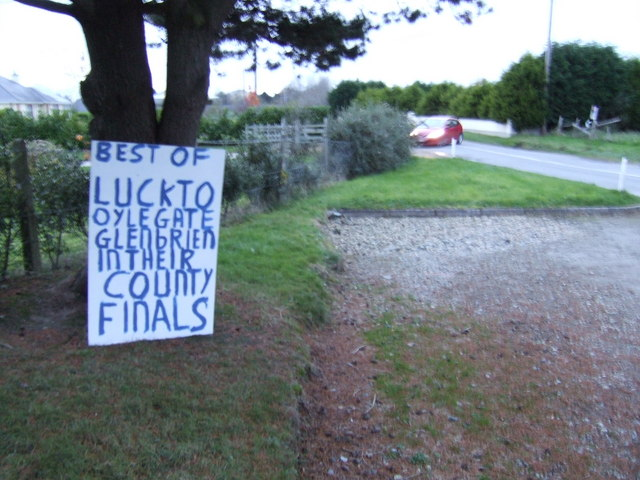
Sign in support of Oylegate–Glenbrien (2007)

Oylegate–Glenbrien GAA is a Gaelic Athletic Association club located in the villages of Oylegate (Oilgate) and Glenbrien in County Wexford, Ireland. The club fields teams in both hurling and Gaelic football.

== Honours ==
- Wexford Senior Hurling Championship (1): 1963
- Wexford Intermediate Hurling Championship (5): 1959, 1992, 2012, 2016, 2021
- Wexford Junior Hurling Championship (1): 1955
