= Ferns St Aidan's GAA =

Gaelic games club in County Wexford, Ireland

Ferns St Aidan's
- Naomh Aodán Fearna
- Founded: 1886
- County: Wexford
- Colours: Red and white
- Grounds: Ferns

Playing kits
Standard colours

Senior Club Championships
| | All Ireland | Leinster champions | Wexford champions |
|---|---|---|---|
| Football: | 0 | 0 | 0 |
| Hurling: | 0 | 0 | 1 |

Ferns St Aidan's is a Gaelic Athletic Association club based in Ferns, County Wexford, Ireland. The club was founded in 1886 and fields teams in hurling, Gaelic football and camogie.

== Overview ==
=== Facilities ===
Ferns St Aidan's has three full-sized adult pitches (one of which is the exact dimensions of Croke Park, and is regularly used by county teams for training) as well as a smaller, underage, pitch. The club also have a hurling wall for practice sessions, a clubhouse with four dressing rooms and a meeting room, two tennis courts and a walkway around the grounds.

=== Teams ===
Ferns St Aidan's field various teams in hurling, Gaelic football, and camogie at all age groups from under-8 right up to adult level. It is estimated that there are in the region of 300 players involved in the club altogether.

== Achievements ==
- Wexford Senior Hurling Championships: 1
  - 2022
- Wexford Intermediate Hurling Championships: 6
  - 1958, 1979, 1984, 1989, 1998, 2007
- Wexford Junior Hurling Championships: 5
  - 1912, 1932, 1952, 1956, 1958
- Wexford Junior Football Championships: 2
  - 1952, 1993
- Wexford Under-21 Hurling Championships: 2
  - 2005, 2007
- Wexford Minor Football Championships: 1
  - 1958
- Wexford Minor Hurling Championships: 4
  - 1957, 1958, 1965, 2004

=== Notable players ===
- Ian Byrne
- Tommy Dwyer
- Paul Morris
- Éamonn Scallan 1996 All-Ireland Senior Hurling Championship winner.
