= 1965 All-Ireland Under-21 Hurling Championship final =

1965 All-Ireland Under-21 Hurling Championship Final
- Event: 1965 All-Ireland Under-21 Hurling Championship
| Wexford | Tipperary |
| 3-7 | 1-4 |
- Venue: Nowlan Park, Kilkenny
- Referee: Jimmy Duggan (Galway)
- Weather: Rain

The 1965 All-Ireland Under-21 Hurling Championship final was a hurling match that was played to determine the winners of the 1965 All-Ireland Under-21 Hurling Championship, the second season of the All-Ireland Under-21 Hurling Championship, a tournament organised by the Gaelic Athletic Association for the champion teams of the four provinces of Ireland. The final was contested by Wexford of Leinster and Tipperary of Munster, with Wexford winning by 3-7 to 1-4.

The All-Ireland final between Wexford and Tipperary was the second championship meeting between the two teams. Both sides were appearing in their second consecutive All-Ireland final with Tipperary hoping to retain the title.

Wexford adapted better to the appalling weather conditions and nullified the threat of Michael "Babs" Keating. His only contribution over the hour was a goal from a 40-yards free. The Wexford defence of Dan Quigley, Willie O'Neill, Vinny Staples and Willie Murphy were standout players in the 3-7 to 1-4 victory.

Wexford's All-Ireland victory was their first. As of 2015 it remains their only All-Ireland title in the under-21 grade.

== Match ==
=== Details ===
12 September 1965

| Wexford | 3-7 – 1-4 | Tipperary |
|---|---|---|
| C. Dowdall 1-2, T. Doran 1-2, J. Berry 1-1, T Maher 0-2. | | M. Keating 1-0, P. Ryan 0-1, A Brennan 0-1, P. J. Ryan 0-1, G. Quinlan 0-1. |

Nowlan Park, Kilkenny
Referee: A. O'Grady (Galway)

| Wexford | Tipperary |
