= Séamus Barron =

Irish hurler (1946–2022)

Personal information
- Native name: Séamus Barún (Irish)
- Born: 1946 Rathnure, County Wexford, Leinster, Ireland
- Died: 7 February 2022 (aged 75) Wexford, County Wexford, Leinster, Ireland
- Occupation: Machinery dealership owner

Sport
- Sport: Hurling
- Position: Right wing-forward
Club
- Years: Club
- Rathnure
Club titles
- Wexford titles: 2
- Leinster titles: 1
- All-Ireland Titles: 0
Inter-county
- Years: County
- 1966–1970: Wexford
Inter-county titles
- Leinster titles: 1
- All-Irelands: 1
- NHL: 0
- All Stars: 0

James Barron (1946 – 7 February 2022), known as Séamus Barron, was an Irish hurler who played for club side Rathnure and at inter-county level with the Wexford senior hurling team. He usually lined out as a forward.

== Career ==
Barron first appeared on the inter-county scene as part of the minor hurling team which won Wexford’s first ever Leinster and All-Ireland titles in 1963. He played at full-forward in the All-Ireland final against Limerick, scoring 1–1. Having progressed to under-21 level, Barron lined out in three successive All-Ireland finals. He claimed his sole winners' medal in the grade in 1965 after a defeat of Tipperary. At senior level, Barron made nine appearances on the Wexford team between 1966 and 1970. He earned an All-Ireland medal as an unused substitute in the 1968 All-Ireland final against Tipperary. Barron was a life-long member of the Rathnure club and lined out in the 1972 All-Ireland club final defeat by Blackrock. He served as a selector under Liam Griffin with the Wexford team that won the 1996 All-Ireland Championship.

== Personal life and death ==
Barron established Barron Machinery in 1983. The company initially provided used tractors until it eventually grew into a substantial franchise dealer of big brands. He died on 7 February 2022, at the age of 75.

== Honours ==
=== Player ===
Rathnure

- Leinster Senior Club Hurling Championship: 1971
- Wexford Senior Hurling Championship: 1967, 1971, 1972, 1973, 1984

Wexford

- All-Ireland Senior Hurling Championship: 1968
- Leinster Senior Hurling Championship: 1968
- All-Ireland Under-21 Hurling Championship: 1965
- Leinster Under-21 Hurling Championship: 1964, 1965, 1966
- All-Ireland Minor Hurling Championship: 1963
- Leinster Minor Hurling Championship: 1963

=== Management ===
Rathnure

- Leinster Senior Club Hurling Championship: 1971, 1986, 1987, 1998
- Wexford Senior Hurling Championship: 1986, 1987, 1990, 1998

Wexford

- All-Ireland Senior Hurling Championship: 1996
- Leinster Senior Hurling Championship: 1996
