= Christy Jacob =

Irish hurler

Personal information
- Native name: Criostóir Iácób (Irish)
- Born: 1944 (age 81–82) Wickmore, County Wexford, Ireland
- Height: 5 ft 7 in (170 cm)

Sport
- Sport: Hurling
- Position: Left wing-forward
Club
- Years: Club
- Oulart–The Ballagh
Club titles
- Wexford titles: 0
Inter-county
Years	County	Apps (scores)
1966-1973	Wexford	11 (3-12)
Inter-county titles
- Leinster titles: 1
- All-Irelands: 1
- NHL: 1
- All Stars: 0

Christopher "Christy" Jacob (born 1944) is an Irish retired hurler who enjoyed a successful career as a centre-back with the Wexford senior team.

Born in Wickmore, County Wexford, Jacob was introduced to hurling in his youth. His granduncle, Jim Mythen, was an All-Ireland medal winner with Wexford in 1910. Jacob quickly established himself on the Oulart–The Ballagh junior team. A championship medal winner in the junior and intermediate grades, he lost several senior championship finals.

Jacob made his debut on the inter-county scene when he first linked up with the Wexford minor team. After little success in this grade, he later won an All-Ireland medal with the under-21 team. Jacob joined the senior team during the 1966 championship. He went on to play a key role for Wexford in attack during a successful era, and won one All-Ireland medal, one Leinster medal and one National Hurling League medal.

Throughout his inter-county career Jacob made 11 championship appearances. He retired from inter-county hurling following the conclusion of the 1973 championship.

Jacob's siblings- Mick, Robbie and Bridie - also played with distinction at all levels with Wexford. His nieces and nephews - Helena, Ursula, Michael and Rory - have also lined out with Wexford.

== Playing career ==
=== Club ===
Jacob began his club career with the Oulart–The Ballagh junior team. He won a junior championship medal in 1967 before claiming an intermediate championship medal in 1968.

=== Inter-county ===
Jacob first came to prominence on the inaugural Wexford under-21 team. He won his first Leinster medal in 1964 as Laois were defeated by 4–7 to 2-2. On 4 October 1964 Wexford faced Tipperary in the All-Ireland final. A tally of 2-2 for Michael "Babs" Keating helped Tipperary to an easy 8–9 to 3–1 victory.

Wexford retained the provincial under-21 title in 1965 with Jacob winning a second Leinster medal. The subsequent All-Ireland final was a repeat of the previous year with Tipperary providing the opposition once again. A 3–7 to 1–4 victory gave Jacob an All-Ireland Under-21 Hurling Championship medal.

Jacob made his senior championship debut in a 3–18 to 4-5 Leinster semi-final defeat of Dublin on 19 June 1966.

After establishing himself on the starting fifteen, Jacob claimed his first national title in 1967 when a 3–10 to 1–9 defeat of Kilkenny gave him a National Hurling League medal.

Jacob won his sole Leinster medal in the senior grade in 1968 following a 3–13 to 4–9 defeat of reigning provincial and All-Ireland champions Kilkenny. This victory allowed Wexford to advance to an All-Ireland final against Tipperary, the outstanding team of the decade, on 1 September 1968. All was going to plan for Tipperary as they took a 1–11 to 1–3 lead at half-time. In one of the great All-Ireland comebacks, Tony Doran got Wexford back on track with a goal six minutes after the interval. Three more goals followed from Paul Lynch, Jack Berry and Doran again. Late goals from "Babs" Keating and Seán McLoughlin for Tipperary failed to stem the tide as Wexford secured a remarkable 5–8 to 3–12 victory. The victory gave Jacob his sole All-Ireland medal.

Over the next few years Jacob found it difficult to maintain his position on the Wexford team. After being dropped completely in 1970, he played in the Leinster finals of 1971 and 1973; however, Kilkenny won were victorious on both occasions. Jacob retired from inter-county hurling shortly after the 1973 defeat.
