= Mick Jacob =

Irish hurler and selector (born 1946)

Personal information
- Native name: Mícheál Iácób (Irish)
- Born: January 1946 (age 80) Wickmore, County Wexford, Ireland
- Occupation: Farmer
- Height: 5 ft 10 in (178 cm)

Sport
- Sport: Hurling
- Position: Centre-back
Club
- Years: Club
- 1962-2002: Oulart–The Ballagh
Club titles
- Wexford titles: 0
Inter-county
Years	County	Apps (scores)
1967-1984	Wexford	31 (0-13)
Inter-county titles
- Leinster titles: 4
- All-Irelands: 1
- NHL: 1
- All Stars: 3

Mick Jacob (born January 1946) is an Irish retired hurling selector and former player who enjoyed a successful career as a centre-back with the Wexford senior team.

Born in Wickmore, County Wexford, Jacob was introduced to hurling in his youth. His granduncle, Jim Mythen, was an All-Ireland medal winner with Wexford in 1910. Jacob was just sixteen years-old when he established himself on the Oulart–The Ballagh junior team. A championship medal winner in the junior and intermediate grades, Jacob lost five senior championship finals.

Jacob made his debut on the inter-county scene when he first linked up with the Wexford minor team. After little success in this grade, he later won an All-Ireland medal with the under-21 team. Jacob joined the senior team during the 1967-68 league. He went on to play a key role for Wexford in defence during a successful era, and won one All-Ireland medal, four Leinster medals and one National Hurling League medal. Jacob was an All-Ireland runner-up on three occasions.

As a member of the Leinster inter-provincial team, Jacob won three Railway Cup medals. Throughout his inter-county career he made 31 championship appearances. Jacob retired from inter-county hurling following the conclusion of the 1984 championship.

Jacob's siblings- Christy, Robbie and Bridie - also played with distinction at all levels with Wexford. His children - Helena, Ursula, Michael and Rory - have also lined out with Wexford.

Jacob won three All-Star awards, and was chosen as one of the 125 greatest hurlers of all time in a 2009 poll.

In retirement from playing Jacob became involved in team management and coaching. He was a selector with the Wexford senior team as well as with all levels with Oulart-the Ballagh.

== Playing career ==
=== Club ===
Jacob began his club career in goals for the Oulart–The Ballagh junior team in 1962. He won a junior championship medal in 1967 before claiming an intermediate championship medal in 1968.

=== Minor and under-21 ===
After one season with the Wexford minor team, Jacob first enjoyed success as the goalkeeper on the inaugural Wexford under-21 team. He won his first Leinster medal in 1964 as Laois were defeated by 4-7 to 2-2. On 4 October 1964 Wexford faced Tipperary in the All-Ireland final. A tally of 2-2 for Babs Keating helped Tipperary to an easy 8-9 to 3-1 victory.

Wexford retained the provincial under-21 title in 1965 with Jacob winning a second Leinster medal. The subsequent All-Ireland final was a repeat of the previous year with Tipperary providing the opposition once again. A 3-7 to 1-4 victory gave Jacob an All-Ireland Under-21 Hurling Championship medal.

Wexford retained their provincial crown in 1966, with Jacob collecting a third Leinster medal following a 7–10 to 2–8 demolition of Laois. The subsequent All-Ireland decider saw Cork providing the opposition. After a high-scoring hour of hurling Wexford scored 5–6 to Cork's 3–12 resulting in a draw. The replay was also a close affair with the sides finishing level again at 4–9 apiece. A third game produced the eventual winner as Wexford were defeated by 9–9 to 5–9.

=== Senior ===
Jacob joined his brother Christy on the Wexford senior team in 1968. He was an unused substitute throughout the season as Wexford claimed the Leinster and All-Ireland titles following respective defeats of Kilkenny and Tipperary.

Jacob made his senior championship debut in a 5-10 to 3-11 Leinster semi-final defeat by Offaly on 29 June 1969.

Wexford regrouped in 1970, however, Jacob remained on the bench for their 4–16 to 3–14 defeat of old rivals Kilkenny in the Leinster final. Wexford subsequently faced Cork in the All-Ireland decider on 6 September 1970 and Jacob was back on the starting fifteen. A record 64-point scoreline and eleven goals were produced in a sometimes ill-tempered and disappointing contest. Tony Doran top scored for Wexford with two goals, however, the day belonged to Eddie O'Brien who scored a hat-trick of goals for Cork from his hand. A remarkable 6–21 to 5–10 score line gave Cork the victory.

In 1972 Jacob became Wexford's first All-Star recipient when his performances earned him the award.

Jacob won a National Hurling League medal in 1973 following a 4–13 to 3–7 defeat of Limerick.

After a five-year period of Kilkenny dominance, Wexford broke through in 1976. A 2–20 to 1–6 trouncing gave Jacob a third Leinster medal. It was his first won on the field of play. Cork provided the opposition in the subsequent All-Ireland final on 5 September 1976. Wexford got off to a great start and were 2–2 to no score ahead after just six minutes. Wexford had a two-point lead with ten minutes to go, however, three points from Jimmy Barry-Murphy, two from Pat Moylan and a kicked effort from Ray Cummins gave Cork a 2–21 to 4–11 victory. In spite of this defeat Jacob was later presented with a second All-Star award.

Jacob collected his fourth Leinster medal in 1977 following a 3–17 to 3–14 defeat of Kilkenny. The All-Ireland final on 4 September 1977 was a repeat of the previous year, with Cork providing the opposition once again. Seánie O'Leary score the decisive goal for Cork as the game entered the last quarter, while Martin Coleman brought off a match-winning save from Christy Keogh to foil the Wexford comeback. A 1–17 to 3–8 defeat was Jacob's lot as he endured a second successive year as an All-Ireland runner-up. He later collected a third All-Star.

Wexford went into decline following this defeat as Kilkenny and Offaly emerged as the dominant teams in Leinster. Jacob played his last game for Wexford in a 1–15 to 2–11 Leinster decider defeat by Offaly on 8 July 1984. He retired from inter-county hurling later that year when he sustained a serious eye injury in a practice match with his club.

=== Inter-provincial ===
Jacob also lined out with Leinster in the inter-provincial hurling competition. He first played for his province in 1973 as Leinster defeated Munster to take the Railway Cup. Jacob added further Railway Cup medals to his collection in 1975 and 1977.

== Honours ==
Oulart–The Ballagh

- Wexford Intermediate Hurling Championship (1): 1968
- Wexford Junior Hurling Championship (1): 1967

Wexford

- All-Ireland Senior Hurling Championship (1): 1968 (sub)
- Leinster Senior Hurling Championship (4): 1968 (sub), 1970 (sub), 1976, 1977
- National Hurling League (1): 1972-73
- All-Ireland Under-21 Hurling Championship (1): 1965
- Leinster Under-21 Hurling Championship (3): 1964, 1965, 1966

Leinster

- Railway Cup (3): 1973, 1975, 1977
