= Dan Quigley =

Irish hurler and coach

Personal information
- Native name: Dónall Ó Coigligh (Irish)
- Born: 1944 (age 81–82) Donard, County Wexford, Ireland
- Occupation: Farmer
- Height: 6 ft 1 in (185 cm)

Sport
- Sport: Hurling
- Position: Centre-back
Club
- Years: Club
- Rathnure
Club titles
- Wexford titles: 9
- Leinster titles: 3
- All-Ireland Titles: 0
Inter-county
Years	County	Apps (scores)
1962–1972	Wexford	20 (4–17)
Inter-county titles
- Leinster titles: 3
- All-Irelands: 1
- NHL: 1
- All Stars: 0

Daniel Quigley (born 1944) is an Irish retired hurling coach and former player who played as a full-back and as a centre-back with the Wexford senior team.

Born in Donard, County Wexford, Quigley had All-Ireland success at colleges level with St. Peter's College while simultaneously having championship successes at underage levels with the Rathnure club. A three-time Leinster medal winner with the Rathnure senior team, Quigley also won nine championship medals.

Quigley made his debut on the inter-county scene when he first linked up with the Wexford minor team. After little success in this grade, he later won an All-Ireland medal with the under-21 team. Quigley made his senior debut during the 1962–63 league. He went on to play a key role for Wexford in defence during a successful era, and won one All-Ireland medal, three Leinster medals and one National Hurling League medal. An All-Ireland runner-up on two occasions, Quigley captained the team to All-Ireland victory in 1968.

As a member of the Leinster inter-provincial team, Quigley won three Railway Cup medals. Throughout his inter-county career he made 20 championship appearances. Quigley retired from inter-county hurling following the conclusion of the 1972 championship.

Quigley's brothers – Pat, John, Jimmy and Martin – also played with distinction at all levels with Wexford.

Regarded as one of the greatest players of all-time, Quigley was named as the Texaco Hurler of the Year in 1968. He was also chosen as one of the 125 greatest hurlers of all time in a 2009 poll.

In retirement from playing Quigley became involved in team management and coaching at all levels with Rathnure.

== Playing career ==
=== College ===
During his schooling at St. Peter's College, Quigley established himself as a key member of the senior hurling team. In 1962 he won a Leinster medal following a 4–3 to 1–4 defeat of Kilkenny CBS. On 6 May 1962 St. Peter's faced Ennis CBS in the All-Ireland decider. A 4–11 to 2–4 victory gave Quigley an All-Ireland medal.

=== Club ===
Quigley was only seventeen years-old when he won his first championship medal at senior level following a defeat of St. Aidan's Enniscorthy. After a period of decline he won a second championship medal in 1967.

In 1971 Quigley added a third championship medal to his collection as Rathnure defeated Enniscorthy District to take the title. He later won a Leinster medal as Rathnure defeated a disappointing Bennettsbridge by 2–12 to 1–8. On 14 May 1972 Rathnure faced Blackrock of Cork in the All-Ireland decider. Quigley top scored for Rathnure with 2–4 as they fought back from being 12 points in arrears, however, Pat Moylan's goal secured a 5–13 to 6–9 victory for Blackrock.

Rathnure retained the title in 1972 following a 1–17 to 1–8 defeat of Rapparees before making it three-in-a-row in 1973 with a 2–7 to 1–7 defeat of Buffers Alley. Quigley subsequently secured a second Leinster medal following a 1–18 to 2–9 defeat of St. Rynagh's. On 17 March 1974 Rathnure faced old rivals Blackrock in the All-Ireland final. A tour de force by Quigley saw him score 3–6 in a 3–11 to 2–14 draw. The replay on 28 April 1974 was also a close affair. As Rathnure looked to be heading for victory, Éamonn O'Donoghue and Donie Collins scored two late goals to secure a 3–8 to 1–9 victory for Blackrock.

Quigley won a sixth championship medal in 1974 as his 1–3 helped Rathnure to a 2–8 to 1–5 defeat of Oulart-the Ballagh and fourth successive title.

In 1977 Quigley won a seventh championship medal as Buffers Alley were accounted for in the decider. He later claimed a third Leinster medal as Fenians were defeated by 0–16 to 1–10 in the provincial decider. On 27 March 1978 Rathnure faced St. Finbarr's of Cork in the All-Ireland final. Rathnure had an 0–8 to 0–1 half-time lead thanks to a gale-force wind, however, Barry Wiley scored the equaliser for St. Finbarr's with just ten minutes left to play. A Jimmy Barry-Murphy goal from a rebound sealed the title and resulted in a third All-Ireland final defeat for Quigley.

Quigley finished off his club career by winning back-to-back championship medals in 1979 and 1980 following defeats of Faythe Harriers and Buffers Alley respectively.

=== Inter-county ===
Quigley first had success as the full-back on the inaugural Wexford under-21 team. He won his first Leinster medal in 1964 as Laois were defeated by 4–7 to 2–2. On 4 October 1964 Wexford faced Tipperary in the All-Ireland final. A tally of 2–2 for Babs Keating helped Tipperary to an easy 8–9 to 3–1 victory.

Wexford retained the provincial under-21 title in 1965 with Quigley winning a second Leinster medal. The subsequent All-Ireland final was a repeat of the previous year with Tipperary providing the opposition once again. A 3–7 to 1–4 victory gave Quigley an All-Ireland Under-21 Hurling Championship medal.

After making his senior debut during the 1962–63 league, Quigley was added to the Wexford panel for the subsequent championship. He remained an unused substitute during their Leinster semi-final exit at the hands of Kilkenny.

Quigley made his senior championship debut at full-back in a 5–9 to 4–8 Leinster semi-final defeat by Kilkenny on 5 July 1964.

In 1965 Quigley won his first Leinster medal following a narrow 2–11 to 3–7 defeat of reigning champions Kilkenny. Tipperary were Wexford's opponents in the subsequent All-Ireland final on 5 September 1965, however, the game failed to live up to the two classic games between the two sides in 1960 and 1962. Victory went to Tipperary on that occasion by 2–16 to 0–10, courtesy of a brace of goals by Seán McLoughlin.

Quigley claimed his first national title in 1967 when a 3–10 to 1–9 defeat of Kilkenny gave him a National Hurling League medal.

Quigley was appointed captain of the team in 1968 and he quickly collected a second Leinster medal following a 3–13 to 4–9 defeat of reigning provincial and All-Ireland champions Kilkenny. This victory allowed Wexford to advance to an All-Ireland final against Tipperary, the outstanding team of the decade, on 1 September 1968. All was going to plan for Tipperary as they took a 1–11 to 1–3 lead at half-time. In one of the great All-Ireland comebacks, Tony Doran got Wexford back on track with a goal six minutes after the interval. Three more goals followed from Paul Lynch, Jack Berry and Doran again. Late goals from Michael "Babs" Keating and Seán McLoughlin for Tipperary failed to stem the tide as Wexford secured a 5–8 to 3–12 victory. The victory gave Quigley his sole All-Ireland medal while he also had the honour of lifting the Liam MacCarthy Cup.

After surrendering their championship titles in 1969, Wexford regrouped the following year. A 4–16 to 3–14 defeat of old rivals Kilkenny in the very first 80-minute championship game gave Quigley a third Leinster medal. Wexford subsequently faced Cork in the All-Ireland decider on 6 September 1970. A record 64-point scoreline and eleven goals were produced in a sometimes ill-tempered and disappointing contest. Tony Doran top scored for Wexford with two goals, however, the day belonged to Eddie O'Brien who scored a hat-trick of goals for Cork from his hand. A 6–21 to 5–10 score line gave Cork the victory.

Quigley retired from inter-county hurling following the conclusion of the 1972 championship.

=== Inter-provincial ===
Quigley also lined out with Leinster in the inter-provincial series of games. In 1964, he was at full-back as Leinster faced Munster in the decider. A 3–7 to 2–9 victory gave him a Railway Cup medal.

After being off the team for a few seasons, Quigley won a second Railway Cup medal in 1967 following a 2–14 to 3–5 defeat of Munster once again.

After several years of Munster dominance, Leinster bounced back in 1971. A 2–17 to 2–12 defeat of Munster gave Quigley his third Railway Cup medal.

== Honours ==
Rathnure

- Leinster Senior Club Hurling Championship (3): 1971, 1973, 1977
- Wexford Senior Club Hurling Championship (9): 1961, 1967, 1971, 1972, 1973, 1974, 1977, 1979, 1980

Wexford

- All-Ireland Senior Hurling Championship (1): 1968 (c)
- Leinster Senior Hurling Championship (3): 1965, 1968 (c), 1970
- National Hurling League (1): 1966–67
- All-Ireland Under-21 Hurling Championship (1): 1965
- Leinster Under-21 Hurling Championship (2): 1964, 1965

Leinster

- Railway Cup (7): 1964, 1967, 1971

Sporting positions
Preceded by Jimmy O'Brien	Wexford Senior Hurling Captain; 1968	Succeeded by Tony Doran
Achievements
Preceded by Jim Treacy (Kilkenny)	All-Ireland Senior Hurling Final winning captain 1968	Succeeded by Eddie Keher (Kilkenny)
Awards
Preceded by Ollie Walsh (Kilkenny)	Texaco Hurler of the Year; 1968	Succeeded by Ted Carroll (Kilkenny)
