= Vinny Staples =

Irish hurler (born 1945)

Personal information
- Native name: Uinseann Mac an Ghaill (Irish)
- Born: 1945 (age 80–81) Piercestown, County Wexford, Ireland
- Height: 5 ft 6 in (168 cm)

Sport
- Sport: Hurling
- Position: Right wing-back
Club
- Years: Club
- St Martin's
Club titles
- Wexford titles: 0
Inter-county
- Years: County
- 1965-1974: Wexford
Inter-county titles
- Leinster titles: 2
- All-Irelands: 1
- NHL: 1
- All Stars: 0

Vincent "Vinny" Staples (born 1945) is an Irish former hurler who enjoyed a successful career as a right wing-back with the Wexford senior team.

Born in Piercestown, County Wexford, Staples was introduced to hurling in his youth. He experienced championship successes in the junior and intermediate grades with the St Martin's club.

Staples made his debut on the inter-county scene at the age of seventeen when he first linked up with the Wexford minor team. An All-Ireland medal winner in this grade, he later won an All-Ireland medal with the under-21 team. Staples made his senior debut during the 1965 championship. He went on to play a key role for Wexford in defence during a successful era, and won one All-Ireland medal, two Leinster medals and one National Hurling League medal. Staples was an All-Ireland runner-up on one occasion.

Staples retired from inter-county hurling following the conclusion of the 1974 championship.

== Honours ==
St Martin's

- Wexford Intermediate Hurling Championship (2): 1964, 1977
- Wexford Junior Hurling Championship (1): 1963

Wexford

- All-Ireland Senior Hurling Championship (1): 1968
- Leinster Senior Hurling Championship (4): 1965, 1968
- National Hurling League (1): 1966–67
- All-Ireland Under-21 Hurling Championship (1): 1965
- Leinster Under-21 Hurling Championship (3): 1964, 1965, 1966
- All-Ireland Minor Hurling Championship (1): 1963
- Leinster Minor Hurling Championship (1): 1963
