= Dave Bernie =

Irish hurler (born 1947)

Personal information
- Native name: Daithí Ó Beirn (Irish)
- Born: 19 October 1947 (age 79) Ferns, County Wexford, Ireland
- Occupation: Company Director
- Height: 5 ft 10 in (178 cm)

Sport
- Sport: Hurling and Football
- Position: Midfield
Clubs
- Years: Club
- 1957 - 1978 1979 - current: Ferns St Aidan's; Cuala
Club titles
- Dublin titles: 2
Inter-county
| Years | County | Apps (scores) |
| 1968-1978 | Wexford | 18 (0-19) |
Inter-county titles
- Leinster titles: 3
- All-Irelands: 1
- NHL: 1

David Bernie (born 19 October 1947) is an Irish retired hurling selector and former player who enjoyed a successful career as a midfielder with the Wexford senior hurling and football teams, playing at every grade along the way.

== Career ==
Bernie was educated at St Peter's College and lined out in all grades of hurling during his time there. He won a Leinster Colleges SHC medal before a 6-07 to 4-05 defeat by Limerick CBS in the 1964 All-Ireland colleges final.

At club level, Bernie first played with Ferns St Aidan's at juvenile and underage levels and was part of the club's minor team that won the Wexford MHC title in 1965. He progressed to adult level and won a Wexford IHC medal in 1979. Bernie's career eventually brought him to the Cuala club in Dublin. He was at full-forward when Cuala won their very first Dublin SHC title in 1989.

At inter-county level, Bernie first played for Wexford when he joined the senior team in 1968. He won a Leinster SHC that year before later claiming an All-Ireland SHC medal after lining out at midfield with Phil Wislon in the 5-08 to 3-12 victory over Tipperary in the 1968 All-Ireland final. Bernie won further Leinster SHC honours in 1970 and 1977, as well as a National Hurling League medal in 1973.

Performances at inter-county level for Wexford resulted in Bernie being called up to the Leinster inter-provincial team. He won a Railway Cup medals in 1971 following a defeat of Munster in the final.

== Management career ==
In retirement from playing, Bernie became involved in team management and coaching. He was a selector with the Wexford senior team from 1990 to 1995. They played in 3 league finals during this time. Dave coached the Down hurling team to an Ulster title in 1997. He was the Chairman of the Cuala Development Committee that raised funds to upgrade the hall and put the bar in place. David chaired the Cuala Hurling Committee that put structures in place in 1988/89. Dave was also on the coaching team for Cabinteely GAA's Junior Hurlers when they won their first Junior Hurling Championship in 1996.

== Honours ==
St Peter's College

- Leinster Colleges Senior Hurling Championship: 1964
- Leinster Colleges Senior Football Championship: 1965

Ferns St Aidan's

- Wexford Minor Hurling Championship: 1965
- Wexford Intermediate Hurling Championship: 1979

Cuala

- Coached and played to win Dublin Intermediate Football Championship: 1981
- Dublin Senior Hurling Championship: 1989

Wexford

- Played all grades of Hurling and Football with Wexford
- All-Ireland Senior Hurling Championship: 1968
- Leinster Senior Hurling Championship: 1968, 1970, 1977
- National Hurling League: 1972–73
- Wexford Hurler of the Year Award: 1971
- Oireachtas title:1978

Leinster

- Railway Cup: 1971
