= Séamus Whelan =

Irish hurler (born 1938)

Personal information
- Native name: Séamus Ó Faoileáin (Irish)
- Nickname: Shanks
- Born: 1938 (age 87–88) Piercetown, County Wexford, Ireland
- Occupation: Lab technician
- Height: 5 ft 8 in (173 cm)

Sport
- Sport: Hurling
- Position: Full-forward
Club
- Years: Club
- St Martin's
Inter-county
- Years: County
- 1962-1969: Wexford
Inter-county titles
- Leinster titles: 1
- All-Irelands: 1
- NHL: 1

Séamus Whelan (born 1938) is an Irish former hurler and Gaelic footballer. At club level, he played with St Martin's and at inter-county level with the Wexford county hurling team.

== Career ==
Whelan first played hurling and Gaelic football at club level with St Martin's. He won a Wexford JFC medal in 1957 before adding a Wexford JHC medal to his collection in 1963. Whelan won a Wexford IHC medal in 1964.

At inter-county level, Whelan first played for Wexford as part of the junior team that won the Leinster JHC title in 1959. He later won an All-Ireland IHC medal in 1961, before collecting a second winners' medal in that competition in 1964.

Whelan joined the senior team in 1962, however, he struggled to remain on the team due to injury. He also lined out with Wexford as a Gaelic footballer at junior and senior levels. Whelan's return to the senior team saw him win a National Hurling League medal in 1967. He added a Leinster SHC medal to his collection in 1968, before later winning an All-Ireland SHC medal after lining out at full-forward in the 5-08 to 3-12 victory over Tipperary.

== Honours ==
St Martin's

- Wexford Intermediate Hurling Championship: 1964
- Wexford Junior Hurling Championship: 1963
- Wexford Junior Football Championship: 1957

Wexford

- All-Ireland Senior Hurling Championship: 1968
- Leinster Senior Hurling Championship: 1968
- National Hurling League: 1966–67
- All-Ireland Intermediate Hurling Championship: 1961, 1964
- Leinster Intermediate Hurling Championship: 1961, 1964
- Leinster Junior Hurling Championship: 1959
