= 1971 Railway Cup Hurling Championship =

Irish hurling competition

- Dates: 21 February 1971 - 17 March 1971
- Teams: 4
- Champions: Leinster (12th title); Tony Doran (captain)
- Runners-up: Munster; Ray Cummins (captain)

Tournament statistics
- Matches played: 3
- Goals scored: 18 (6 per match)
- Points scored: 71 (23.67 per match)
- Top scorer(s): Eddie Keher (0-18)

The 1971 Railway Cup Hurling Championship was the 45th staging of the Railway Cup since its establishment by the Gaelic Athletic Association in 1927. The championship ended on 17 March 1971.

Munster were the defending champions.

On 17 March 1971, Leinster won the championship following a 2–17 to 2–12 defeat of Munster in the final. This was their 12th Railway Cup title and their first since 1967.

Leinster's Eddie Keher was the Railway Cup top scorer with 0-18.

== Results ==
Preliminary round

| 21 February 1971 Preliminary round | Ulster | 1-04 - 4-11 | Connacht | Casement Park, Belfast |
| | B McGarry 1-1, A McCallin 0-3. | | A Kenny 2-2, John Connolly 0-4, B O'Connor 1-0, A Fenton 1-0, P Fahy 0-2, P Mitchell 0-2, S Stanley 0-1. | Referee: C Foley (Dublin) |

Semi-final

| 28 February 1971 Semi-final | Leinster | 5-13 - 4-14 | Connacht | Páirc Chiaráin, Athlone |
| | T Doran 3-0, E Keher 0-9, M Bermingham 2-0, H Dalton 0-2, F Cummins 0-1, P Delaney 0-1. | | P Fahy 1-6, S Stanley 1-1, B O'Connor 1-0, A Fenton 1-0, S Hogan 0-3, P Mitchell 0-3, John Connolly 0-1. | Referee: S O'Connor (Limerick) |

Final

| 17 March 1971 Final | Munster | 2-12 - 2-17 | Leinster | Croke Park, Dublin |
| | R Cummins 1-1, N O'Dwyer 1-1, F Loughnane 0-4, M Roche 0-2, P Hegarty 0-2, PJ Ryan 0-1, J Flanagan 0-1. | | E Keher 0-9, M Bermingham 1-0, T Doran 1-0, D Bernie 0-2, F Cummins 0-2, H Dalton 0-2, P Delaney 0-1, J Quigley 0-1. | Attendance: 20,306; Referee: P Spain (Offaly) |

== Scoring statistics ==
Top scorers overall

| Rank | Player | Club | Tally | Total | Matches | Average |
|---|---|---|---|---|---|---|
| 1 | Eddie Keher | Leinster | 0-18 | 19 | 2 | 9.00 |
| 2 | Tony Doran | Leinster | 4-00 | 12 | 2 | 6.00 |
| 3 | Pádraic Fahy | Connacht | 1-08 | 11 | 2 | 5.50 |
| 4 | Mick Bermingham | Leinster | 3-00 | 9 | 2 | 4.50 |
| 5 | Andy Kenny | Connacht | 2-02 | 8 | 2 | 4.00 |

Top scorers in a single game

| Rank | Player | Club | Tally | Total | Opposition |
|---|---|---|---|---|---|
| 1 | Tony Doran | Leinster | 3-00 | 9 | Conancht |
| 1 | Pádraic Fahy | Conancht | 1-06 | 9 | Leinster |
| 1 | Eddie Keher | Leinster | 0-09 | 9 | Conancht |
| 1 | Eddie Keher | Leinster | 0-09 | 9 | Munster |
| 2 | Andy Kenny | Conancht | 2-02 | 8 | Leinster |
| 3 | Mick Bermingham | Leinster | 2-00 | 6 | Conancht |
| 4 | Brendan McGarry | Ulster | 1-01 | 4 | Conancht |
| 4 | Sam Stanley | Conancht | 1-01 | 4 | Leinster |
| 4 | Ray Cummins | Munster | 1-01 | 4 | Leinster |
| 4 | Noel O'Dwyer | Munster | 1-01 | 4 | Leinster |
| 4 | Francis Loughnane | Munster | 0-04 | 4 | Leinster |
| 4 | John Connolly | Connacht | 0-04 | 4 | Ulster |

== Bibliography ==
- Donegan, Des, The Complete Handbook of Gaelic Games (DBA Publications Limited, 2005).
