= Mick Waters (hurler) =

Irish hurler (1941–2024)

Personal information
- Native name: Mícheál Uítear (Irish)
- Born: 21 July 1941 Ballinlough, Cork, Ireland
- Died: 5 November 2024 (aged 83) Ballintemple, Cork, Ireland
- Occupation: Roman Catholic priest

Sport
- Sport: Hurling
- Position: Midfield
Club
- Years: Club
- 1961–1974: Blackrock
Club titles
- Cork titles: 1
College
- Years: College
- University College Cork
College titles
- Fitzgibbon titles: 1
Inter-county
Years	County	Apps (scores)
1966–1968	Cork	3 (0-00)
Inter-county titles
- Munster titles: 1
- All-Irelands: 1
- NHL: 0

Michael Waters (21 July 1941 – 5 November 2024) was an Irish hurler. At club level he played with Blackrock and was also a member of the Cork senior hurling team.

== Early life ==
Born and raised in Ballinlough on Cork's southside, Waters was educated at Christian Brothers College. Here he played rugby union as part of the college's junior and senior cup teams. Waters later studied at University College Cork and won a Fitzgibbon Cup medal in 1961.

== Club career ==
Waters began his club hurling career with Carrigmahon, the then-name for the underage section of the Blackrock club. He was part of the under-15 team that claimed a C-grade title in 1955. Waters later made his senior team debut and was at midfield when Blackrock claimed the Cork SHC title after beating Avondhu in the 1961 final. His clerical studies meant that his appearances for the team were sporadic over the following few years. Waters played his last competitive game for Blackrock when he came on as a substitute in a six-point defeat by St Finbarr's in the 1974 final.

== Inter-county career ==
Waters began his inter-county career with Cork as a member of the intermediate team in 1964. He won a Munster IHC that year, however, Cork were later beaten by Wexford in the 1964 All-Ireland home final. Waters made his senior team debut in a 4–09 to 2–09 defeat of Waterford in the 1966 Munster final. His second game for the team resulted in him claiming an All-Ireland SHC winners' medal after lining out at midfield in the 3–09 to 1–10 defeat of Kilkenny in the 1966 All-Ireland final. Waters was a substitute on the team the following year and played his last game for Cork in 1968.

== Personal life and death ==
After graduating from University College Cork, Waters joined the Society of Missionaries of Africa. He was ordained to the priesthood on 19 December 1966. Two years later he left Ireland for Nigeria, where he spent 47 years working and teaching in various dioceses.

Waters died on 5 November 2024, at the age of 83.

== Honours ==
University College Cork

- Fitzgibbon Cup: 1961

Blackrock

- Cork Senior Hurling Championship: 1961

Cork

- All-Ireland Senior Hurling Championship: 1966
- Munster Senior Hurling Championship: 1966
- Munster Intermediate Hurling Championship: 1964
