= Stephen Greene (hurler) =

Irish hurler (1944–2026)

Personal information
- Native name: Stiofán Ó hUainín (Irish)
- Nickname: Greener
- Born: 1944 Waterford, Ireland
- Died: 1 May 2026 (aged 81) Kinsale, County Cork, Ireland
- Occupation: Waterford Crystal employee

Sport
- Sport: Hurling
- Position: Left corner-forward
Club
- Years: Club
- Mount Sion
Club titles
- Waterford titles: 10
- Munster titles: 1
- All-Ireland Titles: 0
Inter-county
- Years: County
- Waterford
Inter-county titles
- Munster titles: 0
- All-Irelands: 0
- NHL: 0
- All Stars: 0

Stephen A. Greene (1944 – 1 May 2026) was an Irish hurler. At club level he played with Mount Sion and at inter-county level with the Waterford senior hurling team.

== Career ==
Greene first played hurling at juvenile and underage levels with Mount Sion and was part of the club's minor team that won the Waterford MHC title in 1962. He progressed to the club's senior team and won 10 Waterford SHC medals between 1963 and 1986, when he captained the team. Greene also won a Munster Club SHC and was in goal for Mount Sion's 3–13 to 3–08 defeat by James Stephens in the 1982 All-Ireland Club SHC final.

At inter-county level, Greene was Waterford's top scorer with 5–01 in the 1964 Munster U21HC. He later lined out with the senior team and captained the team in 1973. Greene was also selected for Munster's Railway Cup team in 1973.

== Personal life and death ==
His father, Paddy Greene, was part of the Waterford team beaten by Dublin in the 1938 All-Ireland SHC final. His brother, Jim Greene, also played for Mount Sion and Waterford, while his nephew, Brian Greene, won a Munster SHC medal with Waterford in 2002.

Greene died on 1 May 2026, at the age of 81.

== Honours ==
Mount Sion

- Munster Senior Club Hurling Championship (1): 1981
- Waterford Senior Hurling Championship (10): 1963, 1964, 1965, 1969, 1972, 1974, 1975, 1981, 1983, 1986 (c)
- Waterford Minor Hurling Championship (1): 1962

Sporting positions
| Preceded by Martin Hickey | Waterford senior hurling team captain 1973 | Succeeded by Martin Hickey |
