= Colm Doran =

Irish hurler

Personal information
- Native name: Colm Ó Deoráin (Irish)
- Born: Boolavogue, County Wexford

Sport
- Sport: Hurling
- Position: Corner-back
Club
- Years: Club
- 1967-1986: Buffer's Alley
Club titles
- Wexford titles: 8
- Leinster titles: 1
- All-Ireland Titles: 0
Inter-county
- Years: County
- 1969-1982: Wexford
Inter-county titles
- Leinster titles: 2
- All-Irelands: 0
- NHL: 1
- All Stars: 1

Colm Doran (born 1949 in Boolavogue, County Wexford) is a retired Irish sportsperson. He played hurling with his local club Buffer's Alley and with the Wexford senior inter-county team from 1969 until 1982.

== Playing career ==
=== Club ===
Doran played his club hurling with the Buffer's Alley club in Wexford. He won his first senior county title in 1968, the first time that the club had been victorious in the county final. Doran added a second county medal to his collection in 1970 before capturing back-to-back county titles in 1975 and 1976. It would be 1982 before he won his next county title, his fifth in total. This victory began a run of success for Buffer's Alley who won four county champions in-a-row. The last of these county victories was later converted into a Leinster club title following a victory over Kinnitty. Doran later lined out in the All-Ireland club final, however, Buffer's Alley were defeated by Kilruane MacDonagh's of Tipperary on that occasion. Doran retired from club hurling shortly afterwards.

=== Inter-county ===
Doran first came to prominence on the inter-county scene as a member of the Wexford under-21 team in the late 1960s. He won a Leinster title in this grade in 1969 before later lining out in his first All-Ireland final. Cork provided the opposition on that occasion and won the game by 5-13 to 4-7. Doran added a second Leinster under-21 title to his collection in 1970 before later playing in his second consecutive All-Ireland final. Once again Cork provided the opposition, however, the game ended in a draw. The replay proved more conclusive as Cork beat Doran's side by 5-17 to 0-8.

Doran subsequently joined the Wexford senior team where his brother, Tony Doran, already played in the forward line. He played in his first Leinster final in 1971. Kilkenny provided the opposition on that occasion - in what was the first of five successive defeats at the hands of Kilkenny in Leinster finals for Wexford; however, Doran missed the 1972 decider.

Wexford reached the final of the National Hurling League in 1973. On that occasion Limerick were the opponents, with victory going to Wexford and giving Doran his first major title at senior level.

1976 saw Wexford and Kilkenny battle it out in the Leinster final for the seventh year in succession. ‘The Cats’ were going for a provincial six in-a-row and an All-Ireland three-in-a-row, however, Wexford beat the reigning champions by 2-20 to 1-6. This win gave Doran his first Leinster medal. Wexford's championship campaign nearly came unstuck in their next game against Galway. A high-scoring game ended in a 5-14 to 2-23 draw and a replay was forced. In the second/replayed game, Wexford emerged victorious by 3-14 to 2-14. Their opponents in the All-Ireland final were Cork, a team looking for their first championship title since 1970. Doran's led initially by 2-2 to no score after just six minutes, however, Cork settled down and the sides were level at the interval. Cork ultimately hung on to win by 2-21 to 4-11 as Doran was left on the losing side.

In 1977 Wexford maintained their provincial dominance with another defeat of Kilkenny. It was Doran's second Leinster medal and the defeat for ‘the Cats’ brought the curtain down on Eddie Keher’s inter-county career. Victory in the provincial final allowed Wexford to advance directly to the All-Ireland final. For the second year in-a-row Cork provided the opposition. Wet and windy weather severely hampered both teams, however, the game was still a close affair. For the second year in-a-row Doran ended up on the losing side as Cork claimed a 1-17 to 3-8 victory.

In 1978 Kilkenny were back as champions of Leinster and Wexford had to go back to the drawing board. A new force in the province also emerged as Offaly won their first Leinster titles in 1980 and 1981. Doran retired from inter-county hurling shortly afterwards.

=== Provincial ===
Doran also lined out with Leinster in the inter-provincial hurling competition. He first played for his province in 1974 as Leinster defeated Munster to take the Railway Cup. Doran added further Railway Cup medals to his collection in 1975, 1977 and 1979.

== Post-playing career ==
Not long after his playing days were over the Gaelic Athletic Association celebrated its centenary year in 1984. Throughout the year a series of special events were held while special team selections were also named. While a special GAA Hurling Team of the Century was named, a special team of players who never won an All-Ireland medal was also selected. Doran's skill as a player was recognised when he was picked in the left wing-back position on that team.
