= 1961 All-Ireland Intermediate Hurling Championship =

Championship Details
- Dates: 2 April – 17 September 1961
- Teams: 14

All Ireland Champions
- Winners: Wexford (1st win)
- Captain: Larry Byrne

All Ireland Runners-up
- Runners-up: London
- Captain: Willie Dorgan

Provincial Champions
- Munster: Tipperary
- Leinster: Wexford
- Ulster: Not Played
- Connacht: Not Played

Championship Statistics
- Matches Played: 14
- Total Goals: 106 (7.57 per game)
- Total Points: 232 (16.57 per game)
- Top Scorer: Johnny Walsh (5-18)

The 1961 All-Ireland Intermediate Hurling Championship was the inaugural staging of the All-Ireland Intermediate Hurling Championship. The championship ran from 2 April to 17 September 1961.

The All-Ireland final was played at Wexford Park on 17 September 1961 between Wexford and London, in what was their first ever championship meeting. Wexford won the match by 3-15 to 4-04 to claim their first ever All-Ireland title.

Wexford's Johnny Walsh was the championship's top scorer with 5-18.

== Leinster Intermediate Hurling Championship ==
=== Leinster quarter-finals ===
2 April 1961 Quarter-final	Dublin	2-10 - 2-05	Antrim	Croke Park
	C Ryan 1-3, M Bermingham 1-0, M Dempsey 0-2, P Dunphy 0-2, S Ryan 0-1, J Kirwan 0-1, B Cooney 0-1.		O Campbell 2-0, P Mullaney 0-2, F Walsh 0-1, B McGurk 0-1, B Donnelly 0-1.

16 April 1961 Quarter-final	Kilkenny	4-07 - 6-10	Wexford	Nowlan Park
	J Doyle 2-1, E Doyle 1-1, M Carroll 1-0, M Henderson 0-1, T Ryan 0-1.		J Coady 2-1, J Phelan 2-0, J Walsh 1-3, A Doyle 1-2, L Creane 0-3, N Newport 0-1.

21 May 1961 Quarter-final	Carlow	8-16 - 2-04	Offaly	Dr. Cullen Park
	Black W Walsh 2-6, J McCarthy 2-1, E Long 2-0, Red W Walsh 1-3, Fortune 1-3, M Morrissey 0-1, P McGovern 0-1, McGovern 0-1.		J Troy 1-0, T Dooley 0-3, M Healion 0-1.

=== Leinster semi-final ===
11 June 1961 Semi-final	Westmeath	2-10 - 3-09	Dublin	Cusack Park
	P O'Loughlin 1-4, P McDonnell 1-0, M Garland 0-1, V Newman 0-1, M Carey 0-1, R Carey 0-1, T Carrigy 0-1, J Keary 0-1.		M Dempsey 1-2, S Ryan 1-2, J Kirwan 1-0, M Bermingham 0-3, W Barry 0-1, C Ryan 0-1.

9 July 1961 Semi-final	Wexford	6-08 - 3-07	Carlow	O'Kennedy Park
	J Walsh 2-2, J Coady 1-4, P Lynch 2-0, L Byrne 1-0, S Whelan 0-2.		J McCarthy 2-3, M Morrissey 1-1, Black W Walsh 0-2, Red W Walsh 0-1.

=== Leinster final ===
30 July 1961 Final	Wexford	3-11 - 2-10	Dublin	Croke Park
	S Whelan 2-2, J Walsh 1-4, T Hawkins 0-3, L Creane 0-1, P Lynch 0-1.		M Bermingham 1-4, S Ryan 1-1, B Cooney 0-3, N Dempsey 0-2.

== Munster Intermediate Hurling Championship ==
=== Munster quarter-finals ===
30 April 1961 Quarter-final	Clare	1-05 - 4-07	Tipperary	Cusack Park
	T Vaughan 1-0, J Kelly 0-3, J Cullinan 0-2.		T Flynn 2-1, T Larkin 2-0, B Ryan 0-4, L Tierney 0-1, M Fahy 0-1.

14 May 1961 Quarter-final	Cork	8-10 - 2-06	Limerick	Bishop Casey Memorial Park
	R Sisk 5-0, R Browne 1-3, T Furlong 1-1, S Fitzgerald 1-0, C O'Shea 0-3, W Walsh 0-1, P Fitzgerald 0-1, B Ahern 0-1.		P Salmon 1-3, J Fitzgerald 1-0, P Benson 0-2, P Kelleher 0-1.

=== Munster semi-finals ===
28 May 1961 Semi-final	Waterford	3-07 - 4-10	Tipperary	Walsh Park
	R Tobin 2-2, P Kenneally 1-3, B Foley 0-1, J Butler 0-1.		John McGrath 3-1, T Larkin 0-4, D Ryan 0-4, P Dwyer 1-0, J Flynn 0-1.

4 June 1961 Semi-final	Cork	7-04 - 5-03	Galway	Gaelic Grounds
	R Browne 2-1, R Sisk 2-0, C O'Shea 1-1, T Furlong 1-1, J Fitzgerald 1-0, J Pearse 0-1.		M Hoare 2-0, M Curtin 2-0, J O'Mahony 1-2, M Lynch 0-1.

=== Munster final ===
25 June 1961 Final	Tipperary	3-10 - 2-12	Cork	Thurles Sportsfield
	T Larkin 3-2, D Ryan 0-2, M McGovern 0-2, M Keating 0-2, T O'Dwyer 0-1, T O'Flynn 0-1.		R Browne 1-6, F Furlong 1-0, L Walsh 0-3, R Sisk 0-3.

== All-Ireland Intermediate Hurling Championship ==
=== All-Ireland home final ===
13 August 1961 Home final	Wexford	5-06 - 5-06	Tipperary	Nowlan Park
	P Lynch 1-3, J Walsh 1-1, L Crean 1-0, M Redmond 1-0, M Newport 1-0, T Hawkins 0-1, S Whelan 0-1.		S McGovern 2-1, John McGrath 1-2, Jim McGrath 1-1, M Keating 1-0, D Ryan 0-2.

20 August 1961 Home final replay	Wexford	4-11 - 3-09	Tipperary	Nowlan Park
	L Creane 2-0, P Lynch 0-6, N Newport 1-1, M Redmond 1-0, J Walsh 0-3, J Whelan 0-1.		J McGovern 1-2, T Larkin 1-1, L Tierney 0-4, L O'Grady 1-0, Jim McGrath 0-2.

=== All-Ireland final ===
17 September 1961 Final	Wexford	3-15 - 4-04	London	Wexford Park
	P Lynch 1-6, J Walsh 0-5, T Hawkins 1-1, S Whelan 1-0, J Coady 0-2, J Creane 0-1.		J Redmond 1-1, L Healy 1-0, P Ryan 1-0, J Kiely 1-0, W Duffy 0-2, P Egan 0-1.	Referee: C Foley (Dublin)

== Championship statistics ==
=== Top scorers ===
Overall

Rank	Player	Club	Tally	Total	Matches	Average
1	Johnny Walsh	Wexford	5-18	33	6	5.50
2	Paul Lynch	Wexford	4-16	28	6	4.66
3	Tom Larkin	Tipperary	6-07	25	5	5.00
4	Ray Sisk	Cork	7-03	24	3	8.00
5	Richie Browne	Cork	4-10	22	3	7.33
6	Jim McCarthy	Carlow	4-04	16	2	8.00
6	John Coady	Wexford	3-07	16	6	2.66
8	Johnny McGrath	Tipperary	4-03	15	5	3.00
9	Séamus Whelan	Wexford	3-05	14	6	2.33
9	Larry Creane	Wexford	3-05	14	6	2.33
9	Seán McGovern	Tipperary	3-05	14	5	2.80
9	"Black" Willie Walsh	Carlow	2-08	14	2	7.00

In a single game

Rank	Player	Club	Tally	Total	Opposition
1	Ray Sisk	Cork	5-00	15	Limerick
2	"Black" Willie Walsh	Carlow	2-06	12	Offaly
3	Tom Larkin	Tipperary	3-02	11	Cork
3	Johnny McGrath	Tipperary	3-01	11	Waterford
5	Jim McCarthy	Carlow	2-03	9	Wexford
5	Paul Lynch	Wexford	1-06	9	London
5	Richie Browne	Cork	1-06	9	Tipperary
8	Dick Tobin	Waterford	2-02	8	Tipperary
8	Johnny Walsh	Wexford	2-02	8	Carlow
8	Séamus Whelan	Wexford	2-02	8	Dublin
