= Con Dowdall =

Irish hurler

Personal information
- Native name: Conn Dúdal (Irish)
- Born: 1945 (age 80–81) Wexford, Ireland

Sport
- Sport: Hurling
- Position: Right wing-forward
Club
- Years: Club
- Faythe Harriers
Club titles
- Wexford titles: 2
Inter-county*
Years	County	Apps (scores)
1965-1971	Wexford	4 (0-00)
Inter-county titles
- Leinster titles: 1
- All-Irelands: 0
- NHL: 0
- *Inter County team apps and scores correct as of 18:54, 5 July 2014.

Con Dowdall (born 1945) is an Irish retired hurler who played as a right wing-forward for the Wexford senior team.

Born in Wexford, Dowdall first arrived on the inter-county scene at the age of seventeen two when he first linked up with the Wexford minor team, before later joining the under-21 side. He made his senior debut during the 1965 championship. Dowdall went on to play a bit part for Wexford over the next few years and won one Leinster medal.

At club level Dowdall won two championship medals with Faythe Harriers.

Throughout his inter-county career, Dowdall made just 4 championship appearances for Wexford. His retirement came following the conclusion of the 1971 championship.

His brother-in-law, Liam Bennett, also played with Wexford.

== Honours ==
=== Team ===
Faythe Harriers

- Wexford Senior Hurling Championship (2): 1965, 1981

Wexford

- Leinster Senior Hurling Championship (1): 1965
- All-Ireland Under-21 Hurling Championship (1): 1965
- Leinster Under-21 Hurling Championship (2): 1965, 1966
- All-Ireland Minor Hurling Championship (1): 1963
- Leinster Minor Hurling Championship (2): 1963
