= Paddy Greene (hurler) =

Irish hurler

Patrick Greene (1916 – 17 September 1997) was an Irish hurler. At club level he played for Mount Sion, winning several Waterford Senior Championship titles, and was a substitute on the Waterford senior hurling team that lost the 1938 All-Ireland final. His sons, Stephen and Jim, and his grandson, Brian, also played with Waterford.
