= Willie Murphy (Wexford hurler) =

Irish hurler (born 1944)

Personal information
- Native name: Liam Ó Murchú (Irish)
- Born: Wexford, Ireland

Sport
- Sport: Hurling
- Position: Full-back
Club
- Years: Club
- Faythe Harriers
Club titles
- Wexford titles: 2
Inter-county
- Years: County
- 1965-1979: Wexford
Inter-county titles
- Leinster titles: 5
- All-Irelands: 1
- All Stars: 1

Willie Murphy (born 1944 in Wexford, Ireland) is a retired Irish sportsperson. He played hurling with his local club Faythe Harriers and with the Wexford senior inter-county team from 1965 until 1979.
