= 1964 All-Ireland Intermediate Hurling Championship =

All Ireland Champions
- Winners: Wexford (2nd win)

All Ireland Runners-up
- Runners-up: London

Provincial Champions
- Munster: Cork
- Leinster: Wexford
- Ulster: Not Played
- Connacht: Not Played

The 1964 All-Ireland Intermediate Hurling Championship was the fourth staging of the All-Ireland Intermediate Hurling Championship since its establishment by the Gaelic Athletic Association in 1961.

Tipperary entered the championship as the defending champions, however, they were beaten by Galway in the Munster quarter-final.

The All-Ireland final was played at St. Patrick's Park in Enniscorthy on 20 September 1964 between Wexford and London, in what was their second ever All-Ireland final meeting and a first in three years. Wexford won the match by 4–07 to 1–11 to claim their second All-Ireland title overall and a first title in three years.

== Munster Intermediate Hurling Championship ==
=== Munster quarter-finals ===
26 April 1964 Quarter-final	Kerry	4-10 - 3-02	Limerick	Austin Stack Park
	M Hennessy 2-3, D Lovett 1-3, J McCarthy 1-2, R McElligott 0-1, T Kenny 0-1.		M Savage 2-0, M Geary 1-0, D O'Grady 0-1, J Begley 0-1.

3 May 1964 Quarter-final	Galway	1-08 - 1-03	Tipperary	Pearse Stadium
	T Fahy 1-0, P Jordan 0-4, J Egan 0-1, J Corcoran 0-1, G Lohan 0-1, P Egan 0-1.		J Ryan 1-0, M Nugent 0-2, P Dwyer 0-1.

10 May 1964 Quarter-final	Clare	3-04 - 1-07	Waterford	Cusack Park
	M Keane 2-0, M Barry 1-1, J McNamara 0-1, M McMahon 0-1, M McMahon 0-1.		J O'Brien 1-2, W Walsh 0-2, J Whelan 0-2, J Kirwan 0-1.

=== Munster semi-finals ===
7 June 1964 Semi-final	Galway	3-08 - 2-01	Clare	Gaelic Grounds
	P Jordan 2-0, S Carr 1-1, JJ Egan 0-4, P Fahy 0-2, L Duffy 0-1.		N Pyne 1-1, M Barry 1-0.

12 July 1964 Semi-final	Cork	4-15 - 2-12	Kerry	Castle Grounds
	W Fitton 2-3, J McCarthy 0-8, P O'Brien 1-1, M Meaney 1-1, P Behan 0-2.		J Culloty 1-7, J Barry 1-2, M Kennedy 0-2, E Sullivan 0-1.	Referee: L Lowry

=== Munster final ===
2 August 1964 Final	Galway	1-10 - 4-14	Cork	Duggan Park
	T Egan 1-4, C Muldoon 0-3, S Devlin 0-2, P Jordan 0-1.		J McCarthy 2-0, T Savage 1-2, J White 0-5, C Sheehan 1-1, W Fitton 0-3, G Holland 0-3.	Referee: J Smyth (Clare)

== All-Ireland Intermediate Hurling Championship ==
=== All-Ireland home final ===
16 August 1964 Home final	Wexford	2-08 - 1-05	Cork	Walsh Park
	S Whelan 1-5, L Kehoe 1-1, M Kennedy 0-1, O Cullen 0-1.		D O'Brien 1-1, T Savage 0-2, W Fitton 0-1, C Sheehan 0-1.

=== All-Ireland final ===
20 September 1964 Final	Wexford	4-07 - 1-11	London	St. Patrick's Park
	S Whelan 2-5, L Delaney 1-0, L Kehoe 1-0, O Cullen 0-2.		E Murray 0-6, L Furlong 1-0, A Connolly 0-3, T Connolly 0-1, M Devereux 0-1.
