= Tony Doran =

Irish hurler

Personal information
- Native name: Tónaí Ó Deoráin (Irish)
- Born: 4 April 1946 (age 80) Boolavogue, County Wexford
- Occupation: Farmer
- Height: 6 ft 0 in (183 cm)

Sport
- Sport: Hurling
- Position: Full-forward
Club
- Years: Club
- 1963–1993: Buffer's Alley
Club titles
- Wexford titles: 12
- Leinster titles: 3
- All-Ireland Titles: 1
Inter-county*
Years	County	Apps (scores)
1967–1984	Wexford	40 (40–56)
Inter-county titles
- Leinster titles: 4
- All-Irelands: 1
- NHL: 2
- All Stars: 1
- *Inter County team apps and scores correct as of 00:06, 25 May 2023.

Anthony Doran (born April 1946) is an Irish retired hurler who played as a full-forward for the Wexford senior team. Doran won an All-Ireland title both for his county and club.

Born in Boolavogue, County Wexford, Doran first arrived on the inter-county scene at the age of seventeen when he first linked up with the Wexford minor team, before later joining the under-21 side. He joined the senior panel during the 1964–65 National League. Doran went on to play a key part for the team over the next two decades, and won one All-Ireland medal, four Leinster medals and two National Hurling League medals. He was an All-Ireland runner-up on three occasions.

As a member of the Leinster inter-provincial team on a number of occasions, Doran won seven Railway Cup medals. At club level he is a one-time All-Ireland medallist with Buffer's Alley. In addition to this he also won three Leinster medals and twelve championship medals in a career that spanned thirty years.

Doran's career tally of 41 goals and 57 points marks him out as Wexford's second highest championship scorer of all-time.

Throughout his inter-county career, Doran made 40 championship appearances for Wexford. His retirement came following the conclusion of the 1984 championship.

His brother, Colm, also enjoyed a lengthy career with Wexford.

Doran has been voted on to teams made up of the sport's greats, and was chosen at full-forward on the All-Ireland club hurling silver jubilee team in 1996, before later claiming the same position on a specially-chosen greatest ever Wexford side in 2002.

== Playing career ==
=== Club ===
Doran began his club career playing at underage levels with Moonageer-Boolavogue, before later joining the Buffer's Alley in the late sixties.

In 1968 Doran won his first championship medal following a defeat of Faythe Harriers. It was the club's first ever championship title.

After surrendering their championship crown in 1969, Buffer's Alley reclaimed the title in 1970. It was Doran's second championship medal.

Buffer's Alley quickly became one of the dominant forces in club hurling in Wexford. After a defeat in the championship decider in 1973, the club went on to claim back-to-back titles in 1975 and 1976.

After a period of uncertainty Buffer's Alley bounced back in 1982 to begin a remarkable run of success. Defeats of Oulart-the Ballagh, St. Martin's and Faythe Harriers (twice) secured four successive championships. These wins brought Doran's medal tally to an impressive eight. The last of these victories was converted into provincial success, with Doran collecting a Leinster medal following a 3–9 to 0–7 defeat of Kinnitty. Buffer's Alley later faced Kilruane MacDonaghs in the All-Ireland decider on 16 March 1986. A close game developed, however, five rallying points from Jim Williams helped Kilruane to a narrow 1–15 to 2–10 victory.

Doran won a ninth championship medal in 1988 as Buffer's Alley put a halt to Rathnure's quest for a third successive title. He later collected a second Leinster medal as Ballyhale Shamrocks were defeated by 1–12 to 1–9. O'Donovan Rossa provided the opposition in the subsequent All-Ireland final on 17 March 1989. Rossa's five-point lead was hauled back with a Séamus O'Leary goal while Henry Butler was the hero in goal. A 2–12 to 0–12 victory gave 42-year-old Doran an All-Ireland Senior Club Hurling Championship medal.

A tenth championship medal was collected by Doran in 1989, before later claiming his eleventh and twelfth titles with back-to-back victories in 1991 and 1992. The latter victory was later converted into a third Leinster medal following a 2–13 t 0–13 defeat of St. Rynagh's.

Doran retired from club hurling in 1993 following a junior championship final.

=== Inter-county ===
Doran joined the Wexford minor hurling team as a seventeen-year-old in 1963. He won a Leinster medal that year following a high-scoring 6–10 to 6–8 defeat of nine-in-a-row chasing Kilkenny team. The subsequent All-Ireland decider against Limerick was also a high-scoring affair, however, 6–12 to 5–9 victory gave Doran an All-Ireland medal.

Two years later in 1965 Doran was a key member of the Wexford under-21 team. A 7–9 to 1–5 trouncing of Dublin gave him his first Leinster medal in that grade. Reigning champions Tipperary were the opponents in the subsequent All-Ireland final, however, a 3–7 to 1–4 victory gave Doran an All-Ireland medal.

Wexford retained their provincial crown in 1966, with Doran collecting a second Leinster medal following a 7–10 to 2–8 demolition of Laois. The subsequent All-Ireland decider saw Cork providing the opposition. After a high-scoring hour of hurling Wexford scored 5–6 to Cork's 3–12 resulting in a draw. The replay was also a close affair with the sides finishing level again at 4–9 apiece. A third game produced the eventual winner as Wexford were defeated by 9–9 to 5–9.

By this stage Doran had already joined the Wexford senior team. He claimed his first silverware with a National Hurling League medal in 1967 following a 3–10 to 1–9 defeat of Kilkenny. Doran made his championship debut on 25 June 1967 in a 6–10 to 1–6 Leinster semi-final defeat of Laois.

Doran won his first Leinster medal in the senior grade in 1968 following a 3–13 to 4–9 defeat of reigning provincial and All-Ireland champions Kilkenny. This victory allowed Wexford to advance to an All-Ireland final against Tipperary, the outstanding team of the decade, on 1 September 1968. All was going to plan for Tipperary as they took a 1–11 to 1–3 lead at half-time. In one of the great All-Ireland comebacks, Doran got Wexford back on track with a goal six minutes after the interval. Three more goals followed from Paul Lynch, Jack Berry and Doran again. Late goals from Michael "Babs" Keating and Seán McLoughlin for Tipp failed to stem the tide as Wexford secured a 5–8 to 3–12 victory. It was Doran's first All-Ireland medal.

After surrendering their championship titles in 1969, Wexford regrouped the following year. A 4–16 to 3–14 defeat of old rivals Kilkenny in the very first 80-minute championship game gave Doran a second Leinster medal. Wexford subsequently faced Cork in the All-Ireland decider on 6 September 1970. A record 64-point scoreline and eleven goals were produced in a sometimes ill-tempered and disappointing contest. Doran top scored for Wexford with two goals, however, the day belonged to Eddie O'Brien who scored a hat-trick of goals for Cork from his hand. A remarkable 6–21 to 5–10 score line gave Cork the victory.

Doran won a second National League medal in 1973 following a 4–13 to 3–7 defeat of Limerick.

After a five-year period of Kilkenny dominance Wexford broke through in 1976. A 2–20 to 1–6 trouncing gave Doran, who was now captain of the team, a third Leinster medal. Cork provided the opposition in the subsequent All-Ireland final on 5 September 1976. Wexford got off to a strong start and were 2–2 to no score ahead after just six minutes. Wexford had a two-point lead with ten minutes to go, however, three points from Jimmy Barry-Murphy, two from Pat Moylan and a kicked effort from Ray Cummins gave Cork a 2–21 to 4–11 victory. In spite of this defeat Doran was later presented with his sole All-Star as well as being named Texaco Hurler of the Year.

Doran was Wexford captain again in 1977 as he collected his fourth Leinster medal following a 3–17 to 3–14 defeat of Kilkenny. The All-Ireland final on 4 September 1977 was a repeat of the previous year, with Cork providing the opposition once again. Seánie O'Leary score the decisive goal for Cork as the game entered the last quarter, while Martin Coleman brought off a match-winning save from Christy Keogh to foil the Wexford comeback. A 1–17 to 3–8 defeat was Doran's lot as he endured a second successive year as the All-Ireland runner-up captain.

Wexford went into decline following this defeat as Kilkenny and Offaly emerged as the dominant teams in Leinster. Doran played his last game for Wexford in a 1–15 to 2–11 Leinster decider defeat by Offaly on 8 July 1984. He retired from inter-county hurling following this defeat.

=== Inter-provincial ===
Doran was also picked for the Leinster inter-provincial team on many occasions between 1968 and 1979.

Between 1971 and 1975 Leinster enjoyed their greatest ever period of success. Five consecutive defeats of fierce rivals Munster, with Doran at full-forward, gave him his first five Railway Cup medals.

After a brief hiatus in 1976, Doran collected his sixth Railway Cup medal in 1977 following a 2–17 to 1–13 defeat of Munster once again.

Doran won his seventh and final Railway Cup medal in 1979, as Connacht were bested by 1–13 to 1–9.

== Career statistics ==
Team	Year	National League			Leinster		All-Ireland		Total	
Team	Year	Division	Apps	Score	Apps	Score	Apps	Score	Apps	Score
Wexford	1966-67	Division 1A	6	9-06	2	1-02	—		8	10-08
Wexford	1967-68	Division 1A	6	5-03	2	4-02	1	2-01	11	11-06
Wexford	1968-69	Division 1A	7	5-03	1	2-03	—		8	7-06
Wexford	1969-70	Division 1A	4	2-02	2	4-01	2	3-00	8	9-03
Wexford	1970-71	Division 1A	8	6-11	2	3-02	—		10	9-13
Wexford	1971-72	Division 1A	2	2-02	3	2-09	—		5	4-11
Wexford	1972-73	Division 1A	11	7-11	2	2-02	—		13	9-13
Wexford	1973-74	Division 1A	5	1-02	1	0-04	—		6	1-06
Wexford	1974-75	Division 1A	6	4-00	2	1-02	—		8	5-02
Wexford	1975-76	Division 1A	7	4-05	2	1-07	3	4-02	12	9-14
Wexford	1976-77	Division 1A	5	2-05	2	3-05	1	1-00	8	6-10
Wexford	1977-78	Division 1A	9	4-09	2	0-01	—		11	4-10
Wexford	1978-79	Division 1A	4	0-05	1	1-01	—		5	1-06
Wexford	1979-80	Division 1B	4	3-06	1	1-01	—		5	4-07
Wexford	1980-81	Division 1A	7	4-05	3	2-06	—		10	6-11
Wexford	1981-82	Division 1B	5	2-01	1	0-00	—		6	2-01
Wexford	1982-83	Division 1	7	5-06	2	2-02	—		9	7-08
Wexford	1983-84	Division 1	1	0-00	2	1-03	—		3	1-03
Total			106	65-82	33	30-53	7	10-03	146	105-138

== Honours ==
=== Team ===
Buffer's Alley

- All-Ireland Senior Club Hurling Championship (1): 1989
- Leinster Senior Club Hurling Championship (3): 1985, 1988, 1992
- Wexford Senior Club Hurling Championship (12): 1968, 1970, 1975, 1976, 1982, 1983, 1984, 1985, 1988, 1989, 1991, 1992

Wexford

- All-Ireland Senior Hurling Championship (1): 1968
- Leinster Senior Hurling Championship (4): 1968, 1970, 1976 (c), 1977 (c)
- National Hurling League (2): 1966–67, 1972–73
- All-Ireland Under-21 Hurling Championship (1): 1965
- Leinster Under-21 Hurling Championship (2): 1965, 1966
- All-Ireland Minor Hurling Championship (1): 1963
- Leinster Minor Hurling Championship (1): 1963

Leinster

- Railway Cup (7): 1971, 1972, 1973, 1974, 1975, 1977, 1979

=== Individual ===
Honours

- Texaco Hurler of the Year (1): 1976
- All-Star (1): 1976
- Cú Chulainn Award (1): 1967
- GAA Hall of Fame Inductee: 2016
- The 125 greatest stars of the GAA: No. 48
- Greatest Wexford Team: Full-forward
- All-Ireland Senior Club Hurling Championship Silver Jubilee Team: Full-forward
- In May 2020, the Irish Independent named Doran at number nineteen in its "Top 20 hurlers in Ireland over the past 50 years".

Sporting positions
Preceded by Teddy O'Connor	Wexford Senior Hurling Captain; 1976–1977	Succeeded by
Awards
Preceded by Liam "Chunky" O'Brien (Kilkenny)	Texaco Hurler of the Year; 1976	Succeeded by Denis Coughlan (Cork)
