= 1972 All-Ireland Senior Club Hurling Championship final =

1972 All-Ireland Senior Club Hurling Final
- Event: 1971–72 All-Ireland Senior Club Hurling Championship
Blackrock	Rathnure
5–13	6–9
- Date: 14 May 1972
- Venue: Walsh Park, Waterford
- Referee: Noel Dalton (Waterford)
- Attendance: 1,500

The 1972 All-Ireland Senior Club Hurling Championship final was a hurling match played at Walsh Park on 14 May 1972 to determine the winners of the 1971–72 All-Ireland Senior Club Hurling Championship, the second season of the All-Ireland Senior Club Hurling Championship, a tournament organised by the Gaelic Athletic Association for the champion clubs of the four provinces of Ireland. The final was contested by Blackrock of Cork and Rathnure of Wexford, with Blackrock winning by 5–13 to 6–9.

The All-Ireland final between Blackrock and Rathnure was a unique occasion as it was the first ever championship meeting between the two teams. Both sides were appearing in their first All-Ireland final.

In a high-scoring hour of hurling Blackrock survived a late rally by Rathnure to take the All-Ireland title to Cork for the first time. The Leinster champions were in arrears by twelve points at one stage, however, the Rathnure men launched a stunning comeback to cut the deficit down to one point. Two of the scores, a goal and a point, came in the last two minutes of play. The match was not without its talking points. Many of the Rathnure supporters felt that the full sixty minutes had not been played. Similarly, there was a dispute over a first-half point for Blackrock. Referee Noel Dalton awarded the score after both the umpires failed to reach an agreement. In spite of this Blackrock retired at half-time with a deserved 4–5 to 3–4 lead. Rathnure fought back, however, they squandered some easy chances as Blackrock stubbornly held on. It was a star-studded affair with the Rathnure team having eight inter-county players on the team. Blackrock also had more than their fair share of inter-county stars and held on for a one-point win after an eleven-goal thriller.

== Match ==
=== Details ===
14 May 1972

Blackrock	5–13 – 6–9	Rathnure
J Rothwell (3–1), P Moylan (0–8), D Prendergast (2–0), D Collins (0–3), R Cummins (0–1).		D Quigley (2–4), S Barron (2–0), J English (1–0), M Quigley (1–0), T O'Connor (0–2), M Byrne (0–1), J Murphy (0–1), P Flynn (0–1).

Walsh Park
Attendance: 1,500
Referee: N Dalton (Waterford)

Blackrock	Rathnure
