= Johnny McGrath =

Irish hurler (1931–2019)

Personal information
- Native name: Seánie Mac Craith (Irish)
- Born: 1931 Nenagh, County Tipperary
- Died: 5 June 2019 (aged 87–88)

Sport
- Sport: Hurling
- Position: Left half-back
Club
- Years: Club
- 1940s–1960s: Nenagh Éire Óg
Club titles
- Tipperary titles: 0
Inter-county
- Years: County
- 1950s: Tipperary
Inter-county titles
- Munster titles: 1 (1 as sub)
- All-Irelands: 1 (1 as sub)
- NHL: 1

Johnny McGrath (1931 – 5 June 2019) was an Irish retired sportsperson. He played hurling with his local club Nenagh Éire Óg and was a member of the Tipperary senior inter-county team in the late 1950s. McGrath won a set of All-Ireland and Munster titles with Tipperary as a non-playing substitute in 1958.
