= Willie O'Neill (Wexford hurler) =

Irish hurler

Personal information
- Native name: Liam Ó Néill (Irish)
- Born: 1945 (age 80–81) Kilmore, County Wexford, Ireland

Sport
- Sport: Hurling
- Position: Left corner-back
Club
- Years: Club
- Kilmore-Rathangan
Club titles
- Wexford titles: 0
Inter-county*
Years	County	Apps (scores)
1965-1967	Wexford	5 (0-00)
Inter-county titles
- Leinster titles: 1
- All-Irelands: 0
- NHL: 0
- *Inter County team apps and scores correct as of 13:17, 3 July 2015.

William O'Neill (born 1945) is an Irish retired hurler who played as left corner-back for the Wexford senior team.

Born in Kilmore, County Wexford, O'Neill first arrived on the inter-county scene at the age of twenty when he first linked up with the Limerick under-21 team. He made his senior debut during the 1965 championship. O'Neill immediately became a regular member of the team and won one Leinster medal. He was an All-Ireland runner-up on one occasion.

At club level O'Neill played with Kilmore-Rathangan.

Throughout his career O'Neill made 5 championship appearances. He retired from inter-county hurling following the conclusion of the 1967 championship.

== Playing career ==
=== Inter-county ===
O'Neill joined the Wexford under-21 team as captain in 1965. A 7-9 to 1-5 trouncing of Dublin gave him his first Leinster medal in that grade. Reigning champions Tipperary were the opponents in the subsequent All-Ireland final, however, a 3-7 to 1-4 victory gave O'Neill an All-Ireland medal.

Wexford retained their provincial crown in 1966, with O'Neill collecting a second Leinster medal following a 7-10 to 2-8 demolition of Laois. On 2 October 1966 Wexford faced Cork in the All-Ireland decider at Nowlan Park, however, a 3–12 to 5–6 draw was the result. The replay took place two weeks later, however, the sides couldn't be separated once again after a 4–9 apiece draw. At the third time of asking Cork finally triumphed following a huge 9–9 to 5–9 victory.

O'Neill made his senior championship debut on 11 July 1965 in a 1-15 to 2-6 Leinster semi-final defeat of Laois. He later won a Leinster medal following a 2-11 to 3-7 defeat of reigning provincial champions Kilkenny. Tipperary were Wexford's opponents in the subsequent All-Ireland final on 5 September 1965, however, the game failed to live up to the two classic games between the two sides in 1960 and 1962. Victory went to Tipperary on that occasion by 2–16 to 0–10, courtesy of a brace of goals by Seán McLoughlin.

After a defeat by Kilkenny in the Leinster decider in 1967, O'Neill retired from inter-county hurling.

== Honours ==
=== Team ===
Wexford

- Leinster Senior Hurling Championship (1): 1965
- All-Ireland Under-21 Hurling Championship (1): 1965 (c)
- Leinster Under-21 Hurling Championship (2): 1965 (c), 1966

Achievements
Preceded by Francis Loughnane (Tipperary)	All-Ireland Under-21 Hurling Final winning captain 1965	Succeeded by Gerald McCarthy (Cork)
