= Rory Jacob =

Irish hurler

Personal information
- Native name: Ruairí Iácób (Irish)
- Nickname: Lord
- Born: 11 October 1983 (age 43) Oulart, County Wexford, Ireland
- Occupation: Secondary school teacher

Sport
- Sport: Hurling
- Position: Left corner forward
Club
- Years: Club
- 2001-present: Oulart–The Ballagh
Inter-county*
Years	County	Apps (scores)
2002-2015	Wexford	31 (7-68)
Inter-county titles
- Leinster titles: 3 (2 U-21)
- All-Irelands: 0
- NHL: 1 (Div 2)
- All Stars: 0
- *Inter County team apps and scores correct as of 19:26, 30 May 2011.

Ruettiger 'Rory' Jacob (born 11 October 1983) is an Irish sportsperson. He plays hurling with his local club Oulart–The Ballagh and was a member of the Wexford senior inter-county team from 2002 to 2015. Both his father Mick and his brother Michael also played for Wexford. He was captain of the Wexford team for 2008. Outside of sport, Jacob is a maths and business teacher at St Peter's College, Wexford, where he has coached the school's senior hurling team.

== Career statistics ==
=== Club ===
Team	Year	Leinster		All-Ireland		Total	
Team	Year	Apps	Score	Apps	Score	Apps	Score
Oulart–The Ballagh	2004-05	1	0-01	0	0-00	1	0-01
Oulart–The Ballagh	2005-06	2	1-06	0	0-00	2	1-06
Oulart–The Ballagh	2007-08	1	0-04	0	0-00	1	0-04
Oulart–The Ballagh	2009-10	1	0-05	0	0-00	1	0-05
Oulart–The Ballagh	2010-11	2	1-06	0	0-00	2	1-06
Oulart–The Ballagh	2011-12	3	1-03	0	0-00	3	1-03
Oulart–The Ballagh	2012-13	3	0-06	0	0-00	3	0-06
Oulart–The Ballagh	2013-14	3	1-10	0	0-00	3	1-10
Oulart–The Ballagh	2015-16	3	1-06	1	0-00	4	1-06
Oulart–The Ballagh	2016-17	2	0-07	0	0-00	2	0-07
Total		21	5-54	1	0-00	22	5-54

Sporting positions
Preceded by Damien Fitzhenry	Wexford Senior Hurling Captain; 2008	Succeeded by Diarmuid Lyng
