= 1971–72 All-Ireland Senior Club Hurling Championship =

All-Ireland Senior Club Hurling Championship 1971–72
Championship Details
- Dates: 14 November 1971 – 14 May 1972

All Ireland Champions
- Winners: Blackrock (1st win)
- Captain: John Horgan

All Ireland Runners-up
- Runners-up: Rathnure

Provincial Champions
- Munster: Blackrock
- Leinster: Rathnure
- Ulster: Loughgiel Shamrocks
- Connacht: Tommy Larkin's

Championship Statistics
- Top Scorer: Dan Quigley (8–25)

The 1971–72 All-Ireland Senior Club Hurling Championship was the second staging of the All-Ireland Senior Club Hurling Championship, the Gaelic Athletic Association's premier inter-county club hurling tournament. The championship ran from 14 November 1971 to 14 May 1972.

Roscrea of Tipperary were the defending champions, however, they failed to qualify after being beaten by Moyne-Templetuohy in the 1971 Tipperary SHC final.

The All-Ireland final was played at Walsh Park in Waterford on 14 May 1972, between Blackrock of Cork and Rathnure of Wexford, in what was a first championship meeting between the teams. Blackrock won the match by 5–13 to 6–09 to claim a first title.

Rathnure's Dan Quigley was the championship's top scorer with 8–25.

== Connacht Senior Club Hurling Championship ==
=== Connacht first round ===
12 February 1972 First round	Craobh Rua	5–04 – 6–09	St Brigid's	Kilcoyne Park

=== Connacht semi-final ===
20 February 1972 Semi-final	St Brigid's	1–02 – 8–07	Four Roads	Seán O'Heslin Park
	F McKeon 1–0, H Smith 0–1, F Moran 0–1.		T Burley 3–0, J Moore 2–0, M Murphy 1–2, F Mitchell 1–2, P Rogerson 1–1, P Dolan 0–1, M Connell 0–1.

=== Connacht final ===
26 March 1972 Final	Four Roads	0–06 – 7–14	Tommy Larkin's	St Aidan's Park
	M Murphy 0–3, B Mitchell 0–2, F Mitchell 0–1.		T Donoghue 2–4, S Stanley 2–3, M Fogarty 1–3, P Madden 1–0, F Fahy 1–0, A Brehony 0–2, E Donoghue 0–2.

== Leinster Senior Club Hurling Championship ==
=== Leinster first round ===
12 December 1971 First round	Birr	0–06 – 2–07	Camross	St Brendan's Park
			M Cuddy 1–2, G Cuddy 1–0, S Cuddy 0–2, F Keenan 0–2, J Lyons 0–1.

12 December 1971 First round	St Fintan's	1–04 – 5–15	Bennettsbridge	Dr Cullen Park
				Referee: J Rankins (Laois)

=== Leinster quarter-finals ===
14 November 1971 Quarter-final	Craobh Chiaráin	3–03 – 2–11	Éire Óg	Croke Park
			P Dunny 0–7, N Behan 1–3, J Sharpe 1–0, P Sharpe 0–1.	Referee: J Hatton (Wicklow)

12 December 1971 Quarter-final	Arklow Rock Parnells	3–01 – 5–12	Rathnure	Aughrim County Ground
	F Reilly 1–0, J McDonald 1–0, J Byrne 1–0, A Byrne 0–1.		D Quigley 3–5, J English 2–1, M Quigley 0–3, J Higgins 0–2, J Mooney 0–1.

12 December 1971 Quarter-final	Boardsmill	1–10 – 2–08	St Brigid's	St Loman's Park
	S Garrigan 1–2, M Mooney 0–5, V Guy 0–2, S Carney 0–1.		C Gavin 2–2, O Egan 0–5, K Gavin 0–1.	Referee: D Doody (Dublin)

12 March 1972 Quarter-final	Bennettsbridge	1–09 – 1–01	Camross	Nowlan Park
	J Kinsella 1–4, P Moran 0–3, K Dunne 0–2.		P Dowling 1–0, O Cuddy 0–1.

=== Leinster semi-finals ===
12 March 1972 Semi-final	Rathnure	4–15 – 3–05	Éire Óg	Nowlan Park
	M Quigley 2–5, D Quigley 1–5, P Flynn 1–2, J Murphy 0–1, J Moore 0–1.		J Sharpe 2–0, T Healy 1–0, P Dunny 0–3, P Connolly 0–2.

26 March 1972 Semi-final	Bennettsbridge	4–08 – 1–10	St Brigid's	O'Moore Park
	J Kinsella 1–6, B O'Brien 2–0, W Kennedy 1–0, P Moran 0–1, J McGovern 0–1.		O Egan 0–10, P Bradley 1–0.

=== Leinster final ===
2 April 1972 Final	Rathnure	2–12 – 1–08	Bennettsbridge	Dr Cullen Park
	P Flynn 1–1, J English 1–0, D Quigley 0–3, T O'Connor 0–3, J Higgins 0–2, S Barron 0–1, J Murphy 0–1, M Byrne 0–1.		W Kennedy 1–4, P Moran 0–2, J Kinsella 0–2.

== Munster Senior Club Hurling Championship ==
=== Munster quarter-finals ===
23 January 1972 Quarter-final	Portlaw	1–04 – 3–09	Newmarket-on-Fergus	Portlaw Grounds
	D Power 1–0, M Hickey 0–3, J Whelan 0–1.		J Woods 1–1, J McNamara 1–1, M O'Leary 1–0, P McNamara 0–3, L Danaher 0–2, M Kilmartin 0–2.

23 January 1972 Quarter-final	Blackrock	2–18 – 2–11	Claughaun	Church Road
	P Moylan 1–9, D Collins 1–2, R Cummins 0–2, B Cummins 0–2, D Prendergast 0–1, M Murphy 0–1, P Kavanagh 0–1.		W Galligan 0–7, R Prendergast 1–2, D Sheehan 1–0, B Duggan 0–1, J Hehir 0–1.

=== Munster semi-finals ===
20 February 1972 Semi-final	Kilmoyley	2–04 – 3–11	Moyne-Templetuohy	Páirc Naomh Breandán
	P Regan 1–0, J Flanagan 1–0, D Lovett 0–3, JM Brick 0–1.			Referee: J Quaid (Limerick)

8 April 1972 Semi-final	Blackrock	5–14 – 2–05	Newmarket-on-Fergus	FitzGerald Park
	P Moylan 1–9, J Rothwell 1–2, D Prendergast 1–0, B Cummins 1–0, G Buckley 1–0, R Cummins 0–2, P Kavanagh 0–1.		P McNamara 1–0, P Daly 1–0, T Ryan 0–3, L Danaher 0–2.	Referee: S O'Grady (Limerick)

=== Munster final ===
25 April 1972 Final	Blackrock	4–10 – 3–01	Moyne-Templetuohy	FitzGerald Park
	P Moylan 1–5, M Murphy 1–1, B Cummins 1–0, J Rothwell 1–0, N O'Keeffe 0–1, D Collins 0–1, D Prendergast 0–1, A Creagh 0–1.		M Troy 2–0, A Egan 1–0, T Quinlan 0–1.	Referee: S O'Connor (Limerick)

== Ulster Senior Club Hurling Championship ==
=== Ulster final ===
16 April 1972 Final	Loughgiel Shamrocks	3–08 – 1–12	Portaferry	Mitchel Park

== All-Ireland Senior Club Hurling Championship ==
=== All-Ireland semi-finals ===
30 April 1972 Semi-final	Rathnure	5–25 – 2–04	Loughgiel Shamrocks	O'Kennedy Park
	D Quigley 2–8, M Quigley 1–5, J English 1–3, J Murphy 0–5, J Higgins 1–1, P Flynn 0–2, T O'Connor 0–1.		JJ Smith 1–2, B Mulholland 1–1, S McMullen 0–1.

30 April 1972 Semi-final	Tommy Larkin's	2–08 – 3–07	Blackrock	Duggan Park
	T Donohoe 1–1, C Farrell 0–4, M Fogarty 1–0, C Stanley 0–2, P Donohoe 0–1.		W Cronin 1–1, P Moylan 0–4, D Collins 1–0, R Cummins 1–0, J Rothwell 0–1, F Cummins 0–1.

=== All-Ireland final ===
14 May 1972 Final	Blackrock	5–13 – 6–09	Rathnure	Walsh Park
	J Rothwell 3–1, P Moylan 0–8, D Prendergast 2–0, D Collins 0–3, R Cummins 0–1.		D Quigley 2–4, S Barron 2–0, M Quigley 1–0, J English 1–0, T O'Connor 0–2, M Byrne 0–1, J Murphy 0–1, P Flynn 0–1.	Referee: N Dalton (Waterford)

== Championship statistics ==
=== Scoring ===
Overall

Rank	Player	Club	Tally	Total	Matches	Average
1	Dan Quigley	Rathnure	8–25	49	5	9.80
2	Pat Moylan	Blackrock	3–35	44	5	8.80
3	Martin Quigley	Rathnure	6–18	36	6	6.00

=== Miscellaneous ===
- Blackrock became the third team from Cork to win the Munster title.
