= Michael Jacob =

Irish hurler (born 1980)

Personal information
- Native name: Michéal Iácób (Irish)
- Nickname: Mick
- Born: 2 August 1980 (age 46) Oulart, County Wexford

Sport
- Sport: Hurling
- Position: Centre-forward
Club
- Years: Club
- Oulart–The Ballagh
Club titles
- Wexford titles: 5
Inter-county
Years	County	Apps (scores)
2001-2012	Wexford	? (4-29)
Inter-county titles
- Leinster titles: 1
- All-Irelands: 0

Michael Jacob (born 2 August 1980) is an Irish sportsperson. He plays in the centre-forward position on the Wexford senior hurling team.

== Early life ==
Michael Jacob was born in Oulart, County Wexford in 1980. He was born into a family that had a strong association with Gaelic games, as his father, Mick Jacob, won both Leinster and All-Ireland medals in hurling with Wexford. Jacob was educated locally and later attended Enniscorthy CBS. It was here that his skill at the game of hurling was developed and he won an All-Ireland "B" Colleges' medal with the school. Jacob later studied at the Waterford Institute of Technology, where he won two Fitzgibbon Cup medals.

== Playing career ==
=== Club ===
Jacob, along with his brother Rory, plays his club hurling with the famous Oulart–The Ballagh club in Wexford. He enjoyed some success at underage level before winning back-to-back senior county titles in 2004 and 2005. The club was beaten in their attempt to capture three-in-a-row in 2006.

=== Inter-county ===
Jacob joined the Wexford minor hurling panel in the late 1990s and he quickly moved up the ranks. He subsequently won a Leinster under-21 title in 2001 before making his senior debut that same year. Since then he has enjoyed some success at senior level and is perhaps best known for scoring a famous goal in Croke Park in 2004 as part of the Leinster Senior Hurling Championship. After blocking an attempted clearance from Peter Barry of Kilkenny, Jacob caught the ball and buried it into the net to give Wexford the win in the Leinster hurling semi-final. He subsequently collected his first Leinster medal.

Jacob has also represented Leinster in the Interprovincial Championship. In late 2012 he announced his retirement from Inter-county hurling.

In 2014 he joined the Wexford Intermediate team with whom he won a Leinster title after victory over Kilkennty in the final.

Preceded by John O'Connor	Wexford Senior Hurling Captain; 2005	Succeeded by Keith Rossiter
