= Jack Berry (hurler) =

Irish hurler (1944–2003)

Personal information
- Native name: Seán Ó Béara (Irish)
- Born: 1944 Rathangan, County Wexford, Ireland
- Died: 2 March 2003 (aged 58) Rathangan, County Wexford, Ireland
- Height: 5 ft 11 in (180 cm)

Sport
- Sport: Hurling and Football
- Position: Left corner-forward
Club
- Years: Club
- St Anne's Rathangan
Inter-county
Years	County	Apps (scores)
1968-1973	Wexford	16 (7-08)
Inter-county titles
- Leinster titles: 2
- All-Irelands: 1
- NHL: 1
- All Stars: 0

Jack Berry (1944 – 2 March 2003) was an Irish sportsperson. He played hurling with his local club St Anne's and was a member of the Wexford senior inter-county team from 1968 until 1973.

== Honours ==
St Anne's Rathangan

- Wexford Senior Football Championship: 1968
- Wexford Junior Football Championship: 1966
- Wexford Junior Football Championship: 1977

Wexford

- All-Ireland Senior Hurling Championship: 1968
- Leinster Senior Hurling Championship: 1968, 1970
- National Hurling League: 1972–73
- All-Ireland Under-21 Hurling Championship: 1965
- Leinster Under-21 Hurling Championship: 1965
