= 1972–73 National Hurling League =

42nd season of the National Hurling League

League details
- Dates: 8 October 1972 – 13 May 1973

League champions
- Winners: Wexford (4th win)

The 1972–73 National Hurling League was the 42nd season of the National Hurling League.

== Division 1 ==
National Hurling League Division 1
- Season: 1972-73
- Champions: Wexford; 4th National League title Captain: John Quigley
- Matches played: 63
- Top goalscorer: Francis Loughnane (5-55)
- Biggest home win: Laois 8-15 - 2-5 Westmeath (11 February 1973)
- Biggest away win: Galway 0-12 - 5-11 Cork (22 October 1972)
- Highest scoring: Kerry 6-10 - 4-10 Westmeath (17 September 1972)
- All statistics correct as of 11 March 2017.

Cork came into the season as defending champions of the 1971-72 season.

On 13 May 1973, Wexford won the title following a 4-13 to 3-7 win over Limerick in the final. It was their fourth league title overall and their first since 1966-67.

Tipperary's Francis Loughnane was the Division 1 top scorer with 5-55.

=== Division 1A table ===
Pos	Team	Pld	W	D	L	Diff	Pts	Notes
1	Kilkenny	7	6	0	1	+26	12	
2	Tipperary	7	4	2	1	+33	10	
3	Limerick	7	4	2	1	+32	10	Division 1 runners-up
4	Wexford	7	5	0	2	+23	10	Division 1 champions
5	Clare	7	3	2	2	+39	8	
6	Cork	7	2	0	5	-3	4	
7	Galway	7	1	0	6	-70	2	
8	Offaly	7	0	0	7	-30	0	Relegated to Division 1B

=== Group stage ===
8 October 1972	Limerick	3-8 - 4-5	Clare	Gaelic Grounds, Limerick
	R Bennis 2-4, W Moore 1-0, E Cregan 0-2, E Grimes 0-1, M Graham 0-1.		M Cummane 2-2, J McNamara 1-3, P McNamara 1-0.	Referee: F Murphy (Cork)

8 October 1972	Offaly	1-8 - 0-14	Galway	St. Brendan's Park, Birr
	M Moylan 1-0, B Moylan 0-2, PJ Whelehan 0-2, P Mulhare 0-1, M Cleere 0-1, W O'Gorman 0-1, P Horan 0-1.		P Fahy 0-9, A Fenton 0-3, T Cahalan 0-1, PJ Molloy 0-1.	Referee: J Moloney (Tipperary)

22 October 1972	Kilkenny	1-16 - 4-2	Limerick	Nowlan Park, Kilkenny
	K Purcell 1-2, L O'Brien 0-5, S Cooke 0-4, B Cody 0-2, M O'Dwyer 0-2, B Phelan 0-1.		W Moore 1-1, F Nolan 1-1, M Graham 1-0, E Grimes 1-0.	Referee: S O'Regan (Waterford)

22 October 1972	Galway	0-12 - 5-11	Cork	Ballinasloe Sportsfield, Ballinasloe
	P Fahy 0-3, A Fenton 0-2, S Kelly 0-2, P Hyland 0-1, T Murphy 0-1, G Glynn 0-1, F Burke 0-1, T Cahalane 0-1.		S O'Leary 2-3, M Malone 1-2, B O'Sullivan 1-0, F Cooper 1-0, J Russell 0-3, M Corbett 0-2, D Collins 0-1.	Referee: M Spain (Offaly)

22 October 1972	Clare	3-7 - 1-10	Offaly	Cusack Park, Ennis
	N Casey 2-1, M Moroney 1-0, J McNamara 0-2, J Cullinane 0-2, M Keane 0-1, M McKeogh 0-1.		B Moylan 0-6, M Moylan 1-0, PJ Whelehan 0-2, S Hanniffy 0-1, J McKenna 0-1.	Referee: S O'Grady (Limerick)

22 October 1972	Wexford	4-15 - 2-9	Tipperary	O'Kennedy Park, New Ross
	T Byrne 3-2, D Quigley 1-5, S Kinsella 0-4, J Quigley 0-2, J Murphy 0-1, T Doran 0-1.		P Byrne 2-0, J Flanagan 0-3, P O'Neill 0-2, S Power 0-1, L Gaynor 0-1, J Ryan 0-1, S Hogan 0-1.	Referee: N DAlton (Waterford)

5 November 1972	Tipperary	1-11 - 1-11	Clare	Seán Treacy Park, Tipperary
	P Byrne 1-1, F Loughnane 0-6, Dinny Ryan 0-1, S Hogan 0-1, J Flanagan 0-1, J Ryan 0-1.		M Moroney 1-1, J McNamara 0-4, J Cullinane 0-2, M Cummane 0-2, N Casey 0-1, M Keane 0-1.

5 November 1972	Cork	1-7 - 1-11	Kilkenny	Cork Athletic Grounds, Cork
	J Buckley 1-1, G McCarthy 0-3, T Sheehan 0-1, JK Coleman 0-1, C Roche 0-1.		E Keher 0-6, K Purcell 1-0, F Cummins 0-1, L O'Brien 0-1, S Cooke 0-1, P Delaney 0-1, M Garrett 0-1.	Referee: S O'Connor (Limerick)

5 November 1972	Limerick	2-18 - 1-1	Galway	Gaelic Grounds, Limerick
	A Dunworth 2-2, R Bennis 0-7, E Grimes 0-5, F Nolan 0-2, E Cregan 0-1, S Foley 0-1.		B O'Connor 1-0, P Fahy 0-1.	Referee: P Cronin (Cork)

5 November 1972	Offaly	2-9 - 2-11	Wexford	St. Brendan's Park, Birr
	B Moylan 1-2, J Conroy 1-0, PJ Whelehan 0-3, J McKenna 0-2, M Cleere 0-1, P Horan 0-1.		T Doran 2-3, D Quigley 0-4, S Kinsella 0-3, J Quigley 0-1.	Referee: S O'Grady (Limerick)

21 November 1972	Clare	3-4 - 1-9	Cork	Cusack Park, Ennis
	N Casey 1-1, M McKeogh 1-0, M McNamara 1-0, J Cullinan 0-3.		S O'Leary 1-2, G McCarthy 0-4, M Malone 0-1, J Russell 0-1, W Walsh 0-1.	Referee: S O'Connor (Limerick)

21 November 1972	Galway	2-6 - 3-12	Tipperary	Portumna
	P Fahy 1-2, A Fenton 1-0, S Silke 0-3, T Cahalan 0-1.		F Loughnane 2-5, N O'Dwyer 1-1, J Fogarty 0-2, P Byrne 0-1, D Ryan 0-1, J Ryan 0-1, T O'Connor 0-1.	Referee: S O'Grady (Limerick)

21 November 1972	Kilkenny	1-11 - 2-6	Offaly	Nowlan Park, Kilkenny
	E Keher 0-8, R Phelan 1-0, S Cooke 0-2, P Henderson 0-1.		P Mulhare 1-1, P Horan 1-0, J McKenna 0-2, B Moylan 0-1, PJ Whelehan 0-1, M Cleere 0-1.	Referee: J Dunphy (Waterford)

3 December 1972	Tipperary	2-7 - 1-4	Cork	Semple Stadium, Thurles
	F Loughnane 1-4, PJ Ryan 1-0, N O'Dwyer 0-1, J Ryan 0-1, J Fogarty 0-1.		W Walsh 1-1, G McCarthy 0-1, J Russell 0-1, F Norberg 0-1.	Referee: M Spain (Offaly)

3 December 1972	Wexford	3-6 - 3-16	Kilkenny	Wexford Park, Wexford
	S Kinsella 1-1, T Doran 1-1, T Byrne 1-0, D Bernie 0-2, M Quigley 0-1, J Quigley 0-1.		E Keher 2-5, R Phelan 1-1, S Cooke 0-4, P Henderson 0-3, L O'Brien 0-1, P Broderick 0-1.	Referee: J Hatton (Wicklow)

3 December 1972	Galway	0-7 - 4-4	Clare	Pearse Stadium, Salthill
	I Clarke 0-5, L Glynn 0-1, B O'Connor 0-1.		M McNamara 2-1, N Casey 1-0, M Cummane 1-0, M Moroney 0-2, J Cullinan 0-1.	Referee: S O'Grady (Limerick)

3 December 1972	Limerick	3-8 - 3-4	Offaly	Gaelic Grounds, Limerick
	R Bennis 2-2, E Grimes 1-2, A Dunworth 0-2, W Moore 0-1, E Cregan 0-1.		C Burke 2-0, B Moylan 1-2, PJ Conroy 0-2.	Referee: M Slattery (Clare)

4 February 1973	Tipperary	3-14 - 2-8	Kilkenny	Semple Stadium, Thurles
	F Loughnane 0-8, P Byrne 1-2, J Flanagan 1-1, M Keating 1-0, PJ Ryan 0-2, J Ryan 0-1.		K Purcell 2-3, L O'Brien 0-2, S Cooke 0-1, F Cummins 0-1, M Brennan 0-1.	Referee: N Dalton (Waterford)

4 February 1973	Cork	1-7 - 1-9	Wexford	Cork Athletic Grounds, Cork
	S O'Leary 1-2, G McCarthy 0-3, C McCarthy 0-2.		S Kinsella 0-6, J Berry 1-0, P Wilson 0-2, W Murphy 0-1.	Referee: S O'Grady (Limerick)

11 February 1973	Clare	2-3 - 1-9	Wexford	Cusack Park, Ennis
	P McNamara 1-0, N Casey 1-0, J Cullinane 0-1, J Callinan 0-1, M Moroney 0-1.		T Byrne 1-1, S Kinsella 0-3, J Purcell 0-2, D Bernie 0-1, J Berry 0-1, P Wilson 0-1.	Referee: S O'Grady (Limerick)

11 February 1973	Cork	3-8 - 1-10	Offaly	Cork Athletic Grounds, Cork
	D Collins 2-1, C Kelly 1-0, G McCarthy 0-2, C McCarthy 0-2, J Buckley 0-1, S O'Leary 0-1, P Doherty 0-1.		B Moylan 0-6, PJ Whelehan 1-0, P Mulhare 0-1, PJ Conroy 0-1, J McKenna 0-1, M Cleere 0-1.	Referee: J Moloney (Tipperary)

11 February 1973	Limerick	3-7 - 2-10	Tipperary	Gaelic Grounds, Limerick
	R Bennis 1-2, P Fogarty 1-0, M Dowling 1-0, E Cregan 0-3, L O'Donoghue 0-2.		R Ryan 2-1, F Loughnane 0-6, L Gaynor 0-2, PJ Ryan 0-1.	Referee: M Slattery (Clare)

11 February 1973	Kilkenny	1-14 - 1-12	Galway	Ballyragget
	K Purcell 0-7, M Brennan 1-2, P Delaney 0-3, L O'Brien 0-2.		P Fahy 0-7, G Holland 1-0, S Murphy 0-3, J McDonagh 0-1, D Fury 0-1.	Referee: N Dalton (Waterford)

4 March 1973	Cork	1-7 - 3-13	Limerick	Cork Athletic Grounds, Cork
	C McCarthy 1-5, M Malone 0-1, P Doherty 0-1.		R Bennis 1-5, M Graham 1-1, E Cregan 1-0, F Nolan 0-3, M Dowling 0-2, P Grimes 0-1, L O'Donoghue 0-1.	Referee: N Dalton (Waterford)

4 March 1973	Kilkenny	0-17 - 0-6	Clare	Nowlan Park, Kilkenny
	E Keher 0-8, L O'Brien 0-4, S Cooke 0-2, M Brennan 0-1, K Purcell 0-1, P Broderick 0-1.		J McNamara 0-3, N Casey 0-2, M Gilmartin 0-1.	Referee: J Moloney (Tipperary)

4 March 1973	Wexford	4-14 - 2-1	Galway	Páirc Uí Shíocháin, Gorey
	J Purcell 2-0, D Bernie 1-2, T Byrne 1-2, S Kinsella 0-5, T Doran 0-2, C Kehoe 0-1, M Jacob 0-1, P Wilson 0-1.		P Fahy 2-1.	Referee: J O'Regan (Waterford)

4 March 1973	Offaly	0-3 - 0-15	Tipperary	St. Brendan's Park, Birr
	M Cleere 0-1, P Mulhare 0-1, P Corcoran 0-1.		F Loughnane 0-3, L Gaynor 0-3, J Flanagan 0-2, J Ryan 0-2, D Ryan 0-2, S Hogan 0-2, R Ryan 0-1.	Referee: J O'Grady (Limerick)

11 March 1973	Wexford	2-12 - 4-11	Limerick	Enniscorthy
	T Byrne 2-3, S Kinsella 0-3, T Doran 0-2, D Bernie 0-1, M Jacob 0-1, J Berry 0-1, P Wilson 0-1.		R Bennis 1-5, E Grimes 1-2, M Dowling 1-0, F Nolan 1-0, P Hartigan 0-2, A Dunworth 0-1, P Fogarty 0-1.	Referee: J Dunphy (Waterford)

=== Division 1B table ===
Pos	Team	Pld	W	D	L	Diff	Pts	Notes
1	Waterford	7	6	1	0	+54	13	Promoted to Division 1A
2	Kildare	7	4	1	2	+21	9	
3	Dublin	7	4	1	2	+10	9	
4	Antrim	7	4	0	3	-2	8	
5	Laois	7	3	1	3	+43	7	
6	Westmeath	7	2	0	5	-41	4	
7	Wicklow	7	2	0	5	-33	4	
8	Kerry	7	1	0	6	-44	2	

=== Group stage ===
17 September 1972	Kerry	6-10 - 4-10	Westmeath	Austin Stack Park, Tralee
	F O'Sullivan 2-2, D Lovett 1-4, F Thornton 1-3, S Sheehy 1-1, J O'Sullivan 1-0.		O Egan 1-5, E Allen 1-0, V Bradley 1-0, G Murray 1-0, J Keary 0-2, O Boylan 0-1, P Curran 0-1, C Connaughton 0-1.

8 October 1972	Laois	3-5 - 2-9	Waterford	O'Moore Park, Portlaoise
	D Sheeran 1-1, F Keenan 1-0, M Mahon 1-0, G Lanham 0-2, P Kavanagh 0-1, J Dooley 0-1.		L Canning 1-5, M Kirwan 1-1, J Greene 0-3.	Referee: J O'Grady (Limerick)

8 October 1972	Kildare	5-15 - 2-11	Dublin	Sallins Road, Naas
	J Leary 2-1, J Walsh 0-7, F Deering 2-0, P Dunny 1-1, M Deeley 0-2, M Dwane 0-2, T Carey 0-2.		M Bermingham 1-2, Harry Walton 1-1, E Flynn 0-3, E Rheinisch 0-2, V Holden 0-2, PJ Holden 0-1.	Referee: J Kirwan (Offaly)

8 October 1972	Antrim	3-13 - 1-12	Wicklow	Fr. Healy Park, Loughguile
	B McGarry 2-3, A Hamill 0-5, A Thornbury 1-0, D McAuley 0-2, S Collins 0-1, M McKillop 0-1, W Richmond 0-1.		P Berkerry 1-3, A Byrne 0-3, C Keddy 0-2, M O'Brien 0-1, T Scott 0-1, K Power 0-1, M Kennedy 0-1.	Referee: E Devlin (Tyrone)

22 October 1972	Waterford	5-19 - 3-11	Kildare	The Sportsfield, Cappoquin
	S Greene 2-3, M Geary 1-5, M Hickey 1-3, M Kirwan 1-1, L Canning 0-3, J Galvin 0-2, J Kirwan 0-2.		J Walsh 1-7, B Burke 1-0, F Deering 1-0, M Dwan 0-2, P Dunny 0-2.	Referee: D O'Brien (Cork)

22 October 1972	Wicklow	2-9 - 1-11	Laois	Pearse Park, Arklow
	M Kennedy 1-1, K Power 1-0, T Byrne 0-3, P O'Reilly 0-2, P Berkery 0-1, A Byrne 0-1, T Morrissey 0-1.		F Keenan 0-5, J Phelan 1-0, G Lanham 0-2, M Mahon 0-2, P Kavanagh 0-1, D Sheerin 0-1.	Referee: D Shepherd (Carlow)

22 October 1972	Westmeath	2-15 - 4-7	Antrim	Cusack Park, Mullingar
	C Connaughton 1-7, M Fagan 1-1, J Keary 0-3, N Fitzsimons 0-1, F McManus 0-1, J Hynes 0-1, P Curran 0-1.		F Donnelly 1-2, A Hamill 1-1, S Richards 1-0, A McCallen 1-0, B McGarry 0-3, M Kellee 0-1.	Referee: D Robinson (Kildare)

5 November 1972	Kildare	0-14 - 4-2	Laois	St. Conleth's Park, Newbridge
	J Walsh 0-9, M Deeley 0-3, Bobby Bourke 0-1, J O'Leary 0-1.		P Dollard 2-0, M Mahon 1-1, G Lanham 1-0, T Dillon 0-1.

5 November 1972	Westmeath	2-12 - 2-6	Wicklow	Cusack Park, Mullingar
	J Leary 1-2, O Egan 1-0, F McManus 0-3, C Connaughton 0-3, J Hynes 0-1, P Curran 0-1, M Fagan 0-1, G Murray 0-1.		P Berkerry 1-1, T Scott 1-0, A Byrne 0-3, M Kennedy 0-2.	Referee: J Rankins (Laois)

5 November 1972	Antrim	2-8 - 2-7	Dublin	Waterfoot
	S McGourty 1-1, S Burns 0-4, S Richmond 1-0, S Collins 0-1, W Richmond 0-1, B McGarry 0-1.		D Rheinisch 1-2, J Towell 1-0, V Holden 0-2, F Murphy 0-2, J Kealy 0-1.	Referee: E Devlin (Tyrone)

5 November 1972	Kerry	1-5 - 2-11	Waterford	Castleisland
	B O'Connell 1-1, P Finnegan 0-1, T Nolan 0-1, N Power 0-1, F Thornton 0-1.		M Geary 1-2, P Kelly 1-0, J Kirwan 0-6, L Canning 0-1, M Kirwan 0-1, J Greene 0-1.

21 November 1972	Antrim	1-5 - 3-10	Waterford	Páirc Mac Uílín, Ballycastle
	S Richmond 1-0, S Collins 0-2, W Richmond 0-1, A Hamill 0-1, S Burns 0-1.		J Kirwan 1-3, S Greene 1-2, M Kirwan 1-1, A Heffernan 0-1, M Hickey 0-1, M Geary 0-1, J Galvin 0-1.	Referee: E Devlin (Tyrone)

21 November 1972	Dublin	2-8 - 2-4	Westmeath	Croke Park, Dublin
	M Bermingham 1-2, V Holden 1-1, E Flynn 0-2, J Kealy 0-1, J Towell 0-1, M Holden 0-1.		J Carey 1-0, C Connaughton 1-0, C Gavin 0-2, F McManus 0-2.	Referee: J Elheron (Wicklow)

21 November 1972	Laois	6-4 - 2-6	Kerry	O'Moore Park, Portlaoise
	G Lanham 2-0, F Keenan 1-2, M Mahon 1-1, P Dollard 1-0, D Thompson 1-0, P Dillon 0-1.		J Bunyan 1-3, M Fitzgerald 1-0, J O'Sullivan 0-2, F Thornton 0-1.	Referee: R Dowling (Kilkenny)

21 November 1972	Wicklow	3-1 - 4-2	Kildare	Aughrim County Ground, Aughrim
	F Byrne 1-0, K Mellon 1-0, P Berkerry 1-0, M Kennedy 0-1.		M Bohan 2-1, J Walsh 2-0, M Mullins 0-1.	Referee: M Bowe (Wexford)

3 December 1972	Antrim	3-3 - 5-6	Laois	Waterfoot
	A Hamill 1-2, M McKillop 1-0, S Burns 1-0, S McGourty 0-1.		G Conroy 2-1, G Lanham 1-1, P Dollard 1-0, D Thompson 1-0, P Dillon 0-3, E Moore 0-1.	Referee: F Devlin (Tyrone)

3 December 1972	Wicklow	4-5 - 4-8	Dublin	Aughrim County Ground, Aughrim
	P Keogh 3-1, A Byrne 1-2, M O'Brien 0-2.		D Rheinisch 3-0, H Dalton 1-0, J Kealy 0-3, F Murphy 0-2, M Bermingham 0-1, PJ Holden 0-1, M Allen 0-1.	Referee: D Robinson (Kildare)

3 December 1972	Kerry	2-5 - 3-6	Kildare	Austin Stack Park, Tralee
	F Thornton 2-1, J Bunyan 0-3, P Fitzgerald 0-1.		J Walsh 1-4, M Behan 1-0, M Moore 1-0, M Deeley 0-2.

3 December 1972	Westmeath	2-4 - 2-10	Waterford	Cusack Park, Mullingar
	F McManus 1-0, C Gavin 1-0, C Connaughton 0-2, G Murray 0-1, J Keary 0-1.		M Hickey 1-2, S Greene 1-1, M Kirwan 0-3, J Galvin 0-2, P Kelly 0-1, J Kirwan 0-1.

4 February 1973	Dublin	5-13 - 3-4	Kerry	Croke Park, Dublin
	D Rheinisch 4-1, D Walsh 1-1, P Quigley 0-4, M Bermingham 0-4, M Holden 0-1, PJ Holden 0-1, T Grealish 0-1.		J Bunyan 2-0, F Fitzgerald 1-0, P Moriarty 0-2, J Sullivan 0-1, B Healy 0-1.

11 February 1973	Waterford	2-8 - 1-11	Dublin	Walsh Park, Waterford
	M Kirwan 1-1, J Kirwan 1-1, S Greene 0-4, M Keary 0-1, A Heffernan 0-1.		P Quigley 0-6, M Bermingham 1-1, V Holden 0-1, H Dalton 0-1, M Holden 0-1.	Referee: P Cronin (Cork)

11 February 1973	Kildare	3-12 - 5-7	Antrim	Geraldine Park, Athy
	J Walsh 1-7, M Deeley 2-1, R Bourke 0-2, J O'Connell 0-1, M Moore 0-1.		E Donnelly 1-5, B McGarry 2-0, S Richmond 1-1, P McDonnell 1-0, N Wheeler 0-1.

11 February 1973	Kerry	1-6 - 2-4	Wicklow	Austin Stack Park, Tralee
	P Moriarty 0-4, C Nolan 1-0, J Bunyan 0-1, P Fitzgerald 0-1.		A Byrne 1-0, K Power 1-0, M O'Brien 0-2, P O'Reilly 0-1, P Berkerry 0-1.	Referee: J Quaid (Limerick)

11 February 1973	Laois	8-15 - 2-5	Westmeath	O'Moore Park, Portlaoise
	G Lanham 3-6, F Keane 2-1, P Dowling 1-1, P Kavanagh 1-1, P Dillon 0-4, G Cuddy 1-0, J Dooley 0-1, E Moore 0-1.		C Connaughton 1-2, K Galvin 1-0, O Boylan 0-1, F McManus 0-1, P Curran 0-1.	Referee: J Kirwan (Offaly)

4 March 1973	Wicklow	3-1 - 5-8	Waterford	Aughrim County Ground, Aughrim
	T Keenan 2-0, A Byrne 1-0, M Kennedy 0-1.		S Greene 2-2, J Kirwan 1-2, P Kelly 1-1, T Doyle 1-0, M Hickey 0-1, S Hannon 0-1, J Greene 0-1.	Referee: M Bowe (Wexford)

4 March 1973	Westmeath	0-4 - 1-16	Kildare	Cusack Park, Mullingar
	F McManus 0-3, J Hynes 0-1.		J Walsh 0-9, B Burke 1-0, M Dwane 0-2, J O'Leary 0-2, T Christian 0-1, T Carew 0-1, M Moore 0-1.	Referee: J Rankins (Laois)

4 March 1973	Dublin	2-12 - 3-7	Laois	Croke Park, Dublin
	M Holden 1-4, M Bermingham 1-1, P Quigley 0-4, PJ Holden 0-3.		G Conroy 2-0, L Corby 1-0, G Lanham 0-3, P Dillon 0-3, J Keenan 0-1.	Referee: D Robbins (Kildare)

4 March 1973	Antrim	4-10 - 1-8	Kerry	Croke Park, Dublin
	B McGarry 2-0, A Hamill 0-6, S Richmond 1-1, M McKillop 1-0, E Donnelly 0-3.		M O'Sullivan 1-0, P Henegan 0-3, T Nolan 0-2, P Costello 0-1, B Healy 0-1.	Referee: C Foley (Dublin)

=== Knock-out stage ===
Quarter-finals

8 April 1973 Quarter-final	Wexford	1-9 - 1-9	Waterford	Nowlan Park, Kilkenny
	T Byrne (0-5), S Kinsella (1-0), J Berry (0-3), P Wilson (0-1).		A Heffernan (0-7), S Greene (1-0), T Doyle (0-1), M Hickey (0-1).	Referee: F Murphy (Cork)

8 April 1973 Quarter-final	Kildare	2-9 - 5-18	Tipperary	St. Conleth's Park, Newbridge
	J Walsh (1-5), J O'Leary (1-1), M Geely (0-2), M Dwane (0-1).		R Ryan (4-0), F Loughnane (0-7), J Ryan (1-2), P Byrne (0-3), N O'Dwyer (0-3), J Flanagan (0-3).

15 April 1973 Quarter-final replay	Wexford	2-16 - 4-7	Waterford	Nowlan Park, Kilkenny
	T Byrne (0-9), T Doran (1-1), J Berry (1-0), W Murphy (0-2), J Quigley (0-1), C Kehoe (0-1), P Wilson (0-1), M Quigley (0-1).		S Greene (2-0), A Heffernan (0-5), T Doyle (1-0), M Hickey (1-0), M Whelan (0-1), S Hannon (0-1).	Referee: F Murphy (Cork)

Semi-finals

15 April 1973 Semi-final	Limerick	2-11 - 2-11	Tipperary	Nowlan Park, Kilkenny
	R Bennis (0-8), L O'Donoghue (2-1), F Nolan (0-1), É Cregan (0-1).		F Loughnane (0-8), J Flanagan (1-1), R Ryan (1-0), L Gaynor (0-2).	Attendance: 15,000; Referee: N Dalton (Waterford)

29 April 1973 Semi-final replay	Limerick	5-10 - 3-14 (aet)	Tipperary	St. Brendan's Park, Birr
	F Nolan (3-1), R Bennett (0-8), L Donoghue (1-0), É Cregan (1-0), W Moore (0-1).		F Loughnane (2-8), J Ryan (1-2), J Flanagan (0-2), D Ryan (0-1), R Ryan (0-1).	Referee: M Spain (Offaly)

29 April 1973 Semi-final	Wexford	2-10 - 2-9	Kilkenny	Walsh Park, Waterford
	T Byrne (1-5), T Doran (1-1), M Quigley (0-2), D Bernie (0-1), P Wilson (0-1).		E Keher (1-6), M Brennan (1-0), K Purcell (0-2), S Cooke (0-1).	Referee: N Dalton (Waterford)

Final

13 May 1973 Final	Wexford	4-13 - 3-7	Limerick	Croke Park, Dublin
	T Byrne 1-8, T Doran 2-0, M Quigley 1-1, N Buggy 0-2, C Keogh 0-1, H Goff 0-1.		R Bennis 1-4, M Dowling 1-1, E Cregan 1-0, E Grimes 0-2.	Attendance: 2-,814; Referee: F Murphy (Cork)

=== Scoring statistics ===
Top scorers overall

Rank	Player	Team	Tally	Total	Matches	Average
1	Francis Loughnane	Tipperary	5-55	70	9	7.77
2	Johnny Walsh	Kildare	6-48	66	8	8.25
3	Tom Byrne	Wexford	10-35	65	11	5.90
4	Richie Bennis	Limerick	8-37	61	8	7.62
5	Eddie Keher	Kilkenny	3-33	42	5	6.40
6	Stephen Greene	Waterford	9-12	39	9	4.33
7	George Lanham	Laois	7-14	35	7	5.00
8	Tony Doran	Wexford	7-11	32	11	2.90
8	Pádraic Fahy	Galway	3-23	32	7	4.57
10	Seán Kinsella	Wexford	2-25	31	9	3.44

Top scorers in a single game

Rank	Player	Team	Tally	Total	Opposition
1	George Lanham	Laois	3-06	15	Westmeath
2	Francis Loughnane	Tipperary	2-08	14	Limerick
3	Donal Rheinisch	Dublin	4-01	13	Kerry
4	Roger Ryan	Tipperary	4-00	12	Kildare
5	Tom Byrne	Wexford	3-02	11	Tipperary
5	Francis Loughnane	Tipperary	2-05	11	Galway
5	Eddie Keher	Kilkenny	2-05	11	Wexford
5	Tom Byrne	Wexford	1-08	11	Limerick
9	Peadar Keogh	Wicklow	3-01	10	Dublin
9	Frankie Nolan	Limerick	3-01	10	Tipperary
9	Richie Bennis	Limerick	2-04	10	Clare
9	Johnny Walsh	Kildare	1-07	10	Waterford
9	Colm Connaughton	Westmeath	1-07	10	Antrim
9	Johnny Walsh	Kildare	1-07	10	Antrim
