= Pádraic Fahy =

Irish hurler

Personal information
- Native name: Pádraic Ó Fathaigh (Irish)
- Born: Carnmore, County Galway
- Height: 5 ft 9 in (175 cm)

Sport
- Position: Left corner-forward
Club
- Years: Club
- 1960s-1980s: Carnmore
Club titles
- Galway titles: 0
Inter-county
- Years: County
- 1960s-1970s: Galway
Inter-county titles
- All-Irelands: 0
- All Stars: 0
	Football	Hurling
League titles		1

Pádraic Fahy (born 1948 in Carnmore, County Galway) is an Irish former sportsperson. He played hurling with his local club Carnmore and was a member of the Galway senior inter-county team in the 1960s and 1970s.
