= 1964 All-Ireland Under-21 Hurling Championship =

All-Ireland Under-21 Hurling Championship 1964
Championship Details
- Dates: 29 March 1964 – 4 October 1964
- Teams: 18

All Ireland Champions
- Winners: Tipperary (1st win)
- Captain: Francis Loughnane

All Ireland Runners-up
- Runners-up: Wexford
- Captain: Jim Berry

Provincial Champions
- Munster: Tipperary
- Leinster: Wexford
- Ulster: Antrim
- Connacht: Roscommon

Championship Statistics
- Matches Played: 17
- Total Goals: 154 (9.0 per game)
- Total Points: 187 (11.0 per game)
- Top Scorer: Michael Keating (11-14)

The 1964 All-Ireland Under-21 Hurling Championship was the inaugural staging of the All-Ireland Under-21 Hurling Championship. The championship began on 29 March 1964 and ended on 4 October 1964.

Tipperary won the title after defeating Wexford 8-9 to 3-1 in the final.

== Teams ==
A total of eighteen teams entered the inaugural under-21 championship, however, there was a lop-sides nature to the competition due to the provincial structure. Galway, who had played in the Munster province at senior and minor levels since 1959, joined the other six traditional Munster teams and competed in the southern championship. Nine of the Leinster counties, including Louth, more notable as a Gaelic football stronghold, contested the eastern province. Antrim were the sole representatives from Ulster while Roscommon faced no competition as Connacht representatives.

=== Team summaries ===
Connacht	Leinster	Munster	Ulster
Roscommon	Carlow; Dublin; Kildare; Kilkenny; Laois; Louth; Offaly; Westmeath; Wexford	Clare; Cork; Galway; Kerry; Limerick; Tipperary; Waterford	Antrim

== Results ==
=== Leinster Under-21 Hurling Championship ===
First round

29 March 1964 First round	Louth	0-04 - 3-12	Westmeath	Páirc Tailteann, Navan
	J Carroll 0-2, P Grant 0-1, D Feeney 0-1.		P Loughlin 1-5, C Connaughton 1-2, D Dowd 1-1, S Henry 0-3, P Casey 0-1.

5 April 1964 First round	Carlow	1-04 - 6-10	Kilkenny	Dr. Cullen Park, Carlow
	L Cullen 1-0, C Hayde 0-2, T Whelan 0-1, T Coburn 0-1.		J Delaney 2-2, M Aylward 2-2, B Watson 1-0, T Barry 1-0, T Ryan 0-2, J Cleere 0-2, S Muldowney 0-2.

Second round

12 April 1964 Second round	Laois	4-02 - 1-03	Kildare	O'Moore Park, Portlaoise
	J Bergin 2-0, O Cuddy 1-1, P Delaney 1-1.		M Mullen 1-0, J Wall 0-2, J Coffey 0-1.

19 April 1964 Second round	Wexford	4-03 - 3-05	Kilkenny	O'Kennedy Park, New Ross
	C Dowdall 2-2, T Maher 1-1, T Dunne 1-0.		T Ryan 2-0, L O'Neill 1-1, T Walsh 0-3, J Byrne 0-1.

26 April 1964 Second round	Westmeath	3-09 - 5-04	Dublin	Cusack Park, Mullingar
	P Fagan 1-4, P Loughlin 1-2, L Jackson 1-0, J Henry 0-1, C Connaughton 0-1, P Gaskin 0-1.		T Cunningham 2-0, R Copeland 1-1, L Lawlor 1-0, T Kiely 1-0, W Byrne 0-2, E Flynn 0-1.

Semi-finals

7 June 1964 Semi-final	Laois	10-07 - 5-02	Offaly	O'Moore Park, Portlaoise
	N Peacock 4-0, T O'Gorman 3-0, J Bergin 2-0, L Ryan 1-3, L Kavanagh 0-3, P Bergin 0-1.		J Dooley 3-0, B Moylan 2-2.

14 June 1964 Semi-final	Wexford	8-13 - 3-06	Dublin	Enniscorthy
	T Doran 6-0, T Maher 1-4, W Carney 1-2, O Cullen 0-2, A Quirke 0-2, C Dowdall 0-2, M Kinsella 0-1.		E Flynn 1-1, P O'Brien 1-1, T Woods 1-0, D Kinsella 0-1, T Kiely 0-1, D Rheinisch 0-1, R Copelan 0-1.

Final

28 June 1964 Final	Wexford	4-07 - 2-02	Laois	Enniscorthy
	C Dowdall 0-6, P Quigley 1-0, W Bernie 1-0, O Cullen 1-0, T Maher 1-0, A Quirke 0-1.		P Dillon 1-2, B Dowdall 1-0.

=== Munster Under-21 Hurling Championship ===
Quarter-finals

31 May 1964 Quarter-final	Kerry	4-06 - 4-07	Galway	Gaelic Grounds, Limerick
	Tom Lyons 2-1, B O'Brien 1-1, F Thornton 1-1, D Lucid 0-4.		J Maher 1-2, T Bohan 1-2, F Meaney 1-2, E Corless 1-0, M O'Connor 0-1.	Referee: M Hayes (Clare)

31 May 1964 Quarter-final	Limerick	7-04 - 9-07	Clare	Gaelic Grounds, Limerick
	T Boyce 3-0, B Hartigan 3-0, G Cosgrove 1-0, É Cregan 0-3, F Costelloe 0-1.		P McNamara 5-1, J Nevin 1-1, V Loftus 1-0, M O'Leary 1-0, E Moylan 1-0, G Stack 0-2, PJ Purcell 0-2, V Hogan 0-1.	Referee: A Higgins (Galway)

21 June 1964 Quarter-final	Tipperary	6-09 - 1-01	Cork	Seán Treacy Park, Tipperary
	M Keating 2-2, J Ryan 2-0, TJ Butler 2-0, N Roche 0-3, N Lane 0-2, F Loughnane 0-1, R Buckley 0-1.		M Archer 1-0, S Murphy 0-1.

Semi-finals

5 July 1964 Semi-final	Waterford	8-13 - 3-05	Galway	Gaelic Grounds, Limerick
	S Greene 4-1, V Connors 1-4, M Fahy 1-2, J O'Brien 1-2, D Duggan 1-0, M Regan 0-2, J Whelan 0-1, M Power 0-1.		G Gardiner 2-0, T Kelly 1-1, P Gilmore 0-2, T Duffy 0-1, F Coffey 0-1.	Referee: G Lowry (Limerick)

9 July 1964 Semi-final	Tipperary	7-06 - 2-04	Clare	Gaelic Grounds, Limerick
	M Keating 2-5, J Butler 2-0, T Brennan 1-1, R Buckley 1-0, F Loughnane 1-0.		P McNamara 2-0, L Danagher 0-3, J Woods 0-1.

Final

30 July 1964 Final	Tipperary	8-09 - 3-01	Waterford	Walsh Park, Waterford
	M Keating 3-3, J Ryan 2-2, S Loughnane 1-4, R Buckley 2-0.		J O'Brien 1-0, M Foley 1-0, S Greene 1-0, M Regan 0-1.	Referee: WJ Daly (Cork)

=== All-Ireland Under-21 Hurling Championship ===
Semi-finals

2 August 1964 Semi-final	Antrim	3-03 - 5-08	Wexford	Casement Park, Belfast
	E Trainor 1-0, H Donaghy 1-0, S McMullan 0-2, A Black 0-1.		S Barron 2-0, J Lacey 2-0, C Jacob 1-2, C Dowdall 0-4, P Quigley 0-1, B Bernie 0-1.

16 August 1964 Semi-final	Roscommon	2-04 - 11-6	Tipperary	St. Coman's Park, Roscommon
	M Murphy 1-0, J Dolan 1-0, P Harrington 0-2, J Moore 0-1, J Craughwell 0-1.		M Keating 2-2, N Lane 2-1, M Burckley 2-1, TJ Butler 2-0, T Brennan 2-0, J Ryan 1-1, F Loughnane 0-1.

Final

4 October 1964 Final	Tipperary	8-09 - 3-01	Wexford	Nowlan Park, Kilkenny
	M Keating 2-2, J Fogarty 2-0, M Lane 1-1, J Dillon 1-1, TK Butler 1-1, M Roche 1-0, F Loughnane 0-3, T Brennan 0-1.		C Dowdall 2-1, C Jacob 1-0.	Referee: A Higgins (Galway)

== Championship statistics ==
=== Top scorers ===
Top scorers overall

Rank	Player	Team	Tally	Total
1	Michael Keating	Tipperary	11-14	47
2	Con Dowdall	Wexford	4-15	27
3	Paddy McNamara	Clare	7-01	22
3	T. J. Butler	Tipperary	7-01	22
4	Tony Doran	Wexford	6-00	18
4	P. J. Ryan	Tipperary	5-03	18
5	Stephen Greene	Waterford	5-01	16
6	Tony Maher	Wexford	3-05	14
7	Noel Lane	Tipperary	4-05	13
7	P. Loughlin	Westmeath	2-07	13

Top scorers in a single game

Rank	Player	Club	Tally	Total	Opposition
1	Tony Doran	Wexford	6-00	18	Dublin
2	Paddy McNamara	Clare	5-01	16	Limerick
3	Stephen Greene	Waterford	4-01	13	Galway
4	Noel Peacock	Laois	4-00	12	Offaly
4	Michael Keating	Tipperary	3-03	12	Waterford
5	Michael Keating	Tipperary	2-05	11	Clare
6	T. O'Gorman	Laois	3-00	9	Offaly
6	J. Dooley	Offaly	3-00	9	Laois
6	Tony Boyce	Limerick	3-00	9	Clare
6	Bernie Hartigan	Limerick	3-00	9	Clare

=== Miscellaneous ===
- Antrim and Roscommon were the sole representatives of Ulster and Connacht respectively due to a lack of competition.
- Tipperary become the first team to claim the senior and under-21 double. Earlier in the year the Tipperary senior team defeated Kilkenny to claim the Liam MacCarthy Cup.
