= Paul Lynch (hurler) =

Irish hurler (1938–2014)

Personal information
- Native name: Pól Ó Loingsigh (Irish)
- Born: June 1938 Enniscorthy, County Wexford, Ireland
- Died: 19 January 2014 (aged 75) Enniscorthy, County Wexford, Ireland
- Height: 5 ft 10 in (178 cm)

Sport
- Sport: Hurling
- Position: Right wing-forward
Clubs
- Years: Club
- Enniscorthy Shamrocks; St Aidan's; Rapparees Starlights
Club titles
- Wexford titles: 1
Inter-county
Years	County	Apps (scores)
1961–1969	Wexford	10 (5-31)
Inter-county titles
- Leinster titles: 3
- All-Irelands: 1
- NHL: 1

Paul Lynch (June 1938 – 19 January 2014) was an Irish hurler. At club level, he played with Enniscorthy Shamrocks, St Aidan's and Rapparees Starlights, and at inter-county level with the Wexford senior hurling team.

== Career ==
Educated at Enniscorthy CBS, Lynch played hurling and Gaelic football with a range of clubs. He began his career in 1956 with Rapparees Starlights before later claiming a Wexford JHC medal with Enniscorthy Shamrocks in 1959. A Wexford IHC medal followed a year later before Lynch added a Wexford SHC medal to his collection after a defeat of Ferns St Aidan's in 1969.

At inter-county level, Lynch first played for Wexford as part of the junior team that won the Leinster JHC title in 1959. He later won an All-Ireland IHC medal in 1961 after Wexford's 3-15 to 4-04 win over London in the final.

Lynch joined the senior team in 1961 and won his first Leinster SHC medal the following year before lining out in the defeat by Tipperary in the 1962 All-Ireland final. Lynch won a second Leinster SHC medal in 1965 before adding a National Hurling League medal to his collection in 1967. He claimed a third Leinster SHC medal in 1968, before later winning an All-Ireland SHC medal after lining out at wing-forward in the 5-08 to 3-12 victory over Tipperary.

== Death ==
Lynch died on 19 January 2014, at the age of 75.

== Honours ==
Enniscorthy Shamrocks

- Wexford Senior Hurling Championship: 1969
- Wexford Intermediate Hurling Championship: 1960
- Wexford Junior Hurling Championship: 1959

Wexford

- All-Ireland Senior Hurling Championship: 1968
- Leinster Senior Hurling Championship: 1962, 1965, 1968
- National Hurling League: 1966–67
- All-Ireland Intermediate Hurling Championship: 1961
- Leinster Intermediate Hurling Championship: 1961
- Leinster Junior Hurling Championship: 1959
