= 1963 All-Ireland Minor Hurling Championship =

33rd staging of the All-Ireland Minor Hurling Championship

All-Ireland Minor Hurling Championship 1963
Championship Details
- Dates: 14 April 1963 - 1 September 1963
- Teams: 24

All Ireland Champions
- Winners: Wexford (1st win)
- Captain: Willie Bernie

All Ireland Runners-up
- Runners-up: Limerick
- Captain: Éamonn Cregan

Provincial Champions
- Munster: Limerick
- Leinster: Wexford
- Ulster: Antrim
- Connacht: Roscommon

Championship Statistics
- Matches Played: 26

The 1963 All-Ireland Minor Hurling Championship was the 33rd staging of the All-Ireland Minor Hurling Championship since its establishment by the Gaelic Athletic Association in 1928.

Kilkenny entered the championship as the defending champions in search of a fourth successive title, however, they were beaten by Wexford in the Leinster final.

On 1 September 1963 Wexford won the championship following a 6-12 to 5-9 defeat of Limerick in the All-Ireland final. This was their first All-Ireland title.

== Results ==
=== Connacht Minor Hurling Championship ===
Semi-final

14 July 1963 Semi-final	Roscommon	4-11 - 1-7	Leitrim	MacHale Park, Castlebar

Final

8 August 1963 Final	Roscommon	1-7 - 3-0	Mayo	Dr. Hyde Park, Roscommon

=== Leinster Minor Hurling Championship ===
First round

14 April 1963 First round	Westmeath	6-10 - 0-0	Meath	Cusack Park, Mullingar

14 April 1963 First round	Kildare	7-7 - 3-0	Wicklow	Geraldine Park, Athy

Second round

28 April 1963 Second round	Carlow	3-1 - 1-2	Offaly	O'Moore Park, Portlaoise

12 May 1963 Second round	Westmeath	3-9 - 2-3	Kildare	O'Moore Park, Portlaoise

Quarter-finals

23 June 1963 Quarter-final	Laois	5-6 - 4-6	Westmeath	O'Connor Park, Tullamore

30 June 1963 Quarter-final	Dublin	1-8 - 2-5	Carlow	Nowlan Park, Kilkenny

7 July 1963 Quarter-final replay	Dublin	5-9 - 1-1	Carlow	Croke Park, Dublin

Semi-finals

7 July 1963 Semi-final	Wexford	7-9 - 3-4	Laois	Croke Park, Dublin

21 July 1963 Semi-final	Kilkenny	1-10 - 0-9	Dublin	Croke Park, Dublin

Final

28 July 1963 Final	Wexford	6-10 - 6-8	Kilkenny	Croke Park, Dublin

=== Munster Minor Hurling Championship ===
Quarter-finals

12 May 1963 Quarter-final	Waterford	9-6 - 0-4	Kerry	Castle Grounds, Lismore

12 May 1963 Quarter-final	Limerick	2-11 - 4-4	Galway	Gaelic Grounds, Limerick

12 May 1963 Quarter-final	Cork	2-7 - 3-3	Clare	Gaelic Grounds, Limerick

Semi-finals

30 June 1963 Semi-final	Tipperary	6-6 - 3-9	Cork	Gaelic Grounds, Limerick

7 July 1963 Semi-final	Limerick	2-6 - 1-9	Waterford	Athletic Grounds, Cork

7 July 1963 Semi-final replay	Limerick	2-9 - 2-5	Waterford	MacDonagh Park, Nenagh

Final

28 July 1963 Final	Limerick	4-12 - 5-4	Tipperary	Gaelic Grounds, Limerick

=== Ulster Minor Hurling Championship ===
Semi-finals

30 June 1963 Semi-final	Donegal	2-9 - 1-4	Tyrone	Fr. Tierney Park, Ballyshannon

14 July 1963 Semi-final	Antrim	3-7 - 4-4	Down	Casement Park, Belfast

21 July 1963 Semi-final replay	Down	4-7 - 2-4	Antrim	St. Patrick's Park, Portaferry

Final

4 August 1963 Final	Antrim	4-12 - 5-4	Donegal	The Playing Fields, Lurgan

=== All-Ireland Minor Hurling Championship ===
Semi-finals

11 August 1963 Semi-final	Antrim	3-1 - 8-14	Wexford	Casement Park, Belfast

20 August 1963 Semi-final	Limerick	15-13 - 1-1	Roscommon	Gaelic Grounds, Limerick

Final

1 September 1963 Final	Wexford	6-12 - 5-9	Limerick	Croke Park, Dublin
	C Dowdall 0-8, T Doran 2-1, W Benrie 2-0, V Staples 1-1, S Barron 1-0, F Swords 0-1, W Carley 0-1.		B Cobbe 2-0, A Roche 0-6, C Danaher 1-0, S Geary 1-0, G Cosgrave 1-0, B Savage 0-2, É Cregan 0-1.

== Statistics ==
=== Miscellaneous ===
- The All-Ireland semi-final between Limerick and Roscommon was the first ever championship meeting between the two teams. It remains their only meeting in this grade. The 54-point winning margin for Limerick is a record for an All-Ireland semi-final.
