= 1968 All-Ireland Senior Hurling Championship =

Championship details
- Dates: 5 May – 1 September 1968
- Teams: 12

All-Ireland champions
- Winning team: Wexford (5th win)
- Captain: Dan Quigley

All-Ireland Finalists
- Losing team: Tipperary
- Captain: Mick Roche

Provincial champions
- Munster: Tipperary
- Leinster: Wexford
- Ulster: Not Played
- Connacht: Not Played

Championship statistics
- No. matches played: 11
- Top Scorer: Tony Doran (6–3)
- Player of the Year: Dan Quigley
- All-Star Team: See here

The All-Ireland Senior Hurling Championship of 1968 was the 82nd staging of Ireland's premier hurling knock-out competition. Wexford won the championship, beating Tipperary 5–8 to 3–12 in the final at Croke Park, Dublin.

== The championship ==
=== Participating counties ===
Province	County	Most recent success	
Province	County	All-Ireland	Provincial
Leinster	Dublin	1938	1961
	Kilkenny	1967	1967
	Laois	1915	1949
	Offaly		
	Westmeath		
	Wexford	1960	1965
Munster	Clare	1914	1932
	Cork	1966	1966
	Galway	1923	1922
	Limerick	1940	1955
	Tipperary	1965	1967
	Waterford	1959	1963

=== Format ===
==== Leinster Championship ====
First round: (1 match) This is a single match between two of the weaker teams drawn from the province of Leinster. One team is eliminated at this stage, while the winners advance to the quarter-final.

Second round: (1 match) This is a single match between the winner of the first round and another team drawn from the province of Leinster. One team is eliminated at this stage, while the winners advance to the semi-finals.

Semi-finals: (2 matches) The winners of the quarter-final join three other Leinster teams to make up the semi-final pairings. Two teams are eliminated at this stage, while two teams advance to the Leinster final.

Final: (1 match) The winners of the two semi-finals contest this game. One team is eliminated at this stage, while the winners advance to the All-Ireland final.

==== Munster Championship ====
First round: (2 matches) These are two lone matches between the first four teams drawn from the province of Munster. Two teams are eliminated at this stage, while two teams advance to the semi-finals.

Semi-finals: (2 matches) The winners of the two quarter-finals join the other two Munster teams to make up the semi-final pairings. Two teams are eliminated at this stage, while two teams advance to the final.

Final: (1 match) The winners of the two semi-finals contest this game. One team is eliminated at this stage, while the winners advance to the All-Ireland final.

==== All-Ireland Championship ====
Final: (1 match) The Leinster and the Munster champions contest the All-Ireland final.

== Fixtures ==
=== Leinster Senior Hurling Championship ===
May 5, 1968
First Round

Westmeath	3–7 – 1–10	Laois
W. Weldon (2–0), M. Flanagan (1–1), T. Ring (0–3), L. Jackson (0–2), J. Rooney (0–1).		C. O'Brien (1–3), S. Bergin (0–4), B. Delaney (0–2), E. Moore (0–1).

O'Connor Park, Tullamore
Referee: P. Johnston (Kilkenny)

May 19, 1968
Second Round

Westmeath	3–8 – 3–15	Offaly
T. Ring (2–3), J. Rooney (1–1), J. Keary (0–2), S. Kirby (0–1), C. Connaughton (0–1).		P. Molloy (0–8), B. Barry (2–1), J. Flaherty (0–4), J. Kirwan (1–0), J. Purke (0–1), P. J. Whelehan (0–1).

Cusack Park, Mullingar
Referee: P. Johnston (Kilkenny)

June 16, 1968
Semi-Final

Wexford	3–15 – 1–11	Dublin
T. Doran (2–2), C. Jacob (1–2), P. Lynch (0–5), J. O'Brien (0–4), C. Dowdall (0–1), N. Buggy (0–1).		D. Foley (0–4), N. Kinsella (1–0), A. Boothman (0–3), E. Flynn (0–2), P. Maycock (0–1), L. Foley (0–1).

Nowlan Park, Kilkenny
Referee: S. Murphy (Kilkenny)

June 23, 1968
Semi-Final

Kilkenny	3–13 – 4–6	Offaly
E. Keher (1–4), P. Freyne (1–3), J. Dwyer (1–1), F. Cummins (0–2), C. Dunne (0–1), R. Blanchfield (0–1), P. Moran (0–1).		P. Whelan (2–0), B. Barry (1–1), J. Flaherty (1–0), P. Molloy (0–3), J. J. Healion (0–1), G. Burke (0–1).

O'Moore Park, Portlaoise
Referee: D. Ferguson (Meath)

July 14, 1968
Final

Wexford	3–13 – 4–9	Kilkenny
T. Doran (2–0), J. Berry (1–0), P. Lynch (0–4), J. O'Brien (0–3), C. Jacob (0–2), D. Quigley (0–1), P. Wilson (0–1), D. Bernie (0–1), J. Quigley (0–1).		J. Teehan (2–1), E. Keher (0–6), C. Dunne (1–1), S. Cleere (1–0), J. Dwyer (0–1).

Croke Park, Dublin
Attendance: 25,000
Referee: J. Dowling (Offaly)

=== Munster Senior Hurling Championship ===
May 19, 1968
First Round

Clare	1–12 – 2–8	Waterford
L. Griffin (1–2), T. Ryan (0–4), N. Pyne (0–2), P. Cronin (0–2), L. Danaher (0–1), A. Lohan (0–1).		L. Guinan (1–0), F. Walsh (0–5), M. Óg Morrissey (1–1), J. Meaney (0–1), T. Cheasty (0–1).

Thurles Sportsfield, Thurles
Referee: P. Cronin (Cork)

May 26, 1968
First Round

Cork	3–11 – 2–9	Limerick
J. McCarthy (1–2), C. Sheehan (1–2), C. McCarthy (0–4), T. Connolly (1–0), G. McCarthy (0–2), C. Roche (0–1).		B. Hartigan (0–5), M. Cregan (1–1), P. Murphy (1–0), E. Cregan (0–3).

Thurles Sportsfield, Thurles
Referee: M. Slattery (Clare)

June 23, 1968
Semi-Final

Cork	3–15 – 1–6	Galway
C. McCarthy (1–3), J. Bennett (1–3), G. McCarthy (0–5), A. O'Flynn (1–0), D. Coughlan (0–2), S. Barry (0–2).		M. O'Connor (1–1), S. Stanley (0–2), P. Mitchell (0–2), J. Connolly (0–1).

Ennis Road, Limerick
Referee: M. Slattery (Clare)

June 30, 1968
Semi-Final

Tipperary	5–11 – 5–6	Clare
J. Doyle (0–7), J. Ryan (1–2), M. Ketaing (1–1), J. Flanagan (1–1), D. Nealon (1–0), J. McKenna (1–0).		T. Ryan (2–0), P. McNamara (1–2), N. Jordan (1–1), M. Arthur (1–0), P. CRonin (0–3).

Cork Athletic Grounds, Cork
Referee: P. Cronin (Cork)

July 21, 1968
Final

Tipperary	2–13 – 1–7	Cork
M. Keating (1–3), J. Doyle (0–5), L. Devaney (1–1), P. J. Ryan (0–2), J. Ryan (0–1), M. Burns (0–1).		C. McCarthy (0–4), T. Ryan (1–0), J. Bennett (0–1), G. McCarthy (0–1), J. O'Sullivan (0–1).

Gaelic Grounds, Limerick
Attendance: 43,238
Referee: M. Slattery (Clare)

=== All-Ireland Senior Hurling Championship ===
September 1, 1968
Final

Wexford	5–8 – 3–12	Tipperary
J. Berry (2–2), T. Doran (2–1), P. Lynch (1–3), J. O'Brien (0–2).		J. Doyle (1–5), M. Keating (1–3), S. McLoughlin (1–1), L. Devaney (0–2), M. Burns (0–1).

Croke Park, Dublin
Attendance: 63,461
Referee: J. Dowling (Offaly)

Wexford	Tipperary

== Top scorers ==
=== Season ===
Rank	Player	County	Tally	Total	Matches	Average
1	Tony Doran	Wexford	6-03	21	3	7.00
2	Jimmy Doyle	Tipperary	1–17	20	3	6.66
3	Michael Keating	Tipperary	3-07	16	3	5.33
4	Paul Lynch	Wexford	1–12	15	3	5.00
5	Charlie McCarthy	Cork	1–11	14	3	4.66
6	Eddie Keher	Kilkenny	1–10	13	2	6.50
7	Tommy Ring	Westmeath	2-06	12	2	6.00
8	Jack Berry	Wexford	3-02	11	3	3.66
8	Paddy Molloy	Offaly	0–11	11	2	5.50
10	Tom Ryan	Clare	2-04	10	2	5.00

=== Single game ===
Rank	Player	County	Tally	Total	Opposition
1	Tommy Ring	Westmeath	2-03	9	Offaly
2	Tony Doran	Wexford	2-02	8	Dublin
2	Jack Berry	Wexford	2-02	8	Tipperary
2	Jimmy Doyle	Tipperary	1-05	8	Wexford
2	Paddy Molloy	Offaly	0-08	8	Westmeath
6	Eddie Keher	Kilkenny	1-04	7	Offaly
6	Jimmy Doyle	Tipperary	0-07	7	Clare
8	Willie Weldon	Westmeath	2-00	6	Laois
8	Pad Joe Whelehan	Offaly	2-00	6	Kilkenny
8	Tony Doran	Wexford	2-00	6	Kilkenny
8	Tom Ryan	Clare	2-00	6	Tipperary
8	Michael Keating	Tipperary	1-03	6	Cork
8	Paul Lynch	Wexford	1-03	6	Tipperary
8	Michael Keating	Tipperary	1-03	6	Wexford
8	Christy O'Brien	Laois	1-03	6	Westmeath
8	P. Freyne	Kilkenny	1-03	6	Offaly
8	Charlie McCarthy	Cork	1-03	6	Galway
8	John Bennett	Cork	1-03	6	Galway
