= 1965 All-Ireland Under-21 Hurling Championship =

All-Ireland Under-21 Hurling Championship 1965
Championship Details
- Dates: 28 March – 12 September 1965
- Teams: 18

All Ireland Champions
- Winners: Wexford (1st win)
- Captain: Willie O'Neill

All Ireland Runners-up
- Runners-up: Tipperary
- Captain: Owen Killoran

Provincial Champions
- Munster: Tipperary
- Leinster: Wexford
- Ulster: Antrim
- Connacht: Roscommon

The 1965 All-Ireland Under-21 Hurling Championship was the second staging of the All-Ireland Under-21 Hurling Championship. The championship began on 28 March 1965 and ended on 12 September 1965.

Wexford won the title after defeating Tipperary 3-7 to 1-4 in the final.

== Teams ==
A total of eighteen teams entered the under-21 championship, the same number as the previous year, however, there was a difference in the composition. In Munster, Kerry declined to field a team in spite of a spirited display against Galway the previous year. In Leinster, Carlow and Louth made way for Meath and Wicklow. An Ulster championship was organised for the first time, with Down joining provincial kingpins Antrim.

=== Team summaries ===
Connacht	Leinster	Munster	Ulster
Roscommon	Dublin; Kildare; Kilkenny; Laois; Mestmeath; Offaly; Westmeath; Wexford; Wicklow	Clare; Cork; Galway; Limerick; Tipperary; Waterford	Antrim; Down

== Leinster Under-21 Hurling Championship ==
=== Leinster final ===
25 July 1965 Final	Wexford	7-09 - 1-05	Dublin	Croke Park

== Munster Under-21 Hurling Championship ==
=== Munster quarter-finals ===
28 March 1965 Quarter-final	Cork	2-04 - 3-05	Tipperary	Kildorrery Grounds]
	JK Coleman 1-1, J McCarthy 1-0, G McCarthy 0-2, E O'Brien 0-1.		S Carroll 2-1, M Keating 1-1, D Bourke 0-1, F Loughnane 0-1, L Gaynor 0-1.	Referee: S Quaid (Limerick)

11 April 1965 Quarter-final	Clare	1-10 - 2-02	Limerick	Cusack Park
	M Kenny 1-3, D Kelly 0-3, N Pyne 0-3, G Stack 0-1.		P Cobb 2-0, E Cregan 0-2.	Referee: A Higgins (Galway)

11 April 1965 Quarter-final	Galway	7-07 - 3-01	Kerry	Gaelic Grounds
	F Coffey 2-3, T Connolly 2-0, M Davern 1-0, T O'Neill 1-0, E Lane 1-0, T Canavan 0-3, K Darcy 0-1.		P Finnegan 1-1, E Diggin 1-0, B O'Brien 1-0.

=== Munster semi-finals ===
2 May 1965 Semi-final	Galway	7-05 - 4-03	Waterford	Gaelic Grounds
	K Darcy 2-2, M Devlin 2-1, J Lane 2-0, P Connolly 1-2.		S Galvin 2-1, M McGrath 1-1, D Fitzgerald 1-1.

12 May 1965 Semi-final	Tipperary	5-11 - 5-04	Clare	Gaelic Grounds
	F Loughnane 1-6, M Keating 0-4, D Bourke 1-0, TJ Butler 1-0, S Carroll 1-0, J Ryan 1-0, PJ Ryan 0-1.		J Teefy 2-1, M Hanrahan 2-0, D Pyne 1-0, J Woods 0-1, M Kelly 0-1, N Pyne 0-1.	Referee: S O'Connor (Limerick)

=== Munster final ===
18 July 1965 Final	Galway	3-03 - 4-09	Tipperary	Duggan Park
	T O'Neill 1-0, B O'Connor 1-0, E Lane 1-0, F Coffey 0-2, JJ Kelly 0-1.		J Ryan 2-0, TJ Butler 1-1, P Ryan 0-4, D Bourke 1-0, F Loughnane 0-3, N Seymour 0-1.

== Ulster Under-21 Hurling Championship ==
=== Ulster final ===
25 July 1965 Final	Antrim	5-08 - 4-07	Down

== All-Ireland Under-21 Hurling Championship ==
=== All-Ireland semi-finals ===
15 August 1965 Semi-final	Tipperary	8-16 - 0-04	Roscommon	MacDonagh Park
	N Seymour 4-1, J Ryan 1-2, P Ryan 0-5, F Loughnane 0-4, N O'Gorman 1-0, PJ Ryan 1-0, S Carroll 1-0, G Quinlan 0-3, D Bourke 0-1.		F Cormican 0-3, M Craughwell 0-1.

22 August 1965 Semi-final	Wexford	8-13 - 0-04	Antrim	Gorey Grounds
	C Dowdall 2-6, T Maher 2-3, T Doran 2-0, S Baron 1-2, J Berry 1-0, W Murphy 0-1, W Bernie 0-1.		P Gavin 0-2, P McCamphill 0-1, B McParland 0-1.

=== All-Ireland final ===
12 September 1965 Final	Wexford	3-07 - 1-04	Tipperary	Nowlan Park
	PJ Doran 1-3, C Dowdall 1-1, T Maher 1-1, P Quigley 0-2.		M Keating 1-0, F Loughnane 0-2, J Quinlan 0-1, PJ Ryan 0-1.	Referee: J Duggan (Galway)
