= John Quigley (hurler) =

Irish hurler (born 1949)

Personal information
- Native name: Seán Ó Coigligh (Irish)
- Born: 1949 (age 76–77) Rathnure, County Wexford, Ireland
- Occupation: Clerk
- Height: 5 ft 10 in (178 cm)

Sport
- Sport: Hurling
- Position: Left wing-forward
Club
- Years: Club
- 1967-1987: Rathnure
Club titles
- Wexford titles: 9
- Leinster titles: 4
- All-Ireland Titles: 0
Inter-county
| Years | County | Apps (scores) |
| 1967-1977 | Wexford | 23 (4-41) |
Inter-county titles
- Leinster titles: 4
- All-Irelands: 1
- NHL: 1
- All Stars: 1

John Quigley (born 1949) is an Irish former hurler. At club level, he played with Rathnure and at inter-county level with the Wexford senior hurling team.

== Career ==
Quigley played hurling in all grades as a student at St Peter's College in Wexford. He was part of the St Peter's team that won the Leinster Colleges SHC title before later claiming a Dr Croke Cup medal after a 5-11 to 3-06 win over Limerick CBS in the 1967 All-Ireland colleges final replay.

At club level, Quigley first played for Rathnure at juvenile and underage levels and was part of the club's under-21 team that won the Wexford U21HC title in 1970. His 20-year senior team career yielded nine Wexford SHC titles between 1967 and 1986. Quigley also won four Leinster Club SHC medals during this period, however, Rathnure lost all of the subsequent All-Ireland club finals.

At inter-county level, Quigley first played for Wexford during a two-year tenure with the minor team. He won back-to-back Leinster MHC medals and was at corner-back when Wexford beat Cork by 4-01 to 1-08 in the 1966 All-Ireland minor final replay. Quigley later won two Leinster U21HC medals.

Quigley was just out of the minor grade when he made his senior team debut in 1967. He won a Leinster SHC medal in his debut season before later claiming an All-Ireland SHC medal after coming on as a substitute in the 5-08 to 3-12 victory over Tipperary in the 1968 All-Ireland final. Quigley won three more Leinster SHC medals - 1970, 1976 and 1977 - but faced defeat in each of the subsequent All-Ireland finals. He also claimed National Hurling League honours in 1973 and was named on the All-Star team in 1974.

Performances at inter-county level for Wexford resulted in Quigley being called up to the Leinster inter-provincial team. He won Railway Cup medals in 1971 and 1975 following defeats of Munster in those finals.

== Personal life ==
Quigley's brothers - Dan, Martin and Pat - also played with Rathnure and Wexford.

== Honours ==
St Peter's College

- All-Ireland Colleges Senior Hurling Championship: 1967
- Leinster Colleges Senior Hurling Championship: 1967

Rathnure

- Leinster Senior Club Hurling Championship: 1971, 1973, 1977, 1986
- Wexford Senior Hurling Championship: 1967, 1971, 1972, 1973, 1974, 1977, 1979, 1980, 1986
- Wexford Under-21 Hurling Championship: 1970

Wexford

- All-Ireland Senior Hurling Championship: 1968
- Leinster Senior Hurling Championship: 1968, 1970, 1976, 1977
- National Hurling League: 1972–73
- Leinster Under-21 Hurling Championship: 1969, 1970
- All-Ireland Minor Hurling Championship: 1966
- Leinster Minor Hurling Championship: 1966, 1967

Leinster

- Railway Cup: 1971, 1975
