= 2025 Wexford Senior Hurling Championship =

Annual hurling competition season

- Dates: 27 June - 26 October 2025
- Teams: 12
- Sponsor: Pettitt's SuperValu
- Champions: St Martin's (6th title); Conor Firman (captain); Daithí Hayes (manager)
- Runners-up: Rathnure; Stephen Martin (captain); Declan Ruth (manager)
- Relegated: Crossabeg–Ballymurn

Tournament statistics
- Matches played: 42
- Goals scored: 150 (3.57 per match)
- Points scored: 1406 (33.48 per match)
- Top scorer(s): Séamus Casey (3-70)

The 2025 Wexford Senior Hurling Championship was the 115th staging of the Wexford Senior Hurling Championship since its establishment by the Wexford County Board in 1889. The draw for the group stage places took place on 8 February 2025. The championship ran from 27 June to 26 October 2025.

St Martin's entered the championship as the defending champions.

The final was played on 26 October 2025 at Chadwicks Wexford Park, between St Martin's and Rathnure, in what was their second meeting in the final overall and a first meeting in 26 years. St Martin's won the match by 2-14 to 0-16 to claim their sixth championship title overall and a second consecutive title.

Oylegate–Glenbrien's Séamus Casey was the championship's top scorer with 3-70.

== Team changes ==
=== To Championship ===
Promoted from the Wexford Intermediate Hurling Championship

- Rathnure

=== From Championship ===
Relegated to the Wexford Intermediate Hurling Championship

- Cloughbawn

== Group A ==
=== Group A table ===
Advance to quarter-finals Advance to preliminary quarter-finals

Team	Matches				Score			Pts
Team	Pld	W	D	L	For	Against	Diff	Pts
Rathnure	5	5	0	0	131	88	43	10
St Anne's Rathangan	5	3	1	1	100	83	17	7
Naomh Éanna	5	2	1	2	106	95	11	5
Ferns St Aidan's	5	2	0	3	111	111	0	4
Oylegate–Glenbrien	5	2	0	3	95	112	-17	4
Crossabeg–Ballymurn	5	0	0	5	77	131	-54	0

=== Group A results ===
28 June 2025 Round 1	St Anne's Rathangan	0-20 - 0-11	Oylegate–Glenbrien	Hollymount Grounds

28 June 2025 Round 1	Naomh Éanna	3-12 - 0-16	Ferns St Aidan's	Chadwicks Wexford Park

28 June 2025 Round 1	Crossabeg–Ballymurn	1-12 - 3-19	Rathnure	McCauley Park

4 July 2025 Round 2	St Anne's Rathangan	1-23 - 1-12	Ferns St Aidan's	McCauley Park

4 July 2025 Round 2	Oylegate–Glenbrien	3-14 - 1-15	Crossabeg–Ballymurn	Samaritans St Patrick's Park

5 July 2025 Round 2	Rathnure	1-24 - 0-18	Naomh Éanna	Chadwicks Wexford Park

26 July 2025 Round 3	St Anne's Rathangan	1-16 - 0-16	Crossabeg–Ballymurn	Chadwicks Wexford Park

26 July 2025 Round 3	Rathnure	3-18 - 0-20	Ferns St Aidan's	Chadwicks Wexford Park

26 July 2025 Round 3	Oylegate–Glenbrien	0-17 - 0-15	Naomh Éanna	McCauley Park

2 August 2025 Round 4	St Anne's Rathangan	0-16 - 1-19	Rathnure	Chadwicks Wexford Park

3 August 2025 Round 4	Naomh Éanna	6-15 - 0-16	Crossabeg–Ballymurn	Chadwicks Wexford Park

3 August 2025 Round 4	Oylegate–Glenbrien	0-25 - 1-29	Ferns St Aidan's	Chadwicks Wexford Park

7 September 2025 Round 5	Crossabeg–Ballymurn	0-12 - 2-22	Ferns St Aidan's	McCauley Park

7 September 2025 Round 5	Rathnure	2-21 - 1-16	Oylegate–Glenbrien	O'Kennedy Park

7 September 2025 Round 5	St Anne's Rathangan	1-16 - 0-19	Naomh Éanna	Chadwicks Wexford Park

== Group B ==
=== Group B table ===
Advance to quarter-finals Advance to preliminary quarter-finals

Team	Matches				Score			Pts
Team	Pld	W	D	L	For	Against	Diff	Pts
St Martin's	5	5	0	0	123	81	42	10
Faythe Harriers	5	3	0	2	102	112	-10	6
Shelmaliers	5	3	0	2	100	104	-4	6
Rapparees	5	1	1	3	110	113	-3	3
Glynn–Barntown	5	1	1	3	97	109	-12	3
Oulart–the Ballagh	5	1	0	4	101	114	-13	2

=== Group B results ===
27 June 2025 Round 1	St Martin's	1-26 - 0-12	Faythe Harriers	McCauley Park

27 June 2025 Round 1	Shelmaliers	0-21 - 2-14	Rapparees	Chadwicks Wexford Park

28 June 2025 Round 1	Oulart–the Ballagh	1-19 - 1-20	Glynn–Barntown	Chadwicks Wexford Park

4 July 2025 Round 2	St Martin's	3-12 - 1-14	Rapparees	O'Kennedy Park

4 July 2025 Round 2	Glynn–Barntown	2-13 - 0-21	Shelmaliers	Chadwicks Wexford Park

5 July 2025 Round 2	Faythe Harriers	0-18 - 0-16	Oulart–the Ballagh	Chadwicks Wexford Park

25 July 2025 Round 3	Faythe Harriers	0-23 - 2-13	Shelmaliers	McCauley Park

25 July 2025 Round 3	Glynn–Barntown	2-14 - 1-17	Rapparees	Chadwicks Wexford Park

26 July 2025 Round 3	St Martin's	3-19 - 1-15	Oulart–the Ballagh	McCauley Park

31 July 2025 Round 4	Faythe Harriers	1-23 - 2-24	Rapparees	Chadwicks Wexford Park

1 August 2025 Round 4	Oulart–the Ballagh	3-11 - 1-19	Shelmaliers	McCauley Park

2 August 2025 Round 4	St Martin's	1-20 - 0-17	Glynn–Barntown	Chadwicks Wexford Park

7 September 2025 Round 5	Oulart–the Ballagh	3-16 - 0-23	Rapparees	Chadwicks Wexford Park

7 September 2025 Round 5	Faythe Harriers	0-23 - 2-12	Glynn–Barntown	McCauley Park

7 September 2025 Round 5	St Martin's	2-16 - 0-17	Shelamliers	O'Kennedy Park

== Knockout stage ==
=== Preliminary quarter-finals ===
12 September 2025 Pre quarter-final	Oylegate–Glenbrien	4-20 - 6-20	Oulart–the Ballagh	Chadwicks Wexford Park

13 September 2025 Pre quarter-final	Glynn–Barntown	1-16 - 2-12	Crossabeg–Ballymurn	Chadwicks Wexford Park

14 September 2025 Pre quarter-final	Shelmaliers	2-13 - 2-14	Ferns St Aidan's	Chadwicks Wexford Park

14 September 2025 Pre quarter-final	Naomh Éanna	6-17 - 1-14	Rapparees	Chadwicks Wexford Park

=== Relegation playoff ===
11 October 2025 Relegation playoff	Oylegate–Glenbrien	2-21 - 1-10	Crossabeg–Ballymurn	Chadwicks Wexford Park

=== Quarter-finals ===
27 September 2025 Quarter-final	Faythe Harriers	0-14 - 1-19	Ferns St Aidan's	Chadwicks Wexford Park
		Report

27 September 2025 Quarter-final	St Anne's Rathangan	0-21 - 2-17	Naomh Éanna	Chadwicks Wexford Park
		Report

28 September 2025 Quarter-final	Rathnure	4-24 - 1-13	Glynn–Barntown	Chadwicks Wexford Park
		Report

28 September 2025 Quarter-final	St Martin's	4-18 - 1-10	Oulart–the Ballagh	Chadwicks Wexford Park
		Report

=== Semi-finals ===
12 October 2025 Semi-final	Naomh Éanna	1-15 - 0-21	Rathnure	Chadwicks Wexford Park

12 October 2025 Semi-final	St Martin's	1-22 - 3-09	Ferns St Aidan's	Chadwicks Wexford Park

=== Final ===
26 October 2025 Final	Rathnure	0-16 - 2-14	St Martin's	Chadwicks Wexford Park
		Report

== Championship statistics ==
=== Top scorers ===
Rank	Player	Club	Tally	Total	Matches	Average
1	Séamus Casey	Oylegate-Glenbrien	3-70	79	7	11.28
2	Jack Redmond	Rathnure	2-67	73	8	9.12
3	Ross Banville	Shelmaliers	1-56	59	6	9.83
3	Lee Chin	Faythe Harriers	0-59	59	6	9.83
