= 2011 Wexford Senior Hurling Championship =

Annual hurling competition season

- Sponsor: Pettitt's SuperValu
- Champions: Oulart–The Ballagh (9th title); Keith Rossiter (captain); Liam Dunne (manager)
- Runners-up: Rathnure
- Relegated: Askamore

The 2011 Wexford Senior Hurling Championship was the 101st completed staging of the Wexford Senior Hurling Championship since its establishment by the Wexford County Board in 1889.

Oulart–The Ballagh entered the championship as the defending champions.

The final was played on 9 October 2011 at Wexford Park, between Oulart–The Ballagh and Rathnure, in what was their fourth meeting in the final overall and a first meeting in the final in five years. Oulart–The Ballagh won the match by 1-10 to 0-11 to claim their ninth championship title overall and a third title in succession.

== Relegation stage ==
=== Relegation group stage table ===
Relegated

Team	Matches				Score			Pts
Team	Pld	W	D	L	For	Against	Diff	Pts
Shelmaliers	2	1	0	1	29	27	2	2
St Anne's	2	1	0	1	26	24	2	2
Askamore	2	1	0	1	24	28	-4	2

=== Relegation group stage results ===
18 September 2011 Round 1	Shelmaliers	2-10 - 0-11	St Anne's	St Martin's Grounds
		Report

1 October 2011 Round 2	Askamore	0-08 - 2-09	St Anne's	Bellefield Grounds
		Report

15 October 2011 Round 3	Askamore	2-10 - 1-10	Shelmaliers	Monamolin Grounds
		Report

== Knockout stage ==
=== Quarter-finals ===
3 September 2011 Quarter-final	Oulart–The Ballagh	3-21 - 1-08	St Martin's	Wexford Park

3 September 2011 Quarter-final	Buffers Alley	3-15 - 0-17	Rapparees	Wexford Park

4 September 2011 Quarter-final	Rathnure	5-18 - 0-11	Glynn–Barntown	Bellefield Grounds

4 September 2011 Quarter-final	Cloughbawn	2-18 - 4-11	Faythe Harriers	Bellefield Grounds

=== Semi-finals ===
25 September 2011 Semi-final	Oulart–The Ballagh	2-20 - 1-13	Buffers Alley	Wexford Park

25 September 2011 Semi-final	Rathnure	2-18 - 0-15	Cloughbawn	Wexford Park

=== Final ===
9 October 2011 Final	Oulart–The Ballagh	1-10 - 0-11	Rathnure	Wexford Park
	F Cullen 1-1, R Jacob, N Kirwan (2f), S Murphy 0-2 each, G Sinnott, S Doyle, D Redmond all 0-1 each.	Report	P Codd 0-10 (9f, 1 '65'), R Codd 0-1.

== See also ==
- Wexford Senior Hurling Championship
- 2010 Wexford Senior Hurling Championship
- 2012 Wexford Senior Hurling Championship
- 2011 All-Ireland Senior Hurling Championship
