= 1996 Wexford Senior Hurling Championship =

Annual hurling competition season

- Dates: 15 September – 27 October 1996
- Teams: 13
- Champions: Rathnure (16th title); John Conran (captain)
- Runners-up: Rapparees; Garret Kavanagh (captain)

Tournament statistics
- Matches played: 13
- Goals scored: 21 (1.62 per match)
- Points scored: 255 (19.62 per match)

The 1996 Wexford Senior Hurling Championship was the 86th completed staging of the Wexford Senior Hurling Championship since its establishment by the Wexford County Board in 1889. The championship ran from 15 September to 27 October 1996.

Oulart–The Ballagh entered the championship as the defending champions, however, they were beaten by Rathnure in the semi-finals.

The final was played on 27 October 1996 at Wexford Park, between Rathnure and Rapparees, in what was their third meeting in the final overall and a first meeting in the final in 18 years. Rathnure won the match by 1–12 to 0–07 to claim their 16th championship title overall and a first title in six years.

== Results ==
=== First round ===
15 September 1996 First round	Cloughbawn	1-10 - 0-08	Duffry Rovers

22 September 1996 First round	Glynn–Barntown	2-16 - 0-14	Buffers Alley
	G Ryan 2-1, T Kehoe 0-7, C Roche 0-2, PJ Carley 0-2, J Laffan 0-2, I Wickham 0-2.		T Dempsey 0-7, P Donoghue 0-2, E Sinnott 0-1, M Foley 0-1, P Hammell 0-1.

22 September 1996 First round	Half–Way–House/Bunclody	0-08 - 1-05	Fethard St Mogue's

22 September 1996 First round	Rapparees	1-13 - 0-10	St Martin's	Wexford Park
	C McBride 0-6, M Murphy 1-2, A Fenlon 0-2, B Kehoe 0-2, R Furlong 0-1.		J O'Connor 0-4, R McCarthy 0-2, L Turley 0-2, A O'Connor 0-1, G O'Connor 0-1.

22 September 1996 First round	Rathnure	2-18 - 0-11	Crossabeg–Ballymurn	Bellefield Grounds
	R Guiney 1-2, B O'Leary 1-1, M Morrissey 0-4, P Codd 0-4, M Byrne 0-2, J Holohan 0-2, A Codd 0-2, A Coleman 0-1.		M Doyle 0-4, N McDonald 0-2, L O'Leary 0-2, J McDonald 0-1, C McDonald 0-1, D McDonald 0-1.

29 September 1996 First round replay	Half–Way–House/Bunclody	0-11 - 1-09	Fethard St Mogue's

=== Quarter-finals ===
29 September 1996 Quarter-final	Oulart–The Ballagh	2-07 - 1-07	Glynn–Barntown

29 September 1996 Quarter-final	Rapparees	2-06 - 0-05	Faythe Harriers

29 September 1996 Quarter-final	Rathnure	0-13 - 0-11	Oylegate–Glenbrien

12 October 1996 Quarter-final	Cloughbawn	2-11 - 1-07	Fethard St Mogue's	O'Kennedy Park
	M Redmond 1-4, L Murphy 1-2, J Fleming 0-3, B Redmond 0-2.		W Dunphy 1-1, S Colfer 0-3, J Byrne 0-2, J Waters 0-1.

=== Semi-finals ===
13 October 1996 Semi-final	Rathnure	2-11 - 0-10	Oulart–The Ballagh	Wexford Park
	P Codd 1-6, M Morrissey 1-1, C Byrne 0-2, J Holohan 0-2.		L Dunne 0-2, D O'Connor 0-2, S Dunne 0-2, M Storey 0-1, P Redmond 0-1, M Redmond 0-1, B O'Connor 0-1.

20 October 1996 Semi-final	Rapparees	2-08 - 0-07	Cloughbawn	Wexford Park
	B Kehoe 1-2, C McBride 0-4, M Murphy 1-0, A Fenlon 0-2.		B Redmond 0-2, D Byrne 0-1, J Flood 0-1, D Kehoe 0-1, P Carton 0-1, M Redmond 0-1.

=== Final ===
27 October 1996 Final	Rathnure	1-12 - 0-07	Rapparees	Wexford Park
	J Holohan 1-4, P Codd 0-4, R Guiney 0-2, M Byrne 0-1, A Codd 0-1.		C McBride 0-5, D Kavanagh 0-1, A Fenlon 0-1.
