= 2012 Wexford Senior Hurling Championship =

Annual hurling competition season

- Dates: May – 14 October 2012
- Teams: 12
- Sponsor: Pettitt's SuperValu
- Champions: Oulart–The Ballagh (10th title); Keith Rossiter (captain); Pat Herbert (manager)
- Runners-up: Faythe Harriers; Jim Berry (captain); Iggy Clarke (manager)
- Relegated: Buffers Alley

The 2012 Wexford Senior Hurling Championship was the 102nd completed staging of the Wexford Senior Hurling Championship since its establishment by the Wexford County Board in 1889. The championship ran from May to 14 October 2012.

Oulart–The Ballagh entered the championship as the defending champions. 12-time champions Buffers Alley's relegation brought an end to 46 years of top tier hurling for the club.

The final was played on 14 October 2012 at Wexford Park, between Oulart–The Ballagh and Faythe Harriers, in what was their first ever meeting in the final. Oulart–The Ballagh won the match by 2-12 to 0-13 to claim their 10th championship title overall and a fourth title in succession.

== Team changes ==
=== To Championship ===
Promoted from the Wexford Intermediate Hurling Championship

- Adamstown

=== From Championship ===
Relegated to the Wexford Intermediate Hurling Championship

- Askamore

== Group A ==
=== Group A table ===
Quarter-finalists Relegation playoff

Team	Matches				Pts
Team	Pld	W	D	L	Pts
Faythe Harriers	5	3	1	1	7
Shelmaliers	5	3	0	2	6
Rathnure	5	3	0	2	6
Ferns St Aidan's	5	2	1	2	5
Buffers Alley	5	2	0	3	4
Glynn–Barntown	5	1	0	4	2

== Group B ==
=== Group B table ===
Quarter-finalists Relegation playoff

Team	Matches				Pts
Team	Pld	W	D	L	Pts
Oulart–The Ballagh	5	5	0	0	10
St Anne's	5	2	1	2	5
St Martin's	5	2	1	2	5
Adamstown	5	2	0	3	4
Rapparees	5	1	1	3	3
Cloughbawn	5	1	1	3	3

== Relegation stage ==
=== Relegation semi-finals ===
1 September 2012 Semi-final	Rapparees	2-13 - 3-09	Glynn–Barntown	Oylegate Grounds
	K Foley 2-2, R Fox 0-5, A Ronan 0-3, T Foley 0-1, D Ruth 0-1, J Cullen 0-1.		B Doyle 3-0, P Carley 0-8, S Gubbins 0-1.

1 September 2012 Semi-final	Cloughbawn	2-10 - 2-09	Buffers Alleys	St Patrick's Park
	M Kehoe 1-0, E Buckley 1-0, P Foley 0-3, J Lawlor 0-2, H Kehoe 0-2, B Carton 0-1, C Kehoe 0-1, A Carton 0-1.		B Kenny 1-0, P Doran 1-0, K Burke 0-3, P Kenny 0-3, A Kenny 0-1, K Roche 0-1, C Kenny 0-1.

=== Relegation final ===
15 September 2012 Final	Glynn–Barntown	2-16 - 3-12	Buffers Alley	Bellefield Grounds
	P Carley 1-7, G Moore 1-2, M Doyle 0-3, C Doyle 0-2, B Doyle 0-1, M O'Regan 0-1.		A Kenny 2-1, K Burke 0-4, P Doran 1-0, T O'Leary 0-3, J Foley 0-2, S Óg Whelan 0-1, W Doran 0-1.

== Knockout stage ==
=== Quarter-finals ===
1 September 2012 Quarter-final	Rathnure	2-21 - 3-15	St Anne's	Wexford Park
	P Codd 1-8, T Hogan 1-3, R Flynn 0-3, R Codd 0-3, N Higgins 0-2, B O'Leary 0-2.		D O'Connor 0-6, L Rochford 1-2, L Óg McGovern 1-2, M Furlong 1-0, J Fogarty 0-3, D O'Keeffe 0-1, P White 0-1.

1 September 2012 Quarter-final	Oulart–The Ballagh	1-25 - 0-17 (aet)	Ferns St Aidan's	Wexford Park
	R Jacob 1-5, C O'Leary 0-5, N Kirwan 0-4, C Goff 0-2, D Mythen 0-2, M Jacob 0-2, D Nolan 0-1, S Murphy 0-1, S Doyle 0-1, D Redmond 0-1, G Sinnott 0-1.	Report	T Dwyer 0-7, P Morris 0-3, I Byrne 0-3, P Farrell 0-1, C O'Connor 0-1, E Cullen 0-1, J Dwyer 0-1.

2 September 2012 Quarter-final	Faythe Harriers	1-16 - 0-10	Adamstown	Wexford Park
	J Berry 0-7, P Lambert 1-1, K Gore 0-3, R Clarke 0-2, P Farrell 0-2, L Chin 0-1.		T French 0-6, P Whitty 0-2, PJ Carroll 0-1, T Furlong 0-1.

2 September 2012 Quarter-final	Shelmaliers	2-16 - 2-13	St Martin's	Wexford Park
	C O'Shaughnessy 1-5, J Kelly 0-5, C Byrne 1-0, S Banville 0-3, E Doyle 0-2, T Barron 0-1, A Griffith 0-1.		D Lyng 0-7, M Butler 2-0, P Kelly 0-1, M Maloney 0-1, D Waters 0-1, K Price 0-1, C Lyng 0-1, R Devereux 0-1.

=== Semi-finals ===
22 September 2012 Semi-final	Faythe Harriers	0-19 - 2-09	Rathnure	Wexford Park
	J Berry 0-8, P Lambert 0-3, K Gore 0-3, L Chin 0-2, E Keeling 0-1, C Hefferan 0-1, R Clarke 0-1.		P Codd 0-6, R Codd 1-2, T Hogan 1-1.

22 September 2012 Semi-final	Oulart–The Ballagh	1-19 - 2-11	Shelmaliers	Wexford Park
	N Kirwan 1-7, D Redmond 0-3, G Sinnott 0-3, D Mythen 0-3, R Jacob 0-2, F Cullen 0-1.		J Kelly 0-6, C O'Shaughnessy 1-1, C Byrne 1-0, C Lawlor 0-1, B Doyle 0-1, S Banville 0-1, T Barron 0-1.

=== Final ===
14 October 2012 Final	Oulart–The Ballagh	2-12 - 0-13	Faythe Harriers	Wexford Park
	N Kirwan (2f), R Jacob 1-3 each, D Redmond 0-3, G Sinnott, D Mythen, P Murphy 0-1 each.		K Gore 0-5, J Berry 0-3 (2f), R Clarke 0-2 (1f), C Keeling, W Mallon, P Lambert 0-1 each.
