= 2026 Wexford Senior Hurling Championship =

Annual hurling competition season

- Dates: 26 June - 25 October 2026
- Teams: 12
- Sponsor: Pettitt's SuperValu
- Champions: Shelmaliers (3rd title)
- Runners-up: Rathnure
- Relegated: Rapparees

Tournament statistics
- Matches played: 40

The 2026 Wexford Senior Hurling Championship was the 116th staging of the Wexford Senior Hurling Championship since its establishment by the Wexford County Board in 1889. The draw for the group stage places took place on 7 February 2026.

St Martin's are the defending champions.

Shelmaliers became champions after beating Rathnure 1-18 to 2-13 to claim their 3rd Senior championship.

== Team changes ==
=== To Championship ===
Promoted from the Wexford Intermediate Hurling Championship

- Fethard St Mogue's

=== From Championship ===
Relegated to the Wexford Intermediate Hurling Championship

- Crossabeg–Ballymurn

== Format change ==
Compared to the previous years, there is a slight format change. The top 3 of each group qualify directly to the quarter-finals while the 4th placed teams face the 5th placed team of the other group in two preliminary quarter-finals. The winner faces the 1st placed team in the quarter-finals. The 6th placed teams face each other in a relegation final.

== Group A ==
=== Group A table ===
Advance to quarter-finals Advance to preliminary quarter-finals Advance to relegation final

Team	Matches				Score			Pts
Team	Pld	W	D	L	For	Against	Diff	Pts
Shelmaliers	5	4	1	0	121	104	17	9
St Martin's	5	3	1	1	114	89	25	7
Naomh Éanna	5	3	0	2	115	104	11	6
St Anne's Rathangan	5	2	0	3	93	96	-3	4
Faythe Harriers	5	2	0	3	100	104	-4	4
Fethard St Mogue's	5	0	0	5	84	130	-46	0

=== Group A results ===
26 June 2026 Round 1	Naomh Éanna	3-16 - 0-16	St Mogue's Fethard	Chadwicks Wexford Park
		Report

27 June 2026 Round 1	Shelmaliers	1-19 - 2-15	Faythe Harriers	McCauley Park Bellefield
		Report

27 June 2026 Round 1	St Martin's	0-20 - 0-12	St Anne's Rathangan	McCauley Park Bellefield
		Report

2 July 2026 Round 2	Faythe Harriers	2-20 - 2-16	Naomh Éanna	Chadwicks Wexford Park
		Report

4 July 2026 Round 2	St Anne's Rathangan	1-16 - 1-22	Shelmaliers	McCauley Park Bellefield
		Report

5 July 2026 Round 2	St Martin's	3-20 - 0-16	St Mogue's Fethard	O'Kennedy Park
		Report

24 July 2026 Round 3	Faythe Harriers	1-19 - 0-11	St Mogue's Fethard	O'Kennedy Park
		Report

24 July 2026 Round 3	St Martin's	1-15 - 0-18	Shelmaliers	McCauley Park Bellefield
		Report

25 July 2026 Round 3	St Anne's Rathangan	0-19 - 2-14	Naomh Éanna	McCauley Park Bellefield
		Report

1 August 2026 Round 4	St Anne's Rathangan	1-20 - 0-17	St Mogue's Fethard	Chadwicks Wexford Park

2 August 2026 Round 4	Shelmaliers	0-25 - 2-16	Naomh Éanna	Chadwicks Wexford Park
		Report

2 August 2026 Round 4	St Martin's	2-23 - 1-14	Faythe Harriers	Chadwicks Wexford Park
		Report

23 August 2026 Round 5	St Anne's Rathangan	0-20 - 1-11	Faythe Harriers	Chadwicks Wexford Park

23 August 2026 Round 5	St Martin's	0-18 - 1-23	Naomh Éanna	McCauley Park Bellefield

23 August 2026 Round 5	Shelmaliers	2-25 - 1-21	St Mogue's Fethard	O'Kennedy Park

== Group B ==
=== Group B table ===
Advance to quarter-finals Advance to preliminary quarter-finals Advance to relegation final

Team	Matches				Score			Pts
Team	Pld	W	D	L	For	Against	Diff	Pts
Rathnure	5	4	0	1	114	106	8	8
Oylegate–Glenbrien	5	3	0	2	99	96	3	6
Ferns St Aidan's	5	2	1	2	106	97	9	5
Oulart–the Ballagh	5	2	0	3	98	104	-6	4
Glynn–Barntown	5	2	0	3	114	118	-4	4
Rapparees	5	1	1	3	100	110	-10	3

=== Group B results ===
26 June 2026 Round 1	Rapparees	0-14 - 1-16	Oulart-The Ballagh	Oylegate
		Report

26 June 2026 Round 1	Rathnure	2-22 - 3-17	Glynn-Barntown	McCauley Park Bellefield
		Report

27 June 2026 Round 1	Ferns St Aidan's	1-13 - 1-14	Oylegate-Glenbrien	Bree
		Report

3 July 2026 Round 2	Glynn Barntown	1-16 - 2-20	Rapparees	O'Kennedy Park
		Report

4 July 2026 Round 2	Rathnure	1-20 - 0-15	Oylegate-Glenbrien	Bree
		Report

5 July 2026 Round 2	Oulart-The Ballagh	1-20 - 1-23	Ferns St Aidan's	McCauley Park Bellefield
		Report

24 July 2026 Round 3	Rathnure	2-20 - 1-19	Rapparees	Bree
		Report

25 July 2026 Round 3	Oulart-The Ballagh	0-13 - 0-21	Oylegate-Glenbrien	McCauley Park Bellefield
		Report

25 July 2026 Round 3	Glynn-Barntown	1-21 - 1-16	Ferns St Aidan's	Samaritans St. Patrick's Park

31 July 2026 Round 4	Glynn Barntown	0-25 - 0-19	Oylegate-Glenbrien	McCauley Park Bellefield

31 July 2026 Round 4	Rapparees	1-16 - 1-16	Ferns St Aidan's	Chadwicks Wexford Park
		Report

1 August 2026 Round 4	Rathnure	1-20 - 0-17	Oulart-The Ballagh	McCauley Park Bellefield
		Report

23 August 2026 Round 5	Rathnure	1-11 - 0-26	Ferns St Aidan's	McCauley Park Bellefield

23 August 2026 Round 5	Rapparees	1-16 - 1-24	Oylegate-Glenbrien	Chadwicks Wexford Park
		Report

23 August 2026 Round 5	Glynn Barntown	2-14 - 2-20	Oulart-The Ballagh	Samaritans St. Patrick's Park

== Relegation Final ==
11 September 2026 Relegation final	Rapparees	1-21 - 2-19	Fethard St Mogue's	Chadwicks Wexford Park
		Report

== Preliminary Quarter-Finals ==
13 September 2026 Preliminary Quarter-final	Faythe Harriers	1-21 - 3-13	Oulart–the Ballagh	Chadwicks Wexford Park
		Report

13 September 2026 Preliminary Quarter-final	Glynn–Barntown	0-22 - 1-24	St Anne's Rathangan	Chadwicks Wexford Park
		Report

== Quarter-Finals ==
26 September 2026 Quarter-final	Rathnure	2-20 - 0-13	St Anne's Rathangan	Chadwicks Wexford Park

26 September 2026 Quarter-final	Oylegate–Glenbrien	6-23 - 9-17	Naomh Éanna	Chadwicks Wexford Park

27 September 2026 Quarter-final	St Martin's	2-19 - 0-19	Ferns St Aidan's	Chadwicks Wexford Park

27 September 2026 Quarter-final	Shelmaliers	2-20 - 1-21	Faythe Harriers	Chadwicks Wexford Park

== Semi-Finals ==
11 October 2026 Semi-final	Shelmaliers	2-16 - 1-13	Naomh Éanna	Chadwicks Wexford Park
		Report

11 October 2026 Semi-final	Rathnure	0-21 - 0-15	St Martin's	Chadwicks Wexford Park
		Report

== Final ==
25 October 2026 Final	Rathnure	2-13 - 1-18	Shelmaliers	Chadwicks Wexford Park
		Report
