= 2002 Wexford Senior Hurling Championship =

Annual hurling competition season

- Champions: Rathnure (18th title)
- Runners-up: Cloughbawn

The 2002 Wexford Senior Hurling Championship was the 92nd completed staging of the Wexford Senior Hurling Championship since its establishment by the Wexford County Board in 1889.

Faythe Harriers entered the championship as the defending champions.

The final was played on 20 October 2002 at Wexford Park, between Rathnure and Cloghbawn, in what was their fourth meeting in the final overall and a first meeting in the final in 12 years. Rathnure won the match by 1-10 to 2-05 to claim their 18th championship title overall and a first title in four years.

== Results ==
=== Final ===
| 20 October 2002 Final | Rathnure | 1-10 - 2-05 | Cloughbawn | Wexford Park |
| | P Codd 0-5, T Hogan 1-0, N Higgins 0-3, M Byrne, B O'Leary 0-1 each. | | S Flood 1-2, A Carton 1-0, M Kehoe 0-2, J O'Connor 0-1. |
