= 2017 Wexford Senior Hurling Championship =

Annual hurling competition season

- Champions: St Martin's (3rd title); Patrick O'Connor (captain); Ciarán Lyng (captain)
- Runners-up: Oulart–The Ballagh; Nicky Kirwan (captain)

The 2017 Wexford Senior Hurling Championship was the 107th staging of the Wexford Senior Hurling Championship since its establishment by the Wexford County Board in 1889.

Oulart–The Ballagh were the defending champions.

The final was played on 22 October 2017 at Innovate Wexford Park in Wexford, between Oulart–The Ballagh and St Martin's, in what was their sixth meeting in the final overall and a first final meeting in two years. Oulart–The Ballagh won the match by 2–16 to 1–09 to claim their third championship title overall and a first title in nine years.

== Knockout stage ==
=== Final ===
22 October 2017 Final	St Martin's	2-16 - 1-09	Oulart–The Ballagh	Innovate Wexford Park
	C Lyng 1-2, R O'Connor 0-5 (4f), J Firman and J Coleman 0-3 each, Joe O'Connor 1-0, D Waters, P Kelly and Jack O'Connor 0-1 each.	Report	N Kirwan 0-6fs, G Sinnott 1-1, K Sheridan and D Redmond 0-1 each.
