= 2014 Wexford Senior Hurling Championship =

Annual hurling competition season

The 2014 Wexford Senior Hurling Championship was the 104th staging of the Wexford Senior Hurling Championship since its establishment by the Wexford County Board in 1896. The championship began on 9 May 2014 and ended on 26 October 2014.

Oulart–The Ballagh were the defending champions; however, they were defeated at the quarter-final stage. St Abban's Adamstown were relegated from the championship. Shelmaliers won the title following a 3–8 to 1–11 defeat of St Anne's Rathangan in a replay of the final.

== Results ==
=== Relegation play-off ===
20 September 2014 Relegation play-off	Faythe Harriers	0-17 - 0-11	St Abban's Adamstown	Monageer
16:00

=== Quarter-finals ===
20 September 2014 Quarter-final	St Anne's Rathangan	2-14 - 0-14	Buffers Alley	Wexford Park
13:00				Referee: J Heffernan

20 September 2014 Quarter-final	Shelmaliers	0-22 - 1-17	Rapparees	Wexford Park
14:30				Referee: J Carton

20 September 2014 Quarter-final	Oulart–The Ballagh	0-19 - 1-17	Glynn–Barntown	Bellefield
16:00				Referee: J Owens

20 September 2014 Quarter-final	Rathnure	v	Ferns St Aidan's	Bellefield
17:30				Referee: S Whelan

=== Semi-finals ===
5 October 2014 Semi-final	St Anne's Rathangan	2-9 - 0-11	Glynn–Barntown	Wexford Park
15:00

5 October 2014 Semi-final	Shelamaliers	1-11 - 0-11	Ferns St Aidan's	Wexford Park
16:30

=== Final ===
19 October 2014 Final	St Anne's Rathangan	1-10 - 0-13	Shelamaliers	Wexford Park
	L Rochford (1-1), D O’Keeffe (0-4 frees), A Rochford (0-2), P White (0-2), J Fogarty (0-1).	Report	J Kelly (0-7, 0-3 frees, 0-2 65s), C O’Shaughnessy (0-3), S Banville (0-1), E Doyle (0-1), B Doyle (0-1).	Referee: J Carton (Monageer–Boolavogue)

26 October 2014 Final replay	St. Anne's Rathangan	3-8 - 1-11	Shelamaliers	Wexford Park
	D O’Keeffe 1-5, 0-5 frees; L Og McGovery 0-2; L Rochford, M Furlong, D O’Connor, D Fogarty 0-3 each.	Report	J Kelly 2-7, 0-5 frees, 0-1 sideline cut; E Nolan 1-0; B Malone 0-1.	Referee: J Owens (Kilrush–Askamore)

== Championship statistics ==
=== Miscellaneous ===
- Shelmaliers qualified for the final for the first time in the history of the championship. They subsequently claimed their very first senior crown.
