= 1998 Wexford Senior Hurling Championship =

Annual hurling competition season

- Champions: Rathnure (17th title)
- Runners-up: Rapparees

The 1998 Wexford Senior Hurling Championship was the 88th completed staging of the Wexford Senior Hurling Championship since its establishment by the Wexford County Board in 1889.

Oulart–The Ballagh entered the championship as the defending champions.

The final was played on 25 October 1998 at O'Kennedy Park in New Ross, between Rathnure and Rapparees, in what was their fourth meeting in the final overall and a first meeting in the final in two years. Rathnure won the match by 0–13 to 0–12 to claim their 17th championship title overall and a first title in two years.

== Results ==
=== Final ===
25 October 1998 Final	Rathnure	0-13 - 0-12	Rapparees	O'Kennedy Park
	M O'Leary (0-4), P Codd (0-3), A Codd (0-2), M Morrissey (0-2), M Byrne (0-1), B O'Leary (0-1).		O O'Connor (0-5), M Walsh (0-2), B Kehoe (0-2), J Kelly (0-1), T Mahon (0-1), R Quigley (0-1).
