= 1991 Wexford Senior Hurling Championship =

Annual hurling competition season

- Champions: Buffers Alley (11th title)
- Runners-up: Faythe Harriers

The 1991 Wexford Senior Hurling Championship was the 81st completed staging of the Wexford Senior Hurling Championship since its establishment by the Wexford County Board in 1889.

Rathnure entered the championship as the defending champions.

The final, was played on 6 October 1991 at Wexford Park, between Buffers Alley and Faythe Harriers, in what was their fifth meeting in the final overall and a first meeting in six years. Buffers Alley won the match by 2–10 to 1–07 to claim their 11th championship title overall and a first title in two years.

== Results ==
=== Final ===
6 October 1991 Final	Buffers Alley	2-10 - 1-07	Faythe Harriers	Wexford Park
	J Gahan 2-0, T Dempsey 0-5, M Foley 0-2, P Gahan 0-1, P Donoghue 0-1, S O'Leary 0-1.		L O'Gorman 1-1, J Browne 0-4, L Murphy 0-1, K Murphy 0-1.
