= 2001 Wexford Senior Hurling Championship =

Annual hurling competition season

- Champions: Faythe Harriers (5th title)
- Runners-up: Rapparees

The 2001 Wexford Senior Hurling Championship was the 91st completed staging of the Wexford Senior Hurling Championship since its establishment by the Wexford County Board in 1889.

St Anne's entered the championship as the defending champions.

The final was played on 11 November 2001 at Wexford Park, between Faythe Harriers and Rapparees, in what was their first ever meeting in the final. Faythe Harriers won the match by 0–13 to 0–09 to claim their fifth championship title overall and a first title in 20 years.

== Results ==
=== Final ===
11 November 2001 Final	Faythe Harriers	0-13 - 0-09	Rapparees	Wexford Park
	G Buggy 0-4 (3f, 1 65); B Redmond 0-4; B Goff 0-3; D Caulfield, N Sheil 0-1 each.		O O'Connor 0-4 (4f); T Mahon 0-2; D Ruth, E Furlong, T Boland (0-1 each).
