= 1979 Wexford Senior Hurling Championship =

Annual hurling competition season

- Champions: Rathnure (11th title)
- Runners-up: Faythe Harriers

The 1979 Wexford Senior Hurling Championship was the 69th staging of the Wexford Senior Hurling Championship since its establishment by the Wexford County Board in 1889.

Rapparees entered the championship as the defending champions.

The final went to two replays, culminating on 18 November 1979 at Bellefield Road, between Rathnure and Faythe Harriers, in what was their first meeting in a final in 14 years. Rathnure won the match by 0–09 to 0–08 to claim their 11th championship title overall and their first title in two years.

== Results ==
=== Finals ===
7 October 1979 Final	Faythe Harriers	2-12 - 3-09	Rathnure	Bellefield Road

11 November 1979 Final replay	Faythe Harriers	2-08 - 1-11	Rathnure	Bellefield Road

18 November 1979 Final second replay	Faythe Harriers	0-08 - 0-09	Rathnure	Bellefield Road
