= 2006 Wexford Senior Hurling Championship =

Annual hurling competition season

- Sponsor: Pettitt's SuperValu
- Champions: Rathnure (20th title); Martin Byrne (captain); Teddy O'Connor (manager)
- Runners-up: Oulart–The Ballagh

The 2006 Wexford Senior Hurling Championship was the 96th completed staging of the Wexford Senior Hurling Championship since its establishment by the Wexford County Board in 1889.

Oulart–The Ballagh entered the championship as the defending champions.

The final, a replay, was played on 21 October 2006 at Wexford Park, between Rathnure and Oulart–The Ballagh, in what was their third meeting in the final overall and a first meeting in the final in two years. Rathnure won the match by 1-12 to 0-06 to claim their 20th championship title overall and a first title in three yeats. It remains their last title success.

== Results ==
=== Final ===
15 October 2006 Final	Rathnure	0-16 - 1-13	Oulart–The Ballagh	Wexford Park
	M Jacob 1-6 (1-5f), R Jacob 0-3, D Mythen 0-2, D Redmond, D Nolan 0-1 each.	Report	P Codd 0-9 (5f), R Codd 0-3, N Higgins 0-2, S O'Neill, T Hogan 0-1 each.

=== Final replay ===
21 October 2006 Final replay	Rathnure	1-12 - 0-06	Oulart–The Ballagh	Wexford Park
	P Codd 0-5 (3f, 1 65), R Codd 1-2, N Higgins, T Hogan 0-2 each; M Redmond 0-1.	Report	M Jacob 0-5f, D Mythen 0-1.
