= 1992 Wexford Senior Hurling Championship =

Annual hurling competition season

- Champions: Buffers Alley (12th title)
- Runners-up: Oulart–the Ballagh

The 1992 Wexford Senior Hurling Championship was the 82nd completed staging of the Wexford Senior Hurling Championship since its establishment by the Wexford County Board in 1889.

Buffers Alley entered the championship as the defending champions.

The final, was played on 25 October 1992 at Wexford Park, between Buffers Alley and Oulart–the Ballagh, in what was their fourth meeting in the final overall and a first meeting in three years. Buffers Alley won the match by 1–11 to 1–05 to claim their 12th championship title overall and a second title in succession.

== Results ==
=== Final ===
25 October 1992 Final	Buffers Alley	1-11 - 1-05	Oulart–the Ballagh	Wexford Park
	T Dempsey 0-5, S Whelan 1-1, S O'Leary 0-2, M Foley 0-1, T Gahan 0-1, C Whelan 0-1.		B O'Connor 1-3, L Dunne 0-2.
