= 2009 Wexford Senior Hurling Championship =

Annual hurling competition season

- Sponsor: Pettitt's SuperValu
- Champions: Oulart–The Ballagh (7th title); Paul Roche (captain); Liam Dunne (manager)
- Runners-up: Buffers Alley

The 2009 Wexford Senior Hurling Championship was the 99th completed staging of the Wexford Senior Hurling Championship since its establishment by the Wexford County Board in 1889.

St Martin's entered the championship as the defending champions.

The final was played on 11 October 2009 at Wexford Park, between Oulart–The Ballagh and Buffers Alley, in what was their sixth meeting in the final overall and a first meeting in the final in two years. Oulart–The Ballagh won the match by 3-12 to 1-13 to claim their seventh championship title overall and a first title in two years.

== Results ==
=== Final ===
11 October 2009 Final	Oulart–The Ballagh	3-12 - 1-13	Buffers Alley	Wexford Park
	N Kirwan 3-4, D Redmond 0-2, R Jacob 0-2, J Roche 0-2, D Nolan 0-1, G Sinnott 0-1.		P Doran 1-7, T O'Leary 0-4, S Óg Whelan 0-1, P Kenny 0-1.
