= 1966 Wexford Senior Hurling Championship =

Annual hurling competition season

- Champions: Geraldine O'Hanrahans (4th title)
- Runners-up: Enniscorthy Shamrocks

The 1966 Wexford Senior Hurling Championship was the 56th completed staging of the Wexford Senior Hurling Championship since its establishment by the Wexford County Board in 1889.

Faythe Harriers entered the championship as the defending champions.

The final, a replay, was played on 11 September 1966 at Wexford Park, between Geraldine O'Hanrahans and Enniscorthy Shamrocks. Geraldine O'Hanrahans won the match by 2–10 to 3–04 to claim their fourth championship title overall and a first title in 21 years.

== Results ==
=== Final ===
| 21 August 1966 Final | Geraldine O'Hanrahans | 3-14 - 3-14 | Enniscorthy Shamrocks | Wexford Park |

=== Final replay ===
| 11 September 1966 Final replay | Geraldine O'Hanrahans | 2-10 - 3-04 | Enniscorthy Shamrocks | Wexford Park |
