= 1963 Wexford Senior Hurling Championship =

Annual hurling competition season

- Champions: Oylegate–Glenbrien (1st title); Pat Nolan (captain)
- Runners-up: Horeswood

The 1963 Wexford Senior Hurling Championship was the 53rd completed staging of the Wexford Senior Hurling Championship since its establishment by the Wexford County Board in 1889.

Faythe Harriers entered the championship as the defending champions.

The final was played on 27 October 1963 at the Bellefield Grounds in Enniscorthy, between Oylegate–Glenbrien and Horeswood. Oylegate–Glenbrien won the match by 6–09 to 3–04 to claim their first ever championship title.

== Results ==
=== Final ===
27 October 1963 Final	Oylegate–Glenbrien	6-09 - 2-04	Horeswood	Bellefield Grounds
