= 1969 Wexford Senior Hurling Championship =

Annual hurling competition season

- Champions: Enniscorthy Shamrocks (2nd title)
- Runners-up: Ferns St Aidan's

The 1969 Wexford Senior Hurling Championship was the 59th completed staging of the Wexford Senior Hurling Championship since its establishment by the Wexford County Board in 1889.

Buffers Alley entered the championship as the defending champions.

The final was played on 19 October 1969 at Bellefield Park in Enniscorthy, between Enniscorthy Shamrocks and Ferns St Aidan's. Enniscorthy Shamrocks won the match by 5–04 to 2–06 to claim their second championship title overall and a first title in five years.

== Results ==
=== Final ===
19 October 1969 Final	Enniscorthy Shamrocks	5-04 - 2-06	Ferns St Aidan's	Bellefield Park
