= Tom Neville (hurler) =

Irish hurler (1939–2018)

Personal information
- Native name: Tomás Ó Nia (Irish)
- Born: 1939 Fethard-on-Sea, County Wexford, Ireland
- Died: 19 October 2018 (aged 79) Kilkenny, Ireland
- Height: 5 ft 11 in (180 cm)

Sport
- Sport: Hurling
- Position: Left corner-back
Club
- Years: Club
- Geraldine O'Hanrahan's
Club titles
- Wexford titles: 1
Inter-county
Years	County	Apps (scores)
1960-1972	Wexford	27 (0-00)
Inter-county titles
- Leinster titles: 5
- All-Irelands: 2
- NHL: 1
- All Stars: 0

Thomas Neville (1939 – 19 October 2018) was an Irish hurler who played as a right corner-back for the Wexford senior team.

== Biography ==
Born in Fethard-on-Sea, County Wexford, Neville first played competitive hurling in his youth. He made his senior debut for the Wexford senior team during the 1960 championship. Neville went on to play a key part for Wexford during a successful era for the county, and won two All-Ireland medals, five Leinster medals and one National Hurling League medal. He was an All-Ireland runner-up on three occasions.

As a member of the Leinster inter-provincial team on a number of occasions, Neville won three Railway Cup medals. At club level he won one championship medal with Geraldine O'Hanrahan's.

Throughout his career Neville made 27 championship appearances. His retirement came following Wexford's defeat by Kilkenny in the 1972 championship.

Neville is widely regarded as one of Wexford's greatest-ever players.

== Honours ==
=== Team ===
Geraldine O'Hanrahan's

- Wexford Senior Hurling Championship (1): 1966

Wexford

- All-Ireland Senior Hurling Championship (2): 1960, 1968
- Leinster Senior Hurling Championship (5): 1960, 1962, 1965, 1968, 1970
- National Hurling League (1): 1966-67

Leinster

- Railway Cup (3): 1964, 1965, 1967

Sporting positions
Preceded by Pat Nolan	Wexford Senior Hurling Captain; 1965	Succeeded by
