= 1982 Wexford Senior Hurling Championship =

Annual hurling competition season

- Champions: Buffers Alley (5th title)
- Runners-up: Oulart–the Ballagh

The 1982 Wexford Senior Hurling Championship was the 72nd completed staging of the Wexford Senior Hurling Championship since its establishment by the Wexford County Board in 1889.

Faythe Harriers entered the championship as the defending champions.

The final was played on 24 October 1982 at Wexford Park, between Buffers Alley and Oulart–the Ballagh, in what was their second meeting in the final overall. Buffers Alley won the match by 1–09 to 1–06 to claim their fifth championship title overall and a first title in six years.

== Results ==
=== Final ===
24 October 1982 Final	Buffers Alley	1-09 - 1-06	Oulart–the Ballagh	Wexford Park
