= 1997 Wexford Senior Hurling Championship =

Annual hurling competition season

- Champions: Oulart–The Ballagh (3rd title)
- Runners-up: Glynn–Barntown

The 1997 Wexford Senior Hurling Championship was the 87th completed staging of the Wexford Senior Hurling Championship since its establishment by the Wexford County Board in 1889.

Rathnure entered the championship as the defending champions.

The final was played on 19 October 1997 at O'Kennedy Park in New Ross, between Oulart–The Ballagh and Glynn–Barntown, in what was their second meeting in the final overall and a first meeting in the final in two years. Oulart–The Ballagh won the match by 2–11 to 0–14 to claim their third championship title overall and a third title in four years.

== Results ==
=== Final ===
19 October 1997 Final	Oulart–The Ballagh	2-11 - 0-14	Glynn–Barntown	O'Kennedy Park
	P Finn 1-4, S Dunne 1-1, P Redmond 0-2, L Dunne 0-2, M Storey 0-1, D O'Connor 0-1.		T Kehoe 0-5, PJ Carley 0-2, C Roche 0-2, G Ryan 0-2, B Kirwan 0-1, A Redmond 0-1, F Morrissey 0-1.
