= 2013 Wexford Senior Hurling Championship =

Annual hurling competition season

The 2013 Wexford Senior Hurling Championship was the 103rd staging of the Wexford Senior Hurling Championship since its establishment in 1889. The championship ended on 20 October 2013.

Oulart–The Ballagh were the reigning champions, and successfully defended their title following a 3–12 to 1–16 defeat of Ferns St Aidan's in the final.

== Results ==
=== Quarter-finals ===
7 September Quarter-final	Oulart–The Ballagh	1-14 - 1-13	Faythe Harriers	Bellefield
	R Jacob (0-6, 5 frees), C O'Leary (1-0), G Sinnott (0-3), S Murphy (0-2), A Kenny (0-1), E Moore (0-1), D Mythen (0-1).	Report	R Clarke (1-4, 1-0 penalty, 0-3 frees), J Berry (0-3), B Goff (0-3), P Farrell (0-2), B O'Brien (0-1).	Referee: D O'Leary (Rathnure)

7 September Quarter-final	Ferns St Aidan's	2-22 - 3-12	Rathnure	Bellefield

7 September Quarter-final	Shelmaliers	0-22 - 0-20	St Anne's	Wexford Park

7 September Quarter-final	Glynn–Barntown	1-16 - 0-12	Rapparees	Wexford Park

=== Semi-finals ===
6 October Semi-final	Ferns St Aidan's	2-12 - 1-10	Glynn–Barntown	Wexford Park
	T Dwyer 1-2 frees; P Morris 1-0; I Byrne 0-6; J Breen 0-3, J Dwyer 0-1.	Report	M Fanning 1-0 pen; P Carley (0-4, 0-3 frees; C Doyle, G Moore 0-2 each; J Lacey, M Flood 0-1 each.	Referee: J Heffernan (Blackwater)

6 October Semi-final	Oulart–The Ballagh	0-17 - 0-10	Shelmaliers	Wexford Park
	N Kirwan 0-4, 2f, 1, ‘65’; D Nolan 0-3; M Jacob, D Mythen, R Jacob 0-2 each; G Sinnott, C O’Leary, S Murphy (f), D Redmond 0-1 each.	Report	C Byrne (0-7, 6 frees); B Malone, C O’Shaughnessy, J Kelly 0-1 each.	Referee: J Carton (Monageer–Boolavogue)

=== Final ===
20 October Final	Oulart–The Ballagh	3-12 - 1-16	Ferns St Aidan's	Wexford Park
	N Kirwan (2-3, 0-2 frees), R Jacob (1-2), D Redmond (0-3), M Jacob, G Sinnott, D Nolan, D Mythen (0-1 each).	Report	P Morris (1-3), T Dwyer (4fs), J Dwyer (2 sideline) (0-4 each), I Byrne (0-3), B Jordan, J Breen (0-1 each).	Referee: S Whelan (St Martin's)

== Championship statistics ==
=== Miscellaneous ===
- Oulart–The Ballagh made history by claiming a record-breaking fifth successive championship.
