= 1962 Wexford Senior Hurling Championship =

Annual hurling competition season

- Champions: Faythe Harriers (2nd title)
- Runners-up: Geraldine O'Hanrahans

The 1962 Wexford Senior Hurling Championship was the 52nd completed staging of the Wexford Senior Hurling Championship since its establishment by the Wexford County Board in 1889.

Rathnure entered the championship as the defending champions.

The final was played on 4 November 1962 at St Patrick's Park in Enniscorthy, between Faythe Harriers and Geraldine O'Hanrahans. Faythe Harriers won the match by 4–11 to 1–04 to claim their second championship title overall and a first title in two years.

== Results ==
=== Final ===
4 November 1962 Final	Faythe Harriers	4-11 - 1-04	Geraldine O'Hanrahans	St Patrick's Park
