= 1978 Wexford Senior Hurling Championship =

Annual hurling competition season

- Dates: 22 April - 17 September 1978
- Champions: Rapparees (1st title)
- Runners-up: Rathnure

The 1978 Wexford Senior Hurling Championship was the 68th staging of the Wexford Senior Hurling Championship since its establishment by the Wexford County Board in 1889. The championship began on 22 April 1978 and ended on 17 September 1978.

Rathnure entered the championship as the defending champions.

The final was played on 17 September 1978 at Wexford Park, between Rapparees and Rathnure, in what was their first meeting in a final in six years. Rapparees won the match by 0–16 to 2–07 to claim their first ever championship title.

== Results ==
=== Semi-finals ===
13 August 1978 Semi-final	Rathnure	3-11 - 3-07	Cloughbawn	O'Kennedy Park

20 August 1978 Semi-final	Rapparees	2-16 - 3-12	Buffers Alley	Wexford Park

=== Final ===
17 September 1978 Final	Rapparees	0-16 - 2-07	Rathnure	Wexford Park
	M Maher 0-8, H Goff 0-6, T Wildes 0-1, P Courtney 0-1.		J Higgins 1-1, P Codd 1-1, J Quigley 0-4, J Murphy 0-1.
