= 2015 Wexford Senior Hurling Championship =

Annual hurling competition season

- Champions: Oulart–The Ballagh (12th title); Barry Kehoe (captain)
- Runners-up: St Martin's; Ciarán Lyng (captain)

The 2015 Wexford Senior Hurling Championship was the 105th staging of the Wexford Senior Hurling Championship since its establishment by the Wexford County Board in 1889.

Shelmaliers were the defending champions.

The final was played on 25 October 2015 at Innovate Wexford Park in Wexford, between Oulart–The Ballagh and St Martin's, in what was their fifth meeting in the final overall and a first final meeting in five years. Oulart–The Ballagh won the match by 2–15 to 0–13 to claim their 12th championship title overall and a first tile in two years.

== Knockout stage ==
=== Final ===
25 October 2015 Final	Oulart–The Ballagh	2-15 - 0-13	St Martin's	Innovate Wexford Park
	N Kirwan 1-5 (3f, 1 '65), G Sinnott 1-2, D Mythen 0-3, P Sutton 0-2, D Redmond, R Jacob, M Og Storey 0-1 each.	Report	C Lyng 0-5 (1 f), P Kelly 0-3 (3f), S Murphy, J O'Connor 0-2 each, H O'Connor 0-1.	Referee: P Kehoe (Rathgarogue/Cushinstown)
