= 1975 Wexford Senior Hurling Championship =

Annual hurling competition season

- Champions: Buffers Alley (3rd title)
- Runners-up: Oulart–the Ballagh

The 1975 Wexford Senior Hurling Championship was the 65th completed staging of the Wexford Senior Hurling Championship since its establishment by the Wexford County Board in 1889.

Rathnure entered the championship as the defending champions.

The final was played on 14 September 1975 at Wexford Park, between Buffers Alley and Oulart–the Ballagh, in what was their first ever meeting in the final. Buffers Alley won the match by 3–10 to 2–07 to claim their third championship title overall and a first title in five years.

== Results ==
=== Final ===
| 14 September 1975 Final | Buffers Alley | 3-10 - 2-07 | Oulart–the Ballagh | Wexford Park |
