= 1981 Wexford Senior Hurling Championship =

Annual hurling competition season

- Champions: Faythe Harriers (4th title)
- Runners-up: Buffers Alley

The 1981 Wexford Senior Hurling Championship was the 71st completed staging of the Wexford Senior Hurling Championship since its establishment by the Wexford County Board in 1889.

Rathnure entered the championship as the defending champions.

The final was played on 25 October 1981 at Wexford Park, between Faythe Harriers and Buffers Alley, in what was their second meeting in the final overall. Faythe Harriers won the match by 2–10 to 2–09 to claim their fourth championship title overall and a first title in 16 years.

== Results ==
=== Final ===
25 October 1981 Final	Faythe Harriers	2-10 - 2-09	Buffers Alley	Wexford Park
