= Pat Herbert =

Irish hurler

Personal information
- Native name: Padraig Hoireabard (Irish)
- Born: 1946 (age 79–80) Castleconnell, County Limerick, Ireland
- Occupation: Retired army officer
- Height: 5 ft 11 in (180 cm)

Sport
- Sport: Hurling
- Position: Left corner-back
Club
- Years: Club
- Ahane
Club titles
- Limerick titles: 0
Inter-county*
Years	County	Apps (scores)
1977-1986	Limerick	16 (0-00)
Inter-county titles
- Munster titles: 1
- All-Irelands: 0
- NHL: 2
- All Stars: 0
- *Inter County team apps and scores correct as of 17:58, 1 June 2015.

Patrick "Pat" Herbert (born 1953) is an Irish retired hurler who played as a left corner-back for the Limerick senior team.

Herbert was born in Castleconnell, County Limerick. His senior debut came during the 1977 championship. Herbert immediately became a regular member of the starting fifteen and won one Munster medal and two National Hurling League medals. He was an All-Ireland runner-up on one occasion.

As a member of the Munster inter-provincial team on a number of occasions, Herbert won two Railway Cup medals. At club level he enjoyed a lengthy career with Ahane.

He made 16 championship appearances during his career, and retired following the conclusion of the 1986 championship.

Following his retirement from active playing, he turned to management and coaching. He guided Toomevara and Oulart the Ballagh to championship successes in their respective counties.

== Honours ==
=== Player ===
Limerick

- Munster Senior Hurling Championship (2): 1980 (sub), 1981
- National Hurling League (2): 1983-84, 1984-85

Munster

- Railway Cup (2): 1984, 1985

=== Manager ===
Toomevara

- Tipperary Senior Hurling Championship (1): 2006

Oulart the Ballagh

- Wexford Senior Hurling Championship (1): 2012
