= 2016 Wexford Senior Hurling Championship =

Annual hurling competition season

- Champions: Oulart–The Ballagh (13th title); Garrett Sinnott (captain)
- Runners-up: Cloughbawn; Alan Carton (captain)

The 2016 Wexford Senior Hurling Championship was the 106th staging of the Wexford Senior Hurling Championship since its establishment by the Wexford County Board in 1889.

Oulart–The Ballagh were the defending champions.

The final was played on 16 October 2016 at Innovate Wexford Park in Wexford, between Oulart–The Ballagh and Cloughbawn, in what was their first ever meeting in the final. Oulart–The Ballagh won the match by 0–17 to 1–11 to claim their 13th championship title overall and a second consecutive title.

== Knockout stage ==
=== Final ===
16 October 2016 Final	Oulart–The Ballagh	0-17 - 1-11	Cloughbawn	Innovate Wexford Park
	R Jacob 0-6 (5fs), N Kirwan 0-4fs, D Mythen 02, D Redmond, E Moore, T Storey, P Murphy, G Sinnott 0-1 each.	Report	H Kehoe 0-6 (3fs, 1 65), M Kehoe 1-0, R Whitty, C Flood 0-2, A Carton 0-1.	Referee: J Heffernan (Blackwater)
