= 2000 Wexford Senior Hurling Championship =

Annual hurling competition season

- Champions: St Anne's (2nd title)
- Runners-up: Oulart–The Ballagh

The 2000 Wexford Senior Hurling Championship was the 90th completed staging of the Wexford Senior Hurling Championship since its establishment by the Wexford County Board in 1889.

St Martin's entered the championship as the defending champions.

The final was played on 15 October 2000 at St Patrick's Park in Enniscorthy, between St Anne's and Oulart–The Ballagh, in what was their first ever meeting in the final. St Anne's won the match by 2–12 to 2–10 to claim their second championship title overall and a first title in 76 years. This victory was the second part of a double, as St Anne's had earlier won the Wexford SFC title.

== Results ==
=== Final ===
15 October 2000 Final	St Anne's	2-12 - 2-10	Oulart–The Ballagh	St Patrick's Park
	R Barry 0-8 (5f, 1 '65), J Berry 0-3 (2f), D Berry, F Simpson 1-0 each, D O'Connor 0-1.		S Dunne 1-1, P Finn 1-1, M Jacob 0-4 (2 '65s), P Redmond 0-2, M Storey, T Dunne 0-1 each.
