= 2007 Wexford Senior Hurling Championship =

Annual hurling competition season

- Sponsor: Pettitt's SuperValu
- Champions: Oulart–The Ballagh (6th title)
- Runners-up: Buffers Alley

The 2007 Wexford Senior Hurling Championship was the 97th completed staging of the Wexford Senior Hurling Championship since its establishment by the Wexford County Board in 1889.

Rathnure entered the championship as the defending champions.

The final was played on 21 October 2007 at Wexford Park, between Oulart–The Ballagh and Buffers Alley, in what was their fifth meeting in the final overall and a first meeting in the final in 15 years. Oulart–The Ballagh won the match by 4-14 to 2-06 to claim their sixth championship title overall and a first title in two years.

== Results ==
=== Final ===
21 October 2007 Final	Oulart–The Ballagh	4-14 - 2-06	Buffers Alley	Wexford Park
	R Jacob 0-7; D Mythen 2-0; N Kirwan 1-2 (2f); S Doyle 1-0; M Jacob, D Nolan 0-2 each; P Redmond 0-1.		W Doran 1-2; P Doyle 1-0; C Kenny 0-2 (1 65, 1f); P Doran (f), S Grannell 0-1 each.
