= 1983 Wexford Senior Hurling Championship =

Annual hurling competition season

- Champions: Buffers Alley (6th title)
- Runners-up: St Martin's

The 1983 Wexford Senior Hurling Championship was the 73rd completed staging of the Wexford Senior Hurling Championship since its establishment by the Wexford County Board in 1889.

Buffers Alley entered the championship as the defending champions.

The final was played on 25 September 1983 at Wexford Park, between Buffers Alley and St Martin's, in what was their first ever meeting in the final. Buffers Alley won the match by 1–13 to 1–01 to claim their sixth championship title overall and a second consecutive title.

== Results ==
=== Final ===
25 September 1983 Final	Buffers Alley	1-13 - 1-01	Oulart–the Ballagh	Wexford Park
