= 1988 Wexford Senior Hurling Championship =

Annual hurling competition season

- Champions: Buffers Alley (9th title)
- Runners-up: Rathnure

The 1988 Wexford Senior Hurling Championship was the 78th completed staging of the Wexford Senior Hurling Championship since its establishment by the Wexford County Board in 1889.

Rathnure entered the championship as the defending champions.

The final, a replay, was played on 23 October 1988 at Wexford Park, between Buffers Alley and Rathnure, in what was their sixth meeting in the final overall and a first meeting in three years. Buffers Alley won the match by 2–10 to 1–05 to claim their ninth championship title overall and a first title in three years.

== Results ==
=== Final ===
16 October 1988 Final	Buffers Alley	3-11 - 2-14	Rathnure	Wexford Park
	M Butler 1-3, P Donoghue 1-0, T Doran 1-0, T Dempsey 0-3, P Gahan 0-2, M Casey 0-1, S Whelan 0-1, F O'Leary 0-1.		M Morrissey 1-3, J Murphy 1-2, J Holohan 0-4, J Codd 0-2, V Reddy 0-1, N Hearne 0-1, J Redmond 0-1.

=== Final replay ===
23 October 1988 Final replay	Buffers Alley	2-10 - 1-05	Rathnure	Wexford Park
	T Doran 1-2, M Butler 0-4, S O'Leary 1-0, S Whelan 0-1, T Dempsey 0-1, M Casey 0-1, P Donoghue 0-1.		M Morrissey 1-1, J Murphy 0-2, J O'Connell 0-1, J Holohan 0-1.
