= 2008 Wexford Senior Hurling Championship =

Annual hurling competition season

- Sponsor: Pettitt's SuperValu
- Champions: St Martin's (2nd title); Daithí Hayes (captain); Roy Coleman (manager)
- Runners-up: Oulart–The Ballagh

The 2008 Wexford Senior Hurling Championship was the 98th completed staging of the Wexford Senior Hurling Championship since its establishment by the Wexford County Board in 1889.

Oulart–The Ballagh entered the championship as the defending champions.

The final was played on 2 November 2008 at Wexford Park, between St Martin's and Oulart–The Ballagh, in what was their third meeting in the final overall and a first meeting in the final in three years. St Martin's won the match by 1-13 to 1-08 to claim their second championship title overall and a first title in nine years.

== Results ==
=== Final ===
2 November 2008 Final	St Martin's	1-13 - 1-08	Oulart–The Ballagh	Wexford Park
	D Lyng 0-8, P Murphy 1-0, E Quigley 0-2, C Lyng 0-1, B Lambert 0-1, J Coleman 0-1.		R Jacob 1-2, N Kirwan 0-5, M Jacob 0-1.
