= 1964 Wexford Senior Hurling Championship =

Annual hurling competition season

- Champions: Enniscorthy Shamrocks (1st title)
- Runners-up: Faythe Harriers

The 1964 Wexford Senior Hurling Championship was the 54th completed staging of the Wexford Senior Hurling Championship since its establishment by the Wexford County Board in 1889.

Oylegate–Glenbrien entered the championship as the defending champions.

The final was played on 18 October 1964 at the O'Kennedy Park in New Ross, between Enniscorthy Shamrocks and Faythe Harriers. Enniscorthy Shamrocks won the match by 1–13 to 2–09 to claim their first ever championship title.

== Results ==
=== Final ===
18 October 1964 Final	Enniscorthy Shamrocks	1-13 - 2-09	Faythe Harriers	O'Kennedy Park
