= 1965 Wexford Senior Hurling Championship =

Annual hurling competition season

- Champions: Faythe Harriers (3rd title)
- Runners-up: Rathnure

The 1965 Wexford Senior Hurling Championship was the 55th completed staging of the Wexford Senior Hurling Championship since its establishment by the Wexford County Board in 1889.

Enniscorthy Shamrocks entered the championship as the defending champions.

The final, a replay, was played on 14 November 1965 at the Gorey Grounds, between Faythe Harriers and Rathnure. Faythe Harriers won the match by 4–08 to 4–06 to claim their third championship title overall and a first title in three years.

== Results ==
=== Final ===
31 October 1965 Final	Faythe Harriers	3-08 - 2-11	Rathnure	Bellefield Grounds

=== Final replay ===
14 November 1965 Final replay	Faythe Harriers	4-08 - 4-06	Rathnure	Gorey Grounds
