= 2004 Wexford Senior Hurling Championship =

Annual hurling competition season

- Sponsor: Pettitt's SuperValu
- Champions: Oulart–The Ballagh (4th title)
- Runners-up: Rathnure

The 2004 Wexford Senior Hurling Championship was the 94th completed staging of the Wexford Senior Hurling Championship since its establishment by the Wexford County Board in 1889.

Rathnure entered the championship as the defending champions.

The final was played on 17 October 2004 at Wexford Park, between Oulart–The Ballagh and Rathnure, in what was their second meeting in the final overall and a first meeting in the final in 30 years. Oulart–The Ballagh won the match by 1-17 to 1-10 to claim their fourth championship title overall and a first title in seven years.

== Results ==
=== Final ===
18 October 2004 Final	Oulart–The Ballagh	3-09 - 1-13	Rathnure	Wexford Park
	M Jacob 0-7 (6f), P Finn 1-2, D Mythen 0-3, R Jacob 0-2, M Storey 0-2, S Doyle 0-1.		P Codd 0-8 (7f 1 '65'), R Codd 1-0, N Higgins 0-2.
