= 1984 Wexford Senior Hurling Championship =

Annual hurling competition season

- Champions: Buffers Alley (7th title)
- Runners-up: Faythe Harriers

The 1984 Wexford Senior Hurling Championship was the 74th completed staging of the Wexford Senior Hurling Championship since its establishment by the Wexford County Board in 1889.

Buffers Alley entered the championship as the defending champions.

The final, a replay, was played on 21 October 1984 at Wexford Park, between Buffers Alley and Faythe Harriers, in what was their third meeting in the final overall. Buffers Alley won the match by 2–05 to 0–05 to claim their seventh championship title overall and a third consecutive title.

== Results ==
=== Final ===
14 October 1984 Final	Buffers Alley	0-12 - 1-09	Faythe Harriers	Wexford Park

=== Final replay ===
21 October 1984 Final replay	Buffers Alley	2-05 - 0-05	Faythe Harriers	Wexford Park
