= 1972 Wexford Senior Hurling Championship =

Annual hurling competition season

- Champions: Rathnure (7th title)
- Runners-up: Rapparees

The 1972 Wexford Senior Hurling Championship was the 62nd completed staging of the Wexford Senior Hurling Championship since its establishment by the Wexford County Board in 1889.

Rathnure entered the championship as the defending champions.

The final was played on 8 October 1972 at O'Kennedy Park in New Ross, between Rathnure and Rapparees, in what was their first ever meeting in the final. Rathnure won the match by 1–17 to 1–08 to claim their seventh championship title overall and a second title in succession.

== Results ==
=== Final ===
| 9 October 1972 Final | Rathnure | 1-17 - 1-08 | Rapparees | O'Kennedy Park |
| | D Quigley 0-12, J Higgins 1-0, J Quigley 0-2, P Flynn 0-1, J Murphy 0-1, M Quigley 0-1. | | C Kehoe 1-2, D Fortune 0-2, P Lynch 0-2, P Sinnott 0-1, J O'Connor 0-1. | Referee: M O'Neill (Adamstown) |
