= 2003 Wexford Senior Hurling Championship =

Annual hurling competition season

- Sponsor: Pettitt's SuperValu
- Champions: Rathnure (18th title); Rod Guiney (captain)
- Runners-up: Glynn–Barntown

The 2003 Wexford Senior Hurling Championship was the 93rd completed staging of the Wexford Senior Hurling Championship since its establishment by the Wexford County Board in 1889.

Rathnure entered the championship as the defending champions.

The final was played on 19 October 2003 at Wexford Park, between Rathnure and Glynn–Barntown, in what was their first ever meeting in the final. Rathnure won the match by 3-09 to 1-13 to claim their 19th championship title overall and a second title in succession.

== Results ==
=== Final ===
19 October 2003 Final	Rathnure	3-09 - 1-13	Glynn–Barntown	Wexford Park
	T Hogan 2-0, P Codd 0-6, R Codd 1-1, M O'Leary 0-1, J O'Connor 0-1.		P Carley 0-11, PJ Carley 1-1, D Leonard 0-1.
