= Stephen Nolan (hurler) =

Irish hurler

Personal information
- Native name: Stiofáin Ó Nualáin (Irish)
- Born: Wexford, Ireland

Sport
- Sport: Hurling
Club
- Years: Club
- Faythe Harriers
Inter-county
- Years: County
- ?-Present: Wexford
Inter-county titles
- All-Irelands: 0
- NHL: 1 (Div 2)
- All Stars: 0

Stephen Nolan is an Irish sportsperson. He plays hurling with his local club Faythe Harriers and also plays hurling for the Wexford senior team.
