= 1990 Wexford Senior Hurling Championship =

Annual hurling competition season

- Champions: Rathnure (15th title)
- Runners-up: Cloughbawn

The 1990 Wexford Senior Hurling Championship was the 80th completed staging of the Wexford Senior Hurling Championship since its establishment by the Wexford County Board in 1889.

Buffers Alley entered the championship as the defending champions.

The final, was played on 14 October 1990 at Wexford Park, between Rathnure and Cloughbawn, in what was their third meeting in the final overall and a first meeting in three years. Rathnure won the match by 2–08 to 1–08 to claim their 15th championship title overall and a first title in three years.

== Results ==
=== Final ===
14 October 1990 Final	Rathnure	2-08 - 1-08	Cloughbawn	Wexford Park
	M Morrissey 1-1, J Holohan 0-4, M Quigley 1-0, A Codd 0-3.		S Wickham 0-5, D Doyle 1-0, J Fleming 0-2, L Murphy 0-1.	Referee: T Kirwan
