= 1968 Wexford Senior Hurling Championship =

Annual hurling competition season

- Champions: Buffers Alley (1st title)
- Runners-up: Faythe Harriers

The 1968 Wexford Senior Hurling Championship was the 58th completed staging of the Wexford Senior Hurling Championship since its establishment by the Wexford County Board in 1889.

Rathnure entered the championship as the defending champions.

The final was played on 8 December 1968 at St Patrick's Park in Enniscorthy, between Buffers Alley and Faythe Harriers, in what was their first ever meeting in the final. Buffers Alley won the match by 4–08 to 5–03 to claim their first ever championship title.

== Results ==
=== Final ===
8 December 1968 Final	Buffers Alley	4-08 - 5-03	Faythe Harriers	St Patrick's Park
