= 1987 Wexford Senior Hurling Championship =

Annual hurling competition season

- Champions: Rathnure (14th title)
- Runners-up: Cloughbawn

The 1987 Wexford Senior Hurling Championship was the 77th completed staging of the Wexford Senior Hurling Championship since its establishment by the Wexford County Board in 1889.

Rathnure entered the championship as the defending champions.

The final was played on 11 October 1987 at Wexford Park, between Rathnure and Cloughbawn, in what was their second meeting in the final overall and a first meeting in 38 years. Rathnure won the match by 2–06 to 0–09 to claim their 14th championship title overall and a second title in succession.

== Results ==
=== Final ===
11 October 1987 Final	Rathnure	2-06 - 0-09	Cloughbawn	Wexford Park
	M Morrissey 2-0, J Houlihan 0-3, J Murphy 0-2, N Hearne 0-1.		S Wickham 0-4, J Fleming 0-3, P Carton 0-1, N Byrne 0-1.
