= Paul Roche (hurler) =

Irish hurler

Personal information
- Native name: Pól Róistigh (Irish)
- Born: 1 February 1982 (age 44) Oulart, County Wexford

Sport
- Sport: Hurling
- Position: Right Corner Back
Club
- Years: Club
- Oulart–The Ballagh
Inter-county
- Years: County
- 2005-2013: Wexford
Inter-county titles
- NHL: 1 (Div 2)

Paul Roche (born 1 February 1982 in Oulart, County Wexford) is an Irish sportsperson. He plays hurling with his club Oulart–The Ballagh and was a member of the Wexford senior inter-county team from 2005 to 2013. Roche was known as one of the best full-backs for Wexford.

== Playing career ==
=== Club ===
Roche plays his club hurling with the best-known Oulart–The Ballagh club in Wexford and has overall been a success. He joined in early 2003 while still playing the Under-21 squad and still is currently playing with no awards.

=== Inter-county ===
Roche first made his senior debut against Kilkenny in the 2005 Leinster final. That year it wasn't the greatest success for Wexford as they were narrowly defeated by Kilkenny. It was Roche's first ever appearance in a Leinster before getting trounced by Clare in the All Ireland Quarter Final.
