= 1989 Wexford Senior Hurling Championship =

Annual hurling competition season

- Champions: Buffers Alley (10th title)
- Runners-up: Oulart–the Ballagh

The 1989 Wexford Senior Hurling Championship was the 79th completed staging of the Wexford Senior Hurling Championship since its establishment by the Wexford County Board in 1889.

Buffers Alley entered the championship as the defending champions.

The final, was played on 24 September 1989 at Wexford Park, between Buffers Alley and Oulart–the Ballagh, in what was their third meeting in the final overall and a first meeting in seven years. Buffers Alley won the match by 3–16 to 2–13 to claim their 10th championship title overall and a second title in succession.

== Results ==
=== Final ===
24 September 1989 Final	Buffers Alley	3-16 - 2-13 (aet)	Oulart–the Ballagh	Wexford Park
	M Butler 2-6, S Whelan 0-4, P Lacey 1-0, T Dempsey 0-2, S Casey 0-2, T Doran 0-1, J Gahan 0-1.		B O'Connor 1-4, S Dunne 1-4, M Redmond 0-2, T Dunne 0-1, M Storey 0-1, L Dunne 0-1.	Referee: D Murphy (Enniscorthy)
