= 1971 Wexford Senior Hurling Championship =

Annual hurling competition season

- Champions: Rathnure (6th title)
- Runners-up: Enniscorthy District

The 1971 Wexford Senior Hurling Championship was the 61st completed staging of the Wexford Senior Hurling Championship since its establishment by the Wexford County Board in 1889.

Buffers Alley entered the championship as the defending champions.

The final was played on 19 September 1971 at St Patrick's Park in Enniscorthy, between Rathnure and Enniscorthy District, in what was their first ever meeting in the final. Rathnure won the match by 4–09 to 3–08 to claim their sixth championship title overall and a first title in four years.

== Results ==
=== Final ===
19 September 1971 Final	Rathnure	4-09 - 3-08	Enniscorthy District	St Patrick's Park
