= 1995 Wexford Senior Hurling Championship =

Annual hurling competition season

- Champions: Oulart–The Ballagh (2nd title)
- Runners-up: Glynn–Barntown

The 1995 Wexford Senior Hurling Championship was the 85th completed staging of the Wexford Senior Hurling Championship since its establishment by the Wexford County Board in 1889.

Oulart–The Ballagh entered the championship as the defending champions.

The final was played on 24 September 1995 at Wexford Park, between Oulart–The Ballagh and Glynn–Barntown, in what was their first ever meeting in the final. Oulart–The Ballagh won the match by 2–15 to 2–09 to claim their second championship title overall and a second successive title.

== Results ==
=== Final ===
24 September 1995 Final	Oulart–The Ballagh	2-15 - 2-09	Glynn–Barntown	Wexford Park
	S Dunne 2-6, M Storey 0-5, D O'Connor 0-3, P Redmond 0-1.		T Kehoe 0-7, S Stafford 1-0, G Laffan 1-0, E Furlong 0-1, PJ Carley 0-1.
