= 1961 Wexford Senior Hurling Championship =

Annual hurling competition season

- Champions: Rathnure (4th title)
- Runners-up: St Aidan's Enniscorthy

The 1961 Wexford Senior Hurling Championship was the 51st completed staging of the Wexford Senior Hurling Championship since its establishment by the Wexford County Board in 1889.

Faythe Harriers entered the championship as the defending champions.

The final was played on 12 November 1961 at the Gorey Grounds, between Rathnure and St Aidan's Enniscorthy. Rathnure won the match by 3–10 to 1–04 to claim their fourth championship title overall and a first title in six years.

== Results ==
=== Final ===
12 November 1961 Final	Rathnure	3-10 - 1-04	St Aidan's Enniscorthy	St Patrick's Park
