= 2010 Wexford Senior Hurling Championship =

Annual hurling competition season

- Sponsor: Pettitt's SuperValu
- Champions: Oulart–The Ballagh (8th title); David Redmond (captain); Liam Dunne (manager)
- Runners-up: St Martin's

The 2010 Wexford Senior Hurling Championship was the 100th completed staging of the Wexford Senior Hurling Championship since its establishment by the Wexford County Board in 1889.

Oulart–The Ballagh entered the championship as the defending champions.

The final was played on 10 October 2010 at Wexford Park, between Oulart–The Ballagh and St Martin's, in what was their fourth meeting in the final overall and a first meeting in the final in two years. Oulart–The Ballagh won the match by 1-14 to 0-06 to claim their eighth championship title overall and a second title in succession.

== Results ==
=== Semi-finals ===
| 26 September 2010 Semi-final | Oulart–The Ballagh | 4-18 - 0-15 | Ferns St Aidan's | Wexford Park |
| | N Kirwan 1-7, R Jacob 1-3, G Sinnott 1-2, D Redmond 1-1, D Nolan 0-3, M Jacob 0-1, S Murphy 0-1. | | T Dwyer 0-6, J Dwyer 0-4, B Jordan 0-4, C O'Connor 0-1. |

| 26 September 2010 Semi-final | St Martin's | 0-16 - 1-12 | Buffers Alley | Wexford Park |
| | B Lambert 0-10, E Quigley 0-2, W Devereux 0-1, D Waters 0-1, P Kelly 0-1, M Maloney 0-1. | | K Burke 0-7, P Doran 1-1, T O'Leary 0-3, J Foley 0-1. |

=== Final ===
| 10 October 2010 Final | Oulart–The Ballagh | 1-14 - 0-06 | St Martin's | Wexford Park |
| | N Kirwan 0-4, G Sinnott 1-0, S Murphy 0-3, R Jacob 0-3, D Redmond 0-2, P Roche 0-1, S Doyle 0-1. | | B Lambert 0-3, T Waters 0-1, J Coleman 0-1, P Kelly 0-1. |
