= 1976 Wexford Senior Hurling Championship =

Annual hurling competition season

- Champions: Buffers Alley (4th title)
- Runners-up: Rapparees

The 1976 Wexford Senior Hurling Championship was the 66th completed staging of the Wexford Senior Hurling Championship since its establishment by the Wexford County Board in 1889.

Buffers Alley entered the championship as the defending champions.

The final was played on 7 November 1976 at Wexford Park, between Buffers Alley and Rapparees, in what was their first ever meeting in the final. Buffers Alley won the match by 1–11 to 2–04 to claim their fourth championship title overall and a second consecutive title.

== Results ==
=== Final ===
7 November 1976 Final	Buffers Alley	1-11 - 2-04	Rapparees	Wexford Park
