= 1985 Wexford Senior Hurling Championship =

Annual hurling competition season

- Champions: Buffers Alley (8th title)
- Runners-up: Faythe Harriers

The 1985 Wexford Senior Hurling Championship was the 75th completed staging of the Wexford Senior Hurling Championship since its establishment by the Wexford County Board in 1889.

Buffers Alley entered the championship as the defending champions.

The final was played on 29 September 1985 at Wexford Park, between Buffers Alley and Faythe Harriers, in what was their second consecutive meeting in the final. Buffers Alley won the match by 1–14 to 1–12 to claim their eighth championship title overall and a fourth consecutive title.

== Results ==
=== Final ===
29 September 1985 Final	Buffers Alley	1-14 - 1-12	Faythe Harriers	Wexford Park
