= 1970 Wexford Senior Hurling Championship =

Annual hurling competition season

- Dates: 19 April - 29 November 1970
- Champions: Buffers Alley (2nd title)
- Runners-up: Enniscorthy Shamrocks

The 1970 Wexford Senior Hurling Championship was the 60th completed staging of the Wexford Senior Hurling Championship since its establishment by the Wexford County Board in 1889. The championship ran from 19 April to 29 November 1970.

Enniscorthy Shamrocks entered the championship as the defending champions.

The final was played on 29 November 1970 at Wexford Park, between Buffers Alley and Enniscorthy Shamrocks, in what was their first ever meeting in the final. Buffers Alley won the match by 4–16 to 1–04 to claim their second championship title overall and a first title in two years.

== Results ==
=== Final ===
29 November 1970 Final	Buffers Alley	4-16 - 1-04	Enniscorthy Shamrocks	Wexford Park
