= Pat Nolan (hurler) =

Irish hurler (1937–2021)

Personal information
- Native name: Pádraig Ó Nualláin (Irish)
- Born: 9 July 1937 Glenbrien, County Wexford, Ireland
- Died: 29 August 2021 (aged 84) Glenbrien, County Wexford, Ireland
- Height: 5 ft 10 in (178 cm)

Sport
- Sport: Hurling
- Position: Goalkeeper
Club
- Years: Club
- Oylegate-Glenbrien
Club titles
- Wexford titles: 1
Inter-county*
Years	County	Apps (scores)
1956–1974	Wexford	36 (0–00)
Inter-county titles
- Leinster titles: 6
- All-Irelands: 3
- NHL: 3
- *Inter County team apps and scores correct as of 17:22, 27 December 2013.

Patrick Nolan (9 July 1937 – 29 August 2021) was an Irish hurler who played as a goalkeeper for the Wexford senior team.

Born in Oylegate, County Wexford, Nolan first played competitive hurling in his youth. He quickly came to prominence at underage levels with the Oylegate-Glenbrien club, before later winning championship medals in the junior and intermediate grades. Nolan was a one-time championship medal winner at senior level.

== Biography ==
Nolan arrived on the inter-county scene at the age of seventeen when he first linked up with the Wexford minor team. He joined the senior team as sub-goalkeeper for the 1956 championship. Nolan went on to play a key part for Wexford during a hugely successful era for the county, and won three All-Ireland medals, six Leinster medals and three National Hurling League medals. He was an All-Ireland runner-up on three occasions.

As a member of the Leinster inter-provincial team on a number of occasions, Nolan won four Railway Cup medals. Throughout his career he made 36 championship appearances. Nolan's retirement came following Wexford's defeat by Kilkenny in the 1974 championship.

Nolan is widely regarded as Wexford's greatest-ever goalkeeper.

Nolan died on 29 August 2021, aged 84.

== Playing career ==
=== Inter-county ===
Nolan first played for Wexford as a member of the minor hurling team in 1955. The following year he had impressed the selectors so much that he was in a position to challenge Art Foley for the goalkeeping position on the senior team. In the end, Nolan remained in the reserves that year as Wexford claimed the Leinster and All-Ireland titles following respective victories over Kilkenny and Cork.

Two years later in 1958 Nolan won a National Hurling League medal following a 5–7 to 4–8 defeat of Limerick.

Nolan won his first Leinster medal on the field of play in 1960 following a 3–10 to 2–11 defeat of reigning champions Kilkenny. This victory allowed Wexford to advance directly to an All-Ireland final meeting with Tipperary on 4 September 1960. A certain amount of over-confidence was obvious in the Tipperary camp, particularly in trainer Phil Purcell's comment that no player was capable of marking Jimmy Doyle. The game ended in remarkable circumstances as the crowd invaded the pitch with a minute to go, mistaking the referee's whistle for the end of the game. When the crowd were finally moved off the pitch Tipperary continued playing with only twelve men, but Wexford won on a score line of 2–15 to 0–11. It was Nolan's first All-Ireland victory on the field of play and his second winners' medal overall.

After surrendering their provincial and All-Ireland titles in 1961, Wexford bounced back the following year. A 3–9 to 2–10 defeat of Kilkenny gave Nolan his third Leinster medal. Tipperary were waiting in Croke Park to test Wexford once again in the subsequent All-Ireland final on 2 September 1962. Wexford, however, were not the force of old and the side got off to possibly the worst start ever by a team in a championship decider. After just ninety seconds the Leinster champions were down by two goals, however, the game turned out to be much closer than people expected. Tipperary eventually secured the win on a score line of 3–10 to 2–11.

In 1965 Nolan won his fourth Leinster medal as Kilkenny were narrowly defeated by 2–11 to 3–7. Tipperary were Wexford's opponents in the subsequent All-Ireland final on 5 September 1965, however, the game failed to live up to the two classic games between the two sides in 1960 and 1962. Victory went to Tipperary on that occasion by 2–16 to 0–10, courtesy of a brace of goals by Seán McLoughlin.

Nolan claimed his second National Hurling League medal in 1967 when a 3–10 to 1–9 defeat of Kilkenny gave him a second winners' medal.

Nolan won a fifth Leinster medal in 1968 following a 3–13 to 4–9 defeat of reigning provincial and All-Ireland champions Kilkenny. This victory allowed Wexford to advance to an All-Ireland final against Tipperary, the outstanding team of the decade, on 1 September 1968. All was going to plan for Tipperary as they took a 1–11 to 1–3 lead at half-time. In one of the great All-Ireland comebacks, Tony Doran got Wexford back on track with a goal six minutes after the interval. Three more goals followed from Paul Lynch, Jack Berry and Doran again. Late goals from Michael "Babs" Keating and Seán McLoughlin for Tipperary failed to stem the tide as Wexford secured a remarkable 5–8 to 3–12 victory. The victory gave Nolan his third All-Ireland medal.

After surrendering their championship titles in 1969, Wexford regrouped the following year. A 4–16 to 3–14 defeat of old rivals Kilkenny in the very first 80-minute championship game gave Nolan a sixth Leinster medal. Wexford subsequently faced Cork in the All-Ireland decider on 6 September 1970. A record 64-point scoreline and eleven goals were produced in a sometimes ill-tempered and disappointing contest. Tony Doran top scored for Wexford with two goals, however, the day belonged to Eddie O'Brien who scored a hat-trick of goals for Cork from his hand. A remarkable 6–21 to 5–10 score line gave Cork the victory.

Nolan won a third National Hurling League medal in 1973 following a 4–13 to 3–7 defeat of Limerick.

=== Inter-provincial ===
Nolan was first picked on the Leinster inter-provincial in 1964 as reserved goalkeeper to Ollie Walsh. He won his first Railway Cup medal as a non-playing substitute following a 3–7 to 2–9 defeat of Munster.

In 1965 Nolan was unable to oust Walsh as first-choice goalkeeper once again. Nevertheless, he won a second Railway Cup medal as a substitute following a 3–11 to 0–9 defeat of Munster once again.

Nolan remained off the team for a number of years before returning as the first-choice goalkeeper in 1971. Munster provided the opposition once again, however, a 2–17 to 2–12 victory gave Nolan his third Railway Cup medal.

In 1974 Nolan won his fourth Railway Cup medal, his third as a substitute, as Leinster defeated Munster by 2–15 to 1–13.

== Honours ==
Oylegate-Glenbrien

- Wexford Senior Hurling Championship: 1963 (c)
- Wexford Intermediate Hurling Championship: 1959
- Wexford Junior Hurling Championship: 1955

Wexford

- All-Ireland Senior Hurling Championship: 1956 (sub), 1960, 1968
- Leinster Senior Hurling Championship (6): 1956 (sub), 1960, 1962, 1965, 1968, 1970
- National Hurling League: 1957–58, 1966–67, 1972–73

Leinster

- Railway Cup: 1964 (sub), 1965 (sub), 1971, 1974 (sub)

Sporting positions
Preceded by	Wexford Senior Hurling Captain; 1964	Succeeded by Tom Neville
