= 1977 Wexford Senior Hurling Championship =

Annual hurling competition season

- Champions: Rathnure (10th title)
- Runners-up: Buffers Alley

The 1977 Wexford Senior Hurling Championship was the 67th completed staging of the Wexford Senior Hurling Championship since its establishment by the Wexford County Board in 1889.

Buffers Alley entered the championship as the defending champions.

The final was played on 23 October 1977 at Wexford Park, between Rathnure and Buffers Alley, in what was their third meeting in the final overall and a first meeting in four years. Rathnure won the match by 2–07 to 2–04 to claim their 10th championship title overall and a first title in three years.

== Results ==
=== Final ===
23 October 1977 Final	Rathnure	2-07 - 2-04	Buffers Alley	Wexford Park
	J Quigley 1-3, J Holohan 1-0, D O'Connor 0-3, M Murphy 0-1.		P Lacey 1-1, S O'Leary 1-0, M Butler 0-3.
