= 1960 Wexford Senior Hurling Championship =

Annual hurling competition season

- Champions: Faythe Harriers (1st title)
- Runners-up: Oylegate–Glenbrien

The 1960 Wexford Senior Hurling Championship was the 50th completed staging of the Wexford Senior Hurling Championship since its establishment by the Wexford County Board in 1889.

St Aidan's Enniscorthy entered the championship as the defending champions.

The final was played on 18 September 1960 at St Patrick's Park in Enniscorthy, between Faythe Harriers and Oylegate–Glenbrien. Faythe Harriers won the match by 5–10 to 2–05 to claim their first ever championship title.

== Results ==
=== Final ===
18 September 1960 Final	Faythe Harriers	5-10 - 2-05	Oylegate–Glenbrien	St Patrick's Park
