= 2005 Wexford Senior Hurling Championship =

Annual hurling competition season

- Sponsor: Pettitt's SuperValu
- Champions: Oulart–The Ballagh (5th title)
- Runners-up: St Martin's

The 2005 Wexford Senior Hurling Championship was the 95th completed staging of the Wexford Senior Hurling Championship since its establishment by the Wexford County Board in 1889.

Oulart–The Ballagh entered the championship as the defending champions.

The final was played on 23 October 2005 at Wexford Park, between Oulart–The Ballagh and St Martin's, in what was their second meeting in the final overall and a first meeting in the final in 11 years. Oulart–The Ballagh won the match by 1-15 to 1-09 to claim their fifth championship title overall and a second title in succession.

== Results ==
=== Final ===
23 October 2005 Final	Oulart–The Ballagh	1-15 - 1-09	St Martin's	Wexford Park
	S Doyle 0-8 (6f), D Mythen 1-1, R Jacob 0-3, L Prendergast, D Stamp, M Jacob 0-1 each.		B Lambert 0-5 (3f), R Quigley 1-2, E Quigley 0-1, R Lambert 0-1.
