= 1967 Wexford Senior Hurling Championship =

Annual hurling competition season

- Champions: Rathnure (5th title)
- Runners-up: Buffers Alley

The 1967 Wexford Senior Hurling Championship was the 57th completed staging of the Wexford Senior Hurling Championship since its establishment by the Wexford County Board in 1889.

Geraldine O'Hanrahans entered the championship as the defending champions, however, they were beaten by Kilmore-Rathangan in the first round.

The final was played on 10 September 1967 at St Patrick's Park in Enniscorthy, between Rathnure and Buffers Alley, in what was their first ever meeting in the final. Rathnure won the match by 4–13 to 1–04 to claim their fifth championship title overall and a first title in six years.

== Results ==
=== Final ===
10 September 1967 Final	Rathnure	4-13 - 1-04	Buffers Alley	St Patrick's Park
	S Barron 2-6, G O'Leary 2-2, P Quigley 0-3, J Quigley 0-1, M Byrne 0-1.		B Murphy 1-4.	Referee: F Morris (St Martin's)
