= 1973 Wexford Senior Hurling Championship =

Annual hurling competition season

- Champions: Rathnure (8th title)
- Runners-up: Buffers Alley

The 1973 Wexford Senior Hurling Championship was the 63rd completed staging of the Wexford Senior Hurling Championship since its establishment by the Wexford County Board in 1889.

Rathnure entered the championship as the defending champions.

The final was played on 18 November 1973 at St Patrick's Park in Enniscorthy, between Rathnure and Buffers Alley, in what was their second meeting in the final overall and a first meeting in six years. Rathnure won the match by 2–07 to 1–07 to claim their eighth championship title overall and a third title in succession.

== Results ==
=== Final ===
18 November 1973 Final	Rathnure	2-07 - 1-07	Buffers Alley	St Patrick's Park
	J Quigley 1-2, D Quigley 1-1, M Quigley 0-1, M Byrne 0-1, P Hanrick 0-1, J Murphy 0-1.		T Doran 1-2, B Murphy 0-4, C Doran 0-1.
