= Declan Ruth =

Irish hurler (born 1976)

Personal information
- Native name: Déaglán Rút (Irish)
- Nickname: Skippy
- Born: 30 April 1976 (age 50) Enniscorthy, County Wexford, Ireland
- Occupation: Account manager
- Height: 6 ft 2 in (188 cm)

Sport
- Sport: Hurling
- Position: Centre-back
Club
- Years: Club
- Rapparees Starlights
Club titles
	Football	Hurling
Wexford titles	2	0
College
- Years: College
- 1994-1998: Waterford Institute of Technology
College titles
- Fitzgibbon titles: 0
Inter-county
- Years: County
- 1995-2007: Wexford
Inter-county titles
- Leinster titles: 2
- All-Irelands: 1
- NHL: 0
- All Stars: 0

Declan Ruth (born 30 April 1976) is an Irish hurling manager and former player. He is the current manager of his hometown club Rathnure, having enjoyed a lengthy career with them as a player, while he also lined out with the Wexford senior hurling team. Ruth usually lined out as a defender.

== Playing career ==
Ruth first came to prominence at juvenile and underage levels as a dual player with the Shamrocks GAA club, before transferring to the Rapparees GAA club. He eventually progressed onto the club's top adult teams and won two County Championship titles as a Gaelic footballer. Ruth first appeared on the inter-county scene as a member of the Wexford minor team before later winning consecutive Leinster Under-21 Championship titles. He made his first appearance for the Wexford senior hurling team in an Oireachtas Cup game against Clare in November 1995. Ruth was a non-playing substitute on the Wexford team that beat Limerick in the 1996 All-Ireland final. He had earlier won a Leinster Championship medal as a non-playing substitute and, after being dropped from the team for a period, returned to win a second provincial title in 2004.

== Managerial career ==
Ruth has been involved in coaching and team management at all levels with the Rapparees club. In 2021 he managed the club's senior team to a first County Championship title in 43 years.

== Personal life ==
Ruth was educated at Enniscorthy CBS before later completing a Bachelor's degree in Business Studies and Accountancy at the Waterford Institute of Technology. He later worked as a sales rep for a number of medical companies and also spent some time as an analyst on RTÉ's the Sunday Game. In 2009, Ruth married Wexford camogie player Aoife O'Connor.

== Honours ==
=== Player ===
Starlights

- Wexford Senior Football Championship: 2002, 2004

Wexford

- All-Ireland Senior Hurling Championship: 1996
- Leinster Senior Hurling Championship: 1996, 2004
- Leinster Under-21 Hurling Championship: 1996, 1997

=== Manager ===
Rapparees

- Wexford Senior Hurling Championship: 2021
