= 1980 Wexford Senior Hurling Championship =

Annual hurling competition season

- Champions: Rathnure (12th title)
- Runners-up: Buffers Alley

The 1980 Wexford Senior Hurling Championship was the 70th staging of the Wexford Senior Hurling Championship since its establishment by the Wexford County Board in 1889.

Rathnure entered the championship as the defending champions.

The final was played on 14 September 1980 at Wexford Park, between Rathnure and Buffers Alley, in what was their first meeting in a final in three years. Rathnure won the match by 2–15 to 1–07 to claim their 12th championship title overall and their second title in succession.

== Results ==
=== Final ===
14 September 1980 Final	Rathnure	2-15 - 1-07	Buffers Alley	Wexford Park
