= 1994 Wexford Senior Hurling Championship =

Annual hurling competition season

- Champions: Oulart–The Ballagh (1st title)
- Runners-up: St Martin's

The 1994 Wexford Senior Hurling Championship was the 84th completed staging of the Wexford Senior Hurling Championship since its establishment by the Wexford County Board in 1889.

Cloughbawn entered the championship as the defending champions.

The final was played on 16 October 1994 at Wexford Park, between Oulart–The Ballagh and St Martin's, in what was their first ever meeting in the final. Oulart–The Ballagh won the match by 1–14 to 0–16 to claim their first ever championship title.

== Results ==
=== Final ===
16 October 1994 Final	Oulart–The Ballagh	1-14 - 0-16	St Martin's	Wexford Park
	S Dunne 0-6, M Redmond 1-2, M Storey 0-4, L Dunne 0-1, P Redmond 0-1.		J Quirke 0-11, R McCarthy 0-2, P Murphy 0-2, D Myers 0-1.
