= 1986 Wexford Senior Hurling Championship =

Annual hurling competition season

- Champions: Rathnure (13th title)
- Runners-up: Buffers Alley

The 1986 Wexford Senior Hurling Championship was the 76th completed staging of the Wexford Senior Hurling Championship since its establishment by the Wexford County Board in 1889.

Buffers Alley entered the championship as the defending champions.

The final was played on 5 October 1986 at Wexford Park, between Rathnure and Buffers Alley, in what was their fifth meeting in the final overall and a first meeting in six years. Rathnure won the match by 2–16 to 1–14 to claim their 13th championship title overall and a first title in six years.

== Results ==
=== Final ===
5 October 1986 Final	Rathnure	2-16 - 1-14	Buffers Alley	Wexford Park
	J Codd 1-3, J Holohan 0-6, N Hearne 1-2, J Murphy 0-2, P Codd 0-1, J Quigley 0-1, M Morrissey 0-1.		M Butler 1-8, T Dempsey 0-2, F O'Leary 0-1, T Doran 0-1, S O'Leary 0-1, S Whelan 0-1.
