= 1974 Wexford Senior Hurling Championship =

Annual hurling competition season

- Champions: Rathnure (9th title)
- Runners-up: Oulart–the Ballagh

The 1974 Wexford Senior Hurling Championship was the 64th completed staging of the Wexford Senior Hurling Championship since its establishment by the Wexford County Board in 1889.

Rathnure entered the championship as the defending champions.

The final was played on 29 September 1974 at St Patrick's Park in Enniscorthy, between Rathnure and Oulart–the Ballagh, in what was their first ever meeting in the final. Rathnure won the match by 2–08 to 1–05 to claim their ninth championship title overall and a fourth title in succession.

== Results ==
=== Final ===
29 September 1974 Final	Rathnure	2-08 - 1-05	Oulart–the Ballagh	St Patrick's Park
	D Quigley 1-3, P Flynn 1-1, M Quigley 0-1, J Quigley 0-1, J O'Connor 0-1, L Byrne 0-1.		T Byrne 1-3, PJ Harris 0-1, L Byrne 0-1.
