= 1999 Wexford Senior Hurling Championship =

Annual hurling competition season

- Champions: St Martin's (1st title)
- Runners-up: Rathnure

The 1999 Wexford Senior Hurling Championship was the 89th completed staging of the Wexford Senior Hurling Championship since its establishment by the Wexford County Board in 1889.

Rathnure entered the championship as the defending champions.

The final was played on 10 October 1999 at St Patrick's Park in Enniscorthy, between St Martin's and Rathnure, in what was their first ever meeting in the final. St Martin's won the match by 1–11 to 1–09 to claim their first ever championship title.

== Results ==
=== Final ===
| 10 October 1999 Final | St Martin's | 1-11 - 1-09 | Rathnure | St Patrick's Park |
| | P Murphy 1-1, R Lambert 0-3, T Radford 0-3 (1 sideline); J O'Connor 0-2 (2 frees), D Murphy 0-1 (free), B Lambert 0-1. | | P Codd 0-6 (6 frees); M Morrissey 1-1, R Guiney 0-1, C Byrne 0-1. |
