= Geraldine O'Hanrahans GAA =

Gaelic games club in County Wexford, Ireland

Geraldine O'Hanrahans
- Gearaltaigh Uí Annracháin
- County: Wexford
- Colours: Blue with gold stripe
- Grounds: O'Kennedy Park, New Ross
- Coordinates: 52.40409°N 6.933864°W

Playing kits
Standard colours

Senior Club Championships
	All Ireland	Leinster champions	Wexford champions
Football:	0	0	1
Hurling:	0	0	4

Geraldine O'Hanrahans is a Gaelic Athletic Association club based in New Ross in County Wexford, Ireland.

== History ==
The club was founded in the 1900s and takes its name from the FitzGerald dynasty and Michael O'Hanrahan, a New Ross man who was executed after the 1916 Easter Rising.

== Honours ==
- Wexford Senior Hurling Championships (4): 1943, 1944, 1945, 1966
- Wexford Intermediate Hurling Championships (2): 1957, 1975
- Wexford Junior Football Championships (2): 1963, 2011
- Wexford Junior Hurling Championships (1): 1995
- Wexford Minor Football Championships (2): 1971, 1972
- Wexford Minor Hurling Championships (6): 1931, 1932, 1933, 1935, 1936, 1940

== Notable players ==
- Ned Colfer
- Tom Neville
- Seán O'Kennedy
- Shane Roche
- Tommy Kinsella
