= Wexford Senior Hurling Championship =

Annual hurling competition

- Current season or competition: 2026 Wexford Senior Hurling Championship
- Irish: Craobh Iomána Sinsearach Loch Garman
- Code: Hurling
- Founded: 1889; 137 years ago
- Region: Wexford (GAA)
- Trophy: Dr. R. J. Bowe Cup
- No. of teams: 12
- Title holders: Shelmaliers (3rd title)
- Most titles: Rathnure (20 titles)
- Sponsors: Pettitt's SuperValu
- TV partner: TG4
- Official website: Wexford GAA

The Wexford Senior Hurling Championship (known for sponsorship reasons as the Pettitt's SuperValu Senior Hurling Championship) is an annual hurling competition contested by top-tier Wexford GAA clubs. The Wexford County Board of the Gaelic Athletic Association has organised it since 1889.

Shelmaliers are the title holders after defeating Rathnure by 1-18 to 2–13 in the final.

== History ==
The title has been won at least once by 28 different teams. The all-time record-holders are Rathnure who have won a total of 20 titles.

Since 1994 the Wexford County Championship has been sponsored by Wexford-based supermarket Pettitt's SuperValu. It is one of the longest sponsorship deals of any county championship in Ireland.

== Format ==
The series of games are played during the spring and autumn months with the county final currently being played at Chadwicks Wexford Park in October. Initially played as a knock-out competition, the championship currently uses a round robin format followed by a knock-out stage.

The Wexford County Championship features a group stage followed by a knock-out stage. Each team in the championship is guaranteed at least five games. Relegation and promotion also takes place with the second tier Wexford Intermediate Hurling Championship.

=== Group stage ===
Group stage: The 12 club teams are divided into two groups of six. Over the course of the group stage, each team plays once against the others in the group, resulting in each team being guaranteed at least five games. Two points are awarded for a win, one for a draw and zero for a loss. The teams are ranked in the group stage table by points gained, then scoring difference and then their head-to-head record. The top three teams in each group progress to the quarter-finals. The 4th and 5th-placed teams advance to preliminary quarter-finals.

=== Knockout stage ===
Preliminary quarter-finals: The 4th-placed teams face the 5th-placed team of the other group. The 2 winners advance to the quarter-finals

Quarter-finals: The top three teams in each group and the winners of the preliminary quarter-finals contest this round. The 1st-placed teams play the winner of the preliminary quarter-finals and the 2nd-placed teams play the 3rd-placed teams from the other group. The four winners from these four games advance to the semi-finals.

Semi-finals: The four quarter-final winners contest this round. The two winners from these two games advance to the final.

Final: The two semi-final winners contest the final. The winning team are declared champions.

=== Relegation ===
The 6th-placed teams from the group stage take part in a relegation play-off, with the losing team being relegated to the Wexford Intermediate Hurling Championship.

== Qualification for subsequent competitions ==
At the end of the championship, the winning team qualify to the subsequent Leinster Senior Club Hurling Championship, the winner of which progresses to the All-Ireland Senior Club Hurling Championship.

== Teams ==
=== 2026 Teams ===
Team	Location	Division	Colours	Position in 2026	In championship since	Championship titles	Last championship title
Faythe Harriers	Wexford	Wexford District	Purple and gold	Quarter-finals	?	5	2001
Ferns St Aidan's	Ferns	Gorey District	Red and white	Quarter-finals	?	1	2022
Fethard St Mogue's	Fethard-on-Sea	New Ross District	Red and white	Relegation final	2026	0	—
Glynn–Barntown	Glynn and Barntown	Wexford District	Blue and green	Preliminary quarter-finals	?	0	—
Naomh Éanna	Gorey	Gorey District	Green, white and yellow	Semi-finals	?	2	2023
Oulart–The Ballagh	Oulart and The Ballagh	Enniscorthy District	Black and red	Preliminary quarter-finals	2023	13	2016
Oylegate–Glenbrien	Oylegate and Glenbrien	Enniscorthy District	Blue and white	Quarter-finals	2022	1	1963
Rapparees	Enniscorthy	Enniscorthy District	Red and yellow	Relegated	?	2	2021
Rathnure	Rathnure	Enniscorthy District	Black and amber	Runners-up	2025	20	2006
Shelmaliers	Castlebridge	Wexford District	Black and amber	Champions	?	3	2026
St Anne's	Rathangan	Wexford District	Blue and navy	Quarter-finals	?	2	2000
St Martin's	Murrintown	Wexford District	Maroon and white	Semi-finals	?	6	2025

== Honours ==
The winning team is presented with the Dr. R. J. Bowe Cup. A native of Enniscorthy, Bowe served as team doctor to the Wexford senior hurling team for a period of 25 years from the 1960s until the late 1980s.

The Wexford Senior Hurling Championship winners qualify for the subsequent Leinster Senior Club Hurling Championship. A team representing Wexford has won the provincial title on 10 occasions.

The Wexford County Championship is an integral part of the wider Leinster Senior Club Hurling Championship. The winners of the Wexford county final join the champions of the other hurling counties to contest the provincial championship.

== List of finals ==
=== Legend ===
- Gold – Leinster senior club champions
- Silver – Leinster senior club runners-up
- (r) = replay

=== List of Wexford SHC finals ===
Year	Winners		Runners-up		Date	Location	Teams
Year	Club	Score	Club	Score	Date	Location	Teams
1887							
1888							
1889	Blackwater	2-06	Oulart	0-00	16 Sept	Kilthomas	Capitan of Oulart: Murphy
1890	Blackwater						
1891	Crossbeg						
1892							
1893							
1894							
1895	Castlebridge						
1896	Castlebridge						
1897							
1898	Blackwater						
1899							
1900							
1901							
1902							
1903	Slaney Harriers						
1904	Castlebridge						
1905	Rathgarogue						
1906							
1907	Castlebridge						
1908	Castlebridge						
1909	Castlebridge						
1910	Ballymurn						
1911	Ballymurn						
1912	Ross-Rathgarogue						
1913	New Ross						
1914	Enniscorthy Rapparees						
1915	Glenbrien						
1916	Glenbrien						
1917							
1918	Castlebridge	1-05	Glenbrien	0-02			
1919	Crossabeg						
1920							
1921	Screen						
1922							
1923							
1924	St Anne's						
1925							
1926	Adamstown	8-02	Castlebridge	4-00	10 Apr		Adamstown - J. Furlong (captain), R. Eustace (goal), J. McGrath, J. L. Tector, J. Foley, W. Kelly, M. Byrne, M. McDonald, J. McDonald, W. Carroll, T. O'Brien, J. O'Brien, W. Furlong, P. Lawlor, M. Lawlor
1927	Adamstown	5-01	Sally Beachers	2-06	19 Jan	Bellefield	Adamstown - J. Furlong (captain), R. Eustace (goal), J. McGrath, J. McDonald, M. McDonald, M. Byrne, J. Foley, W. Carroll, W. Furlong, J. L. Tector, W. Kelly, T. Doyle, M. Lawlor, P. Lawlor, J. McDonagh
1928	Sally Beachers						
1929	St Fintan's	0-08	John Street Volunteers	0-06			
1930	Sally Beachers						
1931	Adamstown	5-03	Sally Beachers	4-02	6 Dec	Barrett's Park	Adamstown - R. Eustace (goal), J. Cooney, J. McDonald (captain), M. O'Neill, J. Brennan, T. Quigley, T. Doyle, J. Morrissey, J. McDonagh, J. L. Tector, T. Butler, T. Foley, J. Doyle, B. Nugent, C. Bradley. Sub: N. McDonald
1932	Adamstown	3-07	St Fintan's	3-02	30 May	Wexford Park	Adamstowm - R. Eustace (goal), J. Cooney, J. McDonald (captain), J. Brennan, T. Doyle, T. Quigley, M. O'Neill, B. Nugent, B. Bradley, T. Foley, J. Morrissey, J. L. Tector, T. Butler, J. Doyle, J. McDonagh. Subs: P. Doyle, P. Furlong, P. Moloney, M. Whelan
1933	Adamstown	4-04	Sally Beachers Castlebridge	1-01	18 Sept	Wexford Park	Adamstown - J. McDonald, R. Eustace, J. Doyle, T. Furlong, J. L. Tector, T. Foley, T. Doyle, C. Bradley, B. Nugent, J. Morrissey, P. Moloney, T. Quigley, M. Neill, J. Conney, J. Brennan; Sally Beachers - J. Fogarty, J. Dalton, R. Browne, P. Browne, J. Kinsella, A. Breen, P. Breen, J. Doyle, M. Murphy, E. Roche, J. Murphy, M. Byrne, F. Kinsella, K. Murphy, M. Whelan
1934	St Fintan's	2-04	Adamstown	1-06	7 Oct	Wexford Park	Adamstown - R. Eustace (goal), J. Cooney, J. McDonald (captain), M. O'Neill, B. Nugent, T. Quigley, T. Furlong, T. Foley, J. Brennan, T. Butler, J. Morrissey, J. Doyle, J. L. Tector, L. Furlong, J. Foley
1935	Adamstown	1-08	St Fintan's	1-01	24 Nov	Wexford Park	Adamstown - R. Eustace, M. Foley, J. McDonald (captain), M. O'Neill, M. Galway, T. Quigley, L. Furlong, B. Nugent, J. Doyle, T. Butler, T. Furlong, J. Foley, M. Whelan, T. Foley, J. L. Tector
1936	Adamstown	0-05 (RP 7-03)	St Fintan's	1-02 (RP 4-04)	15 May and RP 11 July	Barrett's Park	Adamstown - R. Eustace, M. Foley, J. McDonald, M. O'Neill, M. Whelan, T. Quigley, M. Redmond, J. Foley, B. Nugent, T. Doyle, T. Butler, T. Foley, J. L. Tector, T. Shannon, T. Furlong. Adamstown (RP) - R. Eustace, M. Foley, J. McDonald, M. O'Neill, M. Whelan, T. Quigley, J. Redmond, J. Foley, B. Nugent, T. Doyle, T. Butler, T. Foley, L. Tector, T. Shannon, J. Doyle
1937	Adamstown	6-05	St Fintan's	1-01	14 Nov	Bellefield	Adamstown - R. Eustace (goal), M. Foley, J. McDonald Snr, M. O'Neill, J. McDonald Jnr, Tom Doyle, J. Redmond, B. Nugent, J. Foley, F. Galway, Tom Butler, Tom Foley, Kevin Whelan, Tom Shannon and Jimmy Doyle; St Fintan's - P. Sinnott (goal), J. Lynch, W. Boggan, J. Dillon, J. Murphy (captain), N. Boggan, J. Quirke, E. Roche, P. Boggan, P. Culleton, T. Rowe, M. O'Reilly, J. Furlong, W. Roche, F. Murphy. Sub - J. Devereux
1938	Unfinished						
1939	Geraldine O'Hanrahans	4-05	Ferns St Aidan's	3-03			
1940	Adamstown	4-01	Ferns St Aidan's	3-01	8 Sept	Wexford Park	Adamstown - T. Doyle (captain), R. Eustace (goal), J. Redmond, M. O'Neill, W. Walsh, M. Foley, B. Nugent, J. McDonald, J. Foley, T. Foley, T. Butler, T. Shannon, M. Whelan, T. Foley, K. Whelan. Subs - Joe Bradley, T. McCabe; Ferns - P. Byrne (captain), J. Doran (goal), E. Doran, M. Berney, E. Kiely, W. Murphy, J. Foley, J. Kenny, A. Kenny, M. Doyle, M. Gahan, T. Leary, J. Treacy, M. Kavanagh, A. Kiely
1941	Adamstown	5-05	Ferns St Aidan's	1-02	14 Sept	Barrett's Park	Adamstown - D. Eustace (goal), T. Foley, T. Shannon, T. McCabe, M. Whelan, P. Walsh, Tom Butler, Jn. Foley, Thos. Foley, J. Redmond, M. Foley, J. McDonald, B. Nugent, P. O'Neill, W. Walsh; Ferns - D. Doran (goal), E. Kiely, R. Doran, John Gahan, J. Kenny, M. Bernie, James Nolan, Wm. Murphy, Patk. Byrne, Joe Treacy, M. Gahan, A. Kiely, A. Kenny, C. Furlong, M. Kavanagh
1942	Adamstown	6-06	Rathnure	4-01	30 Aug	Barrett's Park	Adamstown - T. Butler, R. Eustace (goal), L. Shannon, J. Shannon, K. Whelan, Tom Foley, John Foley, W. Foley, P. Walshe, M. Foley, Ben Nugent, J. Redmond, M. O'Neill, M. Whelan; Rathnure - A. Somers (goal), J. Morrissey, P. Quigley, J. Murphy, T. Connors, S. Redmond, J. Blackburne, W. Murphy, M. Redmond, P. O'Connor, N. Rackard, Wm. Murphy, M. Holohan, D. Taylor, S. Murphy
1943	New Ross United		St Martin's				
1944	New Ross United		Enniscorthy District				
1945	New Ross United		St Martin's/St Fintan's				
1946	St Aidan's Enniscorthy		Rathnure				
1947	St Aidan's Enniscorthy		Rathnure				
1948	Rathnure	3-05	St Aidan's Enniscorthy	0-02			
1949	Cloughbawn		Rathnure				
1950	Rathnure	5–10	St Aidan's Enniscorthy	2-06			
1951	Cloughbawn		Horeswood				
1952	St Aidan's Enniscorthy	2-12	Horeswood	0-02			
1953	St Aidan's Enniscorthy		Geraldine O'Hanrahans				
1954	St Aidan's Enniscorthy	5-05	Horeswood	0-05			
1955	Rathnure	2-09	St Aidan's Enniscorthy	2-05			
1956	St Aidan's Enniscorthy	5-08	Cloughbawn	1-08			
1957	St Aidan's Enniscorthy	5–10	Rathnure	2-05			
1958	St Aidan's Enniscorthy	3-11	Geraldine O'Hanrahans	2-10			
1959	St Aidan's Enniscorthy	1-07	Faythe Harriers	1-05			
1960	Faythe Harriers	5-10	Oylegate–Glenbrien	2-05			
1961	Rathnure	3-10	St Aidan's Enniscorthy	1-04			
1962	Faythe Harriers	4-11	Geraldine O'Hanrahans	1-04			
1963	Oylegate–Glenbrien	6-09	Horeswood	2-04			
1964	Enniscorthy Shamrocks	1-13	Faythe Harriers	2-09			
1965	Faythe Harriers	3-08 (D) 4-08 (R)	Rathnure	2-11 (D) 4-06 (R)			
1966	Geraldine O'Hanrahans	3-14 (D) 2-10 (R)	Enniscorthy Shamrocks	3-14 (D) 3-04 (R)			
1967	Rathnure	4-13	Buffers Alley	1-04			
1968	Buffers Alley	4-08	Faythe Harriers	5-03		Bellefield	
1969	Enniscorthy Shamrocks	4-04	Ferns St Aidan's	2-06			
1970	Buffers Alley	4-16	Enniscorthy Shamrocks	1-04			
1971	Rathnure	4-09	Enniscorthy District	3-08		Bellefield	
1972	Rathnure	1-17	Rapparees	1-08		New Ross	
1973	Rathnure	2-07	Buffers Alley	1-07			
1974	Rathnure	2-08	Oulart–The Ballagh	1-05			
1975	Buffers Alley	3-10	Oulart–The Ballagh	2-07			
1976	Buffers Alley	1-11	Rapparees	2-04			
1977	Rathnure	2-07	Buffers Alley	2-04			
1978	Rapparees	0-16	Rathnure	2-07			
1979	Rathnure	3-09 (D) 1-11 (1R) 0-09 (2R)	Faythe Harriers	2-12 (D) 2-08 (1R) 0-08 (2R)			
1980	Rathnure	2-15	Buffers Alley	1-07			
1981	Faythe Harriers	2–10	Buffers Alley	2-09		Bellefield	
1982	Buffers Alley	1-09	Oulart–The Ballagh	1-06			
1983	Buffers Alley	1–13	St Martin's	1-01			
1984	Buffers Alley	2-05	Faythe Harriers	0-05			
1985	Buffers Alley	1–14	Faythe Harriers	1–12			
1986	Rathnure	2–16	Buffers Alley	1–14			
1987	Rathnure	2-06	Cloughbawn	0-09			
1988	Buffers Alley	2–10	Rathnure	1-05			
1989	Buffers Alley	3–16	Oulart–The Ballagh	2–13			
1990	Rathnure	2-08	Cloughbawn	1-08			
1991	Buffers Alley	2–10	Faythe Harriers	1-07			
1992	Buffers Alley	1–12	Oulart–The Ballagh	1-05			
1993	Cloughbawn	2–10	Rapparees	2-07			
1994	Oulart–The Ballagh	1–14	St Martin's	0–16			
1995	Oulart–The Ballagh	2–15	Glynn-Barntown	2-09			
1996	Rathnure	1–12	Rapparees	0-07			
1997	Oulart–The Ballagh	2–11	Glynn–Barntown	0–14			
1998	Rathnure	0–13	Rapparees	0–12			
1999	St Martin's	1–11	Rathnure	1-09			
2000	St Anne's	2–12	Oulart–The Ballagh	2–10			
2001	Faythe Harriers	0–13	Rapparees	0-09			
2002	Rathnure	1–10	Cloughbawn	2-05			
2003	Rathnure	3-09	Glynn–Barntown	1–13			
2004	Oulart–The Ballagh	1–17	Rathnure	1–10			
2005	Oulart–The Ballagh	1–15	St Martin's	1-09			
2006	Rathnure	0–16	Oulart–The Ballagh	1-13 (draw)			
	Rathnure	1–12	Oulart–The Ballagh	0-09 (replay)			
2007	Oulart–The Ballagh	4–14	Buffers Alley	2-06			
2008	St Martin's	1–13	Oulart–The Ballagh	1-08			
2009	Oulart–The Ballagh	3–12	Buffers Alley	1–13			
2010	Oulart–The Ballagh	1–14	St Martin's	0-06			Oulart–The Ballagh - Keith Rossiter (Captain)
2011	Oulart–The Ballagh	1–10	Rathnure	0–11			
2012	Oulart–The Ballagh	2–12	Faythe Harriers	0–13	14 Oct		Oulart–The Ballagh - Keith Rossiter (Captain)
2013	Oulart–The Ballagh	3–12	Ferns St Aidan's	1–16	20 Oct	Wexford Park	
2014	Shelmaliers	3-08	St Anne's	1–11	26 Oct	Wexford Park	
2015	Oulart–The Ballagh	2–15	St Martin's	0–13	25 October	Wexford Park	
2016	Oulart–The Ballagh	0–17	Cloughbawn	1–11	16 October 2016	Wexford Park	
2017	St Martin's	2–16	Oulart–The Ballagh	1-09	22 October 2017	Wexford Park	L White; W Devereux, P O'Connor, C Firman; D Waters, A Maddock, P Kelly; H O'Connor, M Maloney; J Firman, Joe O'Connor, Jack O'Connor; C Lyng, R O'Connor, D Codd.
2018	Naomh Éanna	2–11	St Martin's	0–13	21 October 2018	Wexford Park	
2019	St Martin's	1–15	St Anne's Rathangan	1–13	27 October 2019	Wexford Park	
2020	Shelmaliers	3–18	Naomh Éanna	3–11	23 August 2020	Wexford Park	
2021	Rapparees	6–18	St Anne's Rathangan	1–17	19 September 2021	Wexford Park	
2022	Ferns St Aidan's	1-20	St Martin's	0-22	14 August 2022	Wexford Park	
2023	Naomh Éanna	2–18	Oylegate–Glenbrien	2–12	20 August 2023	Wexford Park	
2024	St Martin's	1-22	St Anne's Rathangan	0–19	3 November 2024	Wexford Park	
2025	St Martin's	2-14	Rathnure	0-16	26 November	Wexford Park	
2026	Shelmaliers	1-18	Rathnure	2-13	25 October	Wexford Park	

== Roll of honour ==
#	Club	Titles	Championships won
1	Rathnure	20	1948, 1950, 1955, 1961, 1967, 1971, 1972, 1973, 1974, 1977, 1979, 1980, 1986, 1987, 1990, 1996, 1998, 2002, 2003, 2006
2	Oulart–The Ballagh	13	1994, 1995, 1997, 2004, 2005, 2007, 2009, 2010, 2011, 2012, 2013, 2015, 2016
3	Buffers Alley	12	1968, 1970, 1975, 1976, 1982, 1983, 1984, 1985, 1988, 1989, 1991, 1992
4	Adamstown	11	1926, 1927, 1931, 1932, 1933, 1935, 1936, 1937 1940, 1941, 1942
5	St Aidan's Enniscorthy	9	1946, 1947, 1952, 1953, 1954, 1956, 1957, 1958, 1959
6	St Martin's	6	1999, 2008, 2017, 2019, 2024, 2025
7	Faythe Harriers	5	1960, 1962, 1965, 1981, 2001
8	Geraldine O'Hanrahans	4	1943, 1944, 1945, 1966
9	Blackwater	3	1889, 1890, 1898
9	Cloughbawn	3	1949, 1951, 1993
9	Castlebridge	3	1904, 1910, 1919
9	Shelmaliers	3	2014, 2020, 2026
13	Rapparees	2	1978, 2021
13	Glenbrien	2	1915, 1916
13	St Anne's	2	1924, 2000
13	Sally Beachers	2	1928, 1930
13	St Fintan's	2	1929, 1934
13	Shamrocks	2	1964, 1969
13	Naomh Éanna	2	2018, 2023
20	Slaney Harriers	1	1903
20	Rathgarogue	1	1905
20	Ross/Rathgarogue	1	1912
20	New Ross	1	1913
20	Red Rapparees	1	1914
20	Ballymurn	1	1911
20	Crossabeg	1	1918
20	O'Hanrahans, New Ross	1	1939
20	Oylegate–Glenbrien	1	1963
20	Ferns St Aidan's	1	2022

== Records and statistics ==
=== Managers ===
Managers in the Wexford Championship are involved in the day-to-day running of the team, including the training, team selection, and sourcing of players. Their influence varies from club-to-club and is related to the individual club committees. The manager is assisted by a team of two or three selectors and a backroom team consisting of various coaches.

Winning managers
Manager	Team	Wins	Winning years
Séamus Murphy	Rathnure	1	1996, 2002, 2003
Willie Sunderland	Oulart–The Ballagh	1	2004, 2005
Liam Dunne	Oulart–The Ballagh	1	2009, 2010
Vinny Parker	Shelmaliers	2	2014, 2020
Frank Flannery	Oulart–The Ballagh	1	2015, 2016
Tomás Codd	St Martin's	2	2017, 2019
Tony Walsh	Faythe Harriers	1	2001
Teddy O'Connor	Rathnure	1	2006
Kevin Ryan	Oulart–The Ballagh	1	2007
Roy Coleman	St Martin's	1	2008
Brendan O'Connor	Oulart–The Ballagh	1	2011
Pat Herbert	Oulart–The Ballagh	1	2012
Martin Storey	Oulart–The Ballagh	1	2013
Louis Cullen	Naomh Éanna	1	2018
Declan Ruth	Rapparees	1	2021

=== Teams ===
==== By decade ====
The most successful teams of each decade, judged by number of Wexford Senior Hurling Championship titles, is as follows:

- 1910s: 2 each for Castlebridge (1910–19) and Glenbrien (1915–16)
- 1920s: 2 for Adamstown (1926–27)
- 1930s: 6 for Adamstown (1931-32-33-35-36-37)
- 1940s: 3 for Geraldine O'Hanrahans (1943-44-45)
- 1950s: 7 for St Aidan's Enniscorthy (1952-53-54-56-57-58-59)
- 1960s: 3 for Faythe Harriers (1960-62-65)
- 1970s: 6 for Rathnure (1971-72-73-74-77-79)
- 1980s: 6 for Buffers Alley (1982-83-84-85-88-89)
- 1990s: 3 each for Rathnure (1990-96-98) and Oulart–The Ballagh (1994-95-97)
- 2000s: 4 for Oulart–The Ballagh (2004-05-07-09)
- 2010s: 6 for Oulart–The Ballagh (2010-11-12-13-15-16)
- 2020s: 2 for St Martin's (2024-25) and Shelmaliers (2020-26)

==== Gaps ====
Top five longest gaps between successive championship titles:

- 76 years: St Anne's Rathangan (1924–2000)
- 42 years: Cloughbawn (1951–1993)
- 21 years: Geraldine O'Hanrahans (1945–1966)
- 20 years: Faythe Harriers (1981–2001)
- 16 years: Faythe Harriers (1965–1981)

== See also ==
- Wexford Intermediate Hurling Championship (Tier 2)
- Wexford Intermediate A Hurling Championship (Tier 3)
- Wexford Junior Hurling Championship (Tier 4)
- Wexford Junior A Hurling Championship (Tier 5)
- Wexford Junior B Hurling Championship (Tier 6)
