= Shelmaliers GAA =

Sports club in County Wexford, Ireland

Shelmaliers
- Síol Maoluír
- Founded: 1886
- County: Wexford
- Nickname: Shels
- Colours: Black and Amber
- Grounds: Hollymount, Castlebridge
- Coordinates: 52°23′13″N 6°25′36″W

Playing kits
Home kit	change kit

Senior Club Championships
	All Ireland	Leinster champions	Wexford champions
Football:	0	0	3
Hurling:	0	0	3

Shelmaliers is a Gaelic Athletic Association club based in Castlebridge, County Wexford, Ireland. The club was founded in 1886, with the name Shelmaliers being adopted in 1952, and fields teams in hurling, Gaelic football and camogie. The club’s name is taken from the county’s historic Shelmalier baronies.

== Location ==
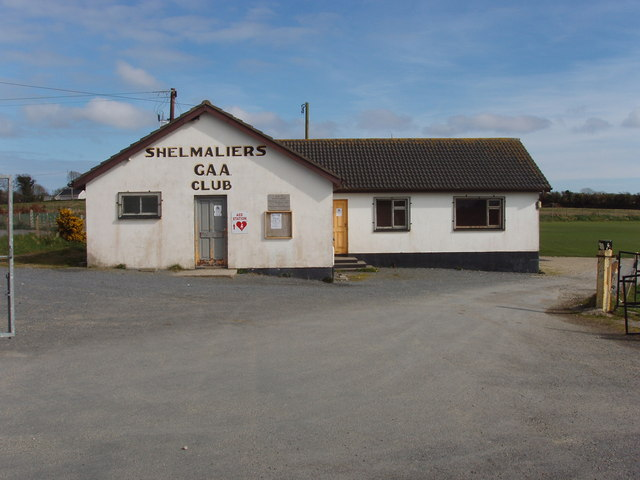
Shelmaliers clubhouse in 2009

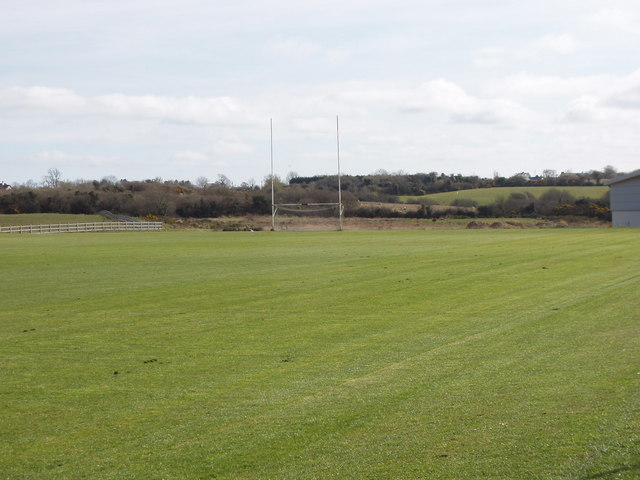
Shelmaliers pitch

Shelmaliers represents a parish of three centres – historic Castlebridge, Screen at the northern end, and the seaside area of Curracloe. The club is in the "over the water" area, just north of the town of Wexford.

== History ==
Evidence suggests that the game of hurling had been played in the area long before the foundation of the Gaelic Athletic Association in 1884. Two years later in 1886 the club played its first game under the auspices of the association – a game of football against Our Lady's Island in October 1886.

Over the next fifty years the club, under various names such as the Emmets, the Redmonds, and the Sally Beachers, enjoyed a golden age, winning thirteen senior hurling titles and one senior football title. The club represented Wexford in the All-Ireland championship on five occasions. Their finest hour was in 1910, when Wexford, represented by Castlebridge, won its first All-Ireland senior hurling title.

The Shelmaliers name was adopted in 1952, when the old Ibars and Ardcolm clubs merged. County junior hurling titles followed in 1954 and 1966.

Other titles have been annexed in the intervening period, winning a junior football championship in 1985, and an intermediate hurling title in 1997.

John Hegarty managed the club to the Wexford SFC. He was still Shelmaliers manager when the County Board appointed him as manager of the county football team in 2022. He continued as club manager for the SFC.

== Facilities ==
The 1970s saw the club move to its present grounds at Hollymount, the start of a process of development which is continuing today. The club now have three pitches, and have purchased land for a fourth pitch.

== Notable players ==
- Ross Banville
- Brian Doyle
- Jack Harding
- Séamus Hearne
- Mick Morrissey
- Eoghan O'Gara, the Dublin All-Ireland SFC winner, transferred to the club in 2022 as his wife is from there

== Honours ==
- Wexford Senior Hurling Championship (3): 2014, 2020, 2026
- Wexford Senior Football Championship (3): 2018, 2021, 2023
- Wexford Intermediate Football Championship (1): 2007
- Wexford Intermediate Hurling Championship (1): 1997
- Wexford Junior Football Championship (2): 1973, 1985
- Wexford Junior Hurling Championship (4): 1954, 1966, 1988, 2016
- Wexford Under-21 Football Championship (6) 2003, 2004, 2010, 2013, 2014, 2016
- Wexford Under-21 Hurling Championship (2) 2008, 2009
- Wexford Minor Football Championship (5) 2003, 2004, 2010, 2011, 2012
- Wexford Minor Hurling Championship (5) 2006, 2007, 2008, 2009, 2021
