= O'Kennedy Park =

Stadium in New Ross, Ireland

- Páirc Uí Chinnéide
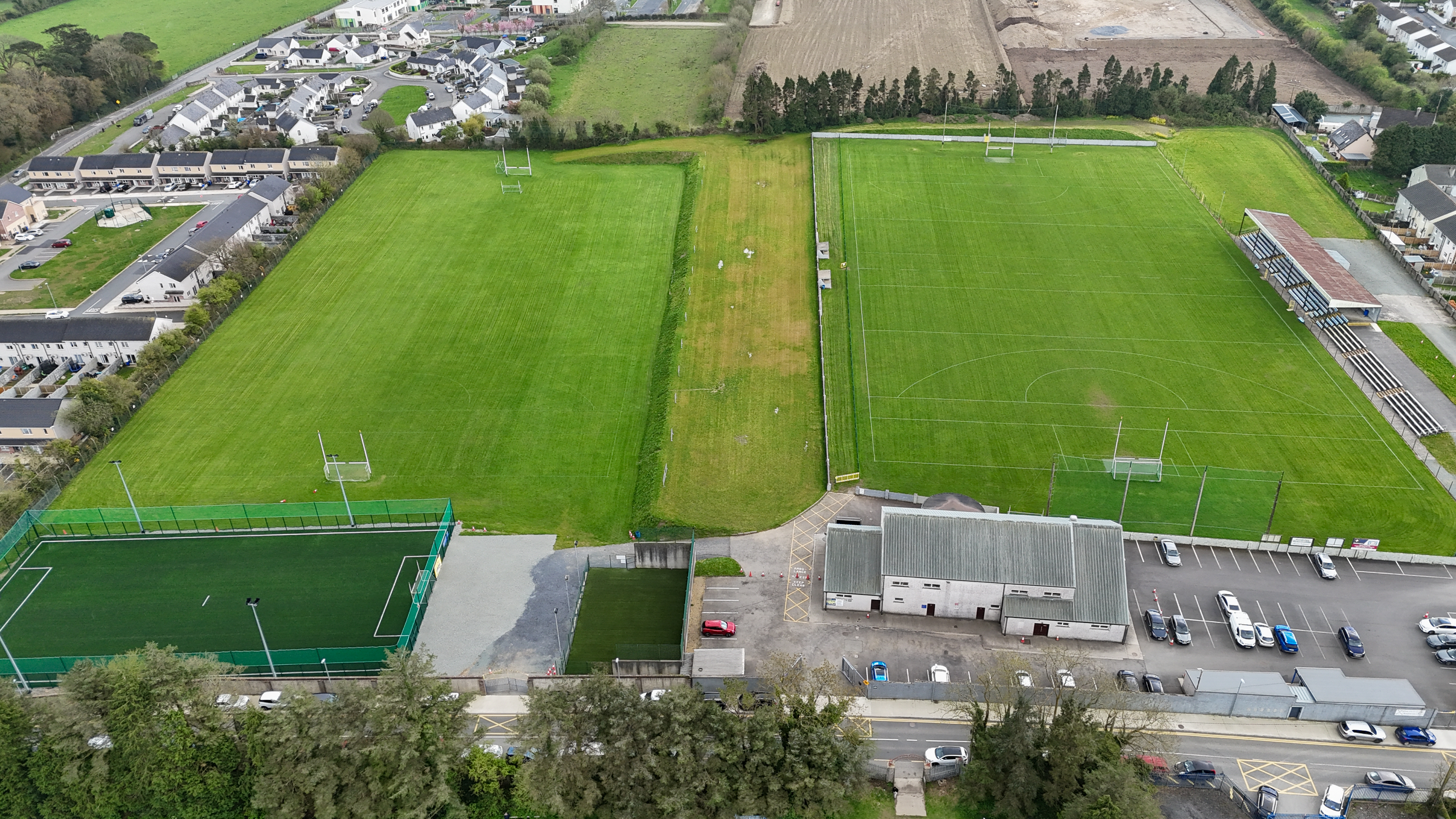
- Interactive map of O'Kennedy Park
- Location: New Ross, County Wexford, Ireland
- Coordinates: 52.404097°N 6.933864°W
- Owner: Geraldine O'Hanrahan's GAA
- Surface: Grass
- Public transit: Dunbrody Inn bus stop

O'Kennedy Park (sometimes designated Kennedy Park) is a GAA stadium in New Ross, County Wexford, Ireland. It is the main ground of Geraldine O'Hanrahan's Gaelic football and hurling teams and has also hosted inter-county fixtures. It was named O'Kennedy Park in 1953 after Seán O'Kennedy and Gus O'Kennedy in recognition of their contributions to Wexford GAA.

Its former name was Barrett's Park.

== See also ==
- List of Gaelic Athletic Association stadiums
