= McCauley Park Bellefield =

Stadium in Enniscorthy, Ireland

- Páirc Nic Amhlaí
- Location within Ireland
- Location: Enniscorthy, County Wexford, Ireland
- Coordinates: 52°30′12″N 6°34′45″W
- Public transit: Enniscorthy railway station Enniscorthy bus stop (William Street)
- Owner: Rapparees Starlights GAA
- Capacity: 2,000
- Field size: 151 m × 86 m (165 yd × 94 yd)
- Surface: grass

McCauley Park Bellefield (Irish: Páirc Nic Amhlaí) is a GAA stadium in Enniscorthy, County Wexford, Ireland. It is the main ground of Rapparees Starlights GAA's Gaelic football and hurling teams and has also hosted inter-county fixtures.

Bellefield or Bellfield is the name of an area northwest of Enniscorthy; a big house of this name was built in late 18th century by the Lett family. It is a compound of the French bel[le], "pretty" and "field." The park is named for local businessman Sam McCauley who supplied much of the funding.

== See also ==
- List of Gaelic Athletic Association stadiums
