= Cloughbawn GAA =

Gaelic sports club in County Wexford, Ireland

Cloughbawn
- Cloch Bán
- Founded: 1918
- County: Wexford
- Colours
- Grounds: Cloughbawn GAA Grounds

Playing kits
Standard colours

Senior Club Championships
	All Ireland	Leinster champions	Wexford champions
Hurling:	0	0	3

Cloughbawn GAA is a Gaelic Athletic Association club near Clonroche, County Wexford, Ireland. The club is affiliated to the Wexford County Board and fields teams in Gaelic football, hurling and camogie.

== History ==
Located in the parish of Cloughbawn, around 11 km (7 mi) south-west of Enniscorthy town, Cloughbawn GAA Club was founded in 1918, after a number of young hurlers got together after a mummers ball in Forrestalstown and decided that there should be a club formed.

Cloughbawn spent its early years operating in the junior grade and won Wexford JHC titles in 1935 and 1946. The club claimed its first Wexford SHC title in 1949, following a 4–02 to 2–06 win over Rathnure in the final. Cloughbawn claimed a second title in 1951, after beating Horeswood in a replay. After a period without success, Cloughbawn made a breakthrough in 1972 by winning a third Wexford JHC title. The club won its first Wexford IHC title the following year and made a return to the top flight. Cloughbawn won a fourth and final Wexford JHC title in 1980.

Cloughbawn won a third Wexford SHC title in 1993, after a 2–10 to 2–07 win over Rapparees in a final replay. The club's most recent success came in 2026, when Cloughbawn beat Davidstown/Courtnacuddy to win a second Wexford IHC title.

== Honours ==
- Wexford Senior Hurling Championship (3): 1949, 1951, 1993
- Wexford Intermediate Hurling Championship (2): 1973, 2026
- Wexford Junior Hurling Championship (4): 1935, 1946, 1972, 1980
- Wexford Minor Hurling Championship (1): 1979 (with Adamstown)
- Wexford Minor Football Championship (2): 1976 (with Adamstown), 1979 (with Adamstown)

== Notable players ==
- Tim Flood: All-Ireland SHC-winner (1955, 1956, 1960)
- Harry Kehoe: Leinster SHC-winner (2019)
- Larry Murphy: All-Ireland SHC-winner (1996).
