= Glynn–Barntown GAA =

Gaelic games club in County Wexford, Ireland

Glynn–Barntown
- An Gleann–Baile Bearna
- Founded: 1885
- County: Wexford
- Colours: Blue and green

Playing kits
Standard colours

Senior Club Championships
| | All Ireland | Leinster champions | Wexford champions |
|---|---|---|---|
| Hurling: | 0 | 0 | 0 |
| Camogie: | 0 | 0 | 1 |

Glynn–Barntown GAA is a Gaelic Athletic Association club located in the parishes of Glynn and Barntown in County Wexford, Ireland. The club fields teams in both hurling and Gaelic football.

== Honours ==
- Wexford Senior Football Championship: (1) 1996
- Wexford Senior Hurling B Championship: (3) 2006, 2007, 2008
- Wexford Intermediate Hurling Championship: (1) 1987
- Wexford Junior Hurling Championship: (1) 1976
- Wexford Intermediate Football Championship: (3) 1988, 2009, 2015
- Wexford Intermediate A Football Championship: (1) 2020
- Wexford Junior Football Championship: (2) 1982, 2019
- Wexford Under-21 Football Championship: (4) 1993, 2008, 2011, 2012
- Wexford Under-21 Hurling Championship: (3) 1993, 1994, 2010
- Wexford Under-21 Hurling Roinn 1: (3) 1990,2009,2024
- Wexford Minor Football Championship: (5) 1986, 2007, 2009, 2020, 2022
- Wexford Minor Hurling Championship: (6) Premier 1934 1939 2009, 2022, 2024, 2026.
- Wexford Minor Hurling Roinn 1: (2) 1989 2012
- Wexford Premier U16 Hurling Champiomship: (1) 2026
- Wexford Junior A Hurling Championship: (1) 2019
- Wexford Junior B Hurling Championship: (2) 1998, 2022
- Wexford Under-19 Football Championship: (1) 2022
- Jim Byrne Cup: (2) 2015,2023
- All Ireland Feile na nGael Hurling: U15 Michael Cusack Division 3 Cup Champions: (1) 2024

=== Camogie ===
- Wexford Senior Camogie Championship: (1) 2024
