= Rapparees Starlights GAA =

Gaelic sports club in County Wexford, Ireland

Rapparees Starlights
- Ropairí na Réaltsoilse
- Founded: 1972
- County: Wexford
- Colours: Red and Yellow
- Grounds: McCauley Park Bellefield
- Coordinates: 52°30′12″N 6°34′45″W

Playing kits
Standard colours

Senior Club Championships
	All Ireland	Leinster champions	Wexford champions
Football:	0	0	15
Hurling:	-	-	2

Rapparees Starlights GAA is a Gaelic Athletic Association club located in Enniscorthy, County Wexford, Ireland. The club fields teams in hurling as Rapparees and in Gaelic football as Starlights.

== History ==
The Rapparees Starlights club was founded in 1972, following an amalgamation between the existing St Aidan's and Shamrocks hurling clubs and the Starlights and Emmetts Gaelic football clubs. On 19 September 2021, they won their first Wexford senior hurling title since 1978 with a 6-18 to 1-17 win against St Anne's.

== Honours ==
- Wexford Senior Football Championship (5): 1983, 2002, 2004, 2017, 2020
  - As Starlights (6): 1927, 1828, 1929, 1933, 1936, 1937
  - As Rapparees (5): 1907, 1908, 1909, 1912, 1913
- Wexford Senior Hurling Championship: (2) 1978, 2021

== Notable players ==
- Adrian Fenlon
- Kevin Foley
- Christy Keogh
- Declan Ruth
- Liam Ryan
- Phil Wilson
