= Oulart–The Ballagh GAA =

Gaelic games club in County Wexford, Ireland

Oulart–The Ballagh
- Abhallort–An Bealach
- Founded: 1954
- County: Wexford
- Nickname: The Pikemen
- Colours
- Grounds: Oulart GAA Grounds
- Coordinates: 52°30′16″N 6°23′18″W

Playing kits
Home Kit	Change Kit

Senior Club Championships
	All Ireland	Leinster champions	Wexford champions
Hurling:	1	1	13
Camogie:	3	8	16

Oulart–The Ballagh GAA & Camogie Club is a Gaelic Athletic Association club located in Oulart, County Wexford, Ireland. The club is affiliated to the Wexford County Board and fields teams in hurling, Gaelic football and camogie.

== History ==
Located in the village of Oulart, about halfway between Gorey and Wexford, Oulart–The Ballagh GAA Club was founded in 1954 following an amalgamation between tw existing clubs in the parish. Prior to this, Gaelic games had been played in the area since the formative years of the Gaelic Athletic Association. A club known as Oulart Hill were runners-up in the first ever Wexford SHC final in 1888, while they also lost in 1908, 1911 and 1912. The Ballagh were runners-up in 1921.

Oulart–The Ballagh had its first notable success when, in 1967, the club won the Wexford JHC title. Senior status was secured the following year, when the Wexford IHC title was claimed. After five finals defeats, Oulart–The Ballagh made the breakthrough in 1994 to claim their inaugural Wexford SHC title, following a 1–14 to 0–16 win over St Martin's.

This title win began an unprecedented period of success, with the club winning 13 Wexford SHC titles between 1994 and 2016, including a record-setting five consecutive titles. Oulart–The Ballagh won the Leinster Club SHC title in 2015, after a 2–13 to 0–13 defeat of Cuala. In September 2021, the club's 36-year tenure in the Wexford SHC ended when they were relegated after losing a playoff to St Martin's. Oulart–The Ballagh made an immediate return to the top tier after winning the Wexford IHC title in 2022.

Oulart–The Ballagh's camogie section was established in the late 1970s. The club has dominated at county level, with 16 Wexford SCC titles being won between 2003 and 2025, as well as eight Leinster Club SCC titles. Oulart–The Ballagh has also won three All-Ireland Club SCC titles, after defeats of Drom & Inch (2012), Mullagh (2015) and Sarsfields (2021).

== Honours ==
- All-Ireland Senior Club Camogie Championship (3): 2012, 2015, 2021
- Leinster Senior Club Hurling Championship (1): 2015
- Leinster Senior Club Camogie Championship (8): 2009, 2010, 2011, 2012, 2014, 2015, 2020, 2021
- Wexford Senior Hurling Championship (13): 1994, 1995, 1997, 2004, 2005, 2007, 2009, 2010, 2011, 2012, 2013, 2015, 2016
- Wexford Senior Camogie Championship (16): 2003, 2004, 2005, 2006, 2007, 2009, 2010, 2011, 2012, 2014, 2015, 2016, 2020, 2021, 2022, 2025
- Wexford Intermediate Hurling Championship (2): 1968, 2022
- Wexford Junior Hurling Championship (2): 1967, 2005
- Wexford Under-21 Hurling Championship (7): 1965 (with Buffers Alley), 1966 (with Buffers Alley), 2001, 2003, 2004, 2006, 2013
- Wexford Minor Hurling Championship (6): 1967 (with Buffers Alley), 1999, 2002, 2003, 2005, 2015

== Notable players ==
- Liam Dunne: All-Ireland SHC-winner (1996)
- Christy Jacob: All-Ireland SHC-winner (1968)
- Mick Jacob: All-Ireland SHC-winner (1968)
- Martin Storey: All-Ireland SHC-winner (1996)
