= Faythe Harriers GAA =

Gaelic games club in County Wexford, Ireland

Faythe Harriers
- Madraí Giorria Fhaiche
- Founded: 1949
- County: Wexford
- Nickname: The Harriers
- Colours: Purple & Gold
- Grounds: Páirc Carman/Wexford Park
- Coordinates: 52°19′57.36″N 6°28′33.28″W

Playing kits
Standard colours

Senior Club Championships
	All Ireland	Leinster champions	Wexford champions
Football:	-	-	2
Hurling:	0	0	5
Camogie:	-	-	2

Faythe Harriers is a Gaelic Athletic Association club located in Wexford town, Ireland.

== History ==
The history of the Faythe Harriers club dates to the early 1940s, although the hurling club wasn't formed until 1949. In the late 1930s, the Mulgannon Harriers club represented the south end of Wexford town before it was disbanded.

In 1941, when a football street league was started in Wexford, a number of local people approached the members of the Mulgannon Harriers committee for a loan of jerseys and equipment. Their request was accepted on the condition that the new team would use another name. The name "Faythe Harriers" was selected. Both clubs only played football, as hurling wasn't played much in Wexford town at the time. The new Faythe Harriers club played in the street league in 1941. The following two years, the club played in the Junior Football Championship. 1943 saw the first county title coming to the club.

For the next few years, the club struggled. Then, in 1949, a novice street league was started in football and hurling. Once again the name Faythe Harriers re-emerged. Not only did they participate in football, but for the first time they entered a hurling team. The club went on to win the hurling league. The Faythe Harriers had arrived.

During the 1960s, the Harriers dominated club hurling in Wexford at juvenile, Minor and Under-21 level. While the club won their third Senior title in 1965, they had to wait until 1981 for their next title.

At underage level, the club won two County Premier Juvenile titles and two Premier Minor titles. The teams behind these underage titles were the backbone of the Senior title win in 2001.

In 2016, the Faythe Harriers U'14 hurling team won the Division 1 Féile na nGael hurling championship in Tipperary. It was the first time a Wexford team had taken top honours at the competition since 2001.

== Notable players ==
- Lee Chin
- Richie Kehoe
- Larry O'Gorman
- Stephen Nolan
- Ned Buggy
- Jim Berry

== Honours ==
- Wexford Senior Hurling Championship (5): 1960, 1962, 1965, 1981, 2001
- Wexford Intermediate Hurling Championship (1): 1956
- Wexford Under-21 Hurling Championship (7): 1967, 1968, 1969, 1987, 1988, 2012 , 2023
- Wexford Minor Hurling Championship (15): 1951, 1952, 1953, 1954, 1955, 1956, 1966, 1968, 1969, 1970, 1971, 1972, 1986, 1998, 2000, 2018, 2019
