= 2026 Wexford Senior Football Championship =

129th Wexford Senior Football Championship

Tournament details
- County: Wexford
- Province: Leinster
- Year: 2026
- Sponsor: Dominic Smith Electrical
- Date: 10 July - 18 October 2026
- Teams: 12
- Defending champions: Castletown Liam Mellows

Winners
- Champions: Kilanerin–Ballyfad (8th win)
- Manager: Padraig Murphy
- Captain: Páraic Hughes

Runners-up
- Runners-up: St Martin's

Promotion/Relegation
- Relegated team(s): Glynn–Barntown

Other
- Matches played: 38
- Website: Wexford GAA

The 2026 Wexford Senior Football Championship is the 129th edition of Wexford GAA's premier club Gaelic football tournament for senior graded teams in County Wexford, Ireland. The tournament consists of 12 teams, with the winner going on to represent Wexford in the Leinster Senior Club Football Championship. The championship starts with a group-stage and progresses to a knock-out stage.

Castletown Liam Mellows are the defending champions after defeating Shelmaliers in the final to win their 14th championship and 2nd in a row.

St Martin's returned to the senior grade after winning the 2025 Wexford Intermediate Football Championship against Ballyhogue. Starlights replaced them in the I.F.C after losing to Fethard St Mogue's in the relegation play-off.

The draw for the group stage of the championship took place on 7 February 2026.

== Team Changes ==
The following teams have changed division since the 2025 championship season:

=== To S.F.C. ===
Promoted from 2025 I.F.C.

- St Martin's - (Intermediate Champions)

=== From S.F.C. ===
Relegated to 2026 I.F.C.

- Starlights

== Participating teams ==
The teams that are competing in the 2026 Wexford S.F.C are:

Club	Location	Manager(s)	2025 Championship Position	2026 Championship Position	Championship Titles (Pre 2026)	Last Championship Title (Pre 2026)
Castletown Liam Mellows	Castletown		Champions	Semi-Finalist	14	2025
Crossbeg–Ballymurn	Crossabeg & Ballymurn		Quarter-finalist	Quarter-Finalist	0	—
Fethard St Mogue's	Fethard-on-Sea		Relegation finalist	Quarter-Finalist	1	1998
Glynn–Barntown	Glynn & Barntown		Quarter-finalist	Relegated to IFC	1	1996
Gusserane O'Rahilly's	Ballycullane		Semi-finalist	Quarter-Finalist	6	2016
HWH–Bunclody	Bunclody		Quarter-finalist	Relegation Finalist	2	1985
Kilanerin–Ballyfad	Killinierin		Semi-finalist	Champions	7	2008
Naomh Éanna	Gorey		Quarter-finalist	Non-Qualifier	0	—
Sarsfields	Wexford		Non-qualifier	Quarter-Finalist	5	1984
Shelmaliers	Castlebridge		Runners-Up	Semi-Finalist	3	2023
St James	Ramsgrange		Non-qualifier	Non-qualifier	1	2015
St Martin's	Piercestown		I.F.C Champions	Runners-Up	1	2013

== Group-Stage ==
There are 2 groups called Group A and Group B. The top 4 in each group qualify for the quarter-finals. The bottom finisher in each group will contest each other in a relegation play-off.

=== Group A ===
Advance to knockout stage Advance to relegation play-off

Team	Matches				Score			Pts
Team	Pld	W	D	L	For	Against	Diff	Pts
Castletown Liam Mellows	5	4	0	1	119	49	+70	8
Kilanerin–Ballyfad	5	4	0	1	105	88	+17	8
St Martin's	5	3	0	2	78	83	-5	6
Sarsfields	5	2	0	3	56	102	-46	4
Naomh Éanna	5	2	0	3	92	82	+10	4
HWH–Bunclody	5	0	0	5	56	102	-46	0

==== Round 1 ====
10 July 2026 Round 1	Castletown Liam Mellows	0-18 (18) – (20) 2-14	Naomh Éanna	Monamolin
19:30 IST (UTC+1)		(HT: 0-06 – 2-08)
	Pts: Darragh Brooks 0-6 (2tpf, 2'45), Jonathan Bealin 0-4 (4f), Robbie Brooks 0-3, Ross Cody 0-1, Colin Kennedy 0-1, Rory Heffernan 0-1, Liam Coleman 0-1, Brendan Halpin 0-1	Report	Pts: Dylan Cooke-Leonard 0-7 (1tp, 2f), Tom Funge 2-0, Ruairí Martin 0-3 (1f), Charlie McGuckin 0-2, Cathal Stokes 0-1, Rory Turbitt 0-1 (f)	Referee: James Owens (Kilrush)

11 July 2026 Round 1	Kilanerin–Ballyfad	0-17 (17) – (14) 1-11	St Martin's	Enniscorthy
14:00 IST (UTC+1)		(HT: 0-11 – 0-07)		Venue: McCauley Park Bellefield
	Pts: Seán Hughes 0-8 (3tpf, 1f), Niall Hughes 0-3 (1tp), Páraic Hughes 0-2, Dean O'Toole 0-1, Jack Gethings 0-1, Jamie Hughes 0-1, Eoin Hughes 0-1	Report	Pts: Oisín Waters 1-1 (1f), Ben Maddock 0-2 (tp), Kyle Firman 0-2, Joe Barrett 0-2, Darren Codd 0-2, Aaron Maddock 0-1, Jake Firman 0-1	Referee: Brendan Holohan (Rathgarogue Cushinstown)

11 July 2026 Round 1	Sarsfields	2-12 (18) – (13) 1-10	HWH–Bunclody	Bree
15:00 IST (UTC+1)		(HT: 0-07 – 1-03)
	Pts: Luke Murphy 1-3, Eoin Roche 1-1, Eoin Halligan 0-3 (1tpf, 1'45), Ryan Furlong 0-2 (tp), Andrew Harrington 0-2 (2f), Dammy Walsh 0-1	Report	Pts: Darragh Farrell 1-4 (1tp), Aidan Nolan 0-5 (3f, 1tpf), Jamie John Murphy 0-1 (f)	Referee: James Heavey (St James)

==== Round 2 ====
17 July 2026 Round 2	Naomh Éanna	0-11 (11) – (13) 1-10	Sarsfields	Enniscorthy
19:30 IST (UTC+1)		(HT: 0-07 – 0-06)		Venue: McCauley Park Bellefield
	Pts: Dylan Cooke-Leonard 0-3 (1tpf), Charlie McGuckin 0-3 (1tp), Ruarí Martin 0-2 (1f), Darragh Levingston 0-2, Cian Kenny 0-1	Report	Pts: Andrew Harrington 0-6 (5f), Luke Murphy 1-1, Dylan Furlong 0-1, Josh Shiel 0-1, Danny Walsh 0-1	Referee: John O'Loughlin (Monageer Boolavogue)

18 July 2026 Round 2	HWH–Bunclody	4-06 (18) – (20) 3-11	Kilanerin–Ballyfad	Enniscorthy
14:00 IST (UTC+1)		(HT: 1-03 – 3-03)		Venue: McCauley Park Bellefield
	Pts: Ciarán Regan 2-2 (1tp), Jamie John Murphy 1-3 (2f), Edward Dunbar 1-1	Report	Pts: Páraic Hughes 1-4, Pádraig Jones 1-1, Jack Gethings 1-0, Seán Hughes 0-2 (1f), Mikey Hughes 0-1, Tom Mordaunt 0-1, Darragh Forde 0-1, Darragh Gethings 0-1	Referee: Stephen Burke (Volunteers)

18 July 2026 Round 2	Castletown Liam Mellows	3-24 (33) – (6) 1-03	St Martin's	Enniscorthy
15:30 IST (UTC+1)		(HT: 3-13 – 1-00)		Venue: McCauley Park Bellefield
	Pts: Robbie Brooks 2-3, Darragh Brooks 0-7 (3tpf, 1f), Gavin Kelly 1-0, Michael Kavanagh 0-3, Jonathan Bealin 0-3 (1f), Conor Carty 0-2 (tp), Doran Daly-O'Toole 0-2, Gavin McNulty 0-1, Rory Heffernan 0-1, Brendan Halpin 0-1 (f), Joe Gardiner 0-1	Report	Pts: Aaron Maddock 1-0, Sam Audsley 0-1, Oisín Waters 0-1 (f), Kyle Firman 0-1	Referee: Barry Redmond (Na Fianna)

==== Round 3 ====
8 August 2026 Round 3	HWH–Bunclody	0-08 (8) – (20) 1-17	St Martin's	Enniscorthy
14:00 IST (UTC+1)		(HT: 0-03 – 1-09)		Venue: McCauley Park Bellefield
	Pts: Jamie John Murphy 0-4 (4f), Aidan Nolan 0-2 (tp), Darragh Farrell 0-1, John Dunne 0-1	Report	Pts: Jake Firman 1-6 (1tp, 2f), Kyle Firman 0-4, Darren Codd 0-4 (2f), Aaron Maddock 0-1, Luke Kavanagh 0-1, Daithí Waters 0-1	Referee: Ger Cullen (Ballyhogue)

8 August 2026 Round 3	Castletown Liam Mellows	2-18 (24) – (5) 0-05	Sarsfields	Enniscorthy
15:45 IST (UTC+1)		(HT: 0-09 – 0-04)		Venue: McCauley Park Bellefield
	Pts: Jonathan Bealin 0-8 (3f, 1tp), Robbie Brooks 0-5, Michael Kavanagh 1-1, Darragh Brooks 1-1 (1pen, 1'45), Rory Heffernan 0-1, Gavin Kelly 0-1, Brendan Halpin 0-1	Report	Pts: Ryan Furlong 0-2, Andrew Harrington 0-1 (f), Luke Murphy 0-1	Referee: Eamonn Furlong (Starlights)

8 August 2026 Round 3	Naomh Éanna	2-10 (16) – (22) 3-13	Kilanerin–Ballyfad	Monamolin
18:30 IST (UTC+1)		(HT: 2-04 – 1-06)
	Pts: Dylan Cooke-Leonard 1-2 (1pen), Charlie McGuckin 1-0, Rian Fitzpatrick 0-3 (1tp, 1f), Cian Brown 0-2 (tp), Luke Darley 0-1, Eoin McGuckin 0-1, Jack Doran 0-1	Report	Pts: Cian Hughes 1-1, Jack Gethings 1-1, Dean O'Toole 0-4 (2f), Paddy D'Arcy 1-0, Seán Hughes 0-2 (2f), Eoin Hughes 0-2, Micheál McGonigle 0-2, Darragh Forde 0-1	Referee: James Owens (Kilrush)

==== Round 4 ====
14 August 2026 Round 4	Castletown Liam Mellows	0-16 (16) – (6) 0-06	HWH–Bunclody	Enniscorthy
19:30 IST (UTC+1)		(HT: 0-10 – 0-03)		Venue: McCauley Park Bellefield
	Pts: Darragh Brooks 0-6 (2tpf, 2'45), Robbie Brooks 0-2, Brendan Halpin 0-2, Jonathan Bealin 0-2, Colin Kennedy 0-1, Gavin McNulty 0-1, Michael Kavanagh 0-1, Conor Carty 0-1	Report	Pts: Jamie John Murphy 0-4 (1tp), James Rothwell 0-1, Oisín Regan 0-1	Referee: Eamonn Furlong (Starlights)

15 August 2026 Round 4	Naomh Éanna	1-14 (17) – (18) 1-15	St Martin's	Enniscorthy
15:00 IST (UTC+1)		(HT: 1-06 – 0-07)		Venue: McCauley Park Bellefield
	Pts: Jack Doran 0-5 (2tp), Charlie McGuckin 1-2 (1tpf), Ruairí Martin 0-4 (3f), Darragh Levingston 0-2 (tp), Rian Fitzpatrick 0-1	Report	Pts: Darren Codd 1-4 (1pen, 2f), Kyle Firman 0-3, Oisín Waters 0-2 (1f), Diarmuid O'Leary 0-1, Zac Firman 0-1, Aaron Maddock 0-1, Ben Maddock 0-1, Joe Barrett 0-1, Luke Kavanagh 0-1	Referee: Adrian Harris (Oylegate–Glenbrien)

15 August 2026 Round 4	Sarsfields	2-06 (12) – (34) 2-28	Kilanerin–Ballyfad	Enniscorthy
16:45 IST (UTC+1)		(HT: 2-01 – 1-19)		Venue: McCauley Park Bellefield
	Pts: Darby Purcell 1-1 (1f), Conor Kehoe 1-0, Luke Murphy 0-2, Richie Lawlor 0-2, Danny Walsh 0-1	Report	Pts: Seán Forde 0-8 (2tpf, 1tp, 1f), Micheál McGonigle 1-4, Dean O'Toole 0-6 (2tp), Cian Hughes 1-2, Páraic Hughes 0-3 (1tp), Conor Jones 0-1, Pádraig Jones 0-1, Eoin Hughes 0-1, Darragh Forde 0-1, Seán Hughes 0-1	Referee: Eamonn Furlong (Starlights)

==== Round 5 ====
6 September 2026 Round 5	Sarsfields	0-08 (8) – (20) 2-14	St Martin's	Wexford
17:00 IST (UTC+1)		(HT: 0-05 – 1-06)		Venue: Chadwicks Wexford Park
	Pts: Conor Kehoe 0-3 (2f), Ryan Furlong 0-1, Luke Murphy 0-1, Eoin Roche 0-1, Dylan Furlong 0-1, Danny Walsh 0-1	Report	Pts: Barry O'Connor 0-6 (3f, 1tpf), Oisín Waters 1-1, Sam Audsley 1-0, Darren Codd 0-3 (1'45, 1f), Daithí Waters 0-2, Kyle Firman 0-1, Jake Firman 0-1 (f)	Referee: Brendan Holohan (Rathgarogue Cushinstown)

6 September 2026 Round 5	Castletown Liam Mellows	3-19 (28) – (12) 0-12	Kilanerin–Ballyfad	Enniscorthy
17:00 IST (UTC+1)		(HT: 2-06 – 0-04)		Venue: McCauley Park Bellefield
	Pts: Jonathan Bealin 0-7 (3f, 1tp), Robbie Brooks 1-3, Darragh Brooks 0-4 (1tpf, 1f, 1'45), Michael Kavanagh 0-4 (1tp), Ross Cody 1-0, Brendan Halpin 1-0, Conor Carty 0-1	Report	Pts: Seán Hughes 0-5 (1tpf, 2f), Micheál McGonigle 0-3, Dean O'Toole 0-2, Páraic Hughes 0-1, Conor Devitt 0-1	Referee: Stephen Burke (Volunteers)

6 September 2026 Round 5	Naomh Éanna	3-19 (28) – (11) 1-08	HWH–Bunclody	Enniscorthy
17:00 IST (UTC+1)		(HT: 2-07 – 1-06)		Venue: St Patrick's Park
	Pts: Rian Fitzpatrick 1-5 (1tpf, 2f), Darragh Levingston 1-2 (1f), Eoin McGuckin 1-1, Tom Funge 0-4 (1tp), Charlie McGuckin 0-3 (1tp), Seamus O'Donnell 0-1, Brian Cushe 0-1, Cathal Stokes 0-1, Cian Browne 0-1	Report	Pts: Jamie John Murphy 1-1, Martin O'Connor 0-2 (tp), Derry Mahon 0-2 (tp), Aidan Nolan 0-1 (f), Cathal Doyle 0-1, Cathal Dunbar 0-1	Referee: Kevin Kehoe (Our Lady's Island)

=== Group B ===
Advance to knockout stage Advance to relegation play-off

Team	Matches				Score			Pts
Team	Pld	W	D	L	For	Against	Diff	Pts
Shelmaliers	5	3	1	1	97	82	+15	7
Gusserane O'Rahilly's	5	3	0	2	111	87	+24	6
Fethard St Mogue's	5	3	0	2	93	87	+6	6
Crossbeg–Ballymurn	5	2	1	2	72	90	-18	5
St James	5	1	2	2	83	93	-10	4
Glynn–Barntown	5	1	0	4	62	79	-17	2

==== Round 1 ====
10 July 2025 Round 1	Gusserane O'Rahilly's	2-11 (17) – (18) 2-12	St James	New Ross
19:30 IST (UTC+1)		(HT: 0-05 – 0-09)		Venue: O'Kennedy Park
	Pts: Gavin Sheehan 2-0, Mark Rossiter 0-4 (1f), Páraic Conway 0-3 (1tp), Mark O'Neill 0-2 (tp), Seán Ryan 0-1, Eoin Ryan 0-1	Report	Pts: Josh Doyle-Delaney 0-5 (3f, 1tpf), Alan Walsh 1-1, Paul Walsh 1-0, Colum Fitzgerald 0-3 (1tp), Tommy Walsh 0-2 (tp), Ciarán McPhillips 0-1	Referee: Brendan Martin (Ballyhogue)

11 July 2025 Round 1	Fethard St Mogue's	1-12 (15) – (12) 0-12	Glynn–Barntown	Clongeen
15:00 IST (UTC+1)		(HT: 1-02 – 0-05)
	Pts: Richie Waters 0-4 (2tpf), John Turbitt 0-4 (1f), Garrett Foley 1-0, Cian Byrne 0-3 (1tp), Ciarán Dwyer 0-1	Report	Pts: Liam Donoghue 0-6 (3f, 1tpf), Connor Mackey 0-1, Shane Donovan 0-1, Rian Bracken 0-1, Colin Carley 0-1, Callum McDonald 0-1, Aaron Breen 0-1	Referee: James Murray (St Mary's)

11 July 2025 Round 1	Shelmaliers	2-17 (23) – (15) 1-12	Crossabeg–Ballymurn	Enniscorthy
15:30 IST (UTC+1)		(HT: 1-10 – 1-04)		Venue: McCauley Park Bellefield
	Pts: Eoghan Nolan 0-8 (4f, 2tp), Páraic O'Leary 1-1, Ross Banville 1-0, Glen Malone 0-3, Aidan Cash 0-2 (tp), Robbie Delaney 0-1, Brian Malone 0-1, Conor Hearne 0-1	Report	Pts: Mark Byrne 0-4 (1tp, 2f), Conor Devereux 1-0, Ben Turner 0-2 (tpf), Jack Fortune 0-1, Bill Eviston 0-1, James Dixon 0-1, Paddy Devereux 0-1, Conor Bernard 0-1, David McCarthy 0-1 (f)	Referee: Gearóid McGrath (St James)

==== Round 2 ====
18 July 2025 Round 2	Glynn–Barntown	1-11 (14) – (21) 3-12	Gusserane O'Rahilly's	New Ross
18:00 IST (UTC+1)		(HT: 0-10 – 2-04)		Venue: O'Kennedy Park
	Pts: Liam Donoghue 0-6 (1tpf, 1f), Aaron Nolan 1-1, Cormac Cooney 0-2 (2f), Aaron Breen 0-1, Rob Tierney 0-1	Report	Pts: Páraic Conway 1-3 (1tp), Mark Rossiter 0-4 (1tpf, 2f), Cormac Kiely 1-0, Gavin Sheehan 1-0, Seán Ryan 0-3 (1tp), Mark O'Neill 0-1, Darren Rossiter 0-1	Referee: Jamie Farrell (HWH–Bunclody)

18 July 2025 Round 2	Shelmaliers	0-19 (19) – (19) 1-16	St James	Taghmon
19:00 IST (UTC+1)		(HT: 0-08 – 0-10)
	Pts: Eoghan Nolan 0-5 (4f), Aidan Cash 0-4 (2tp), Robbie Delaney 0-3, Conor Hearne 0-3, Jody Donohoe 0-1, Brian Malone 0-1, Joe O'Leary 0-1	Report	Pts: Colum Fitzgerald 1-3, Josh Doyle-Delaney 0-6 (3f, 1tpf), Jason Barron 0-1, Darragh Lyons 0-1, Ciarán McPhillips 0-1, Paul Walsh 0-1, Alan Walsh 0-1, Tomás Barron 0-1, Kevin O'Grady 0-1	Referee: Kevin Kehoe (Our Lady's Island)

18 July 2025 Round 2	Crossabeg–Ballymurn	2-08 (14) – (10) 0-10	Fethard St Mogue's	New Ross
19:30 IST (UTC+1)		(HT: 0-06 – 0-07)		Venue: O'Kennedy Park
	Pts: Mark Byrne 0-6 (2tp, 1f), Cian Kinlough 1-0, Pádraig Foley 1-0, David McCarthy 0-1, Conor Devereux 0-1	Report	Pts: Richie Waters 0-3 (1tpf), John Turbitt 0-3 (1f), Cillian Byrne 0-2, Cian Byrne 0-1, Eoin Whelan 0-1	Referee: Ger Cullen (Ballyhogue)

==== Round 3 ====
7 August 2026 Round 3	Crossabeg–Ballymurn	2-06 (12) – (28) 5-13	Gusserane O'Rahilly's	Wexford
19:30 IST (UTC+1)		(HT: 1-06 – 3-05)		Venue: Chadwicks Wexford Park
	Pts: Mark Byrne 0-4 (2f, 1tp), Cian Kinlough 1-0, Shane Cullen 1-0, Ben Turner 0-2 (2'45),	Report	Pts: Mark Rossiter 2-5 (1pen, 2f, 1tp), Gavin Sheehan 2-0, Darren Rossiter 1-0, Eoin Ryan 0-3, Páraic Conway 0-2, Adrian Redmond 0-1, Mark O'Neill 0-1, Seán Ryan 0-1	Referee: Stephen Burke (Volunteers)

8 August 2026 Round 3	Glynn–Barntown	0-16 (16) – (13) 2-07	St James	New Ross
14:00 IST (UTC+1)		(HT: 0-10 – 1-02)		Venue: O'Kennedy Park
	Pts: Cormac Cooney 0-6 (1tpf, 1tp), Colin Carley 0-2 (tp), Liam Donoghue 0-2 (1f), Michael Mackey 0-2, Conor Mackey 0-1, Darragh Carley 0-1, Aaron Nolan 0-1, Aaron Breen 0-1	Report	Pts: Alan Walsh 1-3 (1tp), Tommy Walsh 1-0, Kevin O'Grady 0-2 (tp), Ronan Shannon 0-1, Josh Doyle-Delaney 0-1	Referee: Brendan Holohan (Rathgarogue Cushinstown)

9 August 2026 Round 3	Shelmaliers	2-13 (19) – (21) 2-15	Fethard St Mogue's	Wexford
15:45 IST (UTC+1)		(HT: 1-05 – 1-12)		Venue: Chadwicks Wexford Park
	Pts: Eoghan Nolan 0-7 (3tpf, 1f), Conor Hearne 1-0, Seán Keane-Carroll 1-0, Graham Staples 0-2, Glen Malone 0-1, Paul Hearne 0-1, Brian Malone 0-1, Robbie Delaney 0-1	Report	Pts: Richie Waters 2-4 (2'45, 1tpf), John Turbitt 0-6 (2f, 1tp), Garrett Foley 0-2 (tp), Eoin Whelan 0-2, Jack Colfer 0-1,	Referee: Gearóid McGrath (St James)

==== Round 4 ====
15 August 2026 Round 4	Fethard St Mogue's	2-17 (23) – (26) 3-17	Gusserane O'Rahilly's	New Ross
15:45 IST (UTC+1)		(HT: 0-05 – 1-11)		Venue: O'Kennedy Park
	Pts: Cian Byrne 1-2, Richie Waters 0-5 (2tpf), Eoin Whelan 0-4, John Turbitt 0-4 (1f), Morgan Ellis 1-0, Garrett Foley 0-1, Jake Molloy 0-1	Report	Pts: Mark Rossiter 1-4 (1pen), Seán Ryan 1-3, Gavin Sheehan 1-1, Páraic Conway 0-3, Jack Burford 0-3 (1tpf), Mark O'Neill 0-1, Graeme Cullen 0-1, Sam Wall 0-1	Referee: Stephen Burke (Volunteers)

16 August 2026 Round 4	Shelmaliers	2-10 (16) – (8) 1-05	Glynn–Barntown	Wexford
14:00 IST (UTC+1)		(HT: 2-04 – 0-03)		Venue: Chadwicks Wexford Park
	Pts: Eoghan Nolan 0-4 (1tpf), Aidan Cash 1-0, Conor Hearne 1-0, Jody Donohoe 0-2, Ross Banville 0-1, Graham Staples 0-1, Robbie Delaney 0-1, Glen Malone 0-1	Report	Pts: Matthew Joyce 1-0, Colin Carley 0-2 (tp), Darragh Carley 0-1, Liam Donoghue 0-1 ('45), Aaron Nolan 0-1	Referee: James Murray (St Mary's)

16 August 2026 Round 4	Crossabeg–Ballymurn	1-14 (17) – (17) 2-11	St James	Wexford
15:45 IST (UTC+1)		(HT: 1-09 – 0-05)		Venue: Chadwicks Wexford Park
	Pts: Mark Byrne 0-5 (2f), Pádraig Foley 1-1 (1f), David McCarthy 0-3, Conor Devereux 0-3, Cian Kinlough 0-1, Paddy Devereux 0-1	Report	Pts: Josh Doyle-Delaney 0-4 (1tpf, 1f), Tomás Barron 1-0, Darragh Lyons 1-0, Alan Walsh 0-3 (1tp), Tommy Walsh 0-3, Ronan Shannon 0-1	Referee: Ger Cullen (Ballyhogue)

==== Round 5 ====
6 September 2026 Round 5	Crossabeg–Ballymurn	1-11 (14) – (12) 1-09	Glynn–Barntown	Wexford
15:15 IST (UTC+1)		(HT: 0-04 – 0-06)		Venue: Chadwicks Wexford Park
	Pts: Mark Byrne 0-9 (3tpf, 2f, 1'45), Oisín Foley 1-0, Ben Turner 0-1 (f), Paddy Devereux 0-1	Report	Pts: Cormac Cooney 1-1 (1pen, 1f), Connor Mackey 0-4 (1tp), Jamie Crean 0-2 (tp), Michael Mackey 0-2 (1f)	Referee: Gearóid McGrath (St James)

6 September 2026 Round 5	Fethard St Mogue's	2-18 (24) – (16) 2-10	St James	New Ross
15:15 IST (UTC+1)		(HT: 0-14 – 0-05)		Venue: O'Kennedy Park
	Pts: Richie Waters 1-5 (1pen, 2tpf, 1'45), Eoin Whelan 0-4 (2tpf), Jake Molloy 1-0, Cian Byrne 0-3 (1tp), John Turbitt 0-2 (1f), Garrett Foley 0-2 (tp), Jack Coffer 0-1, Morgen Ellis 0-1	Report	Pts: Josh Doyle-Delaney 0-9 (2tpf, 4f), Tomás Barren 1-1 (1f), Tommy Walsh 1-0	Referee: Brendan Martin (Ballyhogue)

6 September 2026 Round 5	Shelmaliers	3-11 (20) – (19) 2-13	Gusserane O'Rahilly's	Enniscorthy
15:15 IST (UTC+1)		(HT: 2-10 – 2-07)		Venue: McCauley Park Bellefield
	Pts: Jody Donohoe 1-2 (1tp), Eoghan Nolan 0-5 (2tp, 1f), Simon Donohoe 1-0, Aidan Cash 1-0, Conor Hearne 0-2 (tp), Glen Malone 0-1 (f), Aaron Murphy 0-1	Report	Pts: Mark Rossiter 0-8 (3f, 1tp, 1tpf), Darren Rossiter 1-1, Páraic Conway 1-0, Mark O'Neill 0-2, Jack Burford 0-1, Seán Ryan 0-1	Referee: James Owens (Kilrush)

== Knockout-Stage ==
The top 4 teams from each qualify for the quarter-finals with 1st vs 4th and 2nd vs 3rd in each case.

=== Bracket ===
Quarter-finals
19 September, Wexford
Kilanerin–Ballyfad	0-19
Fethard St Mogue's	0-14
20 September, Wexford
Shelmaliers	3-17
Sarsfields	0-07
19 September, Wexford
Gusserane O'Rahilly's	2-13
St Martin's	0-20
20 September, Wexford
Castletown Liam Mellows	2-13
Crossabeg–Ballymurn	0-10

Semi-finals
4 October, Wexford
Kilanerin–Ballyfad	2-12
Shelmaliers	0-17
4 October, Wexford
St Martin's	4-12
Castletown Liam Mellows	1-16

Final
18 October, Wexford
Kilanerin–Ballyfad
St Martin's

=== Relegation Play-off ===
The bottom finisher in both groups play-off in a relegation final. The loser is relegated to the 2027 Wexford Intermediate Football Championship

2 October 2026 Relegation Play-off	HWH–Bunclody	1-15 (18) – (18) 1-15 (a.e.t.)	Glynn–Barntown	Wexford
19:30 IST (UTC+1)		(HT: 1-04 – 0-10) (FT: 1-11 – 1-11)		Venue: Chadwicks Wexford Park
	Pts: Aidan Nolan 0-6 (2tpf, 1'45, 1f), James Rothwell 1-0, Darragh Farrell 0-3, Ben Martin 0-2, Ciarán Regan 0-2 (tp), Jamie John Murphy 0-1, Cathal Doyle 0-1	Report	Pts: Aaron Breen 1-6 (2tpf, 1'45, 1f), Rob Tierney 0-4 (2tp), James Stafford 0-1, Michael Mackey 0-1, Callum McDonald 0-1, Rory Goff 0-1, Conor Mahoney 0-1	Referee: Kevin Kehoe (Our Lady's Island)

==== Replay ====
16 October 2026 Relegation Play-off Replay	HWH–Bunclody	2-08 (14) – (12) 1-09	Glynn–Barntown	Enniscorthy
19:30 IST (UTC+1)				Venue: McCauley Park Bellefield

=== Quarter-Finals ===
19 September 2026 Quarter-Finals	Kilanerin–Ballyfad	0-19 (19) – (14) 0-14	Fethard St Mogue's	Wexford
17:30 IST (UTC+1)		(HT: 0-10 – 0-06)		Venue: Chadwicks Wexford Park
	Pts: Dean O'Toole 0-6 (3f), Páraic Hughes 0-3, Cian Hughes 0-3, Seán Hughes 0-2 (tp), Micheál McGonigle 0-2, Mikey Hughes 0-1, Eoin Hughes 0-1, Conor Kinsella 0-1	Report	Pts: John Turbitt 0-7 (1tp, 1f), Eoin Whelan 0-2 (1f), Seán Nunan 0-1, Graham O'Grady 0-1, Pádraic Gleeson 0-1, Richie Waters 0-1, Adam Swan 0-1	Referee: Stephen Burke (Volunteers)

19 September 2026 Quarter-Finals	Gusserane O'Rahilly's	2-13 (19) – (20) 0-20	St Martin's	Wexford
19:15 IST (UTC+1)		(HT: 1-08 – 0-08)		Venue: Chadwicks Wexford Park
	Pts: Mark Rossiter 2-5 (1pen, 3f, 1tp), Mark O'Neill 0-3, Seán Ryan 0-2, Darren Rossiter 0-2, John Roche 0-1	Report	Pts: Barry O'Connor 0-9 (2tp, 2tpf), Jake Firman 0-5 (2f), Kyle Firman 0-3, Michael Codd 0-1, Aaron Maddock 0-1, Luke Kavanagh 0-1	Referee: Eamonn Furlong (Starlights)

20 September 2026 Quarter-Finals	Castletown Liam Mellows	2-13 (19) – (10) 0-10	Crossabeg–Ballymurn	Wexford
15:00 IST (UTC+1)		(HT: 1-07 – 0-06)		Venue: Chadwicks Wexford Park
	Pts: Jack Higgins 1-3, Jonathan Bealin 0-6 (1tp, 2f), Doran Daly-O'Toole 1-0, Brendan Halpin 0-2, Michael Kavanagh 0-1, Robbie Brooks 0-1	Report	Pts: Mark Byrne 0-4 (1tpf, 1tp), Paddy Devereux 0-3, Oisín Foley 0-3 (1tp)	Referee: James Heavey (St James)

20 September 2026 Quarter-Finals	Shelmaliers	3-17 (26) – (7) 0-07	Sarsfields	Wexford
16:45 IST (UTC+1)		(HT: 2-10 – 0-02)		Venue: Chadwicks Wexford Park
	Pts: Jody Donohoe 1-5 (1tpf), Craig McCabe 0-5 (2tpf, 1f), Aaron Murphy 1-1, Graham Staples 1-0, Eoghan Nolan 0-2 (tpf), Paul Hearne 0-1, Brian Malone 0-1, Páraic O'Leary 0-1, Joe O'Leary 0-1	Report	Pts: Andrew Harrington 0-4 (2tp), Luke Murphy 0-2 (tp), Conor Kehoe 0-1,	Referee: Jamie Farrell (HWH–Bunclody)

=== Semi-Finals ===
4 October 2026 Semi-Finals	Castletown Liam Mellows	1-16 (19) – (24) 4-12	St Martin's	Wexford
15:00 IST (UTC+1)		(HT: 0-07 – 0-06)		Venue: Chadwicks Wexford Park
	Pts: Jonathan Bealin 1-10 (1-2f, 3tpf, 1tp), Darragh Brooks 0-3 (1tpf, 1f), Rory Heffernan 0-1, Jack Higgins 0-1, Robbie Brooks 0-1	Report	Pts: Luke Kavanagh 1-6 (2tp), Ben Maddock 1-2 (1tp), Jake Firman 1-2 (1pen, 1f), Joe Barrett 1-0, Barry O'Connor 0-1 (f), Aaron Maddock 0-1	Referee: James Owens (Kilrush)

4 October 2026 Semi-Finals	Shelmaliers	0-17 (17) – (18) 2-12	Kilanerin–Ballyfad	Wexford
16:45 IST (UTC+1)				Venue: Chadwicks Wexford Park
	Pts: Eoghan Nolan 0-9 (3tp, 3f), Craig McCabe 0-4 (2f, 1tpf), Simon Donohoe 0-2, Jody Donohoe 0-1, Eoghan O'Gara 0-1	Report	Pts: Cian Hughes 1-2, Dean O'Toole 0-4 (2f, 1tpf), Pádraig Jones 1-0, Micheál McGonigle 0-3, Conor Devitt 0-1, Mikey Hughes 0-1, Niall Hughes 0-1	Referee: Brendan Holohan (Rathgarogue Cushinstown)

=== Final ===
After winning the IFC the previous year, St Martin's entered their first SFC final since 2017, and were hoping to win their first title since 2013.

Kilanerin–Ballyfad came into their first final since 2018, and were looking to win their first title since 2008.

St Martin's and Kilanerin had never played against each other in a senior final before this game.

Kilanerin were 8/11 favourites, while St Martin's were 5/4 underdogs.

18 October 2026
15:30 IST (UTC+1)
Final

Report

St Martin's	0-12 (12) – (18) 1-15	Kilanerin–Ballyfad
(HT: 0-05 – 0-05)
Pts: Barry O'Connor 0-5 (1tp, 2f), Jake Firman 0-4 (1tp, 1f), Daithí Waters 0-1, Luke Kavanagh 0-1, Ben Maddock 0-1		Pts: Páraic Hughes 0-3 (1tp), Vincent Higgins 1-0, Cian Hughes 0-2, Eoin Hughes 0-2, Dean O'Toole 0-2 (2f), Seán Hughes 0-2 (tp), Niall Hughes 0-2 (tp), Pádraig Jones 0-1, Seán Forde 0-1 (f)

Chadwicks Wexford Park, Wexford
Referee: Eamonn Furlong (Starlights)

St Martin's	Kilanerin–Ballyfad
