= Wexford Intermediate A Hurling Championship =

- Code: Hurling
- Founded: 2012; 14 years ago
- Region: Wexford (GAA)
- No. of teams: 12
- Title holders: Gusserane-O'Rahilly's (2nd title)
- Sponsors: Top Oil
- Official website: Official website

The Wexford Intermediate A Hurling Championship (known for sponsorship reasons as the Top Oil Intermediate A Hurling Championship) is an annual hurling competition contested by mid-tier Wexford GAA clubs. It is the 3rd tier of the Wexford GAA hurling championships The Wexford County Board of the Gaelic Athletic Association has organised it since 2012.

Gusserane-O'Rahilly's are the title-holders (2026) defeating St Abban's Adamstown in the Final.

== History ==
The Wexford Intermediate A Hurling Championship dates back to 2012. It was the fourth championship to be established in Wexford following the Wexford Senior Hurling Championship in 1889, the Wexford Junior Hurling Championship in 1903 and the Wexford Intermediate Hurling Championship in 1930.

== Format ==
The series of games are played during the summer and autumn months with the county final currently being played in October. The championship features a group stage before the top-ranking teams complete a knock-out series of games. Each year the winners of the Wexford Junior Hurling Championship are promoted to the Intermediate A championship with one team being relegated each year to the Junior level.

Twelve clubs currently participate in the Wexford Intermediate A Championship.

== Teams ==
=== 2026 teams ===
Team	Location	Colours	In championship since
Clongeen	Clongeen	Green and gold	?
Duffry Rover	Ballindaggin	Green, white and gold	2025
Gusserane-O'Rahilly's	Ballyculane	Blue and gold	?
Marshalstown-Castledockrell	Farmleigh	Green and gold	2026
Monageer—Boolavogue	?	?	?
Oulart–The Ballagh	Oulart	Black and red	?
Rathgarogue—Cushinstown	?	?	?
Shelmaliers	Castlebridge	Black and amber	?
St Abban's Adamstown	?	?	?
St Martin's	Murrintown	Maroon and white	?
St Mary's Rosslare	Tagoat	Blue and yellow	?
Taghmon-Camross	Taghmon	Blue and yellow	?

== Qualification for subsequent competitions ==
At the end of the championship, the winning team qualify to the subsequent Leinster Junior Club Hurling Championship.

== Honours ==
The winners of the Intermediate A championship are promoted to the Intermediate Championship (2nd tier) and participate in the Leinster Junior Hurling Championship. One team is relegated from the Intermediate Championship each season to take their place

== List of finals ==
=== List of Wexford IAHC finals ===
Year	Winners		Runners-up		Location
Year	Club	Score	Club	Score	Location
2026	Gusserane O'Rahilly's	1-17	St Abban's Adamstown	1-12	Chadwick's Wexford Park
2025	Davidstown-Courtnacuddy	3-15	Duffry Rovers	0-16	Chadwick's Wexford Park
2024	Castletown Liam Mellows		Monageer–Boolavogue		
2023	Craanford Fr O'Regan's		Rathgarouge-Cushinstown		
2022	Horeswood	2-15	Castletown Liam Mellows	1-17	Chadwick's Wexford Park
2021	Tara Rocks	0-16	Castletown Liam Mellows	2-08	Chadwick's Wexford Park
2020	Gusserane O'Rahilly's	4-20	Craanford Fr O'Regan's	1-09	Innovate Wexford Park, Wexford
2019	Ballygarrett-Réalt na Mara	1-14	Geraldine O'Hanrahans	1-13	Innovate Wexford Park, Wexford
2018	Taghmon-Camross	1-13	Duffry Rovers	3-06	Innovate Wexford Park, Wexford
2017	Fethard St Mogues	1-14	Duffry Rovers	0-13	Innovate Wexford Park, Wexford
2016	St James's	2-13 (0-12)	Fethard St Mogues	0-11 (0-12)	Innovate Wexford Park, Wexford
2015	Monageer–Boolavogue	3-10	St James's	1-15	Innovate Wexford Park, Wexford
2014	Crossabeg–Ballymurn		Monageer–Boolavogue		Wexford Park, Wexford
2013	Shamrocks	0-15	Monageer–Boolavogue	1-07	Wexford Park, Wexford
2012	Naomh Éanna		Marshalstown–Castledockrell		Wexford Park, Wexford

== See also ==
- Wexford Senior Hurling Championship (Tier 1)
- Wexford Intermediate Hurling Championship (Tier 2)
- Wexford Junior Hurling Championship (Tier 4)
- Wexford Junior A Hurling Championship (Tier 5)
- Wexford Junior B Hurling Championship (Tier 6)
