= Jim Byrne (dual player) =

Irish Gaelic football player and hurler

Personal information
- Native name: Séamus Ó Broin (Irish)
- Born: 1973 (age 52–53) Fethard; County Wexford, Ireland

Sport
- Football Position: Left wing-forward
- Hurling Position: Left wing-forward
Club
- Years: Club
- Fethard St Mogues
Club titles
	Football	Hurling
Wexford titles	1	0
College
- Years: College
- University College Dublin
College titles
- Fitzgibbon titles: 1
Inter-county
- Years: County
- 1993–1999: Wexford
Inter-county titles
	Football	Hurling
Leinster Titles	0	1
All-Ireland Titles	0	1
League titles	0	0
All-Stars	0	0

James Byrne (born 1973) is an Irish hurling and Gaelic football coach and former player of both sports. At club level, he played with Fethard St Mogues and University College Dublin and at inter-county level was a dual player at all levels with Wexford.

== Playing career ==
At club level, Byrne first played for the Fethard St Mogues club as a dual player in the juvenile and underage grades before progressing to adult level. He won a Wexford JAHC title in 1992, followed by a Wexford IHC title in 1994. Byrne won a Wexford SFC medal when Fethard claimed their very first title in 1998, after a 1–09 to 1–06 defeat of Gusserane O'Rahilly's in the final.

Byrne also lined out with University College Dublin during his studies there. He captained the team to the Fitzgibbon Cup title in 1993, and narrowly missed out on a second winners' medal in 2000. He also won a Dublin SHC that season, following a 3–15 to 1–09 defeat of St Vincent's in the final.

At inter-county level, Byrne played hurling and Gaelic football for Wexford at all grades from under-14 up to senior. He won a Leinster JFC medal in 1992, before later claiming an All-Ireland JFC medal following Wexford's one-point defeat of Cork in the All-Ireland junior final. Byrne later won a Leinster SHC medal as a substitute, as well as an All-Ireland SHC medal as a substitute following Wexford's defeat of Limerick in 1996.

== Coaching career ==
Byrne first became involved in team management when he was player-manager with the Fethard St Mogues intermediate hurling team. He became a selector as part of John Meyler's Wexford senior hurling management team in November 2006.

== Honours ==
University College Dublin

- Fitzgibbon Cup: 1993 (c)
- Dublin Senior Hurling Championship: 2000

Fethard St Mogues

- Wexford Senior Football Championship: 1998
- Wexford Intermediate Hurling Championship: 1994
- Wexford Junior A Hurling Championship: 1992

Wexford

- All-Ireland Senior Hurling Championship: 1996
- Leinster Senior Hurling Championship: 1996
- All-Ireland Junior Football Championship: 1992
- Leinster Junior Football Championship: 1992
