= 1984 All-Ireland Junior Football Championship =

All Ireland Champions
- Winners: Cork (6th win)
- Captain: Ciarán O'Reilly

All Ireland Runners-up
- Runners-up: Warwickshire
- Captain: P. Moran

Provincial Champions
- Munster: Cork
- Leinster: Wexford
- Ulster: Cavan
- Connacht: Galway

The 1984 All-Ireland Junior Football Championship was the 54th staging of the All-Ireland Junior Championship since its establishment by the Gaelic Athletic Association in 1912.

Kerry entered the championship as the defending champions, however, they were beaten by Cork in the Munster final.

The All-Ireland final was played on 9 September 1984 at Roger Casement Park in Coventry between Cork and Warwickshire, in what was their third ever meeting in the final and a first in 29 years. Cork won the match by 3–20 to 0–07 to claim their sixth championship title overall and a first tile in 12 years.

== Results ==
=== Munster Junior Football Championship ===
13 July 1984 Final	Kerry	0-09 - 1-12	Cork	Con Keating Park, Cahersiveen
				Referee: R. Moloney (Limerick)

=== Leinster Junior Football Championship ===
10 June 1984 Final	Wexford	0-08 - 0-06	Louth	Croke Park, Dublin
	S. O'Shea 0-3, G. Hearne 0-3, G. Foley, E. O'Brien 0-1 each		S. McGahon 0-2, S. Melia, P. Hand, E. Murray, D. McCarthy 0-1 each	Referee: T. Jordan (Dublin)

GK	1	Phil Walsh (Bannow–Ballymitty)
RCB	2	Brendan Murphy (St Joseph's)
FB	3	Jack O'Leary (Blackwater)
LCB	4	Eamonn O'Connor (St John's Volunteers) (c)
RHB	5	Luke Finn (Craanford)
CHB	6	Ger O'Brien (Réalt na Mara)
LHB	7	George Foley (Fethard St Mogues)
MF	8	John Creane (St Mary's, Maudlintown)
MF	9	Pat McGrath (Bannow–Ballymitty)
RHF	10	George Hearne (Horeswood)
CHF	11	Pat Barden (Adamstown)
LHF	12	Seánie O'Shea (Blackwater)
RCF	13	Séamus Kennelly (Réalt na Mara)
FF	14	Michael Walsh (Glynn–Barntown)
LCF	15	Nicky Jones (St John's Volunteers)
Substitutes:
	16	Eugene O'Brien (Réalt na Mara) for McGrath
	17	Matty Furlong (Blackwater) for M. Walsh
	18	James Stafford (Clongeen) for Kennelly

GK	1	Mal Clarke (Oliver Plunketts)
RCB	2	Dessie Tuite (Seán O'Mahony's)
FB	3	Brendan Byrne (St Mochta's) (c)
LCB	4	Declan Healy (Naomh Máirtín)
RHB	5	Eugene Murtagh (St Joseph's)
CHB	6	Barry O'Brien (Seán O'Mahony's)
LHB	7	Jim Matthews (Hunterstown Rovers)
MF	8	Stephen Melia (John Mitchels)
MF	9	Eamonn McCann (St Patrick's)
RHF	10	Gerry Murphy (Naomh Malachi)
CHF	11	Seán McGahon (Seán McDermott's)
LHF	12	Pat Hand (Naomh Fionnbarra)
RCF	13	Paul Matthews (Naomh Malachi)
FF	14	Donal McCarthy (St Patrick's)
LCF	15	Enda Murray (Dundalk Young Irelands)
Substitutes:
	16	Kevin Roden (Oliver Plunketts) for Matthews
	17	Pat Lynch (Dreadnots) for McCarthy
	18	Stefan White (O'Connells) for Murphy

=== Ulster Junior Football Championship ===
15 June 1984 Final	Cavan	2-07 - 0-10	Tyrone	Brewster Park, Enniskillen
				Referee: B. Mone (Monaghan)

=== Connacht Junior Football Championship ===
26 May 1984 Final	Mayo	0-07 - 2-07	Galway	Flanagan Park, Ballinrobe
				Referee: P. Kearns (Sligo)

=== All-Ireland semi-finals ===
22 July 1984 Semi-final	Galway	2-05 - 1-09	Cork	Tuam Stadium
				Referee: C. Ó'Connalláin (Westmeath)

22 July 1984 Semi-final	Cavan	0-04 - 0-09	Wexford	Breffni Park, Cavan
				Referee: S. Mullanny (Roscommon)

=== All-Ireland home final ===
12 August 1984 Home final	Cork	1-10 - 0-09	Wexford	Fraher Field, Dungarvan
				Referee: P. Russell (Tipperary)

=== All-Ireland final ===
9 September 1984 Final	Warwickshire	0-07 - 3-20	Cork	Roger Casement Park, Coventry
	D. Brennan, N. McLean, S. Dunne 0-2 each, A. Smith 0-1		M. McCarthy 3-4, N. O'Connor 0-4, T. Cole, C. Collins, P. Barrett, C. O'Reilly, P. O'Connor 0-2 each, J. O'Sullivan, G. O'Rourke 0-1 each	Referee: T. Moran (Leitrim)
