= Phil Wilson (hurler) =

Irish hurler and Gaelic footballer

Personal information
- Native name: Pilib Mac Liam (Irish)
- Born: 1939 (age 86–87) Ballyhogue, County Wexford, Ireland
- Occupation: Shop owner
- Height: 6 ft 0 in (183 cm)

Sport
- Sport: Hurling
- Position: Midfield
Clubs
- Years: Club
- Ballyhogue; Oylegate–Glenbrien; Rapparees Starlights
Club titles
	Football	Hurling
Wexford titles	5	2
Inter-county
- Years: County
- 1956-1970 1961-1974: Wexford (SF); Wexford (SH)
Inter-county titles
- Leinster titles: 4
- All-Irelands: 1
- NHL: 2

Philip Wilson (born 1939) is an Irish hurling manager and former dual player. At club level, he lined played with Ballyhogue, Oylegate–Glenbrien and Rapparees Starlights and at inter-county level played both hurling and Gaelic football with the Wexford senior teams.

== Playing career ==
At club level, Wilson first played hurling and Gaelic football with Ballyhogue. He was part of five Wexford SFC-winning teams between 1962 and 1972. Wilson also had success as a hurler with Ballyhogue, winning Wexford JHC medals in 1965 and 1971. Both of those victories were immediately followed by Wexford IHC titles.

Wilson also lined out with a number of other clubs during his career. He was part of the Oylegate–Glenbrien team that beat Horeswood to win the Wexford SHC title in 1963. He ended his club career with Rapparees Starlights, winning Wexford IFC honours in 1977 before claiming a second Wexford SHC medal in 1978.

At inter-county level, Wilson first played for Wexford during a two-year tenure as a dual player at minor level in 1956 and 1957. He was still eligible for the minor grade when he made his Wexford senior football team debut in the 1956–57 National Football League. A period of time spent in England resulted in Wilson lining out with both London teams as a dual player. He won an All-Ireland JHC medal after a 4-08 to 2-11 win over Carlow in the 1960 All-Ireland junior final replay.

Wilson returned to Ireland and made his Wexford senior hurling team debut in 1961. He won four Leinster SHC medals in total and, after All-Ireland final defeats by Tipperary in 1962 and 1965, he claimed an All-Ireland SHC medal in 1968 after lining out at full-forward in the 5-08 to 3-12 victory over Tipperary. Wilson's other inter-county honours include two National Hurling League medals.

Performances at inter-county level for Wexford resulted in Wilson being called up to the Leinster inter-provincial team. He won Railway Cup medals in 1964, 1965, 1967 and 1972 following defeats of Munster.

== Management career ==
In retirement from playing, Wilson became involved in team management and coaching. He trained the Cloughbawn club to the Wexford SHC title in 1993. Wilson later took charge of the Geraldine O'Hanrahans club.

== Honours ==
=== Player ===
Oylegate–Glenbrien

- Wexford Senior Hurling Championship: 1963

Rapparees Starlights

- Wexford Senior Hurling Championship: 1978
- Wexford Intermediate Football Championship: 1977

Ballyhogue

- Wexford Senior Football Championship: 1962, 1963, 1964 (c), 1971, 1972
- Wexford Intermediate Hurling Championship: 1966, 1972
- Wexford Junior Hurling Championship: 1965, 1971

London

- All-Ireland Junior Hurling Championship: 1960

Wexford

- All-Ireland Senior Hurling Championship: 1968
- Leinster Senior Hurling Championship: 1962, 1965, 1968, 1970
- National Hurling League: 1966–67, 1972–73
- Leinster Intermediate Hurling Championship: 1965

Leinster

- Railway Cup: 1964, 1965, 1967, 1972

=== Management ===
Cloughbawn

- Wexford Senior Hurling Championship: 1993
