= 2016 Wexford Senior Football Championship =

Wexford S.F.C.
- Season: 2016
- Champions: Gusserane O'Rahillys (6th S.F.C. Title)
- Relegated: Adamstown St Abban's
- All Ireland SCFC: n/a

The 2016 Wexford Senior Football Championship was the 118th edition of the Wexford GAA's premier club Gaelic football tournament for senior graded teams in County Wexford, Ireland. The tournament consisted of 12 teams, with the winner going on to represent Wexford in the Leinster Senior Club Football Championship.

St James' Ramsgrange were the defending champions after they defeated St. Martin's in the previous years final, however they relinquished their title to the same club at the quarter-final stage.

This was Glynn–Barntown's return to the senior grade after claiming the 2015 Wexford Intermediate Football Championship title.

Adamstown St Abban's were relegated back to the I.F.C. for 2017 after 20 years as a senior club with two S.F.C. final appearances in this period.

On 9 October 2016, Gusserane O'Rahillys claimed their 6th S.F.C. title when they defeated Glynn–Barntown on a scoreline of 0-11 to 0-10 at Wexford Park. This ended a 41-year wait for the club for S.F.C. honours.

== Team changes ==
The following teams have changed division since the 2015 championship season.

=== To S.F.C. ===
Promoted from I.F.C.

- Glynn–Barntown – (Intermediate Champions)

=== From S.F.C. ===
Relegated to I.F.C.

- St Fintan's

== Group stage ==
There are 2 groups called Group A and B. The top 4 in each group qualify for the Quarter Finals. The bottom finisher in each group will qualify for the Relegation Final.

=== Group A ===
| Team | Pld | W | L | D | PF | PA | PD | Pts |
|---|---|---|---|---|---|---|---|---|
| Castletown Liam Mellows | 5 | 5 | 0 | 0 | 74 | 51 | +23 | 10 |
| St Anne's Rathangan | 5 | 3 | 2 | 0 | 70 | 56 | +14 | 6 |
| Glynn–Barntown | 5 | 3 | 2 | 0 | 70 | 62 | +8 | 6 |
| St James' | 5 | 2 | 2 | 1 | 53 | 56 | -3 | 5 |
| Horeswood | 5 | 1 | 3 | 1 | 55 | 74 | -19 | 3 |
| Starlights | 5 | 0 | 5 | 0 | 64 | 87 | -23 | 0 |

Round 1

- Castletown 2-12, 3-7 Glynn–Barntown, 8/4/2016,
- Horeswood 4-10, 2-13 Starlights, 23/4/2016,
- St James' 0-12, 1-7 St Anne's, 24/4/2016,

Round 2

- St Anne's 1-7, 0-9 Glynn–Barntown, 15/4/2016,
- Castletown 0-10, 0-9 Horeswood, 15/4/2016,
- St James' 3-6, 0-10 Starlights, 17/4/2016,

Round 3

- Glynn–Barntown 0-15, 0-9 Horeswood, 28/5/2016,
- Castletown 1-11, 0-8 St James', 4/6/2016,
- St Anne's 2-13, 1-8 Starlights, 4/6/2016,

Round 4

- Horeswood 1-5, 0-8 St James', 6/8/2016,
- Castletown 1-14, 0-9 St Anne's Rathangan,7/8/2016,
- Glynn–Barntown 2-10, 0-15 Starlights, 7/8/2016,

Round 5

- St Anne's 2-16, 1-4 Horeswood, 19/8/2016,
- Glynn–Barntown 1-11, 2-4 St James', 19/8/2016,
- Castletown 1-12, 1-6 Starlights, 20/8/2016,

=== Group B ===
| Team | Pld | W | L | D | PF | PA | PD | Pts |
|---|---|---|---|---|---|---|---|---|
| St Martin's | 5 | 5 | 0 | 0 | 94 | 44 | +50 | 10 |
| Shelmaliers | 5 | 3 | 1 | 1 | 65 | 51 | +14 | 7 |
| Gusserane O'Rahilly's | 5 | 3 | 2 | 0 | 59 | 59 | +0 | 6 |
| St Mogue's Fethard | 5 | 2 | 3 | 0 | 57 | 61 | -4 | 4 |
| Sarsfields | 5 | 1 | 4 | 0 | 59 | 95 | -36 | 2 |
| Adamstown St Abban's | 5 | 0 | 4 | 1 | 52 | 76 | -24 | 1 |

Round 1

- Shelmaliers 1-16, 1-5 Sarsfields, 8/4/2016,
- Gusserane 2-8, 1-8 Adamstown, 24/4/2016,
- St Martin's 0-10, 1-3 Fethard, 24/4/2016,

Round 2

- Shelmaliers 0-10, 0-9 Gusserane, 17/4/2016,
- Fethard 1-11, 3-4 Sarsfields, 17/4/2016,
- St Martin's 3-12, 0-6 Adamstown, 17/4/2016,

Round 3

- Fethard 3-7, 0-11 Adamstown, 28/5/2016,
- Gusserane 1-14, 1-6 Sarsfields, 31/5/2016,
- St Martin's 1-11, 0-11 Shelmaliers, 5/6/2016,

Round 4

- Shelmaliers 1-10, 0-8 Fethard, 6/8/2016,
- Sarsfields 2-7, 0-12 Adamstown, 7/8/2016,
- St Martin's 1-13, 0-5 Gusserane, 7/8/2016,

Round 5

- Shelmaliers 0-12, 1-9 Adamstown, 20/8/2016,
- St Martin's 4-21, 2-10 Sarsfields, 20/8/2016,
- Gusserane 1-11, 1-10 Fethard, 20/8/2016,

== Knock-out stages ==
=== Relegation final ===
The bottom finisher from both groups qualify for the Relegation final. The loser will be relegated to the 2017 Intermediate Championship.

- Starlights 3-10, 1-11 Adamstown, Enniscorthy, 2/9/2016,

=== Finals ===
The top 4 teams from each group qualify for the Quarter-Finals with 1st -vs- 4th and 2nd -vs- 3rd in each case.

| Quarter-Finals | | Semi-Finals | | Final |
| Castletown | 2-12 |
| St Mogue's Fethard | 1-9 | Castletown | 0-6 |
| Gusserane O'Rahilly's | 1-12 | Gusserane O'Rahilly's | 0-9 |
| St Anne's Rathangan | 1-6 | | | Gusserane O'Rahillys |
| Shelmaliers | 0-13 | | | Glynn–Barntown |
| Glynn–Barntown | 0-14 | Glynn–Barntown | 2-12 |
| St. James' | 0-8 | St Martin's | 0-9 |
| St Martin's | 0-12 |

Quarter-finals:

9/2/16

| Castletown Liam Mellows | 2-12 – 1-9 | Fethard |
|---|---|---|
| Donnacha Holmes 2-1, Brendan Halpin and Anthony Masterson 0-2 each, Richard Farrell, Andy Merrigan, Stephen Moloney (1 '45), Conor Carty (0-1f), Pierce Maxwell, Yusuf Frih 0-1 each | | Ruairi Tubrid 1-0, Richard Waters (0-3f) and Mikie Dwyer (0-1f) 0-3 each, John Tubritt 0-2, Mark Wallace 0-1 |

Bellefield
Referee: Billy Dodd (Sarsfields)
9/3/16

| Glynn–Barntown | 0-14 – 0-13 | Shelmaliers |
|---|---|---|
| Michael O'Regan 0-5 (0-4f), Mark Fanning 0-3, Craig Doyle and Robert Dempsey 0-2 each, Michael Doyle and Matthew Joyce 0-1 each | | Derek Walsh 0-3f, Tommy Barron 0-2, Brian Malone, Glen Malone, Aaron Murphy, Adam Whitmore (0-1f), Craig McCabe, Brendan Barron, Barry O'Connor (0-1f), Conor Hearne 0-1 each |

Bellefield
Referee: Anthony Tobin (Geraldine O'Hanrahans)
9/3/16

| St Martin's | 0-12 – 0-8 | St James' |
|---|---|---|
| Ciaran Lyng 0-5 (0-2f), Jack O'Connor 0-2 (0-1f, 1 '45), Jake Firman, Paudie Kelly, Ryan Murphy, Ciaran Redmond, Joe Coleman 0-1 each | | Kevin O'Grady 0-4 (0-1f), Adam Parle 0-2 (0-1f), Matthew O'Hanlon (0-1f) and Mark Molloy 0-1 each |

Wexford Park
Referee: John Carton (Monageer–Boolavogue)
9/3/16

| Gusserane O'Rahilly's | 1-12 – 1-6 | St Anne's |
|---|---|---|
| Shane Cullen 1-4 (0-4f), Adrian Flynn 0-3f, Paraic Conway and Sean Ryan 0-2 each, Jamie Cooney 0-1 | | Francis Simpson 1-1, Sean Gaul 0-4 (0-3f), David Fogarty 0-1 |

Wexford Park
Referee: Kevin Carty (Sarsfields)

Semi-dinals:

- Gusserane O'Rahilly's 0-9, 0-6 Castletown Liam Mellows, Wexford Park, 25/9/2016, Report
- Glynn–Barntown 2-12, 0-9 St Martin's, Wexford Park, 25/9/2016, Report

Final:

- Gusserane O'Rahilly's 0-11, 0-10 Glynn–Barntown, Wexford Park, 9/10/2016,
