= Cathal Dunbar =

Irish hurler (born 1996)

Personal information
- Born: 1996 (age 29–30) Gorey, County Wexford, Ireland
- Occupation: Student

Sport
- Sport: Hurling
- Position: Right corner-forward
Clubs
- Years: Club
- Ballygarrett-Réalt na Mara; Naomh Éanna
Club titles
- Wexford titles: 1
College
- Years: College
- Institute of Technology, Carlow
College titles
- Fitzgibbon titles: 0
Inter-county*
Years	County	Apps (scores)
2016–present	Wexford	10 (0-06)
Inter-county titles
- Leinster titles: 1
- All-Irelands: 0
- NHL: 0
- All Stars: 0
- *Inter County team apps and scores correct as of 19:55, 1 July 2019.

Cathal Dunbar (born 1996) is an Irish hurler who plays for Wexford Senior Championship club Naomh Éanna and at inter-county level with the Wexford senior hurling team. He usually lines out as a right corner-forward.

== Playing career ==
=== Gorey Community School ===
Dunbar first came to prominence as a hurler with Gorey Community School. He played in every grade of hurling before eventually joining the college's senior hurling team and lined out in several Leinster Championship campaigns.

=== Institute of Technology, Carlow ===
As a student at the Institute of Technology, Carlow, Dunbar joined the senior hurling team during his second year. He lined out for the college in several Fitzgibbon Cup campaigns.

=== Naomh Éanna ===
Dunbar joined the Ballygarrett-Réalt na Mara club at a young age and played in all grades at juvenile and underage levels before eventually joining the club's top adult team.

In January 2018, it was announced that Dunbar sought a transfer from his home club to Gorey town's Naomh Éanna. The transfer was met with heavy opposition as Ballygarrett-Réalt na Mara club officials disputed the fact that Dunbar was living in Gorey. The transfer was eventually completed after two months. On 21 October 2018, Dunbar lined out at left corner-forward when Naomh Éanna reached the final of the Wexford Senior Championship. He scored 1-04 from play and ended the game with a winners' medal following the 2–11 to 0–13 defeat of St. Martin's.

=== Wexford ===
==== Minor and under-21 ====
Dunbar first lined out for Wexford as a member of the minor team during the 2013 Leinster Championship. He made his first appearance for the team on 4 May when he lined out at midfield in a 3–07 to 1–10 defeat by Kilkenny.

Dunbar was eligible for the minor grade again during the 2014 Leinster Championship. He played his last game in the grade on 21 June 2014 when he scored a point from midfield in a 0–17 to 0–16 defeat by Dublin.

Dunbar was drafted onto the Wexford under-21 team for the 20135Leinster Championship. He made his first appearance for the team on 27 May 2015 when he came on as a 41st-minute substitute in Wexford's 0–23 to 0–14 defeat of Kildare. On 8 July 2015, Dunbar won a Leinster Championship medal after scoring 1-01 from right corner-forward in the 4–17 to 1–09 defeat of Kilkenny in the final. He retained his position at right corner-forward for the All-Ireland final against Limerick on 12 September 2015. Dunbar scored a point from play but ended the game on the losing side following a 0–26 to 1–07 defeat.

Dunbar was eligible for the under-21 grade for a third and final season in 2017. On 5 July, O'Connor he two points from right corner-forward when Wexford suffered a 0–30 to 1–15 defeat by Kilkenny in the Leinster final.

==== Senior ====
Dunbar was added to the Wexford senior team in advance of the 2016 National League. He made his first appearance for the team on 13 February 2016 when he was selected at right corner-forward but lined out at left wing-forward in Wexford's 2–23 to 0–15 defeat by Limerick. Dunbar made his first Leinster Championship appearance on 21 May 2016 when he was introduced as a half-time substitute for Andrew Kenny in a 2–19 to 0–12 defeat by Dublin.

On 2 July 2017, Dunbar was named on the bench when Wexford qualified for their first Leinster final in nine years. He came on as a 53rd-minute substitute for Harry Kehoe and scored a point in the 0–29 to 1–17 defeat by Galway.

On 20 January 2018, Dunbar lined out at left wing-forward when Wexford faced Kilkenny in the Walsh Cup final. He scored a point from play in the 1-24 apiece draw. Wexford won the subsequent free-taking shoot-out, with Dunbar claiming his first silverware at senior level with Wexford.

Wexford reached a second Leinster final in three years on 30 June 2019. Dunbar was selected at right corner-forward but started the game on the bench after a series of late changes. He came on as a 59th-minute substitute for Paul Morris and collected a winners' medal following the 1–23 to 0–23 defeat of Kilkenny.

== Career statistics ==
As of match played 30 June 2019.

Team	Year	National League			Leinster		All-Ireland		Total	
Team	Year	Division	Apps	Score	Apps	Score	Apps	Score	Apps	Score
Wexford	2016	Division 1B	3	0-01	1	0-00	2	0-00	6	0-01
Wexford	2017	Division 1B	0	0-00	1	0-01	0	0-00	1	0-01
Wexford	2018	Division 1A	6	0-03	1	0-00	0	0-00	7	0-03
Wexford	2019	Division 1A	6	1-07	5	0-05	0	0-00	11	1-12
Total			15	1-11	8	0-06	2	0-00	25	1-17

== Honours ==
Naomh Éanna

- Wexford Senior Hurling Championship (1): 2018

Wexford

- Leinster Senior Hurling Championship (1): 2019
- Walsh Cup (1): 2018
- Leinster Under-21 Hurling Championship (1): 2015
