= Cluain Caoin =

Cluain Caoin may refer to two places in Ireland:

- Clonkeen, a townland in County Cavan
- Clongeen, a village in County Wexford
