= Davidstown/Courtnacuddy GAA =

GAA club in County Wexford, Ireland

Davidstown/Courtnacuddy
- Baile Dháithí/Cúl Mochíoda
- Founded: 1954
- County: Wexford
- Colours
- Grounds: Boolbawn Grounds

Playing kits
Standard colours

Senior Club Championships
	All Ireland	Leinster champions	Wexford champions
Hurling:	0	0	0

Davidstown/Courtnacuddy Hurling & Football Club is a Gaelic Athletic Association club in Davidstown, County Wexford, Ireland. The club fields teams in both hurling and Gaelic football.

== History ==
Located in Davidstown, about 10 km from Enniscorthy, Davidstown/Courtnacuddy Hurling & Football Club was founded in 1954, with a view to amalgamating the four existing clubs in the parish into one united club. Prior to this, Ballinavary Emmets, Courtnacuddy and Davidstown operated as individual hurling clubs, while Scoby Rovers was the local Gaelic football club. St Benen's was adopted as the official name of the club.

The new club reached the Wexford MAHC final in 1955, before winning the Enniscorthy District JAHC title in 1957. By 1961, the club had changed its name to Davidstown/Courtnacuddy and won the Wexford JAHC title for the first time in their history. Two years later, Davidstown/Courtnacuddy secured senior status after winning the Wexford IHC title.

The decades that followed saw the club return to the junior ranks. A further three Wexford JAHC titles were won in 1990, 2007 and 2022. Davidstown/Courtnacuddy won the Wexford IAHC title in 2025, after beating Duffry Rovers by 3–15 to 0–16 in the final.

== Honours ==
- Wexford Intermediate Hurling Championship (1): 1963
- Leinster Junior Club Hurling Championship (1): 2025
- Wexford Intermediate A Hurling Championship (1): 2025
- Wexford Junior A Hurling Championship (4): 1961, 1990, 2007, 2022

== Notable players ==
- David Dunne: Leinster SHC-winner (2014)
- Andrew Shore: Railway Cup-winner (2014)
