= Tomás Waters =

Irish hurler

Personal information
- Native name: Tomás Mac Con Uisce (Irish)
- Born: 16 February 1987 (age 39) Wexford, Ireland

Sport
- Sport: Hurling
- Position: Full back
Club
- Years: Club
- 2005-: St Martin's
Inter-county
- Years: County
- 2009–2015: Wexford
Inter-county titles
- NHL: 1

Tomás Waters (born 16 February 1987 in Wexford, Ireland) is an Irish sportsperson. He plays hurling with his local club St Martin's and is a member of the Wexford senior inter-county team.

== Playing career ==
=== Club ===
Waters plays with his local hurling club St Martin's. He first joined senior level in early 2007 when Wexford were struggling a fair bit in the hurling.

=== Inter-county ===
Waters made his senior debut against Offaly in the Leinster Quarter-Final after being selected by new manager Colm Bonnar to replace one of the injured key players which turned to be a great success where he scored two points each and earned a win with the scoreline 2–17 to 0–16.
