= Damien Fitzhenry =

Wexford hurling coach and former player

Personal information
- Native name: Damien Mac Einrí (Irish)
- Nickname: Fitzy
- Born: 5 July 1974 (age 52) Kiltealy, County Wexford, Ireland
- Occupation: Wholesaler
- Height: 5 ft 11 in (180 cm)

Sport
- Sport: Hurling
- Position: Goalkeeper
Club
- Years: Club
- 1991–2012: Duffry Rovers
Club titles
| | Football | Hurling |
| Wexford titles | 3 | 0 |
Inter-county*
| Years | County | Apps (scores) |
| 1993–2010 | Wexford | 56 (5–3) |
Inter-county titles
- Leinster titles: 3
- All-Irelands: 1
- NHL: 0
- All Stars: 2
- *Inter County team apps and scores correct as of 23:24, 31 January 2018.

Damien Fitzhenry (born 5 July 1974) is an Irish hurling coach and former player. His league and championship career as a goalkeeper with the Wexford senior team spanned eighteen seasons from 1993 until 2010. Fitzhenry is widely regarded as Wexford's greatest ever goalkeeper.

== Playing career ==
=== Club ===
The Fitzhenry name has been associated with the Duffry Rovers club since the 1970s. Damien, the youngest of fifteen children, currently plays his club hurling and football with 'the Rovers' and is following in the footsteps of his brothers Mark, Tom, Séamus, John, Martin, Gerard, Noel, Paddy and Fran. As well as that three of Fitzhenry's sisters, Tina, Mary and Ann, have also played camogie with Duffry Rovers. Fitzhenry joined the senior ranks of the club in late 1991 and shared in the club's famous run of seven county football titles in-a-row between 1986 and 1992.

=== Inter-county ===
Fitzhenry first came to prominence in early 1992 when he joined the Wexford minor hurling panel. He quickly moved onto the under-21 panel; however, he had little success in either of these grades.

In early 1993, Fitzhenry made his senior debut in the National Hurling League quarter-final against Westmeath. Wexford went on to reach the National League final that year. The opponent was Cork; however, the game ended in a draw. The replay saw extra-time being played; however, the game ended level again. Cork won by 3–11 to 1–12 at the third attempt. In spite of this defeat, expectations were high for the Leinster Senior Hurling Championship (SHC). In the final of that competition Wexford drew with All-Ireland SHC title holder Kilkenny. The replay was a different affair as Kilkenny won handily enough by 2–12 to 0–11.

Wexford lost the 1994 Leinster SHC final before disappearing from the championship at the first hurdle in 1995. By 1996 things were beginning to change in Wexford, thanks in no small way to the new manager Liam Griffin. Fitzhenry lined out in goals in the Leinster SHC final. Offaly provided the opposition; however, history was made as Wexford won by 2–23 to 2–15. It was Fitzhenry's first Leinster SHC title and Wexford's first since 1977. Wexford later defeated Galway in the penultimate game of the championship, setting up an All-Ireland Senior Hurling Championship (SHC) final meeting with Limerick. The Munster men were slight favourites going into the game. They were the beaten finalists of 1994 and had already beaten reigning champion Clare in the Munster Senior Hurling Championship (SHC). The game was far from a classic; however, it did provide excitement. Tom Dempsey was the hero of the day as he scored a goal after nineteen minutes to give Wexford a major advantage. His side led by 1–8 to 0–10 at half-time in spite of having Éamonn Scallon sent off. Wexford took a four-point lead in the second-half; however, this was whittled back to two points as Wexford hung on for the last twenty minutes. The final score of 1–13 to 0–14 showed how vital Dempsey's goal was. It was Fitzhenry's first All-Ireland SHC medal and Wexford's first since 1968.

In 1997, Fitzhenry won a second Leinster SHC title as Wexford defeated Kilkenny. A 2–14 to 1–11 victory secured a safe passage to the 1997 All-Ireland SHC semi-final where defeated Munster SHC finalist Tipperary provided the opposition. Tipp won the game, and so ended Wexford's bid to retain the All-Ireland SHC title. Despite that defeat, Fitzhenry was recognised as the championship's best goalkeeper and was presented with his first All-Star award.

The departure of Liam Griffin as manager resulted in a downturn in Wexford's fortunes. Offaly and Kilkenny monopolised the Leinster SHC final for the next three years from 1998 until 2000. Fitzhenry's side were back in the Leinster SHC final in 2001; however, a 2–19 to 0–12 defeat by Kilkenny proved how off the pace the team were. Despite this, Wexford reached the 2001 All-Ireland SHC semi-final and drew with Tipperary. Tipp won the replay and went on to claim the All-Ireland SHC title for the first time in a decade.

Fitzhenry's side lost to Kilkenny in the Leinster SHC finals of 2002 and 2003; however, they ended up in the All-Ireland SHC semi-final in the latter year. In that game Wexford drew with Cork in an exciting challenge; however, Cork crushed Wexford in the replay.

Wexford faced Kilkenny in the 2004 Leinster SHC semi-final. While most people expected an easy victory for 'the Cats', Wexford sealed the win with a dramatic last-second goal resulting in a one-point victory. Wexford went on to defeat Offaly in the final, giving Fitzhenry his Leinster SHC medal. That result allowed Wexford to advance to the 2004 All-Ireland SHC semi-final; however, Cork claimed victory in the penultimate stage of the championship. Fitzhenry was recognised as the best goalkeeper in the country again and presented with a second All-Star award.

The following few years brought little success to Fitzhenry or Wexford. Although the team suffered defeats in the Leinster SHC, they still made their way to the All-Ireland SHC quarter-finals.

In 2007, Wexford lost the Leinster SHC final by double scores to Kilkenny; however, the team later shocked Tipperary in the 2007 All-Ireland SHC quarter-final. Fitzhenry scored a crucial goal in that game to secure the victory and set up an All-Ireland SHC semi-final with Kilkenny. Once again, 'the Cats' defeated the men from the Model County. Fitzhenry was later presented with a GPA All-Star.

In 2008, Wexford had a poor start to the championship. After drawing with Dublin, Fitzhenry's side faced Kilkenny in the Leinster SHC final. A trouncing on that occasion meant that Wexford had only one more chance left to remain in the championship. An All-Ireland SHC quarter-final meeting with Waterford, in spite of a great display by Fitzhenry, resulted in a 2–19 to 3–15 defeat.

Two days later there were rumours that Fitzhenry was thinking about retirement from inter-county hurling after 15 years on the panel, though in January 2009 after the former Tipperary hurler Colm Bonnar was appointed as the manager two months ago. Fitzhenry returned to the panel but did not play until their championship opening against Offaly on 30 May where he made a few magnificent saves including a penalty from Shane Dooley. Fitzhenry and his squad were narrowly sent to the All-Ireland SHC qualifiers after a one-point defeat by Dublin at Nowlan Park. Despite getting early knocked out Fitzhenry thought about giving the 2010 hurling championship a go.

Fitzhenry confirmed on 15 February 2010 his retirement from inter-county hurling after serving 17 years in the panel. He was succeeded as Wexford goalkeeper by Noel Carton.

== Coaching career ==
In August 2023, Fitzhenry was named as goalkeeping coach in Keith Rossiter's management team with the Wexford senior hurlers.

== Honours ==
Duffry Rovers

- Wexford Senior Football Championship: 1991, 1992, 1994
- Wexford Minor Hurling Championship: 1991

Wexford

- All-Ireland Senior Hurling Championship: 1996
- Leinster Senior Hurling Championship: 1996, 1997, 2004

Sporting positions
| Preceded by Nigel Higgins | Wexford Senior Hurling Captain; 2007 | Succeeded by Rory Jacob |
