= Colm Kehoe =

Irish hurler

Personal information
- Native name: Colm Mac Eochaidh (Irish)
- Born: 1972 (age 53–54) Bunclody, County Wexford, Ireland

Sport
- Sport: Hurling
- Position: Right corner-back
Club
- Years: Club
- 1990-2012: HWH–Bunclody
Club titles
- Wexford titles: 0
Inter-county
- Years: County
- 1995-2006: Wexford
Inter-county titles
- Leinster titles: 3
- All-Irelands: 1
- NHL: 0
- All Stars: 0

Colm Kehoe (born 1972) is an Irish former hurler. At club level, he played with Half–Way–House/Bunclody and at inter-county level was a member of the Wexford senior hurling team.

== Career ==
Kehoe first played hurling and Gaelic football to a high standard as a student at FCJ Secondary School Bunclody. He lined out in all grades as a dual player during his time there, including the Leinster Colleges SBFC.

At club level, Kehoe first played for the Half–Way–House/Bunclody club in the juvenile and underage grades before progressing to adult level. In a career that lasted over 20 years, he won Wexford IHC medals in 1993, 1995, 2002 and 2010.

Kehoe first appeared on the inter-county scene with Wexford as a member of the minor team in 1990. He made his senior team debut in 1995 and quickly became a regular member of the starting fifteen. Kehoe won a Leinster SHC medal in 1996, before playing at right corner-back when Wexford beat Limerick in the 1996 All-Ireland final.

A second Leinster SHC medal followed for Kehoe in 1997, when Wexford retained the title after a defeat of Kilkenny. He claimed a third Leinster winner's medal as a substitute in 2004. Kehoe retired from inter-county hurling in 2006.

== Honours ==
Half-Way-House/Bunclody

- Wexford Intermediate Hurling Championship: 1993, 1995, 2002, 2010

Wexford

- All-Ireland Senior Hurling Championship: 1996
- Leinster Senior Hurling Championship: 1996, 1997, 2004
