= Half–Way–House/Bunclody GAA =

GAA club in Bunclody, County Wexford, Ireland

Half–Way–House/Bunclody
- Tigh Leath Slí/Bun Clóidí
- County: Wexford
- Nickname: HWH–Bunclody
- Colours: Green and yellow
- Grounds: Church Road, Bunclody

Playing kits
Standard colours

Senior Club Championships
	All Ireland	Leinster champions	Wexford champions
Football:	0	0	2

Half–Way–House/Bunclody GAA is a Gaelic Athletic Association club in Bunclody, County Wexford, Ireland. The club fields teams in both hurling and Gaelic football.

== History ==
Located in the village of Bunclody, on the Carlow-Wexford border, Half–Way–House/Bunclody GAA Club has had sporadic periods of success throughout its history. After winning the Wexford JFC title in 1913, it would be 55 years before the club added a second following victory in 1968. HWH–Bunclody secured senior status in 1976 after winning the Wexford IFC title for the first time.

There was further success in 1982 when HWH–Bunclody won the Wexford SFC title for the first in their history, following a 2–04 to 1–05 defeat of Gusserane O'Rahilly's in the final. The club regained the SFC title in 1985. HWH–Bunclody has also had success on the hurling field, winning four Wexford IHC titles between 1982 and 2010.

== Honours ==
- Wexford Senior Football Championship (2): 1982, 1985
- Wexford Intermediate Football Championship (1): 1976
- Wexford Intermediate Hurling Championship (4): 1982, 1993, 1995, 2002, 2010
- Wexford Junior A Football Championship (3): 1913, 1968, 1986

== Notable players ==
- Colm Kehoe: All-Ireland SHC-winner (1996)
- Aidan Nolan: All-Ireland U21HC runner-up (2014)
