= Harry Kehoe =

Irish hurler

Personal information
- Native name: Anraí Mac Eochaidh (Irish)
- Born: 7 November 1990 (age 35) Clonroche, County Wexford, Ireland
- Occupation: Marketing executive

Sport
- Sport: Hurling
- Position: Right wing-forward
Club
- Years: Club
- 2008-present: Cloughbawn
Club titles
- Wexford titles: 0
College
- Years: College
- Waterford IT
College titles
- Fitzgibbon titles: 1
Inter-county
- Years: County
- 2009-2022: Wexford
Inter-county titles
- Leinster titles: 1
- All-Irelands: 0
- NHL: 0
- All Stars: 0

Harry Kehoe (born 7 November 1990) is an Irish sportsperson. He plays hurling with his local club Cloughbawn and has been a member of the Wexford senior team since 2009.

== Honours ==
Waterford Institute of Technology

- Fitzgibbon Cup: 2014

Cloughbawn

- Wexford Intermediate Hurling Championship: 2019

Wexford

- Leinster Senior Hurling Championship: 2019
