= Noel Carton =

Irish hurler

Personal information
- Native name: Nollaig Mac Artáin (Irish)
- Born: 15 April 1981 (age 45) Clonroche, County Wexford, Ireland

Sport
- Sport: Hurling
- Position: Goalkeeper
Club
- Years: Club
- 1999-present: Cloughbawn
Club titles
- Wexford titles: 0
Inter-county
Years	County	Apps (scores)
2010-2011	Wexford	2 (0-00)
Inter-county titles
- Leinster titles: 0
- All-Irelands: 0
- NHL: 0
- All Stars: 0

Noel Carton (born 15 April 1981 in Clonroche, County Wexford) is an Irish sportsperson. He plays hurling with his local club Cloughbawn and succeeded Damien Fitzhenry as goalkeeper on the Wexford senior inter-county team in 2010. But left the panel in 2011.
