= Ballyhogue GAA =

Irish Gaelic sports club

Ballyhogue GAA is a Gaelic Athletic Association (GAA) club based in Bree, County Wexford, Ireland. Ballyhogue GAA club was founded in 1898 and participates in Gaelic football, hurling, handball and Scór na Óg competitions organised by Wexford GAA. The club shares its facilities with Ballyhogue Camogie and Ballyhogue Ladies Gaelic Football clubs as well as hosting the Bree Athletics Club.

== History ==
The club, which was founded in 1898, won their first Wexford Senior Football Championship title in 1911. This was followed by wins in 1921, 1924, 1931 and 1932.

After a 30 year gap, the club regained the Wexford Senior football title in 1962, and went on to win three consecutive championships between 1962 and 1964. Ballyhogue returned to championship success in the early 1970s, winning further titles in 1971 and 1972. The club dropped to the Intermediate football ranks in the 1980s, winning Intermediate titles in 1986, 2000 and 2004.

Though best known for Gaelic football, Ballyhogue is also involved in hurling, and won Wexford intermediate hurling titles in 1966 and 1972. Ballyhogue provided several players, including Phil Wilson and Larry Swan, to the Olyegate team that won that club's first Wexford Senior County Championship title in 1963. In 2025, Ballyhogue won the Wexford Junior A Hurling Championship, defeating Faythe Harriers in the final.

== Facilities ==
Ballyhogue GAA has two full sized pitches, one of which has championship-grade floodlighting, as well as a training pitch used by underage teams. In addition they have dressing rooms, gym, a handball alley and in recent years have upgraded carparking and added an electronic scoreboard.

The club was also among several Wexford GAA clubs which received sports grant funding in 2008.

== Notable players ==
- Phil Wilson, one of the clubs best-known players, won four Leinster SHC medals with Wexford and claimed an All-Ireland SHC medal in 1968. He also won two National Hurling League medals.

== Honours ==
- Wexford Senior Football championship: 1911, 1921, 1924, 1931, 1932, 1962–1964 (three‑in‑a‑row), 1971, 1972
- Wexford Junior A Hurling Championship: 2025
