= Clongeen GAA =

Gaelic sports club in County Wexford, Ireland

Clongeen
- Cluain Chaoin
- Founded: 1905
- County: Wexford
- Colours: Green and Gold
- Grounds: Fr Wheeler Memorial Park

Playing kits
Standard colours

Senior Club Championships
	All Ireland	Leinster champions	Wexford champions
Football:	0	0	1

Clongeen GAA is a Gaelic Athletic Association club in Clongeen, County Wexford, Ireland. The club fields teams in both hurling and Gaelic football.

== History ==
Located in the village of Clongeen in rural County Wexford, Clongeen GAA Club was founded in 1905. The club spent the majority of its early existence operating in the junior grade. In 1970, Clongeen won the Wexford JAFC title after a defeat of Buffers Alley in a replay. The club's hurlers won a Wexford JAHC title in 1986.

Clongeen secured senior status for the very first time in 1987 when the Wexford IFC title was won. Over 30 years later, the club claimed the Wexford SFC title after a 2-10 to 0-08 defeat of Starlights. Clongeen claimed a second Wexford JAHC title in 2008, before later losing the Leinster Club JHC final to Tullogher–Rosbercon. The club won their third Wexford JAHC title in 2023.

== Honours ==
- Wexford Senior Football Championship: 2007
- Wexford Intermediate Football Championship: 1987
- Wexford Junior A Football Championship: 1970
- Wexford Junior A Hurling Championship: 1986, 2008, 2023
