= David Dunne (hurler) =

Irish hurler

David Dunne (born 1993) is an Irish hurler who plays as a full-forward for the Wexford senior team.

Dunne made his debut on the inter-county scene when he was selected for the Wexford under-21 team in 2014. A runner-up in the 2015 All-Ireland Under-21 Hurling Championship, he later made his debut for the Wexford senior team during the 2016 All-Ireland Senior Hurling Championship.

Dunne plays his club hurling for Davidstown/Courtnacuddy.

== Honours ==
Wexford

- Walsh Cup (1): 2018
- Leinster Under-21 Hurling Championship: 2014
- Leinster Senior Hurling Championship: 2019
