= Rory McCarthy =

Irish hurler (born 1975)

Personal information
- Native name: Ruairi Mac Cárthaigh (Irish)
- Born: 4 September 1975 (age 51) Murrintown, County Wexford, Ireland
- Occupation: School deputy principal
- Height: 5 ft 9 in (175 cm)

Sport
- Sport: Hurling
- Position: Right wing-forward
Club
- Years: Club
- St Martin's
Club titles
- Wexford titles: 2
College
- Years: College
- University of Limerick
College titles
- Fitzgibbon titles: 0
Inter-county
- Years: County
- 1994-2007: Wexford
Inter-county titles
- Leinster titles: 3
- All-Irelands: 1
- NHL: 0
- All Stars: 1

Rory McCarthy (born 4 September 1975) is a retired Irish sportsperson. He played hurling with his local club St Martin's and with the Wexford senior inter-county team. He played in the half-back line.

== Career ==
McCarthy first played hurling and Gaelic football to a high standard as a student at St Peter's College in Wexford. He lined out in all grades as a dual player during his time there, and was part of the team that won the Leinster Colleges SFC title after a defeat of Portarlington CBS in 1992. McCarthy later studied at University of Limerick and lined out in the university's Fitzgibbon Cup team beaten by University College Cork in the 1996 final.

At club level, McCarthy first played for the St Martin's club in the juvenile and underage grades before progressing to adult level. He won his first Wexford SHC title in 1999 following a 1-11 to 1-09 defeat of Rathnure in the final. McCarthy added a second SHC medal to his collection in 2008 after a 1-13 to 1-08 win over Oulart–The Ballagh.

McCarthy first appeared on the inter-county scene with Wexford during a two-year tenure with the minor team. He progressed to under-21 level and won a Leinster U21HC medal before facing defeat by Galway in the 1996 All-Ireland under-21 final. McCarthy made his senior team debut in 1994 and quickly became a regular member of the starting fifteen. He won a Leinster SHC medal in 1996, before playing at right wing-forward when Wexford beat Limerick in the 1996 All-Ireland final. McCarthy ended the season with an All-Star award.

A second Leinster SHC medal followed for McCarthy in 1997, when Wexford retained the title after a defeat of Kilkenny. He claimed a third Leinster winner's medal as a substitute in 2004. McCarthy retired from inter-county hurling in 2007.

== Honours ==
St Peter's College

- Leinster Colleges Senior Football Championship: 1992

St Martin's

- Wexford Senior Hurling Championship: 1999, 2008
- Wexford Intermediate Football Championship: 1994, 2006

Wexford

- All-Ireland Senior Hurling Championship: 1996
- Leinster Senior Hurling Championship: 1996, 1997, 2004
- Leinster Under-21 Hurling Championship: 1996
