= Andrew Shore (hurler) =

Irish hurler

Personal information
- Born: 19 March 1990 (age 36) Wexford, Ireland
- Height: 1.95 m (6 ft 5 in)

Sport
- Sport: Hurling
- Position: Centre Back
Clubs
- Years: Club
- 2008–2010 2011–2014 2015–: Davidstown/Courtnacuddy; Parnells; Davidstown/Courtnacuddy
Inter-county
- Years: County
- 2009–2017: Wexford
Inter-county titles
- NHL: 1

Andrew Shore (born 19 March 1990) is an Irish hurler who plays as a centre-back for the Wexford senior teams.

Born in Davidstown, County Wexford, Shore first arrived on the inter-county scene at the age of seventeen when he first linked up with the Wexford minor team, before later joining the under-21 side. He made his senior debut during the 2009 National Hurling League. Since then Shore has been a regular member of the starting fifteen, and has won one National League (Division 2) medal.

As a member of the Leinster inter-provincial team on a number of occasions, Shore has won one Railway Cup medal. At club level he plays with Davidstown/Courtnacuddy.

== Honours ==
Davidstown-Courtnacuddy

- Wexford Junior Hurling Championship (2): 2007, 2015

Parnells

- Dublin Senior B Hurling Championship (1): 2013

Wexford

- National Hurling League (Division 2) (1): 2010

Leinster

- Railway Cup (1): 2014
