= Ballindaggin =

Village in County Wexford, Ireland

Ballindaggin Baile an Daingin Ballindaggan
- Village
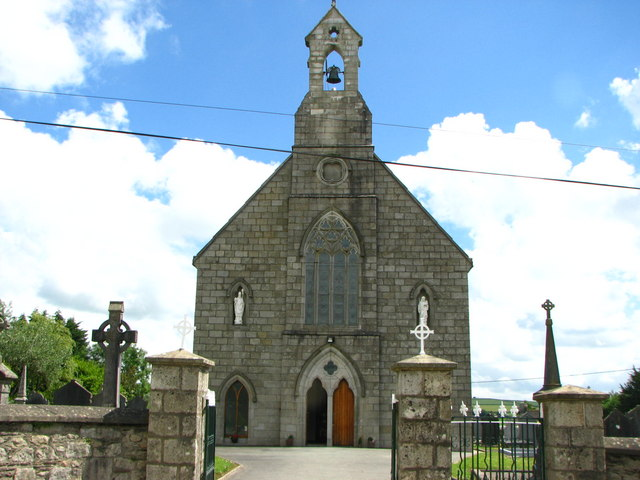
- Saint Colemans Catholic church, Ballindaggan

- Location in Ireland
- Coordinates: 52°34′05″N 6°40′55″W
- Country: Ireland
- Province: Leinster
- County: County Wexford
- Time zone: UTC+0 (WET)
  - Summer (DST): UTC-1 (IST (WEST))
- Irish grid reference: S894471

Ballindaggin, officially Ballindaggan (Irish: Baile an Daingin, meaning 'townland of the stronghold'), is a small village and townland in County Wexford, Ireland. The village gives its name to the electoral division, Ballindaggan ED, which spans the village and its surrounding townlands. Ballindaggin village is 10 km north-west of Enniscorthy.

== Geography ==
Ballindaggan village (commonly and locally known as Ballindaggin) is within a townland and electoral division of the same name. Adjoining townlands include Bola Beg, Coolycarney, Kilcullen, Monbeg and Wheelagower. Ballindaggan lies within the civil parish of Templeshanbo and the historical barony of Scarawalsh. The Catholic parish of Ballindaggin is in the Roman Catholic Diocese of Ferns.

== History ==
Evidence of ancient settlement in the area includes a number of bullaun stone, ringfort and holy well sites in the townlands of Ballindaggan and Bola Beg.

The Roman Catholic church in the village is dedicated to Saint Colman and was opened in 1864. The local Church of Ireland church, in Bola Beg townland in nearby Templeshanbo, was opened in 1815 and also dedicated to Saint Colman.

There is a memorial to the 1798 Rebellion within the village.

== Amenities ==
Ballindaggin is home to a pub/shop (Jordan's) and a restaurant/bar (the Holy Grail). The national (primary) school within the village, known as St. Colmans National School or Ballindaggin National School, had an enrollment of 133 pupils as of 2025. The local Gaelic Athletic Association (GAA) club is Duffry Rovers GAA.

== People ==
- Seamus Rafter (1873–1918), member of the Irish Republican Brotherhood who was involved in the blockade of Enniscorthy during the 1916 Easter Rising

== See also ==
- List of towns and villages in Ireland
- List of memorials to the Irish Rebellion of 1798
