= Craanford Fr O'Regan's GAA =

Craanford Fr O'Regan's
- Áth an Chorráin an tAthair Ó Riagáin
- Founded: 1954
- County: Wexford
- Colours: Blue and white
- Grounds: Craanford Community Field

Playing kits
Standard colours

Craanford Fr O'Regan's GAA is a Gaelic Athletic Association club located in Craanford, County Wexford, Ireland. The club is primarily concerned with the game of hurling.

== History ==
Craanford Fr O'Regan's, originally named Craanford St Brendan's, was established in 1954. The first official club colours were black and red. Two years later, Fr Michael O'Regan became chairperson of the club. He remained in that position until 1968 and the club was later renamed in his honour. The club enjoyed its first success in July 1958 when the Gorey District Hurling Tournament was secured. A decade later Craanford claimed the Wexford JHC title. After the Wexford IHC title was won two years later, the club secured senior status for the first time.

== Honours ==
- Wexford Intermediate Hurling Championship (1): 1970
- Wexford Junior Hurling Championship (1): 1968, 2009
