= Ballygarrett-Réalt na Mara GAA =

Gaelic sports club in County Wexford, Ireland

Ballygarrett-Réalt na Mara
- Baile Ghearóid-Réalt na Mara
- Founded: 1982
- County: Wexford
- Colours: Black and yellow
- Grounds: Ballygarrett

Playing kits
Standard colours

Ballygarrett-Réalt na Mara GAA is a Gaelic Athletic Association club located in County Wexford, Ireland. The club fields teams in both hurling, Gaelic football, camogie and Ladies' Gaelic football.

== History ==
The history of Gaelic games in the Courtown-Ballygarrett area of County Wexford dates back to the 1920s. Réalt na Mara, which was based in Courtown, was noted as a hurling club and competed in the local championships over a 40-year period before its decline. Ballygarrett concentrated on Gaelic football club in the early years but later became a hurling-oriented club. Réalt na Mara was reformed as a Gaelic football club in 1979. Three years later in 1982, Réalt na Mara and Ballygarrett amalgamated to form the present-day club.

Since 1990, the club has enjoyed several championship successes across both codes. Wexford JAFC titles were secured in 1990 and 2002, while the corresponding Wexford JAHC title was won in 2004. This was followed by Wexford IAHC title in 2019.

== Honours ==
- Wexford Intermediate A Hurling Championship (1): 2019
- Wexford Junior A Hurling Championship (1): 2004
- Wexford Junior A Football Championship (2): 1990, 2002

== Notable players ==
- Cathal Dunbar: Leinster SHC-winner (2019)
