= 1960 All-Ireland Junior Hurling Championship =

1960 inter-county junior hurling championship

All Ireland Champions
- Winners: London (4th win)

All Ireland Runners-up
- Runners-up: Carlow

Provincial Champions
- Munster: Cork
- Leinster: Carlow
- Ulster: Down
- Connacht: Roscommon

The 1960 All-Ireland Junior Hurling Championship was the 39th staging of the All-Ireland Junior Championship since its establishment by the Gaelic Athletic Association in 1912.

London entered the championship as the defending champions.

The All-Ireland final replay was played on 23 October 1960 at Croke Park in Dublin, between London and Carlow, in what was their first ever meeting in the final. London won the match by 4–08 to 2–11 to claim their fourth championship title overall and a second title in succession.

== Results ==
=== All-Ireland Junior Hurling Championship ===
==== All-Ireland semi-finals ====
14 August 1960 Semi-final	Carlow	8-16 - 2-02	Down	Dr. Cullen Park

14 August 1960 Semi-final	Cork	7-14 - 5-02	Roscommom	The Mardyke

==== All-Ireland home final ====
11 September 1960 Home final	Carlow	2-15 - 3-05	Cork	Nowlan Park

==== All-Ireland final ====
9 October 1960 Final	London	2-04 - 2-04	Carlow	New Eltham

==== All-Ireland final replay ====
23 October 1960 Final replay	London	4-08 - 2-11	Carlow	Croke Park
