= Piercetown, County Wexford =

Village in County Wexford, Ireland

Piercetown Irish: Baile an Phiarsaigh
- Village
- Location in Ireland
- Coordinates: 52°17′11″N 6°29′23″W
- Country: Ireland
- Province: Leinster
- County: County Wexford

Population (2022)
  - Total: 308
- Time zone: UTC+0 (WET)
  - Summer (DST): UTC-1 (IST (WEST))

Piercetown, or Piercestown, (Irish: Baile an Phiarsaigh) is a village in County Wexford, Ireland. It is 6 km (4 mi) south of the centre of Wexford town. As of October 2025, bus route 390 operates a few times a day to Wexford town.

St. Martin's GAA club is based in the village.
