= Fethard St Mogues GAA Club =

Gaelic football and hurling club from County Wexford

Fethard St Mogues
- Naomh Mhaodhóig Fiodh Árd
- Founded: 1889
- County: Wexford
- Nickname: Super Mogues
- Colours: Red & White
- Grounds: Ramstown
- Coordinates: 52°11′02″N 6°50′15″W

Playing kits
Standard colours

Fethard St Mogues GAA Club is a Gaelic Athletic Association club located in Fethard-on-Sea, County Wexford, Ireland. The club plays in the Wexford GAA club championships, fielding teams in hurling (at Senior and Junior B) and Gaelic football (at Senior and Junior B).

== History ==
Fethard GAA Club was founded in 1889 and was known as "The Hook". This name was changed to Erin Hope in the early 1900s. The first colours worn by the club were canary yellow and green. The club won its first county Junior B football title in 1917 and was then known as Fethard. Jim Byrne, who won six Leinster and four All Ireland senior football medals, was teaching in Poulfur at that time and was involved in getting that team together. Emigration in the 1930s and 1940s saw significant decline at the club. In an effort to rejuvenate the club at this time, the name was changed to its present name St Mogue in honour of the saint to whom the parish is dedicated.

During the 1950s, the club entered 7-a-side competitions but no adult teams were fielded in local championships between 1959 and 1962. During the early 1970s, members of the club reestablished its underage section, with hurling teams now being fielded.

In 1980, the club won its first adult county title in the modern era when the junior B hurlers were victorious. This was followed by the junior A footballers in 1984. The club's underage teams reached a number of county finals and this was reflected with successes at adult level of the 1990s. This included winning junior A hurling in 1992, intermediate football in 1993 and an intermediate hurling title in 1994. At this time, the club was fielding senior teams in both hurling and football and the football team reached won the senior county championship in 1998. They once again reached the Senior football final in 2013, however St. Martin's GAA were victorious in this game. In 2017, the Intermediate A hurling team won the Wexford county championship and entered the Leinster Junior Club Hurling Championship for the first time in its history. They defeated John Locke's in the final to mark an historic first for the club. The team progressed to the All Ireland final after defeating Brother Pearses in London in the quarter-final and Sylane of Galway in the semi-final. The All Ireland Junior final was played in Croke Park on Sunday 4 February 2018, but Fethard were defeated after extra time by Ardmore of Waterford.

In the following season, the club, now playing in the Intermediate grade for the first time in seven years, qualified for the county final. They faced Cloughbawn who had just been relegated from Senior the year previous. The county final finished as a draw, and the replay the following week saw Fethard win to get back to the Senior hurling grade for the first time since 2001. Their Intermediate Leinster campaign began with a win over strongly fancied Kiltale of Meath, but were defeated by Graigue Ballycallan in the Leinster Semi-final.

In 2021, both the hurling and football teams were relegated from Senior to Intermediate, however they bounced back in 2022 with a strong football championship campaign, culminating in a final win over neighbours Horeswood. This lead them onto participation in the Leinster Club Intermediate Football competition, where they advanced through to the final beating The Heath of Laois, Greystones of Wicklow and Mullinavat of Kilkenny. A final in Wexford Park against Dunshaughlin of Meath saw Fethard victorious to claim a historic win, as the first Wexford club to win both Hurling and Football Leinster titles.

== Grounds ==
The club has played in a number of pitches down through the years. In the centenary year of 1989, a decision was made to purchase a suitable pitch. A 13-acre site was purchased in Ramstown townland, and this was developed into two pitches plus dressing rooms and handball alley. Fundraising was undertaken and this included an initiative run in conjunction with the local Church of Ireland of the same name. Further development work has since been carried out, including draining the main pitch in 2003 and the installation of a floodlighting system in 2005, a hurling wall 2008 and a viewing stand in 2009. An Astro pitch has also since been installed.

== Honours ==
=== Football ===
- Leinster Intermediate Club Football Championship - 2022
- Wexford Senior Football Championship - 1998
- Wexford Intermediate Football Championship - 1993, 2022
- Wexford Junior A Football Championship - 1984
- Wexford Junior B Football Championship: - 1917 & 2000

=== Hurling ===
- Leinster Junior Club Hurling Championship - 2017
- Wexford Intermediate Hurling Championship - 1994, 2018, 2025
- Wexford Intermediate A Hurling Championship: - 2017
- Wexford Junior A Hurling Championship: - 1992
- Wexford Junior B Hurling Championship: - 1980 & 1996
