= Ballymurn =

Village in County Wexford, Ireland

Ballymurn Baile Uí Mhurúin
- Village
- Location in Ireland
- Coordinates: 52°26′28″N 6°28′29″W
- Country: Ireland
- Province: Leinster
- County: County Wexford

Population (2014)
  - Total: 524
- Time zone: UTC+0 (WET)
  - Summer (DST): UTC-1 (IST (WEST))

Ballymurn (Irish: Baile Uí Mhurúin) is a village in County Wexford, Ireland. It is around 11 kilometres (7 mi) north of Wexford town, and 10 kilometres (6 mi) south east of Enniscorthy.
