= Horeswood GAA =

Gaelic sports club in County Wexford, Ireland

- Coill de hÓra
- Founded: 1889
- County: Wexford
- Nickname: Woodies
- Colours: Red and Yellow
- Grounds: Ballyfarnogue, campile
- Coordinates: 52°18′41″N 6°57′27″W

Playing kits
Standard colours

Senior Club Championships
	All Ireland	Leinster champions	Wexford champions
Football:	-	-	4

Horeswood GAA is a Gaelic Athletic Association club in County Wexford, Ireland. The club fields teams in Gaelic football, hurling, camogie and Ladies Gaelic football, and participates in competitions organised by Wexford GAA county board.

== History ==
=== Early history ===
William K. Redmond's Football Club was the first GAA club from the parish to affiliate to the Wexford GAA in 1889. The name of the club was changed to Campile Football Club the following year. Campile contested three County Junior Football Finals without success in 1909, 1910 and 1912. Two Campile players, brothers Martin and Jack Howlett, played on the Wexford football team of the 1910s and won several All-Ireland Senior Medals between them.

=== 1920-1966 ===
During the 1920s, hurling was the dominant sport in the Whitechurch area. Three county Junior Hurling Finals were contested by sides from the parish: in 1928 by Shelburne, 1938 by Campile and 1940 by Sean Finns. All three ended in defeat.

The association won its first county title in 1944 when Horeswood United won the Minor title. This was followed by a Junior title in 1947 and a place in the senior ranks.

Horeswood contested three Senior finals, losing to Cloughbawn after a replay in 1952, and falling to St. Aidan's in 1952 and 1954. During this time, a number of club members (including Martin Byrne, John Cummins, Dominic Hearn, John Hearn, Paddy Shannon and Mick O'Hanlon) were selected for the senior Wexford team. Hearn and O'Hanlon won All-Ireland Medals in 1955 and 1955/1956 respectively.

The club returned to the Intermediate hurling grade in 1956. They reached the final in 1959 but lost to Oylegate. They returned to the senior ranks in 1961. A fourth Senior final was contested in 1963 but they lost to Oylegate.

In 1966, a Special Junior title was won, the last adult county hurling title won by the parish. The club returned to the Intermediate grade in 1971. Though the club contested county finals in 1982 and 1986, they did not return to the Senior grade, and dropped a step further in 2002 when re-graded to Junior.

=== 1969-1980 ===
The club joined ranks with neighbouring St. James in the 1960s. Three football titles followed: the Under-16 and Minor double in 1969 and another Under-16 title in 1977.

The club reached the County Junior final in 1972 but lost to Buffers Alley. Two Intermediate finals were later contested: in 1977 (losing to Starlights) and in 1980 (lost to Duffry Rovers).

=== 1986 onwards ===
The club was re-graded back to the Junior ranks in 1986. Two years later, the club won the Junior Championship. This was its first title for 37 years (since 1951).

The club won several Minor titles in the 1980s and 1990s, including in 1989, 1993, 1995 and 1996. Horeswood also won Under 21 titles in 1991, 1994 and 1995, all in the Premier Grade.

The club suffered another final defeat in 1994, losing the Intermediate Final to St. Martins. In 1998, the club returned to Senior football, beating St. James in the final in O'Kennedy Park, New Ross. They reached the first ever Wexford Senior Football Championship final in 2003, losing to Kilanerin–Ballyfad.

In 2005, following a defeat against local rivals Gusserane, the senior team continued in the championship via the losers' route, beating Glynn/Barntown by a goal (1-08 to 0-08). The next qualifying round was against Kilanerin–Ballyfad, which Horeswood again won by a margin of three points; 0-12 to 0-09. After winning the quarterfinal, Horeswood met Castletown Liam Mellows in the semi-final. A goal separated the sides, with a final scoreline of 1-11 to 0-11. Horeswood won the 2005 county final at Wexford Park against Adamstown on a final scoreline of 0-14 to 1-08.

Following the 2005 Wexford Senior Football Championship title, the club went on to win senior titles in 2006, 2009 and 2011.

In 2021, the club won the Wexford Junior Hurling Championship, going on to win the Leinster Junior Club Hurling Championship in 2022.

== Notable players ==
- Tadhg Furlong, later a professional rugby union player
- Sophie Becker, an Olympic splinter who took up athletics when the Horeswood girls team disbanded

== Honours ==
- Leinster Junior Club Hurling Championship (1): 2022
- Wexford Senior Football Championship (4): 2005, 2006, 2009, 2011
- Wexford Intermediate Football Championship (2): 1998, 2018
- Wexford Intermediate Hurling Championship (1): 1961
- Wexford Intermediate A Hurling Championship (1): 2022
- Wexford Junior Football Championships (1): 1988
- Wexford Junior Hurling Championships (3): 1947, 2011, 2021
