= Wexford Intermediate Hurling Championship =

- Code: Hurling
- Founded: 1930; 96 years ago
- Region: Wexford (GAA)
- No. of teams: 12
- Title holders: Cloughbawn (4th title)
- Most titles: Ferns St Aidan's (6 titles)
- Sponsors: The Courtyard Ferns
- Official website: Official website

The Wexford Intermediate Hurling Championship (known for sponsorship reasons as The Courtyard Ferns Intermediate Hurling Championship) is an annual hurling competition contested by mid-tier Wexford GAA clubs. It is the 2nd tier of the Wexford GAA hurling championships.The Wexford County Board of the Gaelic Athletic Association has organised it since 1930.

The title has been won at least once by 38 different clubs. The all-time record-holders are Ferns St Aidan's, who have won the competition six times.

Cloughbawn are the current champion after beating Davidstown/Courtnacuddy in the 2026 final.

== History ==
The Wexford Intermediate Hurling Championship dates back to 1930. It was the third championship to be established in Wexford following the Wexford Senior Hurling Championship in 1889 and the Wexford Junior Hurling Championship in 1903.

No competition was held between 1937 and 1955, owing to its suspension.

The championship was split in two in 2012 with the creation of the new third tier Wexford Intermediate A Hurling Championship.

== Format ==
The series of games are played during the summer and autumn months with the county final currently being played at Wexford Park in October. The championship features a group stage before the top-ranking teams complete a knock-out series of games.

As of 2026, twelve clubs were participating in the Wexford Intermediate Championship.

== Teams ==
=== 2026 Teams ===
Team	Location	Colours	Position in 2026	In championship since	Championship titles	Last championship title
Blackwater St. Brigid’s	Blackwater	Green and Gold	Quarter-Final		1	2008
Buffers Alley	Monamolin	Green, gold and white	Quarter-Final		2	2013
Castletown Liam Mellows	Castletown	Maroon & White	Preliminary Quarter-Final	2025	1	1967
Cloughbawn	Clonroche	Green & White	Champion	2025	4	2026
Craanford Fr O'Regan's	Craanford	Blue and White	Quarter-Final	2024	1	1970
Crossabeg/Ballymurn	Crossabeg and Ballymurn	Green & White	Quarter-Final	2026	2	2020
Davidstown-Courtnacuddy	Davidstown	Red & Gold	Runners-up	2026	1	1963
Horeswood			Relegated		1	1961
Half Way House Bunclody	Bunclody	Green and gold	Preliminary Quarter-Final		5	2010
Kilanerin-Ballyfad	Kilanerin	Red & White	Relegation Final		1	2003
Kilrush-Askamore	Ballyroebuck	Black and Amber	Semi-Final		2	2009
St James’			Semi-Final		0	

== Qualification for subsequent competitions ==
At the end of the championship, the winning team qualify to the subsequent Leinster Intermediate Club Hurling Championship, the winner of which progresses to the All-Ireland Intermediate Club Hurling Championship.

== Honours ==
The Wexford Intermediate Championship is an integral part of the wider Leinster Intermediate Club Hurling Championship. The winners of the Wexford county final join the champions of the other hurling counties to contest the provincial championship. They often do well there with the likes of Ferns St Aidan's and Buffers Alley and Oylegate–Glenbrien among the clubs from Wexford to play in at least one Leinster Championship final after winning the Wexford Intermediate Hurling Championship.

== List of finals ==
=== List of Wexford IHC finals ===
Year	Winners		Runners-up		Location
Year	Club	Score	Club	Score	Location
1930	Ballymurrin				
1931	Glynn				
1932	Cathgal Brughas				
1933	O'Hanrahans				
1934	Glynn				
1935	Sally Beachers				
1936	Ferns–Ballingale		Cloughbawn		
1937-1955	No competition				
1956	Faythe Harriers		Geraldine O'Hanrahans		
1957	Geraldine O'Hanrahans		Shelmaliers		
1958	Ferns St Aidan's				
1959	Oylegate–Glenbrien		Horeswood		
1960	Shamrocks		Camross		
1961	Horeswood		Cloughbawn		
1962	Hollow Rangers		Buffers Alley		
1963	Davidstown/Courtnacuddy		Buffers Alley		
1964	St Martin's				
1965	Buffers Alley		Gorey Wolfe Tones		
1966	Ballyhogue		Liam Mellows		
1967	Liam Mellows				
1968	Oulart–The Ballagh		Shelmaliers		
1969	Duffry Rovers				
1970	Craanford St Brendan's				
1971	Adamstown				
1972	Ballyhogue				
1973	Cloughbawn		St Martin's		
1974	Naomh Éanna		Crossabeg–Ballymurn		
1975	Geraldine O'Hanrahans		Oylegate–Glenbrien		
1976	Askamore				
1977	St Martin's		Crossabeg–Ballymurn		
1978	Duffry Rovers				
1979	Ferns St Aidan's				
1980	Monageer–Boolavogue				
1981	Rathnure		Rathgarogue-Cushinstown		
1982	HWH–Bunclody		Horeswood		
1983	Marshalstown				
1984	Ferns St Aidan's		Askamore		
1985	Oulart–The Ballagh				
1986	Monageer–Boolavogue		Horeswood		
1987	Glynn–Barntown		Crossabeg–Ballymurn		
1988	Crossabeg–Ballymurn		Shamrocks		
1989	Ferns St Aidan's				
1990	Naomh Éanna		Shelmaliers		
1991	Rathgarogue–Cushinstown		Fethard St Mogue's		
1992	Oylegate–Glenbrien				
1993	HWH–Bunclody				
1994	Fethard St Mogue's				
1995	HWH–Bunclody				
1996	Shamrocks				
1997	Shelmaliers		Geraldine O'Hanrahans		
1998	Ferns St Aidan's				
1999	St Anne's		Admastown		
2000	Monageer–Boolavogue				
2001	Naomh Éanna		Rathgarogue-Cushinstown		
2002	HWH–Bunclody		Askamore		
2003	Ballyfad		St. Mary's, Rosslare		
2004	St Patrick's		Ferns St Aidan's		
2005	Marshalstown		Askamore		
2006	Rathgarogue–Cushinstown		Geraldine O'Hanrahans		
2007	Ferns St Aidan's		Rathnure		
2008	Blackwater		Rathnure		
2009	Askamore		HWH–Bunclody		
2010	HWH–Bunclody		Shamrocks		
2011	Adamstown		Duffry Rovers		
2012	Oylegate–Glenbrien		HWH–Bunclody		
2013	Buffers Alley		Naomh Éanna		
2014	Shamrocks	3-13 (2-10)	Duffry Rovers	1-16 (0-16)	Innovate Wexford Park
2015	Naomh Éanna	1-15	Crossabeg–Ballymurn	2-11	Bellefield
2016	Oylegate–Glenbrien	1-14	Adamstown	0-10	Innovate Wexford Park
2017	St Anne's, Rathangan	2-10	Crossabeg–Ballymurn	1-12	Innovate Wexford Park
2018	Fethard St Mogue's	0-14 (3-16)	Cloughbawn	1-09 (2-19)	Innovate Wexford Park
2019	Cloughbawn	3-14	HWH–Bunclody	0-17	Innovate Wexford Park
2020	Crossabeg–Ballymurn	2-17	Buffers Alley	0-16	Chadwick's Wexford Park
2021	Oylegate–Glenbrien	2-08	HWH–Bunclody	1-05	Chadwick's Wexford Park
2022	Oulart–The Ballagh		Taghmon-Camross		
2023	Cloughbawn		St. James		
2024	Rathnure		St. James		
2025	Fethard St Mogue's	0-20	Cloughbawn	1-15	
2026	Cloughbawn	0-15	Davidstown/Courtnacuddy	1-11	Chadwick's Wexford Park

== Wins listed by club ==
#	Club	Wins	Years won
1	Ferns St Aidan's	6	1958, 1979, 1984, 1989, 1998, 2007
2	HWH/Bunclody	5	1982, 1993, 1995, 2002, 2010
2	Oylegate–Glenbrien	5	1959, 1992, 2012, 2016, 2021
3	Naomh Éanna	4	1974, 1990, 2001, 2015
3	Cloughbawn	4	1973, 2019, 2023, 2026
4	Shamrocks	3	1960, 1996, 2014
4	Monageer–Boolavogue	3	1980, 1986, 2000
4	Oulart–The Ballagh	3	1968, 1985, 2022
4	Fethard St Mogue's	3	1994, 2018, 2025
5	Glynn	2	1931, 1934
5	Geraldine O'Hanrahans	2	1957, 1975
5	St Martin's	2	1964, 1977
5	Buffers Alley	2	1965, 2013
5	Ballyhogue	2	1966, 1972
5	Duffry Rovers	2	1969, 1978
5	Adamstown	2	1971, 2011
5	Marshalstown	2	1983, 2005
5	Rathgarogue–Cushinstown	2	1991, 2006
5	Askamore	2	1976, 2009
5	St Anne's, Rathangan	2	1999, 2017
5	Rathnure	2	1981, 2024
5	Crossabeg–Ballymurn	2	1988, 2020
6	Ballymurrin	1	1930
6	Cathal Brughas	1	1932
6	O'Hanrahan's	1	1933
6	Sally Beachers	1	1935
6	Ferns–Ballingale	1	1936
6	Faythe Harriers	1	1956
6	Horeswood	1	1961
6	Hollow Rangers	1	1962
6	Davidstown/Courtnacuddy	1	1963
6	Liam Mellows	1	1967
6	Craanford St Brendan's	1	1970
6	Glynn–Barntown	1	1987
6	Shelmaliers	1	1997
6	Kilanerin-Ballyfad	1	2003
6	St Patrick's	1	2004
6	Blackwater	1	2008

== Records and statistics ==
=== Teams ===
==== Gaps ====
Top ten longest gaps between successive championship titles:

- 48 years: Buffers Alley (1965-2013)
- 46 years: Cloughbawn (1973-2019)
- 43 years: Rathnure (1981-2024)
- 40 years: Adamstown (1971-2011)
- 37 years: Oulart–The Ballagh (1985-2022)
- 36 years: Shamrocks (1960-1996)
- 33 years: Oylegate–Glenbrien (1959-1992)
- 33 years: Askamore (1976-2009)
- 24 years: Fethard St Mogue's (1994-2018)
- 22 years: Marshalstown (1983-2005)

== See also ==
- Wexford Senior Hurling Championship (Tier 1)
- Wexford Intermediate A Hurling Championship (Tier 3)
- Wexford Junior Hurling Championship (Tier 4)
- Wexford Junior A Hurling Championship (Tier 5)
- Wexford Junior B Hurling Championship (Tier 6)
