= Duffry Rovers GAA =

Gaelic games club in County Wexford, Ireland

Duffry Rovers
- Fannaire na Dubh Tíre
- Founded: 1961
- County: Wexford
- Colours: Green, white and gold

Playing kits
Standard colours

Senior Club Championships
	All Ireland	Leinster champions	Wexford champions
Football:	0	0	8
Hurling:	0	0	0

Duffry Rovers GAA is a Gaelic Athletic Association club located in the centre of Ballindaggin, Caim and Kiltealy villages in County Wexford, Ireland. The club fields teams in Gaelic football, hurling and camogie.

== Honours ==
- Wexford Senior Football Championship (8):
  - 1986, 1987, 1988, 1989, 1990, 1991, 1992, 1994
- Wexford Intermediate Football Championship (1)
  - 1980
- Wexford Intermediate A Football Championships: (1)
  - 2016
- Wexford Intermediate Hurling Championships: (2)
  - 1969, 1978
- Wexford Junior Football Championships: (1)
  - 1977
- Wexford Junior Hurling Championship: (1)
  - 2024
- Wexford Under-21 Football Championships: (5)
  - 1979 (with Marshalstown), 1987, 1988, 1989, 1990
- Wexford Under-21 Hurling Championships: (6)
  - 1970 (with Rathnure), 1971 (with Rathnure), 1976 (with Marshalstown), 1978 (with Marshalstown), 1979 (with Marshalstown), 1980 (with Marshalstown), 1981 (with Marshalstown)
- Wexford Minor Football Championships: (1)
  - 1978 (with Marshalstown)
- Wexford Minor Hurling Championships: (3)
  - 1973 (with Rathnure), 1978 (with Marshalstown), 1991

== Notable players ==
- Damien Fitzhenry
- Robert Frayne
