= Wexford Junior Hurling Championship =

Annual hurling competition

- Code: Hurling
- Founded: 1903; 123 years ago
- Region: Wexford (GAA)
- No. of teams: 12
- Title holders: Rathnure (5th title)
- First winner: Rathgarogue
- Most titles: Ferns St Aidan's, Rathnure (5 titles)
- Official website: Official website

The Wexford Junior Hurling Championship is an annual hurling competition contested by lower-tier Wexford GAA clubs. It is the 4th tier of the Wexford GAA hurling championships. The Wexford County Board of the Gaelic Athletic Association has organised it since 1903.

The all-time record-holders are Ferns St Aidan's and Rathnure, who have won the competition five times.

== History ==
The Wexford Junior Hurling Championship dates back to 1903. It was the second championship to be established in Wexford following the Wexford Senior Hurling Championship in 1889.

No competition was held in 1906 or in 1915. There was also no competition between 1917 and 1923. No competition was held in 1925 either.

With the introduction of the Intermediate Championship in 1930 and the Intermediate A Championship in 2012 it became the 4th tier championship in Wexford

== Format ==
The series of games are played during the summer and autumn months with the county final currently being played in October. The championship features a group stage before the top-ranking teams complete a knock-out series of games.

Twelve clubs currently participate in the Wexford Junior Championship.

== Honours ==
The Wexford Junior Championship is an integral part of the wider Leinster Junior Club Hurling Championship. The winners of the Wexford county final join the champions of the other hurling counties to contest the provincial championship. They often do well there with the likes of Fethard St Mogues among the clubs from Wexford to win at least one Leinster Championship after winning the Wexford Junior Hurling Championship.

== List of finals ==
Year	Winner	Score	Opponent	Score	Location
1903	Rathgarogue				
1904	Oulart				
1905	Buffers Alley				
1906	No competition				
1907	Wolfe Tones, Gorey				
1908	Ballymurin				
1909	Glenbrien				
1910	New Ross				
1911	Davidstown				
1912	Ferns St Aidan's				
1913	Rapparees				
1914	Crossabeg				
1915	No competition				
1916	Ballymurin		Adamstown		
1917	No competition				
1918	No competition				
1919	No competition				
1920	No competition				
1921	No competition				
1922	No competition				
1923	No competition				
1924	St Anne's				
1925	No competition				
1926	Adamstown				
1927	Caim				
1928	Buffers Alley		Shelburne		
1929	Adamstown				
1930	Glynn		Gorey Wolfe Tones		
1931	O'Hanrahans, New Ross				
1932	Ferns St Aidan's				
1933	Ballingale				
1934	St Mary's, Rosslare		Cloughbawn		
1935	Cloughbawn		Adamstown		
1936	Blackwater		Killinick		
1937	O'Hanrahans, New Ross				
1938	Starlights		Campile		
1939	St Fintan's		Rathnure		
1940	Rathnure		Sean Finn's, Horeswood		
1941	Caim		Camross		
1942	Camross		Oylegate		
1943	Oylegate		St. Ibar's, Castlebridge		
1944	St Fintan's				
1945	St Aidan's Enniscorthy				
1946	Cloughbawn		Horeswood		
1947	Horeswood		Gorey Wolfe Tones		
1948	St Martin's		Oulart–The Ballagh		
1949	Camross				
1950	Insurgents, New Ross		Caim/Kiltealy		
1951	Buffers Alley				
1952	Ferns St Aidan's		Faythe Harriers		
1953	Faythe Harriers				
1954	Shelmaliers				
1955	Oylegate–Glenbrien				
1956	Ferns St Aidan's				
1957	Blackwater		St. Brendan's, Davidstown		
1958	Ferns St Aidan's		Camross		
1959	Shamrocks		Camross		
1960	Hollow Rangers		Cushinstown		
1961	Davidstown/Courtnacuddy		Shelmaliers		
1962	Our Lady's Island		Oulart–The Ballagh		
1963	St Martin's		Blackwater		
1964	Liam Mellows		Na Fianna		
1965	Ballyhogue				
1966	Shelmaliers		Oulart–The Ballagh		
1967	Oulart–The Ballagh				
1968	Craanford St Brendan's				
1969	Askamore		St. Fintan's		
1970	Adamstown				
1971	Ballyhogue				
1972	Cloughbawn		Crossabeg Ballymurn		
1973	Marshalstown				
1974	Monageer–Boolavogue		St. Patrick's		
1975	Blackwater		St. Patrick's		
1976	Glynn–Barntown		Rathgarogue-Cushinstown		
1977	St Anne's				
1978	St Fintan's				
1979	Rathgarogue–Cushinstown				
1980	Cloughbawn		St James, Ramsgrange		
1981	Rathnure		Fethard St. Mogues		
1982	Buffers Alley				
1983	Rathnure				
1984	Clonee				
1985	Shamrocks				
1986	Clongeen				
1987	Taghmon-Camross				
1988	Shelmaliers				
1989	Faythe Harriers				
1990	Davidstown/Courtnacuddy		Ballygarrett-Réalt na Mara		
1991	St Patrick's				
1992	Fethard St. Mogues				
1993	Rapparees				
1994	St Patrick's				
1995	Geraldine O'Hanrahans		St Anne's		
1996	St Anne's		Rosslare St. Mary's		
1997	Gusserane				
1998	Ballyfad				
1999	St Mary's, Rosslare				
2000	Askamore				
2001	Blackwater				
2002	St Martin's		Bannow-Ballymitty		
2003	Bannow–Ballymitty				
2004	Ballygarrett-Réalt na Mara		Our Lady's Island		
2005	Oulart–The Ballagh		Davidstown/Courtnacuddy		
2006	Our Lady's Island		Shelmaliers		
2007	Davidstown/Courtnacuddy		Adamstown		
2008	Clongeen		Craanford		
2009	Craanford St Brendan's		Taghmon-Camross		
2010	Adamstown		Buffers Alley		
2011	Horeswood		Shelmaliers		
2012	Crossabeg/Ballymurn		Rapparees		
2013	Our Lady's Island				
2014	St James		Taghmon-Camross		
2015	Taghmon-Camross		Shelmaliers		
2016	Shelmaliers		Gusserane O'Rahilly's		
2017	Gusserane O'Rahilly's		Rapparees		
2018	Rathnure	1-15	Rapparees	1-06	St Patrick's Park, Enniscorthy
2019	St Mary's Rosslare		Glynn–Barntown		
2020	St Martin's		Horeswood		
2021	Horeswood		Kilmore		
2022	Davidstown/Courtnacuddy		Glynn–Barntown		
2023	Clongeen		St. Patrick's		
2024	Duffry Rovers		Castletown Liam Mellows		
2025	Marshalstoen-Castledockrell	2-16	Rathnure	1-16	
2026	Rathnure	1-17	Naomh Eanna	1-12	Chadwicks Wexford Park

== Wins listed by club ==
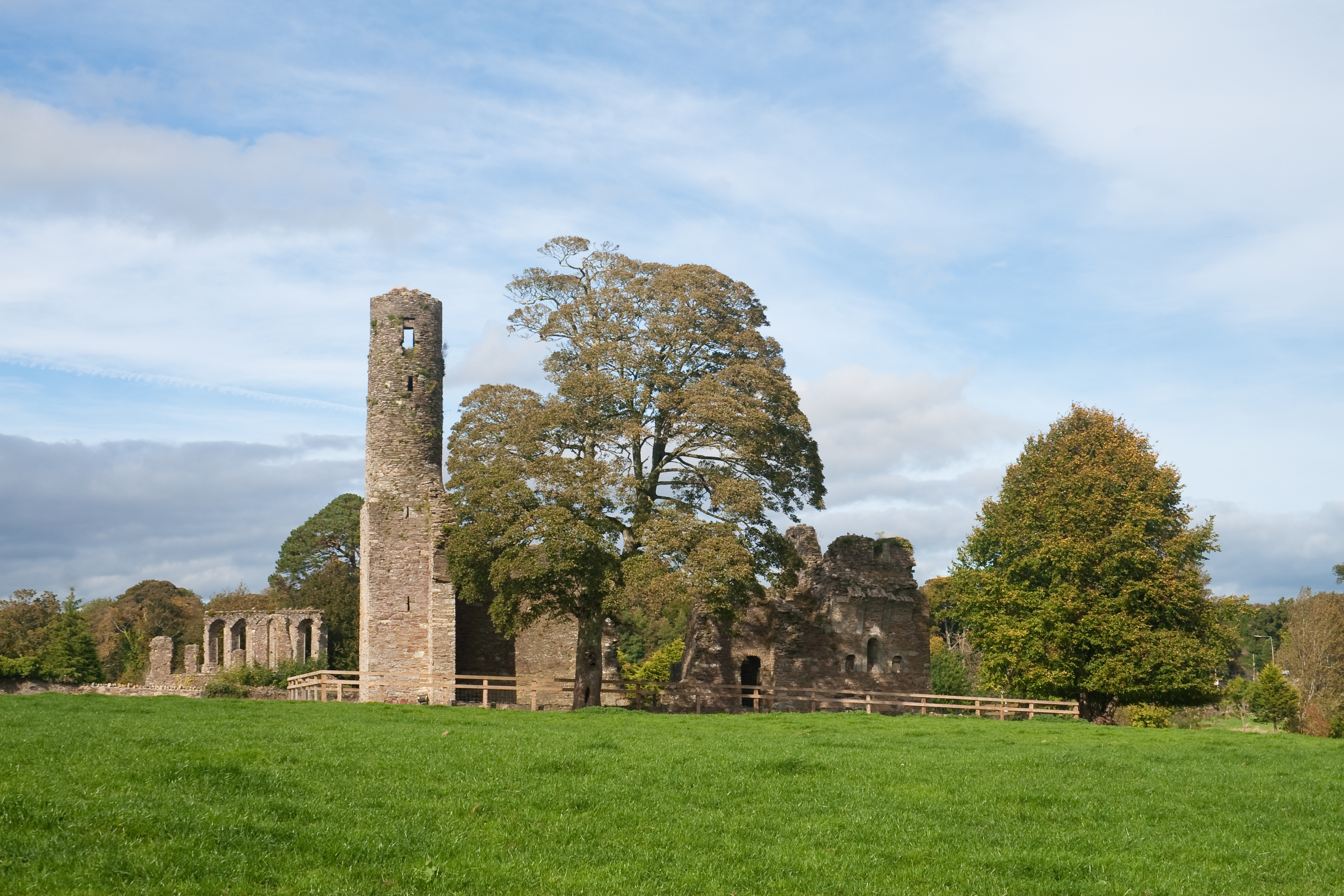
Ferns St Aidan's have the most JHC titles.

Titles	Club	Championships won
5	Ferns St Aidan's	1912, 1932, 1952, 1956, 1958
5	Rathnure	1940, 1981, 1983, 2018, 2026
4	Buffers Alley	1905, 1928, 1951, 1982
4	Cloughbawn	1935, 1946, 1972, 1980
4	Blackwater	1936, 1957, 1975, 2001
4	Adamstown	1926, 1929, 1970, 2010
4	St Martin's	1948, 1963, 2002, 2020
4	Shelmaliers	1954, 1966, 1988, 2016
4	Davidstown/Courtnacuddy	1961, 1990, 2007, 2022
3	St Fintan's	1939, 1944, 1978
3	St Anne's	1924, 1977, 1996
3	St Mary's, Rosslare	1934, 1999, 2019
3	Our Lady's Island	1962, 2006, 2013
3	Clongeen	1986, 2008, 2023
3	Horeswood	1947, 2011, 2021
2	Ballymurin	1908, 1916
2	Rapparees	1913, 1993
2	Caim	1927, 1941
2	O'Hanrahans, New Ross	1931, 1937
2	Camross	1942, 1949
2	Faythe Harriers	1953, 1989
2	Shamrocks	1959, 1985
2	Ballyhogue	1965, 1971
2	Askamore	1969, 2000
2	St Patrick's	1991, 1994
2	Oulart–The Ballagh	1967, 2005
2	Craanford St Brendan's	1968, 2009
2	Taghmon-Camross	1987, 2015
2	Gusserane	1997, 2017
1	Rathgarogue	1903
1	Oulart	1904
1	Wolfe Tones, Gorey	1907
1	Glenbrien (1)	1909
1	New Ross	1910
1	Davidstown	1911
1	Crossabeg	1914
1	Glynn	1930
1	Ballingale	1933
1	Starlights	1938
1	Oylegate	1943
1	St Aidan's, Enniscorthy	1945
1	Insurgents, New Ross	1950
1	Oylegate–Glenbrien	1955
1	Hollow Rangers	1960
1	Liam Mellows	1964
1	Marshalstown	1973
1	Monageer–Boolavogue	1974
1	Glynn–Barntown	1976
1	Rathgarogue–Cushinstown	1979
1	Clonee	1984
1	Fethard	1992
1	Geraldine O'Hanrahans	1995
1	Ballyfad	1998
1	Bannow–Ballymitty	2003
1	Ballygarrett-Réalt-na-Mara	2004
1	Crossabeg/Ballymurn	2012
1	St James	2014
1	Duffry Rovers	2024
1	Marshalstoen-Castledockrell	2025

== See also ==
- Wexford Senior Hurling Championship (Tier 1)
- Wexford Intermediate Hurling Championship (Tier 2)
- Wexford Intermediate A Hurling Championship (Tier 3)
- Wexford Junior A Hurling Championship (Tier 5)
- Wexford Junior B Hurling Championship (Tier 6)
