= Gusserane O'Rahilly's GAA =

Gaelic games club in County Wexford, Ireland

Gusserane O'Rahilly's
- County: Wexford
- Colours: Blue and Gold

Playing kits
Standard colours

Senior Club Championships
	All Ireland	Leinster champions	Wexford champions
Football:	-	-	6

Gusserane O'Rahilly's club is a Gaelic Athletic Association club located in Ballycullane, County Wexford, Ireland. The club fields teams in both hurling and Gaelic football in Wexford GAA competitions.

The club is one of a number that use the "O'Rahilly's" name (after Michael Rahilly from County Kerry), with others existing in places such as Drogheda, Monaghan and Tralee.

Liam Fardy, who managed the Wexford senior football team between 1991 and 1995, and who also managed the county's under-21 football team, is from Gusserane.

The club won a first Wexford Senior Football Championship title for 41 years in 2016.

It contested the 2021 Wexford SFC final but lost.

== Honours ==
- Wexford Senior Football Championships (6): 1945, 1946, 1947, 1954, 1975, 2016
- Wexford Intermediate Football Championship (1): 1997
- Wexford Intermediate A Hurling Championship (2): 2020, 2026
- Wexford Junior Hurling Championship (1): 2017
- Wexford Junior Football Championships (4): 1926, 1944, 1965, 2017
- Wexford Under-21 Football Championships (4): 1969, 1970, 1977, 1983 (all with Clongeen)
- Wexford Minor Football Championships (4): 1943, 1944, 1945, 1963
