= Wexford Senior Football Championship =

Irish Gaelic football league

- Irish: Craobh Sinsear Peile
- Founded: 1886
- Title holders: Kilanerin–Ballyfad (8th title)
- Most titles: Castletown Liam Mellows (14 titles)
- Sponsors: Dominic Smith Electrical

The Wexford Senior Football Championship is an annual Gaelic football competition contested by top-tier Wexford GAA clubs. The Wexford County Board of the Gaelic Athletic Association has organised it since 1886.

The 2026 champions are Kilanerin–Ballyfad who beat St Martin's in the final.

== Honours ==
The winners of the Wexford Championship qualify to represent their county in the Leinster Senior Club Football Championship, the winner of which progresses to the All-Ireland Senior Club Football Championship.

== List of finals ==
(r) = replay

Year	Winner	Score	Opponent	Score
1886	St Mary's Rosslare			
1887	Castlebridge			
1888	No competition			
1889	Blues & Whites			
1890	Blues & Whites			
1891	No competition			
1892	No competition			
1893	No competition			
1894	Young Irelands			
1895	St Johns Volunteers		Young Irelands	
1896	St Patrick's, Wexford			
1897	Ballymurn			
1898	St Johns Volunteers			
1899	Gymnasiums, New Ross			
1900	Unfinished			
1901	Camblin Rovers			
1902	Abandoned			
1903	Slaney Harriers			
1904	Slaney Harriers			
1905	Wexford United			
1906	No competition			
1907	Red Rapparees			
1908	Red Rapparees			
1909	Red Rapparees		Sarsfields	
1910	Faughs, Wexford			
1911	Ballyhogue			
1912	Rapparees			
1913	Rapparees			
1914	Blues & Whites			
1915	Geraldines, New Ross			
1916	Blues & Whites			
1917	No competition			
1918	No competition			
1919	No competition			
1920	No competition			
1921	Ballyhogue		Gusserane O'Rahilly's	
1922	No competition			
1923	No competition			
1924	Ballyhogue			
1925	No competition			
1926	Wexford United			
1927	Starlights		Ballyhogue	
1928	Starlights		Ballyhogue	
1929	Starlights		Ballyhogue	
1930	St Fintan's			
1931	Ballyhogue			
1932	Ballyhogue			
1933	Starlights		Sarsfields	
1934	Sarsfields			
1935	Sarsfields			
1936	Starlights			
1937	Starlights			
1938	No competition			
1939	St John's Volunteers		New Ross District	
1940	St John's Volunteers		Camross	
1941	St John's Volunteers		Enniscorthy Emmetts	
1942	St John's Volunteers		Camross	
1943	St John's Volunteers		Enniscorthy Emmetts	
1944	Enniscorthy Emmetts		St John's Volunteers	
1945	Gusserane O'Rahilly's		Ballyhogue–Camross	
1946	Gusserane O'Rahilly's		Enniscorthy District	
1947	Gusserane O'Rahilly's		St Aidan's Ballymitty	
1948	St John's Volunteers		Slaney Harriers	
1949	St John's Volunteers		St Aidan's Ballymitty	
1950	St Aidan's Enniscorthy		Camross	
1951	St Aidan's Enniscorthy		St John's Volunteers	
1952	Rathnure		Gusserane O'Rahilly's	
1953	St John's Volunteers		Rathnure	
1954	Gusserane O'Rahilly's	1-05	Ferns	1-03
1955	St Munn's, Taghmon		Ferns	
1956	St John's Volunteers		Ballyhogue	
1957	St Munn's, Taghmon		St Mary's, Enniscorthy	
1958	St Munn's, Taghmon	w/o	St Mary's, Enniscorthy	scr
1959	Faythe Harriers	0-15	St. Dympna's, Enniscorthy	1-06
1960	Faythe Harriers	1-04	St. Mogue's, Enniscorthy	0-01
1961	Sarsfields	2-03	Starlights	1-01
1962	Ballyhogue	1-08	Sarsfields	1-04
1963	Ballyhogue	0-10	Enniscorthy Starlights	0-07
1964	Ballyhogue	1-12	Enniscorthy Starlights	0-04
1965	Castletown Liam Mellows	1-05, 0-09 (R), 1-14 (2R)	Ballyhogue	1-05, 1-06 (R), 1-05 (2R)
1966*	Castletown Liam Mellows	0-12	Ballyhogue	1-09
1967	Sarsfields	0-13	Castletown Liam Mellows	1-08
1968	St Anne's	1-10	Castletown Liam Mellows	1-06
1969	Castletown Liam Mellows	1-06	Ballyhogue/Davidstown	0-05
1970	Castletown Liam Mellows	0-05, 2-09(r), 2-13(r)	Ballyhogue	0-05, 2-09(r), 0-06(r)
1971	Ballyhogue	0-09	Castletown Liam Mellows	0-07
1972	Ballyhogue	1-08	Rathnure	2-04
1973	Castletown Liam Mellows	0-09	Ballyhogue	1-04
1974	Kilanerin–Ballyfad	1-03	Rathnure	1-02
1975	Gusserane O'Rahilly's	1-09	St Anne's/St Patrick's	1-05
1976	Castletown Liam Mellows	5-02	Rathnure	0-12
1977	Wexford District	3-07	HWH–Bunclody	0-07
1978	Castletown Liam Mellows	w/o	Wexford District	scr
1979	Castletown Liam Mellows	0-08, 4-06 (r)	Starlights	0-08, 2-08 (r)
1980	St Fintan's	0-06	HWH–Bunclody	0-05
1981	Castletown Liam Mellows	3-03	HWH–Bunclody	2-04
1982	HWH–Bunclody	2-04	Gusserane O'Rahilly's	1-05
1983	Starlights	0-08	Wexford District	2-01
1984	Sarsfields	1-04	Duffry Rovers	0-03
1985	HWH–Bunclody	2-08	Gusserane O'Rahilly's	1-10
1986	Duffry Rovers	2-10	Gusserane O'Rahilly's	2-05
1987	Duffry Rovers	3-05	Sarsfields	0-12
1988	Duffry Rovers	0-10	Starlights	0-08
1989	Duffry Rovers	1-09	Glynn–Barntown	1-05
1990	Duffry Rovers	0-13	Glynn–Barntown	0-08
1991	Duffry Rovers	2-06	Glynn–Barntown	0-05
1992	Duffry Rovers	4-04	St Anne's	1-05
1993	Kilanerin–Ballyfad	2-04, 1-05 (r)	Sarsfields	1-07, 1-03 (r)
1994	Duffry Rovers	1-07	Starlights	2-02
1995	Kilanerin–Ballyfad	1-09	Castletown Liam Mellows	0-07
1996	Glynn–Barntown	2-03	Kilanerin–Ballyfad	0-07
1997	Kilanerin–Ballyfad	2-12	Adamstown	0-07
1998	St Mogues, Fethard	1-09	Gusserane O'Rahilly's	1-06
1999	Kilanerin–Ballyfad	1-13	Castletown Liam Mellows	1-07
2000	St Anne's	0-07	Starlights	0-04
2001	St Anne's	3-08	Kilanerin–Ballyfad	0-13
2002	Starlights	0-08, 0-13 (r)	Duffry Rovers	0-08, 1-06 (r)
2003	Kilanerin–Ballyfad	1-23	Horeswood	0-06
2004	Starlights	1-10	Sarsfields	0-06
2005	Horeswood	0-14	Adamstown	1-08
2006	Horeswood	1-06, 0-15	Castletown Liam Mellows	0-09, 0-10
2007	Clongeen	2-10	Starlights	0-08
2008	Kilanerin–Ballyfad	1-12	Gusserane O'Rahilly's	0-12
2009	Horeswood	3-11	St Anne's	1-15
2010	Castletown Liam Mellows	0-12	Kilanerin–Ballyfad	0-09
2011	Horeswood	3-09	Castletown Liam Mellows	0-11
2012	St Anne's	2-14	Castletown Liam Mellows	0-08
2013	St Martin's	1-08	St Mogues, Fethard	0-05
2014	St Anne's	1-06	Gusserane O'Rahilly's	0-08
2015	St James	0-11	St Martin's	1-06
2016	Gusserane O'Rahilly's	0-11	Glynn–Barntown	0-10
2017	Starlights	0-17	St Martin's	1-08
2018	Shelmaliers	4-14	Kilanerin–Ballyfad	1-07
2019	Castletown Liam Mellows	3-16	Gusserane O'Rahilly's	2-10
2020	Starlights	1-11	Castletown Liam Mellows	1-09
2021	Shelmaliers	2-11	Gusserane O'Rahilly's	1-10
2022	Castletown Liam Mellows	0-13	Shelmaliers	0-09
2023	Shelmaliers	1-12	Castletown Liam Mellows	1-11
2024	Castletown Liam Mellows	0-09	Gusserane O'Rahilly's	0-06
2025	Castletown Liam Mellows	0-14	Shelmaliers	1-07
2026	Kilanerin–Ballyfad	1-15	St Martin's	0-12

== Wins listed by club ==
#	Club	Wins	Years won
1	Castletown Liam Mellows	14	1965, 1966, 1969, 1970, 1973, 1976, 1978, 1979, 1981, 2010, 2019, 2022, 2024, 2025
2	St John's Volunteers	11	1895, 1898, 1939, 1940, 1941, 1942, 1943, 1948, 1949, 1953, 1956
2	Starlights	11	1927, 1828, 1929, 1933, 1936, 1937, 1983, 2002, 2004, 2017, 2020
4	Ballyhogue	10	1911, 1921, 1924, 1931, 1932, 1962, 1963, 1964, 1971, 1972
5	Kilanerin–Ballyfad	8	1974, 1993, 1995, 1997, 1999, 2003, 2008, 2026
5	Duffry Rovers	8	1986, 1987, 1988, 1989, 1990, 1991, 1992, 1994
7	Gusserane O'Rahilly's	6	1945, 1946, 1947, 1954, 1975, 2016
8	Rapparees	5	1907, 1908, 1909, 1912, 1913
8	Sarsfields	5	1934, 1935, 1961, 1967, 1984
8	St Anne's (Rathangan)	5	1968, 2000, 2001, 2012, 2014
11	Horeswood	4	2005, 2006, 2009, 2011
11	Blues & Whites (Wexford)	4	1889, 1890, 1914, 1916
11	Gymnasiums (New Ross)	4	1899, 1900, 1901, 1902
14	St Munn's, Taghmon	3	1955, 1957, 1958
14	Shelmaliers	3	2018, 2021, 2023
16	Slaney Harriers, Enniscorthy	2	1903, 1904
16	Wexford United	2	1905, 1926
16	St Fintan's	2	1930, 1980
16	St Aidan's Enniscorthy	2	1950, 1951
16	Faythe Harriers	2	1959, 1960
16	HWH–Bunclody	2	1982, 1985
22	St Mary's Rosslare	1	1886
22	Castlebridge	1	1887
22	Young Irelands, Wexford	1	1894
22	St Patrick's, Wexford	1	1896
22	Ballymurrin	1	1897
22	Faughs (Wexford)	1	1910
22	New Ross Geraldines	1	1915
22	Emmetts (Enniscorthy)	1	1944
22	Rathnure	1	1952
22	Wexford District	1	1977
22	Glynn–Barntown	1	1996
22	St Mogues, Fethard	1	1998
22	Clongeen	1	2007
22	St Martin's	1	2013
22	St James	1	2015
