= Clongeen =

Village in County Wexford, Ireland

Clongeen Cluain Caoin
- Village
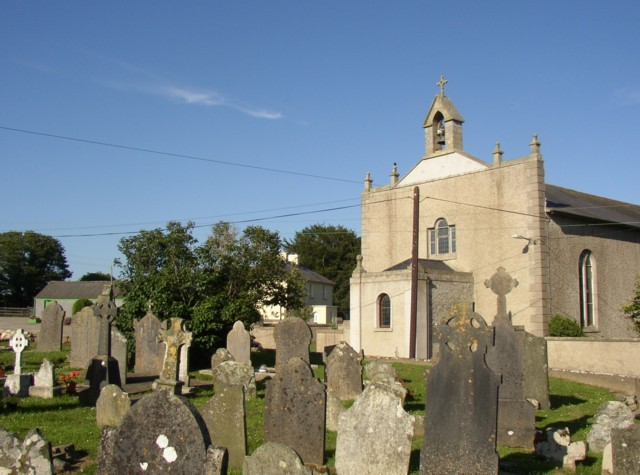
- St Aidan's church

- Location in Ireland
- Coordinates: 52°17′49″N 6°46′11″W
- Country: Ireland
- Province: Leinster
- County: County Wexford

Population (2016)
  - Total: 267

Clongeen (Irish: Cluain Caoin, meaning 'pleasant meadow') is a village and civil parish in County Wexford, Ireland. The village is about 2 kilometres (1.2 mi) south of Foulkesmill. The population was 267 at the 2016 census. The village's Catholic church, St Aidan's (or Edan's), was completed in 1839. Clongeen GAA Club competes in hurling, camogie and men's and women's football.
