= Castletown Liam Mellows GAA =

Irish Gaelic football and ladies' Gaelic football club

Castletown Liam Mellows
- Baile an Chaisleáin Liam Ó Maoilíosa
- Founded: 1886
- County: Wexford
- Colours: Maroon and White
- Grounds: Páirc Perry
- Coordinates: 52°42′37″N 6°12′15″W

Playing kits
Standard colours

Senior Club Championships
	All Ireland	Leinster champions	Wexford champions
Football:	-	-	14

Castletown Liam Mellows Gaelic Athletic Association is a Gaelic football and ladies' Gaelic football club based in Castletown, County Wexford, Ireland.

== History ==
Castletown Liam Mellows are named for the Irish revolutionary Liam Mellows (1892–1922), who is buried in Castletown; his mother was from nearby Inch. They were founded in 1886. They won nine county titles between 1965 and 1981, but then suffered a drought until 2010. They won again in 2019 and 2022, putting them top of the all-time list.

Liam Mellows play at Páirc Perry in Tomnahely, 1.6 km (1 mi) southwest of Castletown. They also won in 2025 and 2024

== Honours ==
=== Gaelic football ===
- Wexford Senior Football Championship (14): 1965, 1966, 1969, 1970, 1973, 1976, 1978, 1979, 1981, 2010, 2019, 2022, 2024, 2025
- Wexford Junior Football Championship (1): 1960

=== Hurling ===
- Wexford Intermediate Hurling Championship (1): 1967
- Wexford Junior Hurling Championship (1): 1964

== Notable players ==
- Ben Brosnan
- Anthony Masterson
