= St Martin's GAA (Wexford) =

Gaelic games club in County Wexford, Ireland

St Martin's
- Cumann Máirtín Naofa
- Founded: 1932
- County: Wexford
- Colours: Maroon and white
- Grounds: St Martin's GAA Grounds
- Coordinates: 52°17′23″N 6°29′31″W

Playing kits
Standard colours

Senior Club Championships
	All Ireland	Leinster champions	Wexford champions
Football:	0	0	1
Hurling:	0	1	5
Camogie:	0	1	5

St Martin's GAA is a Gaelic Athletic Association club in Piercestown, County Wexford, Ireland. The club is affiliated to the Wexford County Board and it fields teams in Gaelic football, hurling, camogie and ladies' Gaelic football.

== History ==
Located in the village of Piercestown, about 6 km (3.7 mi) south of Wexford town, St Martin's GAA Club was founded at a meeting in the local national school in 1932. The club spent the vast majority of its early existence operating in the junior grade. Wexford JFC titles were won in 1938 and 1957, while Wexford JHC titles were won in 1948 and 1963. The latter title was quickly followed with a Wexford IHC title in 1964 and senior status for the first time ever.

St Martin's won a second Wexford IHC title in 1977, before winning the first of five Wexford IFC titles in 1982. The last of these titles was won in 2025. In the intervening period, the club has regularly competed in the top tier in both codes.

The St Martin's club made history in 1999, when the senior hurling team won the Wexford SHC for the first time following a defeat of reigning champions Rathnure. A second Wexford SHC title followed in 2008, before the club won its sole Wexford SFC title in 2013. Between 2017 and 2019, the St Martin's senior camogie team won a hat-trick of Wexford SCC titles, as well as a Leinster Club SCC title. Two Wexford SHC titles were also won during this time. St Martin's claimed a fifth Wexford SHC title in 2025, following a 2-14 to 0-16 win over Rathnure in the final.

== Grounds ==
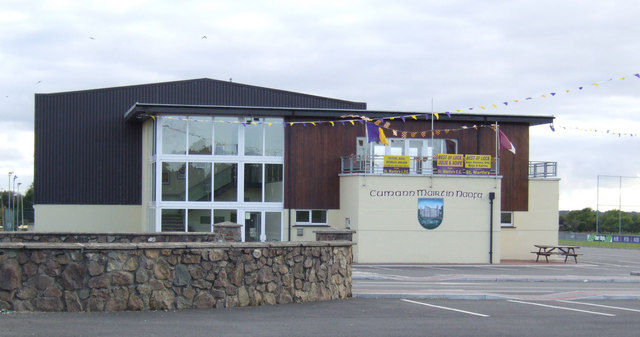
St. Martin's grounds

St Martin's secured its own playing field in 1962 when part of the Johnstown Castle estate was made available to the club. In spite of this, the grounds could not be fully developed as they were not owned by the club. An Act of the Oireachtas was passed in 1980 to allow the sale of the ground to the club. Significant improvements, including a clubhouse, bar facilities and dressing room, have been made since then.

== Honours ==
- Leinster Senior Club Hurling Championship (1): 2025
- Wexford Senior Hurling Championship (5): 1999, 2008, 2017, 2019, 2025
- Wexford Senior Football Championship (1): 2013
- Wexford Intermediate Football Championship (4): 1982, 1994, 2006, 2011, 2025
- Wexford Intermediate Hurling Championship (2): 1964, 1977
- Wexford Junior Hurling Championship (3): 1948, 1963, 2002, 2020
- Wexford Junior Football Championship (3): 1938, 1957, 2017
- Wexford Under-21 Hurling Championship: (3) 2014, 2016, 2017
- Wexford Under-21 Football Championship: (3) 2007, 2009, 2017
- Wexford Under-20 Hurling Championship: (2) 2018, 2019
- Wexford Under-20 Football Championship: (2) 2018, 2019
- Wexford Minor Hurling Championship (4): 2014, 2015, 2016, 2017
- Wexford Minor Football Championship (2): 2015, 2016
- Wexford Senior Camogie Championship (5): 2017, 2018, 2019, 2023, 2026
- Wexford Intermediate Ladies' Football Championship (2): 2017, 2018

== Notable players ==
- Rory McCarthy: All-Ireland SHC-winner (1996)
- John O'Connor: All-Ireland SHC-winner (1996)
- George O'Connor: All-Ireland SHC-winner (1996)
- Séamus Whelan: All-Ireland SHC-winner (1968)
