= 2019 Wexford County Council election =

Part of the 2019 Irish local elections

| ← 2014 | 24 May 2019 | 2024 → |

All 34 seats on Wexford County Council 18 seats needed for a majority
| | First party | Second party | Third party |
|---|---|---|---|
| Party | Fianna Fáil | Fine Gael | Labour |
| Seats won | 12 | 9 | 2 |
| Seat change | ▲1 | Steady | Steady |
| | Fourth party | Fifth party | Sixth party |
| Party | Sinn Féin | Aontú | Independent |
| Seats won | 2 | 1 | 8 |
| Seat change | ▼3 | ▲1 | ▲2 |
- Results by local electoral area
Council control after election
Fianna Fáil/ Independents

An election to all 24 seats on Wexford County Council was held on 24 May 2019 as part of the 2019 Irish local elections. County Wexford was divided into 6 local electoral areas (LEAs) to elect councillors for a five-year term of office on the electoral system of proportional representation by means of the single transferable vote (PR-STV).

== Boundary review ==
Following the recommendations of the 2018 LEA boundary review, the four LEAs used at the 2014 Wexford County Council election were revised, as each exceeded the maximum of 7 seats in the 2018 terms of reference, and replaced by a new set of 6 LEAs.

== Results by party ==
Fianna Fáil gained an additional seat boosting their numbers to 12 overall while also increasing their vote by almost 3%. The party was boosted by the candidature of Malcolm Byrne in the South constituency at the 2019 European Parliament election held on the same day. However outgoing Cathaoirleach Keith Doyle proved to be a casualty in the Enniscorthy LEA. Fine Gael retained 9 seats overall while Labour returned 2 seats again; this time both from the Wexford LEA. Independents increased their numbers by 2 seats from 6 to 8. Sinn Féin lost 3 seats, including 1 to Aontú, to be reduced to just 2 seats in total.

| Party | Seats | ± | 1st pref | FPv% | ±% |
|---|---|---|---|---|---|
| Fianna Fáil | 12 | ▲1 | 18,066 | 30.03 | ▲2.63 |
| Fine Gael | 9 | Steady | 15,095 | 25.09 | ▲0.49 |
| Labour | 2 | Steady | 5,343 | 8.88 | ▲0.48 |
| Sinn Féin | 2 | ▼3 | 4,540 | 7.55 | ▼4.55 |
| Aontú | 1 | ▲1 | 1,017 | 1.69 | New |
| Renua | 0 | Steady | 1,289 | 2.14 | New |
| People Before Profit | 0 | ▼1 | 1,074 | 1.79 | ▼0.01 |
| Inds. 4 Change | 0 | Steady | 757 | 1.26 | New |
| Direct Democracy | 0 | Steady | 53 | 0.09 | ▼0.12 |
| Independent | 8 | ▲2 | 12,929 | 21.49 | ▼0.99 |
| Total | 34 | Steady | 60,163 | 100.0 | |

== Results by local electoral area ==
*: Outgoing councillor elected in 2014.
†: Outgoing councillor coopted subsequent to the 2014 election.

=== Enniscorthy ===
Enniscorthy: 6 seats
| Party | Candidate | FPv% | Count | | | | | |
| Party | Candidate | FPv% | 1 | 2 | 3 | 4 | 5 | 6 |
|---|---|---|---|---|---|---|---|---|
| Fine Gael | Kathleen Codd-Nolan | 13.16% | 1,419 | 1,485 | 1,539 | 1,630 | | |
| Independent | John O'Rourke | 12.01% | 1,295 | 1,366 | 1,462 | 1,573 | | |
| Fianna Fáil | Barbara-Anne Murphy | 11.58% | 1,249 | 1,293 | 1,336 | 1,449 | 1,463 | 1,520 |
| Fine Gael | Cathal Byrne | 11.40% | 1,230 | 1,270 | 1,332 | 1,368 | 1,381 | 1,419 |
| Fianna Fáil | Aidan Browne | 9.22% | 995 | 1,017 | 1,052 | 1,228 | 1,246 | 1,362 |
| Independent | Jackser Owens | 9.09% | 980 | 1,038 | 1,105 | 1,171 | 1,178 | 1,569 |
| Fine Gael | Paddy Kavanagh | 8.97% | 967 | 993 | 1,026 | 1,152 | 1,175 | 1,298 |
| Sinn Féin | Johnny Mythen | 7.58% | 818 | 884 | 928 | 1,016 | 1,021 | |
| Fianna Fáil | Keith Doyle | 7.31% | 788 | 819 | 863 | | | |
| Renua | Gerald O'Donoghue | 4.86% | 524 | 559 | | | | |
| Inds. 4 Change | Annette Byrne Moran | 2.67% | 288 | | | | | |
| Independent | John 'Texas' Byrne | 2.16% | 233 | | | | | |
Electorate: 21,822 Valid: 10,786 Spoilt: 221 Quota: 1,541 Turnout: 11,007 (50.44%)

=== Gorey ===
Gorey: 6 seats
| Party | Candidate | FPv% | Count | | | | | | |
| Party | Candidate | FPv% | 1 | 2 | 3 | 4 | 5 | 6 | 7 |
|---|---|---|---|---|---|---|---|---|---|
| Fianna Fáil | Malcolm Byrne (Note: See change below.) | 25.45% | 2,639 | | | | | | |
| Fine Gael | Anthony Donohoe | 13.54% | 1,404 | 1,511 | | | | | |
| Fianna Fáil | Donal Kenny | 10.67% | 1,106 | 1,305 | 1,314 | 1,337 | 1,428 | 1,441 | 1,452 |
| Fine Gael | Diarmuid Devereux | 9.69% | 1,005 | 1,185 | 1,315 | 1,366 | 1,529 | | |
| Fianna Fáil | Joe Sullivan | 9.15% | 949 | 1,219 | 1,236 | 1,273 | 1,431 | 1,446 | 1,455 |
| Sinn Féin | Fionntán Ó Súilleabháin | 9.11% | 945 | 1,023 | 1,038 | 1,177 | 1,297 | 1,307 | 1,312 |
| Independent | Jimmy Fleming | 8.47% | 878 | 974 | 1,011 | 1,131 | 1,276 | 1,285 | 1,289 |
| Labour | Robert Ireton | 6.57% | 681 | 801 | 845 | 925 | | | |
| People Before Profit | Cinnamon Blackmore | 4.79% | 497 | 550 | 575 | | | | |
| Fine Gael | Elaine Clarke | 2.57% | 266 | 320 | | | | | |
Electorate: 19,989 Valid: 10,370 Spoilt: 208 Quota: 1,482 Turnout: 10,578 (52.92%)

=== Kilmuckridge ===
Kilmuckridge: 4 seats
| Party | Candidate | FPv% | Count | | | | | | |
| Party | Candidate | FPv% | 1 | 2 | 3 | 4 | 5 | 6 | 7 |
|---|---|---|---|---|---|---|---|---|---|
| Fianna Fáil | Pip Breen | 18.12% | 1,297 | 1,298 | 1,322 | 1,474 | | | |
| Fine Gael | Oliver Walsh | 17.98% | 1,287 | 1,289 | 1,307 | 1,360 | 1,375 | 1,383 | 1,544 |
| Independent | Mary Farrell | 17.08% | 1,223 | 1,239 | 1,400 | 1,533 | | | |
| Fianna Fáil | Willie Kavanagh | 15.64% | 1,120 | 1,123 | 1,157 | 1,175 | 1,180 | 1,187 | 1,340 |
| Fine Gael | Edel Gahan | 9.26% | 663 | 665 | 686 | 738 | 772 | 795 | 937 |
| Renua | Peter Mernagh | 8.58% | 614 | 624 | 685 | 736 | 760 | 764 | |
| Labour | Nicky Wafer | 6.64% | 475 | 483 | 528 | | | | |
| Sinn Féin | Colette Nolan | 5.96% | 427 | 436 | | | | | |
| Direct Democracy | Jan Van De Ven | 0.74% | 53 | | | | | | |
Electorate: 13,701 Valid: 7,159 Spoilt: 117 Quota: 1,432 Turnout: 7,276 (53.11%)

=== New Ross ===
New Ross: 6 seats
| Party | Candidate | FPv% | Count | | | | | | | |
| Party | Candidate | FPv% | 1 | 2 | 3 | 4 | 5 | 6 | 7 | 8 |
|---|---|---|---|---|---|---|---|---|---|---|
| Independent | Patrick Gerard Barden | 16.92% | 1,980 | | | | | | | |
| Fianna Fáil | Michael Sheehan | 15.58% | 1,824 | | | | | | | |
| Fianna Fáil | John Fleming | 11.90% | 1,393 | 1,457 | 1,468 | 1,473 | 1,492 | 1,541 | 1,582 | 1,650 |
| Fianna Fáil | Michael Whelan | 11.07% | 1,296 | 1,333 | 1,348 | 1,359 | 1,381 | 1,415 | 1,462 | 1,765 |
| Independent | Anthony Connick | 9.44% | 1,105 | 1,143 | 1,170 | 1,219 | 1,267 | 1,403 | 1,550 | 1,644 |
| Fine Gael | Brídín Murphy | 7.92% | 927 | 980 | 986 | 997 | 1,005 | 1,105 | 1,177 | 1,542 |
| Fine Gael | Willie Fitzharris | 7.26% | 850 | 898 | 905 | 916 | 924 | 968 | 1,007 | |
| Independent | John Dwyer | 6.72% | 787 | 805 | 819 | 876 | 900 | 949 | 1,140 | 1,164 |
| Sinn Féin | Marie Doyle | 4.98% | 583 | 604 | 610 | 697 | 709 | 769 | | |
| Labour | Bridín Moloney | 4.19% | 490 | 505 | 508 | 563 | 573 | | | |
| People Before Profit | Susan Jennifer Breen | 2.73% | 319 | 329 | 340 | | | | | |
| Renua | Dorota Kulesza | 1.29% | 151 | 154 | | | | | | |
Electorate: 22,001 Valid: 11,705 Spoilt: 251 Quota: 1,673 Turnout: 11,956 (54.34%)

=== Rosslare ===
Rosslare: 5 seats
| Party | Candidate | FPv% | Count | | | | | | | |
| Party | Candidate | FPv% | 1 | 2 | 3 | 4 | 5 | 6 | 7 | 8 |
|---|---|---|---|---|---|---|---|---|---|---|
| Independent | Ger Carthy | 24.74% | 2,317 | | | | | | | |
| Fine Gael | Frank Staples | 16.57% | 1,552 | 1,720 | | | | | | |
| Fianna Fáil | Michael Wallace | 9.81% | 919 | 942 | 946 | 952 | 1,041 | 1,090 | | |
| Fianna Fáil | Lisa McDonald | 9.71% | 910 | 1,057 | 1,076 | 1,112 | 1,169 | 1,252 | 1,620 | |
| Fine Gael | Jim Moore | 9.45% | 885 | 1,027 | 1,065 | 1,120 | 1,266 | 1,361 | 1,539 | 1,562 |
| Sinn Féin | Mick Roche | 8.96% | 839 | 912 | 964 | 983 | 1,015 | 1,150 | 1,250 | 1,258 |
| Aontú | Jim Codd | 8.30% | 777 | 858 | 892 | 907 | 1,024 | 1,114 | 1,295 | 1,322 |
| Fine Gael | Paul Codd | 5.27% | 494 | 527 | 529 | 535 | | | | |
| Inds. 4 Change | Jane Johnstone | 5.01% | 469 | 533 | 578 | 581 | 611 | | | |
| Independent | Terry Lawton | 2.19% | 205 | 229 | | | | | | |
Electorate: 17,103 Valid: 9,367 Spoilt: 153 Quota: 1,562 Turnout: 9,520 (55.66%)

=== Wexford ===
Wexford: 7 seats
| Party | Candidate | FPv% | Count | | | | | | | | |
| Party | Candidate | FPv% | 1 | 2 | 3 | 4 | 5 | 6 | 7 | 8 | 9 |
|---|---|---|---|---|---|---|---|---|---|---|---|
| Labour | George Lawlor | 21.92% | 2,362 | | | | | | | | |
| Fine Gael | John Hegarty | 12.53% | 1,350 | | | | | | | | |
| Independent | Leonard Kelly | 10.34% | 1,114 | 1,239 | 1,259 | 1,297 | 1,362 | | | | |
| Fianna Fáil | Garry Laffan | 8.62% | 929 | 973 | 978 | 995 | 998 | 1,038 | 1,106 | 1,106 | 1,354 |
| Sinn Féin | Tom Forde | 8.61% | 928 | 1,002 | 1,005 | 1,028 | 1,072 | 1,085 | 1,103 | 1,107 | 1,159 |
| Labour | Maura Bell | 7.63% | 822 | 1,071 | 1,075 | 1,092 | 1,107 | 1,180 | 1,337 | 1,339 | 1,493 |
| Independent | Davy Hynes | 7.02% | 756 | 866 | 874 | 921 | 977 | 1,008 | 1,069 | 1,077 | 1,225 |
| Fianna Fáil | Colin Murphy | 6.05% | 652 | 727 | 729 | 750 | 757 | 776 | 832 | 832 | |
| Labour | Joe Ryan | 4.76% | 513 | 734 | 736 | 740 | 762 | 805 | 895 | 895 | 989 |
| Fine Gael | Ger Walsh | 3.88% | 418 | 456 | 457 | 458 | 469 | 647 | | | |
| Fine Gael | Angela Reville | 3.51% | 378 | 434 | 435 | 442 | 447 | | | | |
| People Before Profit | Tony Walsh | 2.39% | 258 | 268 | 273 | 282 | | | | | |
| Aontú | Elaine Cole | 2.23% | 240 | 246 | 252 | | | | | | |
| Independent | Mícheál Ó Drisceol | 0.52% | 56 | 62 | | | | | | | |
Electorate: 22,044 Valid: 10,776 Spoilt: 169 Quota: 1,348 Turnout: 10,945 (49.65%)

== Results by gender ==
2019 Wexford County Council election Candidates by gender
| Gender | Number of candidates | % of candidates | Elected councillors | % of councillors |
|---|---|---|---|---|
| Men | 34 | 69.4% | 16 | 80.0% |
| Women | 15 | 30.6% | 4 | 20.0% |
| TOTAL | 49 | | 20 | |

== Changes after the 2019 election ==
=== Co-options ===
| Party | Outgoing | LEA | Reason | Date | Co-optee |
|---|---|---|---|---|---|
| Fianna Fáil | Malcolm Byrne | Gorey | Elected to the 32nd Dáil at the 2019 Wexford by-election in November 2019 | 20 January 2020 | Andrew Bolger |

=== Changes in affiliation ===
| Name | LEA | Elected as | New affiliation | Date |
|---|---|---|---|---|
| Davy Hynes | Wexford | Independent | Sinn Féin | December 2022 |
