= 2009 Wexford County Council election =

Part of the 2009 Irish local elections

← 2004	5 June 2009	2014 →

All 21 seats on Wexford County Council
	First party	Second party	Third party
Party	Fine Gael	Fianna Fáil	Labour
Seats won	10	5	4
Seat change	+3	-1	+3
	Fourth party	Fifth party
Party	Independent	Sinn Féin
Seats won	2	0
Seat change	-2	-3
- Map showing the area of Wexford County Council
Council control after election
TBD

An election to Wexford County Council took place on 5 June 2009 as part of that year's Irish local elections. 21 councillors were elected from four local electoral areas (LEAs) for a five-year term of office on the electoral system of proportional representation by means of the single transferable vote (PR-STV).

== Results by party ==
Party	Seats	±	First Pref. votes	FPv%	±%
Fine Gael	10	+3			
Fianna Fáil	5	-1			
Labour	4	+3			
Independent	2	-2			
Sinn Féin	0	-3			
Totals	21	-		100.0	—

== Results by local electoral area ==
=== Enniscorthy ===
Enniscorthy - 5 seats
Party	Candidate	FPv%	Count				
Party	Candidate	FPv%	1	2	3	4	5
Fine Gael	Kathleen Codd-Nolan*	13.99	1,974	2,013	2,043	2,188	2,287
Fine Gael	Patrick Kavanagh	13.65	1,926	1,996	1,998	2,199	2,449
Fine Gael	Oliver Walsh*	12.67	1,788	1,839	2,061	2,105	2,207
Labour	Pat Cody	11.88	1,676	1,809	1,837	2,031	2,372
Fianna Fáil	Barbara Ann Murphy*	10.76	1,518	1,544	1,787	1,856	1,909
Fianna Fáil	Keith Doyle	10.53	1,485	1,532	1,728	1,868	2,217
Independent	Seán Doyle*	7.84	1,106	1,220	1,235		
Independent	Jackser Owens	7.63	1,077	1,258	1,281	1,589	
Fianna Fáil	Bernadette Murphy	5.84	824	844			
Sinn Féin	Noreen Sheridan	5.20	734				
Electorate: 25,498 Valid: 14,108 (55.33%) Spoilt: 236 Quota: 2,352 Turnout: 14,344 (56.26%)

=== Gorey ===
Gorey - 5 seats
Party	Candidate	FPv%	Count					
Party	Candidate	FPv%	1	2	3	4	5	6
Fine Gael	John Hegarty	17.20	2,386					
Fianna Fáil	Malcolm Byrne	13.89	1,927	2,091	2,099	2,570		
Independent	Declan McPartlin*	11.88	1,648	1,798	1,803	1,862	1,879	2,106
Labour	Bobby Ireton	11.54	1,601	1,827	1,835	2,056	2,107	2,331
Fine Gael	Michael Kinsella*	11.33	1,572	1,670	1,699	1,788	1,811	2,515
Fianna Fáil	Lorcan Allen*	8.98	1,246	1,296	1,298	1,528	1,674	1,732
Fine Gael	Ellen Lynch	8.91	1,236	1,302	1,320	1,406	1,427	
Fianna Fáil	Jimmy Fleming*	8.53	1,183	1,286	1,290			
Sinn Féin	Michael Carty	6.49	900					
Independent	Ger Walsh	1.23	171					
Electorate: 25,031 Valid: 13,870 (55.41%) Spoilt: 218 Quota: 2,312 Turnout: 14,088 (56.28%)

=== New Ross ===
New Ross - 4 seats
Party	Candidate	FPv%	Count				
Party	Candidate	FPv%	1	2	3	4	5
Fine Gael	Denis Kennedy*	15.65	1,911	1,974	2,069	2,251	2,473
Fianna Fáil	Michael Sheehan	14.18	1,732	1,750	1,861	2,015	2,288
Fine Gael	Larry O'Brien*	14.07	1,718	1,794	1,907	2,181	2,342
Fianna Fáil	Martin Murphy*	13.12	1,602	1,691	1,729	1,799	2,455
Sinn Féin	John Dwyer*	12.89	1,574	1,628	1,698	1,924	2,064
Fianna Fáil	Jimmy Curtis*	11.97	1,462	1,564	1,602	1,674	
Labour	Ollie Somers	7.82	955	1,026	1,192		
Green	Seán Reidy	5.55	678	720			
Independent	Jack Fardy	4.75	580				
Electorate: 22,164 Valid: 12,212 (55.10%) Spoilt: 252 Quota: 2,443 Turnout: 12,464 (56.24%)

=== Wexford ===
Wexford - 7 seats
Party	Candidate	FPv%	Count												
Party	Candidate	FPv%	1	2	3	4	5	6	7	8	9	10	11	12	13
Labour	George Lawlor	11.66	2,210	2,225	2,240	2,276	2,314	2,377							
Labour	Ted Howlin*	10.20	1,934	1,947	1,957	1,976	1,999	2,035	2,187	2,267	2,306	2,486			
Fianna Fáil	Tony Dempsey	8.43	1,599	1,603	1,610	1,622	1,627	1,632	1,650	1,918	1,949	2,013	2,060	2,077	2,089
Fine Gael	Jim Moore	8.31	1,576	1,580	1,583	1,601	1,612	1,625	1,659	1,732	1,858	1,922	1,984	2,000	2,014
Fine Gael	Pat Codd*	8.25	1,565	1,572	1,585	1,595	1,603	1,630	1,650	1,918	1,949	2,013	2,060	2,077	2,089
Fine Gael	Anna Fenlon*	7.71	1,461	1,471	1,501	1,517	1,552	1,608	1,694	1,878	1,898	2,056	2,230	2,252	2,278
Independent	Padge Reck*	7.55	1,431	1,448	1,460	1,490	1,541	1,608	1,660	1,698	1,739	1,971	2,262	2,314	2,335
Independent	Leo Carthy*	6.99	1,326	1,332	1,354	1,372	1,389	1,415	1,436	1,515	1,630	1,762	1,877	1,945	1,961
Sinn Féin	Maurice Roche*	6.67	1,265	1,276	1,289	1,298	1,321	1,360	1,409	1,421	1,439				
Fianna Fáil	Fergie Kehoe*	5.79	1,097	1,101	1,111	1,120	1,139	1,169	1,216	1,249	1,492	1,603			
Fianna Fáil	Noel Howlin	4.83	916	916	916	920	922	925	941	947					
Fine Gael	Jim Allen	4.21	799	800	805	807	818	825	857						
Green	Danny Forde	2.90	550	560	571	581	597	615							
Independent	Do Do Lawlor	2.07	392	412	425	447	455								
Independent	Alan McGuire	1.40	266	269	278	293									
Independent	Vincent Kennedy	1.29	245	245	253										
Independent	James Breen	1.01	191	193											
Independent	Willie Kinsella	0.72	137												
Electorate: 36,473 Valid: 18,960 (51.98%) Spoilt: 303 Quota: 2,371 Turnout: 19,263 (52.81%)
