= 2014 Wexford County Council election =

Part of the 2014 Irish local elections

← 2009	23 May 2014	2019 →

All 34 seats on Wexford County Council 18 seats needed for a majority
	First party	Second party	Third party
Party	Fianna Fáil	Fine Gael	Sinn Féin
Seats won	11	9	5
Seat change	+6	-1	+5
	Fourth party	Fifth party	Sixth party
Party	Labour	People Before Profit	Independent
Seats won	2	1	6
Seat change	-2	+1	+4
- Area of Wexford County Council

An election to all 34 seats on Wexford County Council took place on 23 May 2014 as part of the 2014 Irish local elections, an increase from 21 seats at the 2009 election. The town councils of Enniscorthy, Gorey and New Ross and the borough council of Wexford were all abolished. County Wexford was divided into three local electoral areas (LEAs) to elect councillors for a five-year term of office on the electoral system of proportional representation by means of the single transferable vote (PR-STV).

Fianna Fáil and Sinn Féin were the big winners in this election. Fianna Fáil also supplanted Fine Gael as the largest party but the additional seats helped to reduce the impact on the party as they only lost 1 seat. Labour lost half of their seats as Independents trebled their membership on the Council and People Before Profit won a seat.

== Results by party ==
Party	Seats	±	1st pref	FPv%	±%
Fianna Fáil	11	+6	15,033	27.4	
Fine Gael	9	-1	13,478	24.6	
Sinn Féin	5	+5	6,638	12.1	
Labour	2	-2	4,613	8.4	
People Before Profit	1	+1	981	1.8	
Éirígí	0	0	1,231	4.4	
Direct Democracy	0	0	114	0.21	
Independent	6	+4	12,453	20.5	
Total	34	+13	54,875	100.0	—

== Results by local electoral area ==
*: Outgoing councillor.

=== Enniscorthy ===
Enniscorthy: 8 seats
Party	Candidate	FPv%	Count							
Party	Candidate	FPv%	1	2	3	4	5	6	7	8
Fianna Fáil	James Browne	14.78	1,969							
Sinn Féin	Johnny Mythen	13.60	1,812							
Fianna Fáil	Barbara-Anne Murphy	10.60	1,412	1,457	1,466	1,492				
Fine Gael	Paddy Kavanagh	9.88	1,316	1,359	1,383	1,414	1,528			
Fine Gael	Kathleen Codd-Nolan	9.75	1,298	1,335	1,344	1,360	1,400	1,407	1,548	
Fine Gael	Oliver Walsh	8.33	1,110	1,129	1,138	1,158	1,232	1,243	1,527	
Independent	John O'Rourke	6.37	848	880	957	1,186	1,224	1,226	1,344	1,358
Labour	Martin Storey	6.24	831	853	878	921	1,031	1,047		
Independent	Jackser Owens	6.03	803	832	922	1,022	1,066	1,068	1,181	1,196
Fianna Fáil	Willie Kavanagh	5.48	730	768	776	783	783			
Fianna Fáil	Keith Doyle	4.96	660	872	894	931	1,167	1,177	1,302	1,330
Independent	Annette Moran	3.98	530	542	601					
Electorate: 27,392 Valid: 13,319 Spoilt: 179 Quota: 1,480 Turnout: 13,498 (49%)

=== Gorey ===
Gorey: 8 seats
Party	Candidate	FPv%	Count											
Party	Candidate	FPv%	1	2	3	4	5	6	7	8	9	10	11	12
Fianna Fáil	Malcolm Byrne	13.06	1,688											
Sinn Féin	Fionntán Ó Súilleabháin	10.26	1,326	1,337	1,348	1,400	1,419	1,447						
Fianna Fáil	Joe Sullivan	7.84	1,013	1,059	1,066	1,079	1,102	1,124	1,166	1,196	1,297	1,322	1,617	
Labour	Bobby Ireton	7.24	935	969	975	1,005	1,032	1,060	1,110	1,146	1,201	1,255	1,334	1,354
Fine Gael	John Hegarty	7.07	914	939	940	943	956	968	1,027	1,041	1,064	1,170	1,217	1,227
Fianna Fáil	Pip Breen	6.92	894	920	924	929	936	944	953	969	986	1,037	1,218	1,325
Independent	Mary Farrell	6.88	889	898	917	949	984	1,068	1,086	1,183	1,401	1,452		
Fine Gael	Anthony Donohoe	6.86	886	896	902	908	918	925	966	985	1,007	1,120	1,242	1,277
Fine Gael	Aine Lacy-O'Meara	6.29	813	819	822	825	839	841	859	866	881	1,032	1,035	1,044
Fianna Fáil	Jack Redmond	5.50	711	727	727	729	738	748	760	791	818	960		
Fine Gael	Michael Kinsella	5.38	695	701	707	710	720	725	752	771	793			
Éirígí	Dominick Gaughan	3.52	455	459	465	491	511	531	551					
Independent	Alan Molloy	2.79	361	370	380	424	483	549	614	715				
Fine Gael	Darren Keegan	2.63	340	360	369	375	388	418						
Independent	Owen Dunbar	2.39	309	323	338	351	374							
Independent	Gavin Nugent	2.23	288	295	305	324								
Independent	Cormac McManus	2.16	279	282	292									
Independent	Ivan Kelly	0.98	127	133										
Electorate: 25,458 Valid: 12,923 (50.76%) Spoilt: 203 Quota: 1,436 Turnout: 13,126 (52%)

=== New Ross ===
New Ross: 8 seats
Party	Candidate	FPv%	Count											
Party	Candidate	FPv%	1	2	3	4	5	6	7	8	9	10	11	12
Independent	Martin Murphy	10.83	1,373	1,386	1,406	1,430								
Fianna Fáil	Michael Sheehan	7.84	994	1,016	1,041	1,053	1,054	1,099	1,116	1,208	1,236	1,296	1,376	1,388
Fianna Fáil	Michael Whelan	7.44	944	950	959	968	968	978	1,003	1,023	1,040	1,349	1,364	1,369
Sinn Féin	Oisin O'Connell	7.14	906	909	927	993	995	1,024	1,073	1,096	1,111	1,169	1,190	1,194
Fine Gael	Larry O'Brien	7.03	891	904	943	952	953	980	1,009	1,059	1,274	1,306	1,519	
Fianna Fáil	John Fleming	6.55	831	838	843	850	850	859	916	949	1,119	1,182	1,221	1,225
Fine Gael	Willie Fitzharris	6.38	809	818	857	858	860	869	892	916	995	1,159	1,406	1,471
Fianna Fáil	Brian Wallace	6.20	786	789	812	821	821	823	870	876	888	888		
Éirígí	John Dwyer	6.12	776	786	794	855	855	920	960	1,035	1,053	1,073	1,101	1,102
Independent	Anthony Connick	5.70	723	769	804	838	842	937	994	1,143	1,174	1,213	1,353	1,371
Fine Gael	Denis Kennedy	5.36	680	691	717	725	725	734	765	795	795			
Fine Gael	Niamh Fitzgibbon	4.71	597	632	655	670	670	721	740	796	932	945	945	
Independent	Victor Furness	3.77	478	514	524	541	545	640	684					
Independent	Paddy Whitty	3.65	463	470	486	515	518	536						
Independent	Bobby Dunphy	3.03	384	431	457	510	513							
People Before Profit	Seamus O'Brien	3.01	382	384	395									
Labour	Ollie Somers	2.89	366	376										
Independent	Paul Crowdle	2.37	300											
Electorate: 25,137 Valid: 12,683 (50.46%) Spoilt: 238 Quota: 1,401 Turnout: 12,921 (51.40%)

=== Wexford ===
Wexford: 10 seats
Party	Candidate	FPv%	Count															
Party	Candidate	FPv%	1	2	3	4	5	6	7	8	9	10	11	12	13	14	15	16
Independent	Ger Carthy	12.11	1,932															
Sinn Féin	Anthony Kelly	11.48	1,831															
Labour	George Lawlor	9.92	1,582															
Fianna Fáil	Tony Dempsey	9.05	1,444	1,507														
Fine Gael	Frank Staples	6.02	960	1,001	1,003	1,007	1,009	1,010	1,017	1,019	1,083	1,089	1,141	1,200	1,234	1,350	1,402	1,451
Fianna Fáil	Fergie Kehoe	6.0	957	995	1,016	1,033	1,048	1,094	1,137	1,193	1,220	1,270	1,322	1,352	1,390	1,479		
Fine Gael	Jim Moore	5.79	923	982	984	992	1,001	1,004	1,017	1,026	1,096	1,104	1,162	1,240	1,293	1,514		
Sinn Féin	Mick Roche	4.83	763	806	1,019	1,022	1,026	1,057	1,078	1,115	1,122	1,143	1,169	1,211	1,270	1,282	1,283	1,344
Independent	David Hynes	3.89	614	642	669	679	681	691	726	783	801	885	932	954	1,028	1,080	1,081	1,258
People Before Profit	Deirdre Wadding	3.76	599	617	636	640	641	698	765	798	813	860	880	929	1,025	1,043	1,043	1,195
Independent	Leonard Kelly	3.13	499	517	528	532	533	547	578	599	617	662	691	704	781	811	811	
Fine Gael	Jim Allen	3.0	479	492	495	505	506	509	522	529	586	598	686	710	730			
Independent	Jane Johnstone	2.97	474	501	507	509	510	514	533	552	556	580	602	616				
Labour	Bernie Mullen	2.82	450	484	487	502	508	502	525	537	550	566	583					
Labour	Joe Ryan	2.82	449	457	461	491	491	500	519	533	564	593	628	756	792	853	862	970
Fine Gael	Mark Fenlon	2.42	386	404	415	423	428	430	441	461	509	550						
Fine Gael	Sandra Lacey	2.39	381	389	393	398	398	404	413	418								
Independent	Do Do Lawlor	2.22	354	361	379	381	382	391	396									
Green	Danny Forde	2.16	344	358	365	369	373	379										
Independent	Donal Fallon	1.96	313	350	363	368	371	384	399	437	446							
Direct Democracy	David Lloyd	0.71	114	116	120	121	121											
Independent	Paul O'Hanlon	0.70	112	117	119	119	119											
Electorate: 33,028 Valid: 15,950 (48.29%) Spoilt: 237 Quota: 1,451 Turnout: 16,187 (49.01%)

== Changes ==
=== Co-options ===
Party	Outgoing	LEA	Reason	Date	Co-optee
Fianna Fáil	James Browne	Enniscorthy	Elected to the 32nd Dáil at the 2016 general election.	15 March 2016	Willie Kavanagh
Fianna Fáil	Fergie Kehoe	Wexford	Death.	11 July 2016	Lisa McDonald
People Before Profit	Deirdre Wadding	Wexford	Resigned her seat citing mental health caused stress.	November 2017	Tony Walsh
Sinn Féin	Anthony Kelly	Wexford	Resigned due to ill-health.	2 January 2018	Thomas Forde
Sinn Féin	Oisin O'Connell	New Ross	Resigned citing family and work pressures.	January 2019	Marie Doyle
Independent	Martin Murphy	New Ross	Resignation.	9 March 2019	Vacant.

== Sources ==
"Wexford County Council". Irish Independent. Archived from the original on 28 May 2014.
