= 1999 Wexford County Council election =

Part of the 1999 Irish local elections

← 1991	10 June 1999	2004 →

All 21 seats to Wexford County Council
	First party	Second party	Third party
Party	Fianna Fáil	Fine Gael	Labour
Seats won	9	8	1
Seat change	+1	-	-
	Fourth party
Party	Independent
Seats won	3
Seat change	-1
- Map showing the area of Wexford County Council
Council control after election
TBD

An election to Wexford County Council took place on 10 June 1999 as part of that year's Irish local elections. 21 councillors were elected from four local electoral areas for a five-year term of office on the system of proportional representation by means of the single transferable vote (PR-STV).

== Results by party ==
Party	Seats	±	First Pref. votes	FPv%	±%
Fianna Fáil	9	+1	15,851	36.77	
Fine Gael	8	-	14,410	33.43	
Labour	1	-	5,568	12.92	
Independent	3	-1	4,651	10.79	
Totals	21	-	43,107	100.00	—

== Results by local electoral area ==
=== Enniscorthy ===
Enniscorthy - 5 seats
Party	Candidate	FPv%	Count							
Party	Candidate	FPv%	1	2	3	4	5	6	7	8
Fine Gael	Ivan Yates TD	19.69	2,235							
Fianna Fáil	John Browne TD*	17.95	2,038							
Fianna Fáil	Michelle Sinnott*	12.62	1,433	1,456	1,501	1,552	1,596	1,842	1,975	
Fine Gael	Jack Bolger*	10.60	1,203	1,296	1,306	1,333	1,435	1,644	2,231	
Independent	Seán Doyle*	9.17	1,041	1,093	1,121	1,291	1,388	1,421	1,550	1,671
Fianna Fáil	Rory Murphy*	8.17	927	943	979	1,012	1,141	1,159	1,209	1,290
Fine Gael	Oliver Walsh	6.54	742	786	789	804	853			
Fine Gael	Patrick Kavanagh*	6.47	735	815	824	851	893	1,124		
Labour	Winnie O'Leary	4.87	553	572	577	613				
Sinn Féin	Ray Keogh	3.93	446	461	470					
Electorate: 21,036 Valid: 11,353 (53.97%) Spoilt: 228 Quota: 1,893 Turnout: 11,581 (55.05%)

=== Gorey ===
Gorey - 4 seats
Party	Candidate	FPv%	Count					
Party	Candidate	FPv%	1	2	3	4	5	6
Fine Gael	Michael D'Arcy TD*	28.19	2,343					
Fianna Fáil	Lorcan Allen*	15.87	1,319	1,414	1,433	1,515	1,592	1,652
Fianna Fáil	Joe Murphy	14.56	1,210	1,246	1,263	1,311	1,377	1,549
Fine Gael	Deirdre Bolger*	11.23	933	1,246	1,295	1,326	1,452	1,980
Fine Gael	Matt O'Loughlin	8.83	734	832	852	874	966	
Labour	Bobby Ireton	7.28	605	673	716	794	1,017	1,110
Labour	Helen Brady	7.27	604	625	657	705		
Sinn Féin	Geraldine Redmond	4.24	352	378	400			
Green	Maureen Foister	2.54	211	234				
Electorate: 16,069 Valid: 8,311 (51.72%) Spoilt: 262 Quota: 1,663 Turnout: 8,484 (52.80%)

=== New Ross ===
New Ross - 5 seats
Party	Candidate	FPv%	Count						
Party	Candidate	FPv%	1	2	3	4	5	6	7
Fianna Fáil	Senator Jim Walsh*	20.60	1,956						
Fianna Fáil	Jimmy Curtis*	16.23	1,541	1,601					
Fine Gael	Larry O'Brien*	14.71	1,397	1,451	1,480	1,580	1,583		
Fianna Fáil	Seamus Whelan*	12.81	1,217	1,307	1,355	1,431	1,442	1,877	
Fine Gael	Denis Kennedy	9.40	893	908	929	1,050	1,051	1,288	1,355
Fianna Fáil	Michael Joyce	8.70	826	862	884	1,008	1,012		
Labour	Bobby Dunphy	7.68	729	814	931	1,016	1,017	1,072	1,119
Independent	John Moore	6.40	608	625	664				
Sinn Féin	John Dwyer	3.47	330	346					
Electorate: 19,918 Valid: 9,497 (47.68%) Spoilt: 228 Quota: 1,583 Turnout: 9,725 (48.83%)

=== Wexford ===
Wexford - 7 seats
Party	Candidate	FPv%	Count										
Party	Candidate	FPv%	1	2	3	4	5	6	7	8	9	10	11
Labour	Brendan Howlin TD	18.56	2,588										
Independent	Leo Carthy*	12.29	1,714	1,784									
Fine Gael	Pat Codd*	10.17	1,419	1,440	1,455	1,460	1,465	1,524	1,530	1,569	1,587	1,832	
Independent	Padge Reck*	9.24	1,288	1,448	1,524	1,645	1,657	1,817					
Fianna Fáil	Gus Byrne*	8.78	1,225	1,300	1,327	1,497	1,502	1,598	1,615	1,906			
Fine Gael	Anna Fenlon	7.73	1,078	1,165	1,250	1,351	1,352	1,485	1,509	1,563	1,578	1,949	
Sinn Féin	Maurice Roche	6.04	842	863	928	969	970	1,012	1,018	1,111	1,135	1,188	1,222
Fianna Fáil	Josephine Doyle	5.73	799	815	826	862	864	885	887	1,093	1,184	1,250	1,338
Fianna Fáil	Mary Doyle	5.23	730	755	771	851	852	878	880				
Fine Gael	Philomena Roche	5.01	698	769	811	830	833	899	915	958	972		
Fianna Fáil	Paddy Nolan	4.52	630	671	687								
Labour	Tommy Carr*	3.51	489	714	768	799	809						
Green	Danny Forde	3.20	446	478									
Electorate: 29,993 Valid: 13,946 (46.50%) Spoilt: 241 Quota: 1,744 Turnout: 14,187 (47.30%)
