= 1991 Wexford County Council election =

Part of the 1991 Irish local elections

← 1985	27 June 1991	1999 →

All 21 seats to Wexford County Council
	First party	Second party	Third party
Party	Fianna Fáil	Fine Gael	Labour
Seats won	8	8	1
Seat change	-3	+2	0
	Fourth party
Party	Independent
Seats won	4
Seat change	+1
- Map showing the area of Wexford County Council
Council control after election
TBD

An election to Wexford County Council took place on 27 June 1991 as part of that year's Irish local elections. 21 councillors were elected from four local electoral areas (LEAs) for a five-year term of office on the electoral system of proportional representation by means of the single transferable vote (PR-STV). This term was extended twice, first to 1998, then to 1999.

== Results by party ==
Party	Seats	±	First Pref. votes	FPv%	±%
Fianna Fáil	8	-3	17,080	40.25	
Fine Gael	8	+2	12,806	30.18	
Labour	1	0	5,331	12.56	
Independent	4	+1	5,243	12.36	
Totals	21	-	42,436	100.00	—

== Results by local electoral area ==
=== Enniscorthy ===
Enniscorthy - 5 seats
Party	Candidate	FPv%	Count						
Party	Candidate	FPv%	1	2	3	4	5	6	7
Fianna Fáil	John Browne TD*	21.6%	2,167						
Fine Gael	Ivan Yates TD*	17.3%	1,740						
Fianna Fáil	Michael Sinnott*	14.6%	1,470	1,602	1,606	1,704			
Independent	Seán Doyle*	10.7%	1,075	1,201	1,213	1,298	1,302	1,517	1,559
Fine Gael	Jack Bolger*	10.7%	1,000	1,020	1,044	1,102	1,104	1,166	1,816
Fine Gael	John Walsh	8.6%	861	866	881	934	941	1,010	
Fianna Fáil	Henry Hipwell	8.4%	845	996	998	1,035	1,051	1,080	1,140
Labour	Francis O'Connor	4.5%	454	485	490	537	537		
Independent	Pat Murphy	4.3%	432	459	462				
Electorate: 17,954 Valid: 10,044 (55.94%) Spoilt: 228 Quota: 1,675 Turnout: 10,182 (56.71%)

=== Gorey ===
Gorey - 5 seats
Party	Candidate	FPv%	Count					
Party	Candidate	FPv%	1	2	3	4	5	6
Fine Gael	Michael D'Arcy TD*	24.4%	2,469					
Fianna Fáil	Lorcan Allen*	13.9%	1,406	1,503	1,620	1,733		
Fianna Fáil	Rory Murphy*	12.8%	1,297	1,319	1,345	1,457	1,461	1,471
Fianna Fáil	Joe Murphy	12.2%	1,230	1,260	1,310	1,416	1,424	1,442
Fine Gael	Jim Gahan	10.8%	1,092	1,276	1,316	1,618	1,668	1,688
Fine Gael	Deirdre Bolger*	10.2%	1,029	1,383	1,504	1,747		
Labour	Paddy Murray	8.6%	870	903	1,279			
Labour	Bobby Ireton	7.1%	714	778				
Electorate: 16,825 Valid: 10,107 (60.07%) Spoilt: 148 Quota: 1,685 Turnout: 10,255 (60.95%)

=== New Ross ===
New Ross - 5 seats
Party	Candidate	FPv%	Count						
Party	Candidate	FPv%	1	2	3	4	5	6	7
Fianna Fáil	Senator Hugh Byrne*	21.8%	2,200	1,307	1,355	1,431	1,442	1,877	
Fianna Fáil	Jim Walsh*	15.1%	1,525	1,602	1,736				
Fianna Fáil	Jimmy Curtis*	11.8%	1,192	1,351	1,361	1,362	1,927		
Fine Gael	Larry O'Brien	11.2%	1,134	1,184	1,228	1,234	1,362	1,415	1,748
Fine Gael	John T. Browne*	10.2%	1,037	1,059	1,090	1,096	1,167	1,217	1,517
Progressive Democrats	Eoin Minihan	8.4%	849	883	988	1,014	1,071	1,102	
Labour	John Doyle	8.2%	827	847	1,059	1,069	1,100	1,113	1,276
Fianna Fáil	Seamus Whelan*	7.9%	798	938	945	947			
Labour	Patrick Doyle	5.4%	546	558					
Electorate: 16,815 Valid: 10,108 (60.11%) Spoilt: 138 Quota: 1,685 Turnout: 10,246 (60.93%)

=== Wexford ===
Wexford - 6 seats
Party	Candidate	FPv%	Count									
Party	Candidate	FPv%	1	2	3	4	5	6	7	8	9	10
Labour	Brendan Howlin TD*	13.1%	1,597	1,624	1,803							
Fine Gael	Senator Avril Doyle*	11.8%	1,431	1,467	1,483	1,488	1,555	1,576	1,619	1,672	1,689	1,816
Independent	Helen Corish	10.7%	1,301	1,344	1,363	1,375	1,444	1,471	1,533	1,583	1,620	1,918
Independent	Leo Carthy*	8.5%	1,032	1,045	1,060	1,068	1,133	1,153	1,160	1,340	1,455	1,527
Fine Gael	Pat Codd	8.3%	1,013	1,019	1,028	1,031	1,070	1,182	1,186	1,223	1,236	1,250
Fianna Fáil	Gus Byrne*	8.1%	992	1,012	1,028	1,031	1,097	1,246	1,534	2,141		
Independent	Padge Reck*	7.6%	931	975	1,004	1,015	1,091	1,103	1,187	1,212	1,222	1,525
Workers' Party	Michael Enright	7.3%	893	907	932	951	959	969	1,048	1,056	1,060	
Fianna Fáil	Josephine Doyle	6.7%	811	813	818	818	846	979	1,047			
Fianna Fáil	Paddy Nolan	5%	610	615	619	621	632	686				
Fianna Fáil	Bridget Molloy	4.4%	537	540	542	542	567					
Independent	Pat Murphy	3.9%	472	476	481	481						
Labour	Vincent Byrne	2.7%	323	331								
Progressive Democrats	John Roche	1.9%	234									
Electorate: 22,875 Valid: 12,177 (53.23%) Spoilt: 115 Quota: 1,740 Turnout: 12,292 (53.74%)
