= 2004 Wexford County Council election =

Part of the 2004 Irish local elections

- 11 June 2004

All 21 seats on Wexford County Council
	First party	Second party	Third party
Party	Fine Gael	Fianna Fáil	Sinn Féin
Seats won	7	6	3
Seat change	-1	-3	+3
	Fourth party	Fifth party
Party	Labour	Independent
Seats won	1	4
Seat change	-	+1
- Map showing the area of Wexford County Council
Council control after election
TBD

An election to Wexford County Council took place on 11 June 2004 as part of that year's Irish local elections. 21 councillors were elected from four local electoral areas (LEAs) for a five-year term of office on the electoral system of proportional representation by means of the single transferable vote (PR-STV).

== Results by party ==
Party	Seats	±	First Pref. votes	FPv%	±%
Fine Gael	7	-1	18,646	32.74	
Fianna Fáil	6	-3	17,419	30.59	
Sinn Féin	3	+3	5,103	8.96	
Labour	1	-	5,012	8.80	
Independent	4	+1	8,830	15.50	
Totals	21	-	56,952	100.00	—

== Results by local electoral area ==
=== Enniscorthy ===
Enniscorthy - 5 seats
Party	Candidate	FPv%	Count											
Party	Candidate	FPv%	1	2	3	4	5	6	7	8	9	10	11	12
Fianna Fáil	Peter Byrne*	12.36	1,770	1,779	1,802	1,828	1,846	1,911	1,976	2,371	2,522			
Fianna Fáil	Barbara Ann Murphy*	11.44	1,639	1,644	1,654	1,660	1,760	1,797	1,832	2,010	2,058	2,130	2,158	2,179
Fine Gael	Oliver Walsh*	10.92	1,564	1,579	1,583	1,593	1,624	1,727	1,778	1,947	2,116	2,197	2,208	2,234
Fine Gael	Trevor Masterson	9.14	1,309	1,329	1,381	1,390	1,443	1,487	1,520	1,567	1,788	1,860	1,877	1,892
Independent	Seán Doyle*	8.98	1,286	1,324	1,365	1,397	1,431	1,510	1,657	1,722	1,880	2,500		
Fine Gael	Kathleen Codd-Nolan	8.60	1,232	1,252	1,288	1,294	1,332	1,374	1,398	1,438	1,751	1,845	1,879	1,929
Fine Gael	Patrick Kavanagh*	7.31	1,047	1,060	1,108	1,133	1,156	1,220	1,250	1,330				
Fianna Fáil	Willie Kavanagh	6.90	988	998	1,001	1,004	1,013	1,157	1,196					
Sinn Féin	Noreen Sheridan	5.07	727	750	755	780	805	823						
Independent	Jackser Owens	6.78	972	987	1,006	1,038	1,067	1,100	1,312	1,370	1,465			
Progressive Democrats	Seán Quirke	2.42	639	650	664	672	686							
Labour	Winnie O'Leary	2.42	346	372	377	466								
Fine Gael	Tara Manning	1.93	277	287										
Labour	Anne Robinson	1.86	266	572	577	613								
Green	Michael Cuthbert	1.84	264											
Electorate: 24,684 Valid: 14,326 (58.04%) Spoilt: 322 Quota: 2,322 Turnout: 14,648 (59.34%)

=== Gorey ===
Gorey - 4 seats
Party	Candidate	FPv%	Count								
Party	Candidate	FPv%	1	2	3	4	5	6	7	8	9
Fine Gael	Michael W. D'Arcy*	15.58	1,952	1,984	2,091	2,201	2,459	2,571			
Independent	Declan McPartlin	13.63	1,707	1,762	1,807	1,896	1,992	2,150	2,162	2,617	
Fianna Fáil	Lorcan Allen*	11.94	1,496	1,511	1,553	1,611	1,717	2,258	2,273	2,430	2,452
Sinn Féin	Jimmy Fleming	11.81	1,479	1,559	1,594	1,742	1,876	1,982	1,991	2,116	2,148
Fine Gael	Peter Earle	9.02	1,130	1,166	1,219	1,287	1,416	1,538	1,556	2,012	2,069
Fine Gael	Michael Kinsella	8.95	1,121	1,141	1,213	1,273	1,429	1,521	1,532		
Fianna Fáil	Pat Rath	8.82	1,105	1,130	1,149	1,190	1,274				
Fine Gael	Colin Webb	6.69	838	867	1,038	1,153					
Labour	Bobby Ireton	5.56	696	749	786						
Fine Gael	Kay O'Gorman	4.85	608	621							
Independent	Eddie Colfer	1.64	206								
Socialist Workers	John Carty	1.51	189								
Electorate: 20,363 Valid: 12,527 (61.52%) Spoilt: 253 Quota: 2,506 Turnout: 12,780 (62.76%)

=== New Ross ===
New Ross - 5 seats
Party	Candidate	FPv%	Count							
Party	Candidate	FPv%	1	2	3	4	5	6	7	8
Fianna Fáil	Sean Connick	15.70	1,914	1,994	2,172					
Sinn Féin	John Dwyer	11.22	1,368	1,406	1,548	1,575	1,601	1,678	1,960	1,986
Fine Gael	Larry O'Brien*	11.09	1,352	1,406	1,485	1,504	1,573	2,002	2,157	
Fianna Fáil	Jimmy Curtis*	10.80	1,317	1,334	1,359	1,365	1,593	1,772	2,026	2,042
Fine Gael	Denis Kennedy*	10.48	1,278	1,308	1,389	1,403	1,415	1,589	1,690	1,722
Fianna Fáil	Michael Sheehan*	8.51	1,038	1,074	1,159	1,215	1,277	1,310		
Fianna Fáil	Martin Murphy	8.40	1,024	1,039	1,046	1,053	1,348	1,503	1,661	1,695
Fine Gael	Patrick Whelan	7.90	963	986	1,020	1,022	1,161			
Fianna Fáil	Seamus Whelan*	7.13	869	877	886	890				
Labour	Bobby Dunphy	5.49	669	737						
Independent	David Maher	3.30	402							
Electorate: 21,918 Valid: 12,194 (55.63%) Spoilt: 322 Quota: 2,033 Turnout: 12,516 (57.10%)

=== Wexford ===
Wexford - 7 seats
Party	Candidate	FPv%	Count											
Party	Candidate	FPv%	1	2	3	4	5	6	7	8	9	10	11	12
Independent	Padge Reck*	8.85	1,608	1,640	1,665	1,735	1,808	1,970	2,059	2,064	2,206	2,326		
Labour	Ted Howlin*	8.50	1,544	1,599	1,609	1,838	1,923	2,035	2,323					
Sinn Féin	Maurice Roche	8.41	1,529	1,552	1,561	1,586	1,598	1,664	1,706	1,709	1,830	1,888	1,950	1,955
Fine Gael	Pat Codd*	8.04	1,462	1,475	1,494	1,498	1,601	1,607	1,638	1,642	1,678	1,841	2,151	2,166
Fianna Fáil	Lisa McDonald	7.66	1,392	1,418	1,537	1,567	1,630	1,688	1,805	1,809	1,918	2,204	2,343	
Independent	Leo Carthy*	7.50	1,363	1,460	1,634	1,646	1,668	1,712	1,791	1,797	1,899	1,937	2,301	
Fianna Fáil	Gus Byrne*	6.23	1,133	1,145	1,294	1,319	1,356	1,409	1,445	1,449	1,509	1,737	1,801	1,827
Fine Gael	Jim Moore	5.63	1,023	1,074	1,171	1,178	1,281	1,289	1,353	1,356	1,426	1,451		
Fianna Fáil	Noel Keane	5.47	995	997	1,039	1,045	1,072	1,083	1,091	1,092	1,105			
Fine Gael	Anna Fenlon*	5.35	972	1,008	1,025	1,127	1,290	1,424	1,480	1,490	1,648	1,692	1,920	1,945
Green	Danny Forde	4.68	850	876	890	949	973	1,035	1,077	1,088				
Fine Gael	Philomena Roche	4.37	795	805	811	826								
Independent	Michael Furlong	4.35	791	800	805	856	873							
Labour	Gordon Rochford	4.15	755	774	781	849	905	935						
Labour	Davy Hynes	4.05	736	745	751									
Fianna Fáil	Josephine Doyle*	4.02	731	740										
Independent	Angela Leahy	2.72	495											
Electorate: 34,708 Valid: 18,174 (52.36%) Spoilt: 425 Quota: 2,272 Turnout: 18,599 (53.59%)
