= 1985 Wexford County Council election =

Part of the 1985 Irish local elections

← 1979	20 June 1985	1991 →

All 21 seats on Wexford County Council
	First party	Second party	Third party
Party	Fianna Fáil	Fine Gael	Labour
Seats won	11	6	1
Seat change	+1	-1	-1
	Fourth party
Party	Independent
Seats won	3
Seat change	+1
- Map showing the area of Wexford County Council
Council control after election
Fianna Fail

An election to Wexford County Council took place on 20 June 1985 as part of the Irish local elections. 21 councillors were elected from four local electoral areas (LEAs) for a five-year term of office on the electoral system of proportional representation by means of the single transferable vote (PR-STV). This term was extended for a further year, to 1991.

== Results by party ==
Party	Seats	±	First Pref. votes	FPv%	±%
Fianna Fáil	11	+1	19,652	46.32	
Fine Gael	6	-1	11,998	28.28	
Labour	1	-1	3,540	8.34	
Independent	3	+1	5,697	13.43	
Totals	21	-	42,428	100.00	—

== Results by local electoral area ==
=== Enniscorthy ===
Enniscorthy: 5 seats
Party	Candidate	FPv%	Count					
Party	Candidate	FPv%	1	2	3	4	5	6
Fianna Fáil	John Browne TD*		2,265					
Fine Gael	Ivan Yates TD		1,770					
Fianna Fáil	Michael Sinnott*		1,589	1,723				
Independent	Seán Doyle		1,137	1,256	1,264	1,355	1,586	1,619
Fianna Fáil	Hugh Dunne		1,048	1,271	1,273	1,317	1,355	1,395
Fine Gael	Jack Bolger		944	960	981	997	1,090	1,739
Fine Gael	Thomas Neville		803	808	823	834	875	
Labour	Andy Doyle		503	541	547	578		
Workers' Party	Richard Synott		144	151	152			
Independent	George Mullaly		91	98	99			
Electorate: 16,743 Valid: 10,294 (62.56%) Spoilt: 181 Quota: 1,716 Turnout: 10,475

=== Gorey ===
Gorey: 5 seats
Party	Candidate	FPv%	Count			
Party	Candidate	FPv%	1	2	3	4
Fianna Fáil	Lorcan Allen*		2,554			
Fine Gael	Francis D'Arcy*		1,742			
Fianna Fáil	Rory Murphy*		1,252	1,415	1,477	1,643
Fianna Fáil	Joe Murphy		1,242	1,709		
Fine Gael	Jim Gahan		1,120	1,152	1,170	1,384
Fine Gael	Deirdre Bolger*		1,065	1,166	1,227	1,478
Labour	Bobby Ireton		467	525	566	
Labour	Thomas Davitt		384	402	413	
Independent	Michael O'Connor		248	283		
Electorate: 16,743 Valid: 10,294 (62.56%) Spoilt: 181 Quota: 1,716 Turnout: 10,475

=== New Ross ===
New Ross: 5 seats
Party	Candidate	FPv%	Count							
Party	Candidate	FPv%	1	2	3	4	5	6	7	8
Fianna Fáil	Hugh Byrne TD*		2,325							
Fianna Fáil	Jimmy Curtis*		1,497	1,774						
Fianna Fáil	Jim Walsh*		1,417	1,522	1,583	1,612	1,755			
Fine Gael	John T. Browne*		1,150	1,182	1,184	1,225	1,247	1,251	1,487	1,615
Fianna Fáil	Seamus Whelan		967	1,150	1,216	1,244	1,275	1,305	1,398	1,494
Fine Gael	Louise Hennessy		597	613	615	657	706	716	940	1,107
Fine Gael	John Hayes		579	616	621	637	655	659		
Sinn Féin	Jim Dwyer		455	469	473	516				
Labour	Denis North*		445	462	463	580	691	724	778	
Labour	Michael O'Brien		190	195	196					
Workers' Party	Ingrid O'Brien		142	147	147					
Independent	John O'Brien		23	25	25					
Electorate: 16,227 Valid: 9,787 (61.54%) Spoilt: 199 Quota: 1,632 Turnout: 9,986

=== Wexford ===
Wexford: 6 seats
Party	Candidate	FPv%	Count														
Party	Candidate	FPv%	1	2	3	4	5	6	7	8	9	10	11	12	13	14	15
Fine Gael	Avril Doyle TD*		1,518	1,529	1,544	1,555	1,568	1,580	1,618	1,636	1,756						
Fianna Fáil	Gus Byrne*		1,449	1,485	1,500	1,516	1,547	1,564	1,610	1,617	1,652	1,711	1,897				
Independent	Padge Reck		1,229	1,239	1,258	1,295	1,359	1,387	1,490	1,508	1,523	1,650	1,711	1,717	1,927		
Labour	Sen. Brendan Howlin		1,137	1,144	1,156	1,170	1,208	1,222	1,266	1,454	1,482	1,602	1,634	1,646	1,738	1,772	
Independent	Leo Carthy*		959	970	982	990	1,005	1,018	1,030	1,109	1,220	1,256	1,279	1,283	1,338	1,367	1,736
Fianna Fáil	Tommy Howlin*		787	796	807	818	823	841	851	873	935	948	1,061	1,130	1,157	1,165	1,285
Fine Gael	Toddy Moore		710	712	714	718	724	727	732	767	844	863	870	872	888	895	
Fianna Fáil	Robert Lambert		674	675	678	682	687	695	698	720	735	743	920	966	985	987	1,024
Fianna Fáil	Sean O'Gorman		586	588	603	615	623	628	649	651	658	669					
Independent	Thomas Doyle		534	538	552	561	563	570	574	577							
Workers' Party	Michael Enright		480	484	486	505	525	564	578	583	588						
Labour	Joan Fennelly		414	416	416	417	424	432	436								
Independent	Philip Kelly		384	385	389	407	445	556	578	589	601	709	729	733			
Independent	John Roche*		322	325	329	336	351	358									
Sinn Féin	Sean Finn		320	323	327	341	351										
Independent	Jimmy Hayes		287	291	293	308											
Independent	Desmond McCabe		208	211	214												
Independent	Jim O'Dowd		154	157													
Independent	Olive Brennan		121														
Electorate: 20,731 Valid: 12,273 (60.19%) Spoilt: 202 Quota: 1,754 Turnout: 12,479
