= County Hall, Wexford =

Municipal building in County Wexford, Ireland

Coordinates: 52.3439°N 6.4900°W

County Hall is a municipal facility in Carricklawn, Wexford, County Wexford, Ireland.

== History ==
Wexford County Council had previously been based in an aging facility in Hill Street. The new building, which was designed by Robin Lee Architecture, cost over €50 million to build. It was officially opened by Brendan Howlin, Minister for Public Expenditure and Reform, in 2011. It received a Civic Trust Award in 2012.
