= 2019 Wexford by-election =

By-election to the 32nd Dáil

- 29 November 2019
- Turnout: 40,382 (35.3%)
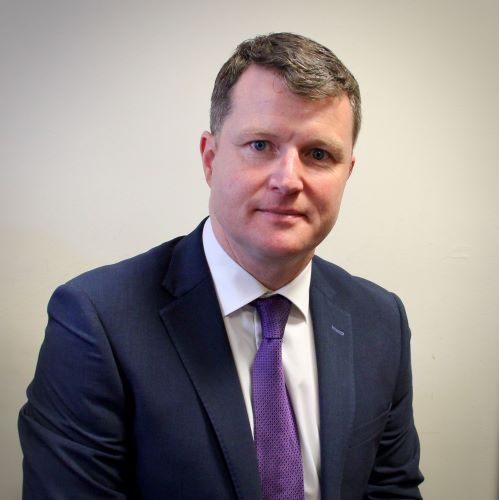

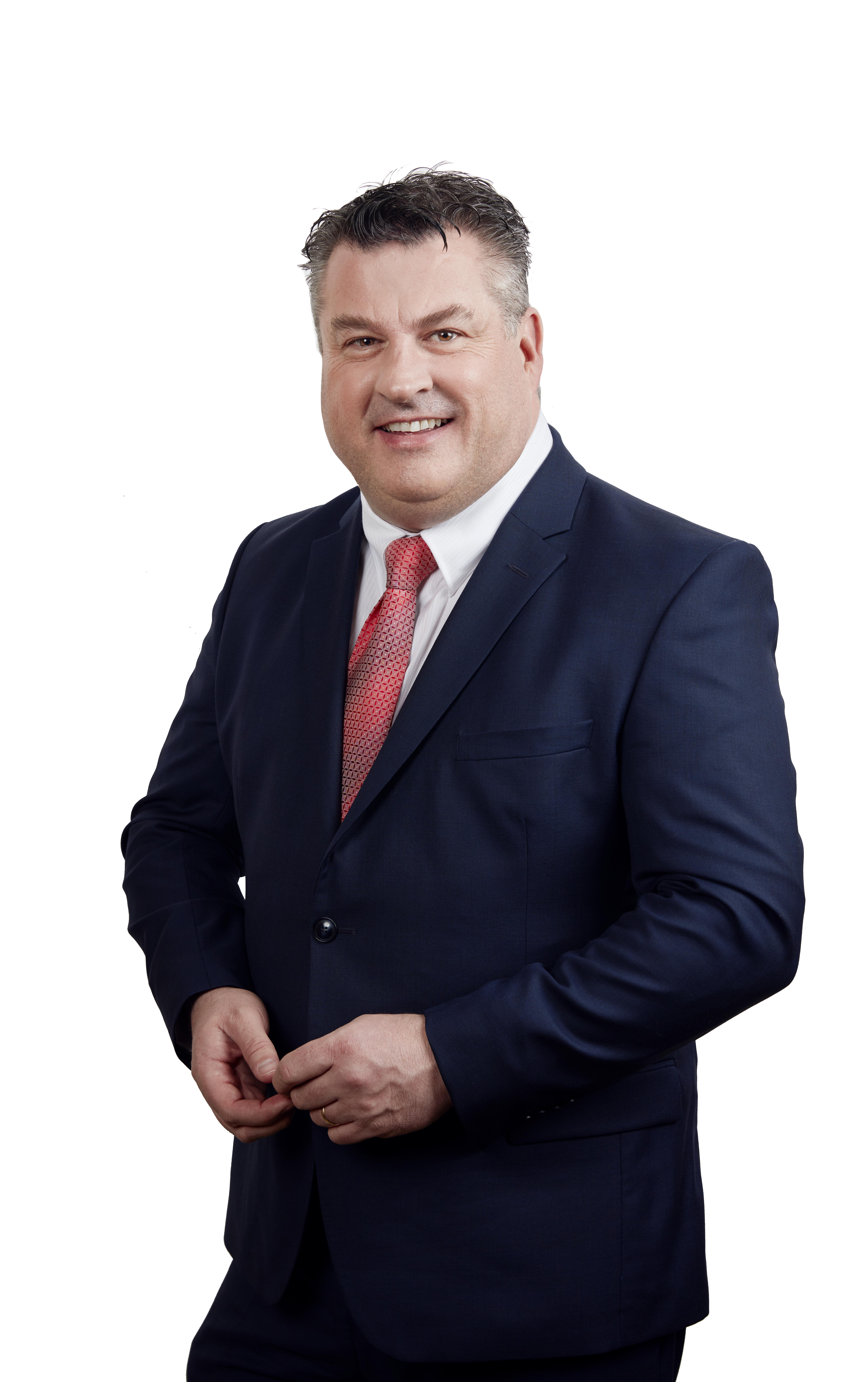

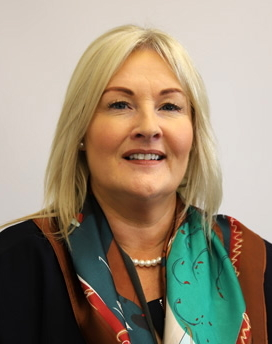
| Nominee | Malcolm Byrne | George Lawlor | Verona Murphy |
| Party | Fianna Fáil | Labour | Fine Gael |
| First preferences | 12,506 | 8,024 | 9,543 |
| Percentage | 31.2% | 20.0% | 23.8% |
| Final count | 18,830 | 14,476 | - |
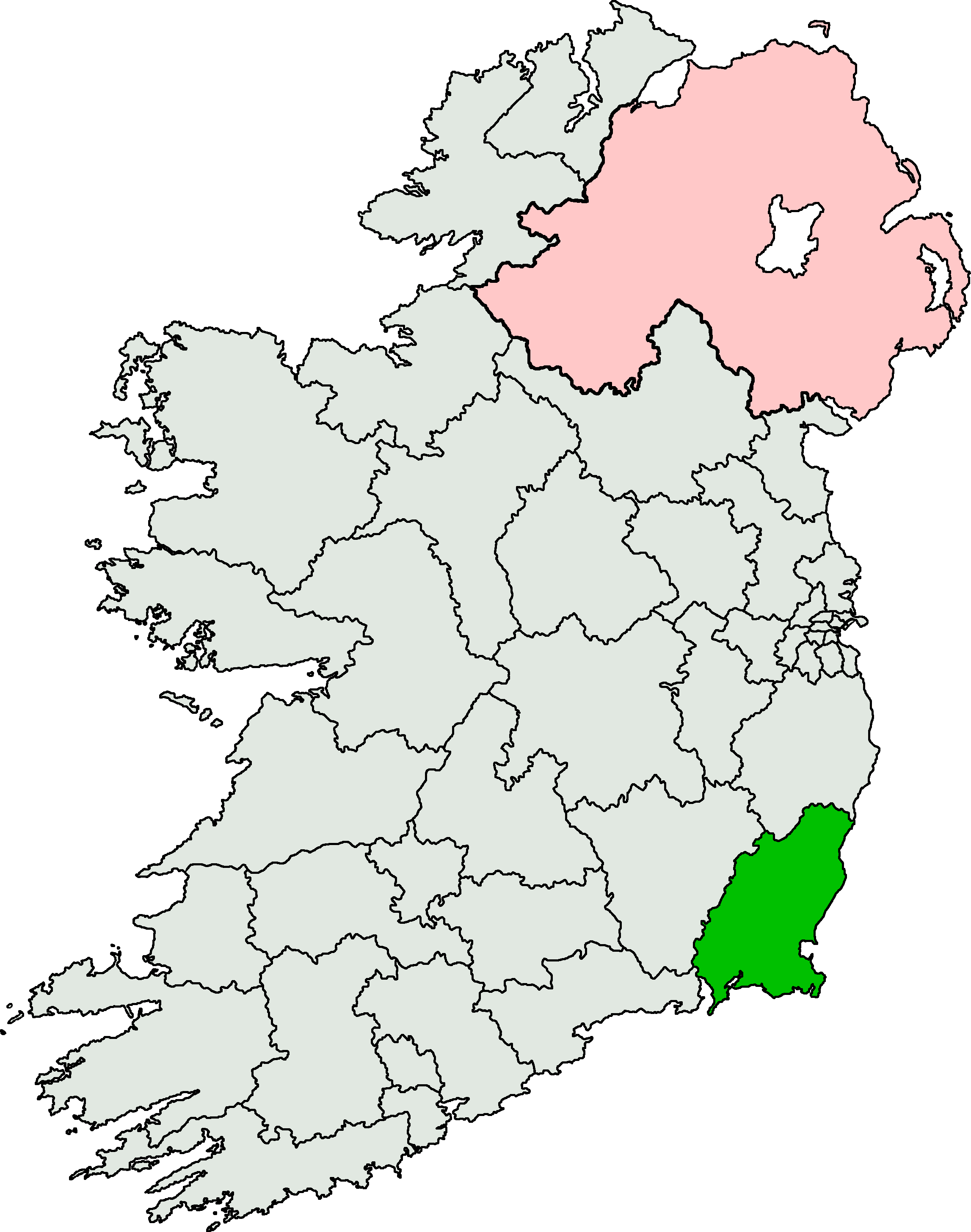
- Wexford shown within Ireland
TD before election
Mick Wallace
Inds. 4 Change
TD after election
Malcolm Byrne
Fianna Fáil

A Dáil by-election was held in the constituency of Wexford in Ireland on Friday, 29 November 2019, to fill a vacancy in the 32nd Dáil. It followed the election of Independents 4 Change Teachta Dála (TD) Mick Wallace to the European Parliament.

It was held on the same day as three other by-elections in Cork North-Central, Dublin Fingal and Dublin Mid-West. The Electoral (Amendment) Act 2011 stipulates that a by-election in Ireland must be held within six months of a vacancy occurring. The by-election writ was moved in the Dáil on 7 November 2019.

At the 2016 general election, the electorate of Wexford was 109,861, and the constituency elected one Labour Party TD, one Fianna Fáil TD, one I4C TD and two Fine Gael TDs.

The by-election was won by the Fianna Fáil candidate Malcolm Byrne, a member of Wexford County Council.

Three of the candidates were sitting Wexford County Councillors; Malcolm Byrne, Jim Codd and George Lawlor. Johnny Mythen was a former Wexford County Councillor while Melissa O'Neill was a former Kilkenny County Councillor.

This was the first occasion the Irish Freedom Party contested any national election as a registered political party and, alongside Cork North-Central, the first time Aontú contested by-elections.

Byrne subsequently lost his seat at the February 2020 general election. His defeat after only 71 days made him the TD with the second-shortest term of service. Byrne was subsequently elected to the Seanad in April 2020, with Mythen and Murphy being elected to the Dáil in the 2020 general election.

== Result ==
2019 Wexford by-election
| Party | Candidate | FPv% | Count | | | | |
| Party | Candidate | FPv% | 1 | 2 | 3 | 4 | 5 |
|---|---|---|---|---|---|---|---|
| Fianna Fáil | Malcolm Byrne | 31.2 | 12,506 | 12,660 | 13,082 | 14,729 | 18,830 |
| Fine Gael | Verona Murphy | 23.8 | 9,543 | 9,620 | 9,943 | 10,836 | |
| Labour | George Lawlor | 20.0 | 8,024 | 8,112 | 8,517 | 10,907 | 14,476 |
| Sinn Féin | Johnny Mythen | 10.3 | 4,125 | 4,344 | 4,665 | | |
| Green | Karin Dubsky | 6.2 | 2,490 | 2,745 | 3,037 | | |
| Aontú | Jim Codd | 5.2 | 2,102 | 2,395 | | | |
| People Before Profit | Cinnamon Blackmore | 1.6 | 659 | | | | |
| Irish Freedom | Melissa O'Neill | 1.2 | 489 | | | | |
| Independent | Charlie Keddy | 0.3 | 130 | | | | |
Electorate: 114,483 Valid: 40,068 Spoilt: 314 (0.8%) Quota: 20,035 Turnout: 40,382 (35.3%)
