= Cathal Byrne =

Irish politician

Senator Cathal Byrne
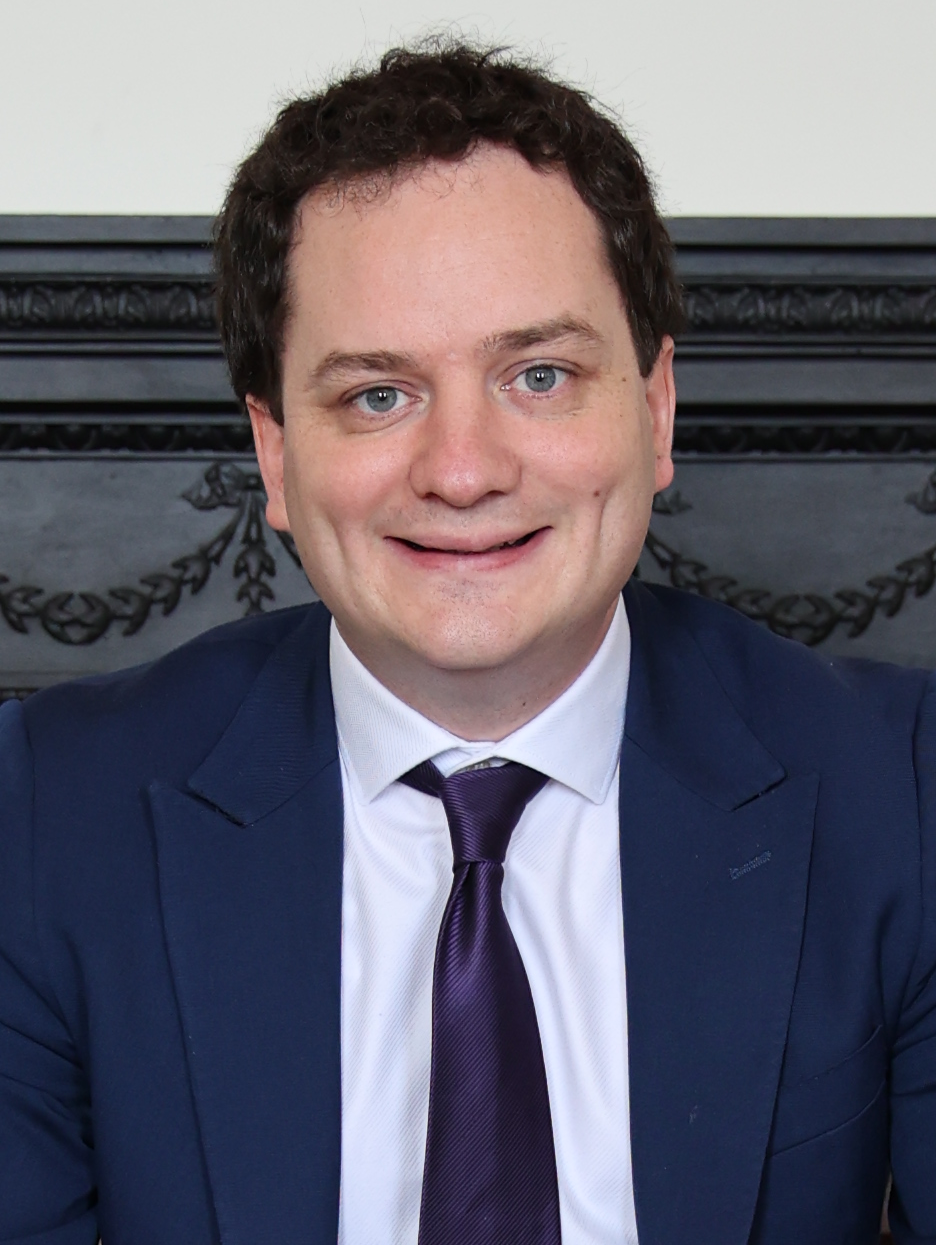
- Byrne in 2025

Senator
- Incumbent
- Assumed office January 2025
- Constituency: Cultural and Educational Panel

Personal details
- Born: 1991/1992 (age 34–35) County Wexford, Ireland
- Party: Fine Gael
- Children: 2
- Education: Trinity College Dublin
- Website: cathalbyrne.ie

Cathal Byrne (born 1991/1992) is an Irish Fine Gael politician who has been a senator for the Cultural and Educational Panel since January 2025.

He was a member of Wexford County Council for the Enniscorthy area from May 2019 to January 2025. He unsuccessfully contested the Wexford constituency at the 2024 general election.

He graduated from Trinity College Dublin with a degree in Law and Business, and a Masters in Law. He is a qualified solicitor.
