= Garry Laffan =

Irish hurler

Personal information
- Native name: Garraí Lafán (Irish)
- Born: 1975 Barntown, County Wexford, Ireland
- Occupation: Politician

Sport
- Sport: Hurling
- Position: Full-forward
Club
- Years: Club
- Glynn–Barntown
Club titles
	Football	Hurling
Wexford titles	1	0
Inter-county
- Years: County
- 1994–2002: Wexford
Inter-county titles
- Leinster titles: 2
- All-Irelands: 1
- NHL: 0
- All Stars: 0

Garry Laffan (born 1975) is an Irish politician, hurling coach and former dual player. At club level he played with Glynn–Barntown and was also a member of the Wexford senior hurling team. Laffan is also an elected representative with Wexford County Council.

== Playing career ==
Laffan first played for the Glynn–Barntown club in the juvenile and underage grades as a dual player. He won Wexford U21HC and U21FC titles in 1993 and 1994, by which stage he had progressed to adult level. Laffan won a Wexford SFC medal in 1996, following Glynn–Barntown's 2-03 to 0-07 defeat of Kilanerin in the final.

Laffan first appeared on the inter-county scene with Wexford as a member of the under-21 team. He won a Leinster U21HC medal before facing defeat by Galway in the 1996 All-Ireland under-21 final. Laffan made his senior team debut in the Oireachtas Tournament in 1994. He won a Leinster SHC medal in 1996, before playing at full-forward when Wexford beat Limerick in the 1996 All-Ireland final.

A second Leinster SHC medal followed for Laffan in 1997, when Wexford retained the title after a defeat of Kilkenny. He retired from inter-county hurling in 2002.

== Coaching career ==
Laffan became part of Tony Dempsey's Wexford under-21 hurling management team in 2010. His three seasons with the team saw Wexford lose consecutive provincial finals to Dublin before suffering a heavy defeat to Kilkenny.

At club level, Laffan spent a number of seasons as manager of Glenealy. He guided the team to back-to-back Wicklow SHC titles in 2017 and 2018. Laffan later took charge of the Tara Rocks club and managed them to the Wexford IAHC title in 2021.

== Political career ==
Laffan was elected to Wexford County Council as a Fianna Fáil candidate in the 2019 local elections. He was elected mayor of Wexford in June 2021.

== Honours ==
=== Player ===
Glynn–Barntown

- Wexford Senior Football Championship: 1996

Wexford

- All-Ireland Senior Hurling Championship: 1996
- Leinster Senior Hurling Championship: 1996, 1997
- Leinster Under-21 Hurling Championship: 1996

=== Management ===
Glenealy

- Wicklow Senior Hurling Championship: 2017, 2018

Tara Rocks

- Wexford Intermediate A Hurling Championship: 2021
