= Wicklow–Wexford =

Dáil constituency (2024-present)

- Dáil constituency
- Location of Wicklow–Wexford within Ireland
- Interactive map of constituency boundaries since the 2024 general election
- Major settlements: Arklow; Aughrim; Ferns; Gorey; Rathdrum

Current constituency
- Created: 2024
- Seats: 3
- TDs: Brian Brennan (FG); Malcolm Byrne (FF); Fionntán Ó Súilleabháin (SF)
- Local government area: County Wexford; County Wicklow
- Created from: Wexford; Wicklow
- EP constituency: South

Wicklow–Wexford is a parliamentary constituency represented in Dáil Éireann, the lower house of the Irish parliament or Oireachtas, from the 2024 general election. The constituency elects three deputies (Teachtaí Dála, commonly known as TDs) on the system of proportional representation by means of the single transferable vote (PR-STV).

== History and boundaries ==
The 2023 report of the Electoral Commission recommended that at the next general election, a new three-seat constituency of Wicklow–Wexford be created, with a transfer of territory from the constituencies of Wexford and Wicklow.

This was done to ensure compliance with the constitutional requirement for one TD per 20,000 to 30,000 of the population and with an overall increase from 160 to 174 TDs. The Commission found that the constituencies of Wexford and Wicklow had a combined population sufficient to justify the allocation of 11 seats and therefore decided to create a new constituency called Wicklow–Wexford in order to meet the criteria set out under the scope of its review. The two pre-existing five-seat constituencies of Wicklow and Wexford transferred one seat each to the new constituency which then gained an additional seat to meet the three-seat minimum for a constituency.

None of the ten TDs who had been elected at the 2020 Irish general election for the constituencies of Wexford and Wicklow were resident in the proposed constituency.

For the 2024 general election, the Electoral (Amendment) Act 2023 defines the constituency as:

"In the county of Wexford the electoral divisions of:

Ballindaggan, Ballycarney, Ballymore, Castledockrell, Ferns, Kilbora, Kilcormick, Kilrush, Moyacomb, Newtownbarry, Rossard, St. Mary's, The Harrow, Tinnacross, Tombrack, in the former Rural District of Enniscorthy;
Ardamine, Balloughter, Ballybeg, Ballycanew, Ballyellis, Ballygarrett, Ballylarkin, Ballynestragh, Cahore, Coolgreany, Courtown, Ford, Gorey Rural, Gorey Urban, Huntingtown, Kilcomb, Kilgorman, Killenagh, Killincooly, Kilnahue, Limerick, Monamolin, Monaseed, Rossminoge, Wells, Wingfield, in the former Rural District of Gorey;

and in the county of Wicklow, the electoral divisions of;

Arklow Rural, Aughrim, Ballinaclash, Ballinacor, Ballinderry, Ballyarthur, Cronebane, Dunganstown East, Dunganstown South, Dunganstown West, Ennereilly, Kilbride, Ovoca, Rathdrum, in the former Rural District of Rathdrum;
Aghowle, Ballingate, Ballinglen, Ballybeg, Carnew, Coolattin, Coolboy, Cronelea, Kilballyowen, Killinure, Kilpipe, Money, Rath, Shillelagh, Tinahely, in the former Rural District of Shillelagh;
and
Arklow No. 1 Urban, Arklow No. 2 Urban."

== TDs ==
Teachtaí Dála (TDs) for Wicklow–Wexford 2024–
Key to parties: FF = Fianna Fáil; FG = Fine Gael; SF = Sinn Féin
| Dáil | Election | Deputy (Party) | Deputy (Party) | Deputy (Party) |
| 34th | 2024 | Brian Brennan (FG) | Malcolm Byrne (FF) | Fionntán Ó Súilleabháin (SF) |

Note: The columns in this table are used only for presentational purposes, and no significance should be attached to the order of columns. For details of the order in which seats were won at each election, see the detailed results of that election.

== Elections ==
=== 2024 general election ===
2024 general election: Wicklow–Wexford
| Party | Candidate | FPv% | Count | | | | | |
| Party | Candidate | FPv% | 1 | 2 | 3 | 4 | 5 | 6 |
|---|---|---|---|---|---|---|---|---|
| Fine Gael | Brian Brennan | 23.1 | 8,820 | 8,856 | 9,040 | 9,112 | 9,266 | 10,339 |
| Fianna Fáil | Malcolm Byrne | 21.7 | 8,311 | 8,344 | 8,492 | 8,577 | 8,727 | 9,156 |
| Sinn Féin | Fionntán Ó Súilleabháin | 20.2 | 7,719 | 7,790 | 7,882 | 8,475 | 8,769 | 10,222 |
| Fianna Fáil | Pat Kennedy | 14.3 | 5,478 | 5,493 | 5,559 | 5,597 | 5,743 | 6,609 |
| Independent | Peir Leonard | 10.0 | 3,824 | 4,134 | 4,284 | 4,606 | 5,192 | |
| Aontú | Sinéad Boland | 3.5 | 1,350 | 1,545 | 1,576 | 1,667 | | |
| PBP–Solidarity | Aislinn O'Keeffe (Note: O'Keeffe is a member of Solidarity.) | 2.7 | 1,021 | 1,089 | 1,294 | | | |
| Green | Ann Walsh | 2.4 | 897 | 910 | | | | |
| Independent Ireland | Frances Lawlor | 1.7 | 648 | | | | | |
| Independent | Ilsa-Maria Nolan | 0.4 | 168 | | | | | |
Electorate: 63,003 Valid: 38,236 Spoilt: 301 Quota: 9,560 Turnout: 61.2%
