= Fionntán Ó Súilleabháin =

Irish politician

Fionntán Ó Súilleabháin TD
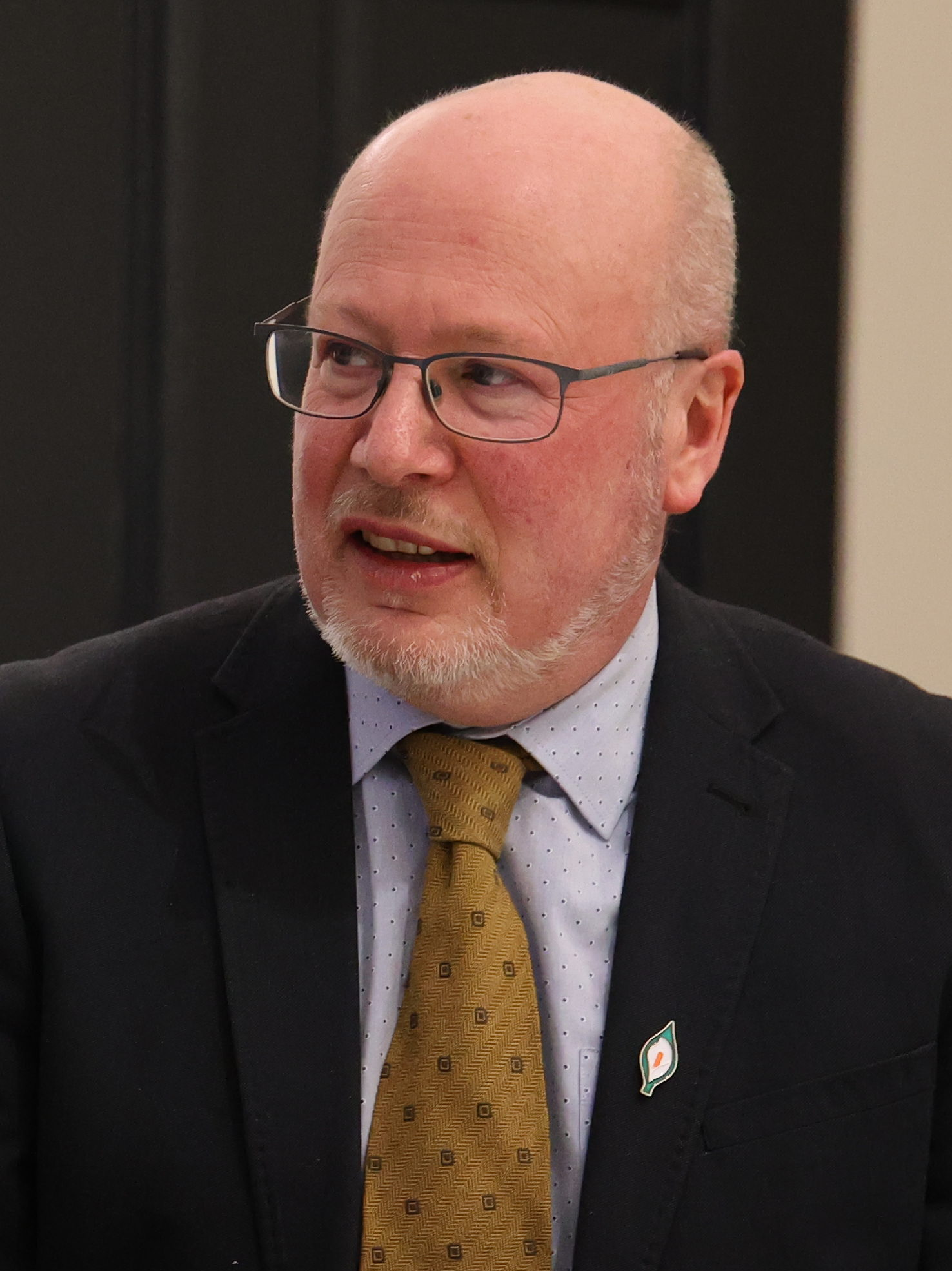
- O Suilleabháin in 2024

Teachta Dála
- Incumbent
- Assumed office November 2024
- Constituency: Wicklow–Wexford

Personal details
- Born: 1968/1969 (age 56–57)
- Party: Sinn Féin

Fionntán Ó Súilleabháin (born 1968/1969) is an Irish Sinn Féin politician who has been a Teachta Dála (TD) for the Wicklow–Wexford constituency since the 2024 general election. Ó Súilleabháin was previously a Wexford County Councillor for the Gorey local electoral area between 2014 and 2024. Prior to his election as a TD, Ó Súilleabháin was a special education teacher in Gaelscoil Moshíológ.

In June 2023, at a Wexford County Council meeting, Ó Súilleabháin raised concerns about the planned emergency migrant centre at Slaney Manor in Barntown, which was set to house up to 213 people. He highlighted local frustration with the lack of consultation or information about the project, suggesting this gap had led to misinformation and fear. Ó Súilleabháin expressed dissatisfaction with the current immigration process, particularly the Irish Refugee Protection Programme (IPAS), claiming that many of those arriving were economic migrants, not refugees fleeing war or persecution. Ó Súilleabháin suggested that 40% of people entering IPAS had no documents, contributing to a lack of transparency. He also criticised the government's handling of the issue, suggesting that it had become a "cash cow" for businesses profiting from housing refugees. Ó Súilleabháin further described the system as "inhumane" and costly, calling for it to be phased out. His comments stirred discomfort among other councillors, with Independent councillor Mary Farrell defending the migrants as victims of war. Despite the criticism, Ó Súilleabháin maintained that fear of being labelled "far-right" or "racist" prevented a frank debate on immigration.

Dáil	Election	Deputy (Party)	Deputy (Party)	Deputy (Party)
34th	2024	Brian Brennan (FG)	Malcolm Byrne (FF)	Fionntán Ó Súilleabháin (SF)
