= Malcolm Byrne =

Irish politician (born 1974)

Malcolm Byrne TD
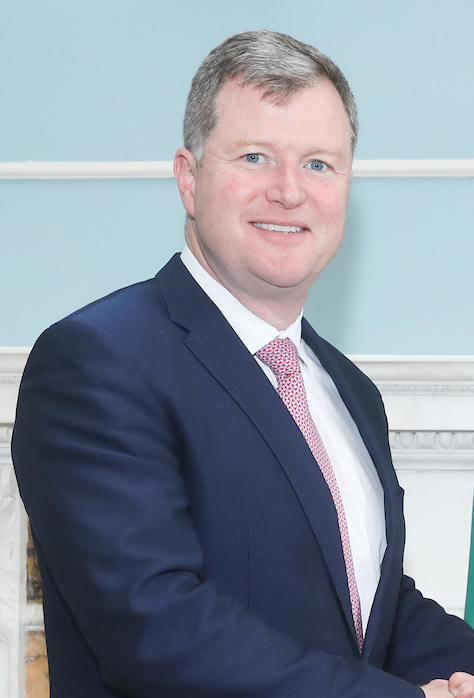
- Byrne in 2024

Teachta Dála
- Incumbent
- Assumed office November 2024
- Constituency: Wicklow–Wexford
- In office November 2019 – February 2020
- Constituency: Wexford

Senator
- In office 29 June 2020 – 30 November 2024
- Constituency: Cultural and Educational Panel

Personal details
- Born: 25 April 1974 (age 52) Gorey, County Wexford, Ireland
- Party: Fianna Fáil
- Education: University College Dublin

Malcolm Byrne (born 25 April 1974) is an Irish Fianna Fáil politician who has served as a Teachta Dála (TD) for the Wicklow–Wexford constituency since the 2024 general election. He previously served as a Senator for the Cultural and Educational Panel from 2020 to 2024. He represented the Wexford constituency from 2019 to 2020.

He was elected to the Dáil in a by-election in November 2019, but lost his seat in the subsequent general election in February 2020, before regaining it in 2024. He was a member of Wexford County Council from 2009 to 2019.

== Early life ==
Born in Gorey, County Wexford, in 1974. Byrne is the eldest child from a family of five. He attended CBS secondary school and Loreto and CBS primary schools in Gorey, later studying law at University College Dublin. He was secretary of the Kevin Barry Cumann while at UCD. Byrne was involved in student politics; he was education officer for both UCD Students' Union and the Union of Students in Ireland, and served as an executive member of the European Students' Union.

He has described the 1989 Tiananmen Square protests and massacre and the fall of the Berlin Wall as influencing his decision to enter politics.

He was Head of Communications with the Higher Education Authority until 2019, and has been Vice-President of the National Youth Council of Ireland. In 2014, he was named as one of the European 40 Under 40, in the European Young Leaders Programme.

== Political career ==
When first elected to Gorey Town Council on the first count in 1999, he was its youngest member at the age of 25. He topped the poll again at the 2004 local elections. He was first elected to Wexford County Council in 2009 for the Gorey local electoral area, and elected Chairman following his 2014 re-election.

In January 2006, The Sun included Byrne's picture on the cover of its Irish edition beneath the headline "Bertie's FF Man in Gay Web Shame," revealing that Byrne had a profile on the dating website Gaydar. Byrne responded at the time: "I have not, nor have I ever, done anything illegal and I am not a hypocrite in any way. My views on gay rights issues are well known. I am not married with four children or anything like that, so there is no suggestion of hypocrisy." His family and political career suffered as a result and he was not selected for candidacy in the 2007 general election following this incident. Byrne later described how it was a journalist from The Gorey Echo had first approached him: "The first few questions were about roads. Then the journalist said, 'Are you aware you have a profile on this dating website?'" When he confirmed that the profile was his, Byrne experienced a sleepless night before The Gorey Echo outed him locally: "I was ringing around people I knew and my parents were ringing around people … my grandmother didn't know and a lot of my extended family and my friends didn't know". Gorey Echo group editor Tom Mooney defended publication by saying he believed Byrne's behaviour to be "unfitting of a public representative".

Byrne was a candidate for Fianna Fáil in the 2016 general election in the Wexford constituency, but did not win a seat.

He contested the 2019 European Parliament election for Fianna Fail in the South constituency, having unexpectedly beaten Cork TD Billy Kelleher in the vote for the party's nomination. However, Kelleher was later added to the ticket. Fianna Fáil then divided the constituency geographically, asking people in counties Carlow, Kilkenny, Laois, Offaly, Tipperary, Waterford, Wexford and Wicklow to vote for Byrne, and those in counties Cork, Kerry, Clare and Limerick to vote for Kelleher. Kelleher won 11.69% of the first preference votes (FPV) and was elected on the 17th count. Byrne won 9.62% of the FPV, was eliminated on the 16th count.

Byrne was elected as a TD at the 2019 Wexford by-election. Andrew Bolger was co-opted to Byrne's seat on Wexford County Council following his election to the Dáil. His maiden speech was about housing solutions and the need to address the challenges facing Generation Rent. In an interview he said he could envisage a United Ireland where the 12th of July and Saint Patrick's Day were public holidays and spoke about how Ireland needs to ensure Unionists feel at home in a new agreed state and that may mean addressing issues such as Ireland joining the Commonwealth.

Byrne lost his Dáil seat at the next general election, on 8 February 2020, following what he called "a dirty campaign". His defeat after only 71 days made him the TD with the second-shortest term of service, after the Anti H-Block TD Kieran Doherty, who died on hunger strike in August 1981 only 52 days after his election.

On 31 March 2020, Byrne was elected to Seanad Éireann at the 2020 election. He was named as Fianna Fáil spokesperson on Higher Education, Innovation and Science by Taoiseach Micheál Martin in July 2020.

As a senator, Byrne has been a vocal critic of human rights abuses in China. In February 2021, he became co-chair of the Inter-Parliamentary Alliance on China, along with Senator Barry Ward of Fine Gael. Byrne is a member of the cross-party Oireachtas Friends of Israel in the Oireachtas.

At the 2024 general election, Byrne was elected to the Dáil. He was subsequently appointed Cathaoirleach of the Joint Committee on Artificial Intelligence.

On 4 June 2026, Byrne announced his resignation as Cathaoirleach of the Joint Committee on Artificial Intelligence, following his arrest on suspicion of drink driving in May 2026.

== Personal life ==
Byrne is openly gay. As of 2020, he is single and has described politics as "almost like an addiction", which makes relationships difficult. He lives in Gorey.

In March 2025, Byrne was injured during the theft of his phone in London.

In May 2026, Byrne was arrested on suspicion of drink driving after failing a breath test at a Garda checkpoint in Dublin.

Dáil	Election	Deputy (Party)	Deputy (Party)	Deputy (Party)	Deputy (Party)	Deputy (Party)
2nd	1921	Richard Corish (SF)	James Ryan (SF)	Séamus Doyle (SF)	Seán Etchingham (SF)	4 seats 1921–1923
3rd	1922	Richard Corish (Lab)	Daniel O'Callaghan (Lab)	Séamus Doyle (AT-SF)	Michael Doyle (FP)	4 seats 1921–1923
4th	1923	Richard Corish (Lab)	James Ryan (Rep)	Robert Lambert (Rep)	Michael Doyle (FP)	Osmond Esmonde (CnaG)
5th	1927 (Jun)	Richard Corish (Lab)	James Ryan (FF)	James Shannon (Lab)	Michael Doyle (FP)	John Keating (NL)
6th	1927 (Sep)	Richard Corish (Lab)	James Ryan (FF)	Denis Allen (FF)	Michael Jordan (FP)	Osmond Esmonde (CnaG)
7th	1932	Richard Corish (Lab)	James Ryan (FF)	Denis Allen (FF)	John Keating (CnaG)	Osmond Esmonde (CnaG)
8th	1933	Richard Corish (Lab)	James Ryan (FF)	Patrick Kehoe (FF)	John Keating (CnaG)	Osmond Esmonde (CnaG)
8th	1936 by-election	Richard Corish (Lab)	James Ryan (FF)	Patrick Kehoe (FF)	John Keating (CnaG)	Denis Allen (FF)
9th	1937	Richard Corish (Lab)	James Ryan (FF)	John Keating (FG)	John Esmonde (FG)	Denis Allen (FF)
10th	1938	Richard Corish (Lab)	James Ryan (FF)	John Keating (FG)	John Esmonde (FG)	Denis Allen (FF)
11th	1943	Richard Corish (Lab)	James Ryan (FF)	John O'Leary (Lab)	John Esmonde (FG)	Denis Allen (FF)
12th	1944	Richard Corish (Lab)	James Ryan (FF)	John O'Leary (NLP)	John Keating (FG)	Denis Allen (FF)
12th	1945 by-election	Brendan Corish (Lab)	James Ryan (FF)	John O'Leary (NLP)	John Keating (FG)	Denis Allen (FF)
13th	1948	Brendan Corish (Lab)	James Ryan (FF)	John O'Leary (NLP)	John Esmonde (FG)	Denis Allen (FF)
14th	1951	Brendan Corish (Lab)	James Ryan (FF)	John O'Leary (Lab)	Anthony Esmonde (FG)	Denis Allen (FF)
15th	1954	Brendan Corish (Lab)	James Ryan (FF)	John O'Leary (Lab)	Anthony Esmonde (FG)	Denis Allen (FF)
16th	1957	Brendan Corish (Lab)	James Ryan (FF)	Seán Browne (FF)	Anthony Esmonde (FG)	Denis Allen (FF)
17th	1961	Brendan Corish (Lab)	James Ryan (FF)	Lorcan Allen (FF)	Anthony Esmonde (FG)	4 seats 1961–1981
18th	1965	Brendan Corish (Lab)	James Kennedy (FF)	Lorcan Allen (FF)	Anthony Esmonde (FG)	4 seats 1961–1981
19th	1969	Brendan Corish (Lab)	Seán Browne (FF)	Lorcan Allen (FF)	Anthony Esmonde (FG)	4 seats 1961–1981
20th	1973	Brendan Corish (Lab)	Seán Browne (FF)	Lorcan Allen (FF)	John Esmonde (FG)	4 seats 1961–1981
21st	1977	Brendan Corish (Lab)	Seán Browne (FF)	Lorcan Allen (FF)	Michael D'Arcy (FG)	4 seats 1961–1981
22nd	1981	Brendan Corish (Lab)	Ivan Yates (FG)	Lorcan Allen (FF)	Michael D'Arcy (FG)	Hugh Byrne (FF)
23rd	1982 (Feb)	Seán Browne (FF)	Ivan Yates (FG)	Lorcan Allen (FF)	Michael D'Arcy (FG)	Hugh Byrne (FF)
24th	1982 (Nov)	Avril Doyle (FG)	Ivan Yates (FG)	John Browne (FF)	Michael D'Arcy (FG)	Hugh Byrne (FF)
25th	1987	Avril Doyle (FG)	Ivan Yates (FG)	John Browne (FF)	Brendan Howlin (Lab)	Hugh Byrne (FF)
26th	1989	Michael D'Arcy (FG)	Ivan Yates (FG)	John Browne (FF)	Brendan Howlin (Lab)	Séamus Cullimore (FF)
27th	1992	Avril Doyle (FG)	Ivan Yates (FG)	John Browne (FF)	Brendan Howlin (Lab)	Hugh Byrne (FF)
28th	1997	Michael D'Arcy (FG)	Ivan Yates (FG)	John Browne (FF)	Brendan Howlin (Lab)	Hugh Byrne (FF)
29th	2002	Paul Kehoe (FG)	Liam Twomey (Ind.)	John Browne (FF)	Brendan Howlin (Lab)	Tony Dempsey (FF)
30th	2007	Paul Kehoe (FG)	Michael W. D'Arcy (FG)	John Browne (FF)	Brendan Howlin (Lab)	Seán Connick (FF)
31st	2011	Paul Kehoe (FG)	Liam Twomey (FG)	John Browne (FF)	Brendan Howlin (Lab)	Mick Wallace (Ind.)
32nd	2016	Paul Kehoe (FG)	Michael W. D'Arcy (FG)	James Browne (FF)	Brendan Howlin (Lab)	Mick Wallace (I4C)
32nd	2019 by-election	Paul Kehoe (FG)	Michael W. D'Arcy (FG)	James Browne (FF)	Brendan Howlin (Lab)	Malcolm Byrne (FF)
33rd	2020	Paul Kehoe (FG)	Verona Murphy (Ind.)	James Browne (FF)	Brendan Howlin (Lab)	Johnny Mythen (SF)
34th	2024	4 seats since 2024	Verona Murphy (Ind.)	James Browne (FF)	George Lawlor (Lab)	Johnny Mythen (SF)

Dáil	Election	Deputy (Party)	Deputy (Party)	Deputy (Party)
34th	2024	Brian Brennan (FG)	Malcolm Byrne (FF)	Fionntán Ó Súilleabháin (SF)
