= Pat Codd =

Irish politician (died 2006)

Senator
- In office 23 April 1975 – 27 October 1977
- Constituency: Agricultural Panel

Personal details
- Born: County Wexford, Ireland
- Died: 2006 County Wexford, Ireland
- Party: Fine Gael

Patrick Codd (died April 2006) was a Fine Gael politician from Enniscorthy, County Wexford in Ireland. He was a senator from 1975 to 1977.

Codd was elected to the 13th Seanad on the Agricultural Panel at a by-election on 23 April 1975 following the deaths of Bob Aylward and Cornelius O'Callaghan. He stood unsuccessfully in the Wexford constituency at the 1977 general election and did not contest the subsequent elections to the 14th Seanad. He later sought a Fine Gael nomination for the 1982 general election, but at the selection conference he was beaten by Ivan Yates, a then little-known 20-year-old member of Enniscorthy Urban District Council.

At the 1979 local elections he was elected as a member of Wexford County Council, serving until the 1985 local elections. He was chairman of the county council from 1984 to 1985, while his son-in-law Martin Dunbar was a Labour Party member of the council.

In later years he was the organiser of the Self-Help Ireland charity in the south-east region, and raised large sums of money for the organisation.
