= Lisa McDonald =

Irish politician (born 1974)

Wexford County Councillor
- Incumbent
- Assumed office May 2019
- Constituency: Rosslare
- In office July 2016 – May 2019
- Constituency: Wexford
- In office June 2004 – August 2007
- Constituency: Wexford

Senator
- In office 13 September 2007 – 25 May 2011
- Constituency: Nominated by the Taoiseach

Personal details
- Born: 9 July 1974 (age 52) County Wexford, Ireland
- Party: Fianna Fáil
- Spouse: Richard Simpson
- Children: 2
- Education: University College Dublin
- Profession: Solicitor

Lisa McDonald (born 9 July 1974) is an Irish Fianna Fáil politician, who was a member of Seanad Éireann from 2007 to 2011.

She was a member of Wexford County Council from 2004 to 2007. She was an unsuccessful candidate at the 2007 general election for the Wexford constituency. She was nominated by the Taoiseach, Bertie Ahern to Seanad Éireann on 3 August 2007.

From County Wexford, McDonald is married, with two children. A solicitor, she studied law at University College Dublin before moving back to Wexford, where she now has her own firm. While in college she was Chair of the Kevin Barry Cumann. She served on the Fianna Fáil National Executive from 1995 to 2004. She was the Fianna Fáil Seanad spokesperson for Equality and Law Reform from 2007 to 2011.

Following the death of councillor Fergie Kehoe, she was co-opted to fill the vacancy on Wexford County Council in July 2016 and was subsequently re-elected in 2019 and in 2024, for the Rosslare area. She was once again an unsuccessful candidate for the Wexford constituency at the 2020 general election.
