= Wexford County Council =

Local authority of County Wexford, Ireland

Wexford County Council Comhairle Contae Loch Garman
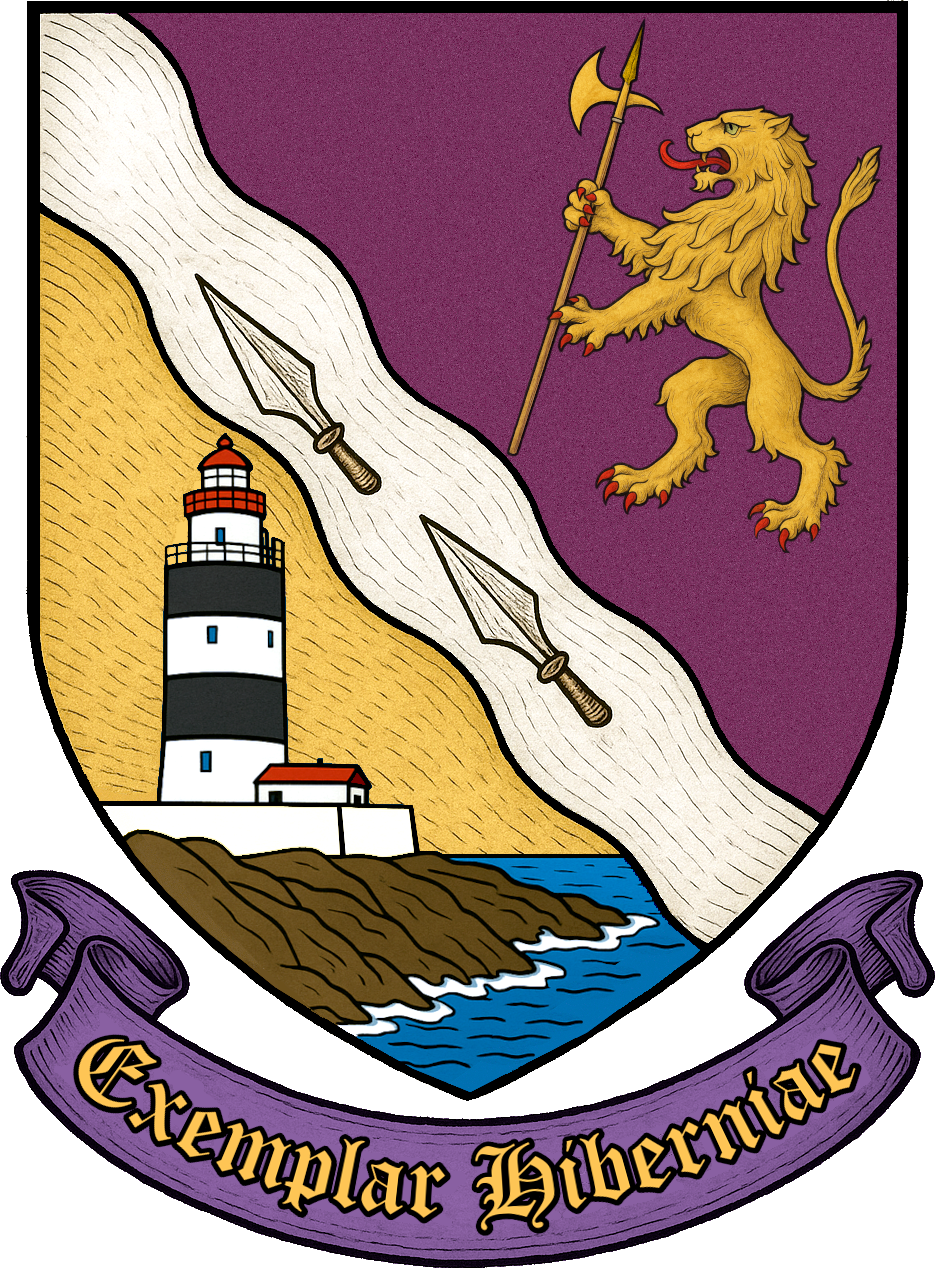

Type
- Type: County council of County Wexford

History
- Founded: 1 April 1899

Leadership
- Cathaoirleach: Lisa McDonald, FF

Structure
- Seats: 34
- Political groups: Fine Gael (8) Fianna Fáil (7) Wexford Ind. Alliance (5) Sinn Féin (3) Labour (2) Aontú (1) Independent Ireland (1) Independent (7)

Elections
- Last election: 7 June 2024

Motto
- Latin: Exemplar Hiberniae "An example to Ireland"

Meeting place
- County Hall, Wexford

Website
- Official website

The area governed by the council

Wexford County Council (Irish: Comhairle Contae Loch Garman) is the local authority of County Wexford, Ireland. As a county council, it is governed by the Local Government Act 2001. The council is responsible for housing and community, roads and transportation, urban planning and development, amenity and culture, and environment. The council has 34 elected members. Elections are held every five years and are by single transferable vote. The head of the council has the title of Cathaoirleach (chairperson). The county administration is headed by a chief executive, currently Eddie Taaffe. The county town is Wexford.

== History ==
Wexford County Council was established on 1 April 1899 under the Local Government (Ireland) Act 1898 for the administrative county of County Wexford. It succeeded the judicial county of Wexford, with the addition of the part of the town of New Ross which was formerly in County Kilkenny. The first meeting of the council was on 22 April 1899.

From 1899 to 1920, meetings of the county council were held in the Grand Jury room of the old Wexford Courthouse on Commercial Quay. After the old courthouse burnt down in the Irish War of Independence, a new courthouse was established on the site of the old jail in Hill Street in 1930. The county council relocated to the site in Hill Street at the same time. After the condition of the properties in Hill Street proved inadequate, the county council moved to a modern County Hall in Carricklawn in September 2011 and a modern courthouse was opened on Belvedere Road in 2018.

In 2014, the town councils of Enniscorthy, Gorey and New Ross and the borough council of Wexford were dissolved under the Local Government Reform Act 2014. Their jurisdiction was transferred to the county council.

== Regional Assembly ==
Wexford County Council has three representatives on the Southern Regional Assembly who are part of the South-East Strategic Planning Area Committee.

== Elections ==
The Local Government (Ireland) Act 1919 introduced the electoral system of proportional representation by means of the single transferable vote (PR-STV) for the 1920 Irish local elections. County Wexford was divided into 4 county electoral areas to elect the 19 members of the council. This electoral system has been retained, with 34 members of Wexford County Council now elected for a five-year term of office from 6 multi-member local electoral areas (LEAs).

Year	FF	FG	Lab	SF	Aon	WIA	PBP	Ind.	Total
2024	9	8	2	3	1	5	0	6	34
2019	12	9	2	2	1	—N/a	0	8	34
2014	11	9	2	5	—N/a	—N/a	1	6	34
2009	5	10	4	0	—N/a	—N/a	0	2	21
2004	6	7	1	3	—N/a	—N/a	—N/a	4	21
1999	9	8	1	0	—N/a	—N/a	—N/a	3	21
1991	8	8	1	0	—N/a	—N/a	—N/a	4	21
1985	11	6	1	0	—N/a	—N/a	—N/a	3	21

== Local electoral areas and municipal districts ==
County Wexford is divided into LEAs, defined by electoral divisions, for elections to the council. These are grouped into borough and municipal districts for the local exercise of the powers of the local authority. The municipal district which contains the administrative area of the former borough of Wexford is referred to as a borough district.

Municipal district	LEA	Definition	Seats
Enniscorthy		Ballindaggan, Ballycarney, Ballyhoge, Bree, Castledockrell, Enniscorthy Rural, Enniscorthy Urban, Ferns, Kilbora, Killoughrum, Kilrush, Kiltealy, Marshalstown, Moyacomb, Newtownbarry, Rossard, St. Marys, The Leap and Tombrack.	6
Gorey–Kilmuckridge	Gorey	Ardamine, Balloughter, Ballybeg, Ballyellis, Ballylarkin, Ballynestragh, Coolgreany, Courtown, Gorey Rural, Gorey Urban, Huntingtown, Kilcomb, Kilgorman, Kilnahue, Limerick, Monaseed, Rossminoge and Wingfield.	6
Gorey–Kilmuckridge	Kilmuckridge	Ballycanew, Ballygarrett, Ballyhuskard, Ballymore, Ballyvaldon, Bolaboy, Cahore, Castle Ellis, Castle Talbot, Edermine, Ford, Kilcormick, Killenagh, Killincooly, Kilmallock, Monamolin, The Harrow, Tinnacross and Wells.	4
New Ross		Adamstown, Ballyanne, Ballyhack, Barrack Village, Barronstown, Carnagh, Carrickbyrne, Castleboro, Clonleigh, Clonroche, Dunmain, Fethard, Horetown, Inch, Kilgarvan, Killann, Killesk, Kilmokea, New Ross Rural, New Ross Urban, Newbawn, Old Ross, Oldcourt, Rathroe, Rochestown, Rosbercon Urban, Templeludigan, Templetown, Tintern, Whitechurch (in the former Rural District of New Ross), Whitechurch (in the former Rural District of Wexford) and Whitemoor.	6
Rosslare		Aughwilliam, Ballymitty, Bannow, Bridgetown, Clongeen, Duncormick, Harperstown, Harristown, Kilcowan, Killag, Killinick, Kilmore, Kilscoran, Ladys Island, Mayglass, Newcastle, Rosslare, St. Helens, Tacumshin, Taghmon and Tomhaggard; and those parts of the electoral divisions of Drinagh and Rathaspick not contained in the local electoral area of Wexford.	5
Borough District of Wexford	Wexford	Ardcavan, Ardcolm, Artramon, Carrick, Forth, Glynn, Kilbride, Killurin, Kilpatrick, Wexford No. 1 Urban, Wexford No. 2 Urban, Wexford No. 3 Urban, Wexford Rural; and those parts of the electoral divisions of Drinagh and Rathaspick to the north of a line drawn as follows: Commencing at the boundary between the electoral divisions of Rathaspick and Wexford Rural at the N25 and then proceeding in a south-easterly direction along the N25 to the roundabout at the junction of the N25 and the R730, and then proceeding along an easterly projection to the boundary between the electoral divisions of Drinagh and Rosslare.	7
Total			34

== Councillors ==
The following were elected at the 2024 Wexford County Council election.

=== 2024 seats summary ===
Party	Seats
Fianna Fáil	9
Fine Gael	8
Wexford Ind. Alliance	5
Sinn Féin	3
Labour	2
Aontú	1
Independent	6

=== Councillors by electoral area ===
This list reflects the order in which councillors were elected on 7 June 2024.

Council members from 2024 election
Local electoral area	Name	Party
Enniscorthy	Cathal Byrne (Note: Replaced during term, see table below for details.)	Fine Gael
Enniscorthy	Aidan Browne	Fianna Fáil
Enniscorthy	Barbara-Anne Murphy	Fianna Fáil
Enniscorthy	John O'Rourke	Independent
Enniscorthy	Jackser Owens	Independent
Enniscorthy	Pat Kehoe	Fine Gael
Gorey	Donal Kenny	Fianna Fáil
Gorey	Nicky Boland	Wexford Ind. Alliance
Gorey	Joe Sullivan (Note: Changed party, see table below for details.)	Fianna Fáil
Gorey	Darragh McDonald	Fine Gael
Gorey	Anthony Donohoe	Fine Gael
Gorey	Fionntán Ó Súilleabháin	Sinn Féin
Kilmuckridge	Mary Farrell	Independent
Kilmuckridge	Pip Breen	Fianna Fáil
Kilmuckridge	Oliver Walsh	Fine Gael
Kilmuckridge	Paddy Kavanagh	Wexford Ind. Alliance
New Ross	Pat Barden	Wexford Ind. Alliance
New Ross	Michael Sheehan	Fianna Fáil
New Ross	John Fleming	Fianna Fáil
New Ross	Marty Murphy	Wexford Ind. Alliance
New Ross	Bridín Murphy	Fine Gael
New Ross	John Dwyer	Independent
Rosslare	Jim Codd	Aontú
Rosslare	Ger Carthy	Independent
Rosslare	Frank Staples	Fine Gael
Rosslare	Lisa McDonald	Fianna Fáil
Rosslare	Aoife Rose O'Brien	Sinn Féin
Wexford	George Lawlor	Labour
Wexford	Robbie Staples	Fine Gael
Wexford	Garry Laffan	Fianna Fáil
Wexford	Leonard Kelly	Independent
Wexford	Tom Forde	Sinn Féin
Wexford	Raymond Shannon	Wexford Ind. Alliance
Wexford	Catherine Walsh	Labour

==== Co-options ====
Party	Outgoing	LEA	Reason	Date	Co-optee
Sinn Féin	Fionntán Ó Súilleabháin	Gorey	Elected to 34th Dáil for Wicklow–Wexford at the 2024 general election	16 December 2024	Craig Doyle
Labour	George Lawlor	Wexford	Elected to 34th Dáil for Wexford at the 2024 general election	16 December 2024	Vicky Clancy Barron
Fine Gael	Cathal Byrne	Enniscorthy	Elected to 27th Seanad at the 2025 Seanad election	31 January 2025	Patricia Byrne

==== Changes in affiliation ====
Name	LEA	Elected as	New affiliation	Date
Michael Sheehan	New Ross	Fianna Fáil	Independent	4 November 2024
Joe Sullivan	Gorey	Fianna Fáil	Independent	26 June 2026
Michael Sheehan	New Ross	Independent	Independent Ireland	1 September 2026
