= Conor Devitt =

Irish hurler and Gaelic footballer

Personal information
- Native name: Conchúr Mac Daibhéid (Irish)
- Born: 1995 (age 30–31) Killinierin, County Wexford, Ireland
- Occupation: Secondary school teacher

Sport
- Sport: Hurling
- Position: corner back
Club
- Years: Club
- Kilanerin–Ballyfad
Club titles
- Wexford titles: 0
College
- Years: College
- 2013-2016: University College Cork
College titles
- Fitzgibbon titles: 0
Inter-county
- Years: County
- 2015-present: Wexford
Inter-county titles
- Leinster titles: 0
- All-Irelands: 0
- NHL: 0
- All Stars: 0

Conor Devitt (born 1995) is an Irish hurler and Gaelic footballer who plays for Wexford Championship club Kilanerin–Ballyfad. He has lined out with the Wexford senior teams in both codes on a number of occasions.

== Career ==
Devitt first came to prominence as a dual player at juvenile and underage levels with the Kilanerin–Ballyfad club before eventually joining the club's top adult teams. He came on as a substitute when the club beat Ballyboughal to win the 2017 Leinster Intermediate Club Championship. Devitt first played at inter-county level during a two-year stint with the Wexford minor team before losing consecutive All-Ireland finals with the under-21 team. He was drafted onto the Wexford senior hurling team in 2015 before later making a number of appearances with the Wexford senior football team.

== Honours ==
Killanerin-Ballyfad

- Leinster Intermediate Club Football Championship: 2017
- Wexford Intermediate Football Championship: 2017

Wexford

- Leinster Under-21 Hurling Championship: 2014, 2015
