= Shane Roche =

Wexford Gaelic footballer and manager

Shane Roche is a Gaelic football manager and former player. He played for the Geraldine O'Hanrahans club and at senior level for the Wexford county team and later managed Wexford.

== Career ==
When Paul Galvin left Wexford in 2020, Roche, who was working with him, became interim manager in September 2020. He was formally ratified as manager and was given a two-year contract in January 2021. He chose to step down as Wexford manager in 2022. Roche was a selector under Galvin's management and took over from Galvin amid the impact of the COVID-19 pandemic on Gaelic games and was in charge for the last two league games.

Roche led Wexford to a Division Four Shield in the 2021 National League and to sixth position finish in Division Four of the 2022 National Football League; however, Dublin defeated the team twice in the Leinster Senior Football Championship. Roche was a squad member when Wexford played in the 2008 and 2011 Leinster SFC finals. He scored 2–04 against Carlow in the 2011 Leinster Senior Football Championship semi-final and was awarded 'man of the match'.

Roche is a Geraldine O'Hanrahans player and he got a win over Wicklow as well in the 2021 championship. Another achievement for Shane Roche as Wexford manager was defeating Offaly in the Leinster Preliminary Round in 2022 with Offaly being two divisions above Wexford at the time.

Outside of football, Roche is a P.E. teacher in St Peter's College, Wexford.

Sporting positions
Preceded by Paul Galvin	Wexford Senior Football Manager; 2020–2022	Succeeded by John Hegarty
