= Tommy Carr (Gaelic footballer) =

Dublin player

Personal information
- Native name: Tomás Ó Carra (Irish)
- Born: 31 October 1961 (age 65) Dublin, Ireland

Sport
- Sport: Gaelic football
- Position: Right half-back
Club
- Years: Club
- Lucan Sarsfields
Inter-county
- Years: County
- Dublin
Inter-county titles
- Leinster titles: 5
- All-Irelands: 1
- NFL: 2
- All Stars: 1

Tommy Carr is an Irish strength and conditioning coach and former Gaelic footballer who played for the Dublin county team. He later became involved in coaching and media work.

== Playing career ==
Carr received an All Star in 1991 in the same year that he won a National Football League medal with Dublin. He won his second league medal with Dublin in 1993.

== Managerial career ==
Carr was the Dublin manager between 1997 and 2001, a period that proved an unsuccessful period for Dublin. During this era the current Dublin manager, Dessie Farrell, was the captain of the Dublin football team until Carr was replaced by Tommy Lyons.

Carr was an advisor to the Wexford senior football team "on physical fitness and mental attitude matters" in 2002 under the management of Ger Halligan.

He went on to manage Roscommon between 2002 and 2005, and was appointed manager of Cavan in 2008.

He left the job as Cavan manager in July 2010.

In 2011, he was appointed manager of the Westmeath minor team. This was six years after he turned down the opportunity to succeed Páidí Ó Sé as manager of the senior team.

== Media career ==
In 2016, while taking a year out from the county game, Carr worked as co-commentator on RTÉ's TV coverage. He has also been on RTÉ on other occasions.

== Personal life ==
Carr is a graduate of University College Galway. He also has a degree in strength and conditioning from Setanta College. He lives near Mullingar. He moved there in 2002.

A resident in Holycross, Tommy's brother Declan Carr played senior hurling with Tipperary, winning two All-Ireland Senior Hurling Championship titles in 1989 and in 1991 as captain. Tommy Carr himself played football for Tipperary in 1984.

Carr is a strength and conditioning coach, and has worked in this capacity with his son Simon, the professional tennis player.

Preceded by Mickey Whelan	Dublin Senior Football Manager; 1997–2001	Succeeded by Tommy Lyons
