= Michael D'Arcy (disambiguation) =

Michael D'Arcy may refer to:

- Eamonn Darcy (footballer) (1933–2022), Irish footballer, full name Michael Edmund D'Arcy
- Michael D'Arcy (1934–2024), Irish politician
- Michael W. D'Arcy, (born 1970), Irish politician
