= Ben Brosnan =

Wexford Gaelic footballer

Personal information
- Native name: Beircheart Ó Brosnacháin (Irish)
- Born: 12 December 1987 (age 38) County Wexford
- Occupation: Business owner
- Height: 5 ft 10 in (178 cm)

Sport
- Sport: Gaelic football
- Position: Wing-forward
Club
- Years: Club
- Carnew Emmets
Inter-county
Years	County	Apps (scores)
2008–	Wexford	174 (3–116)
Inter-county titles
- NFL: 1

Ben Brosnan is a Gaelic footballer who has played for the Wexford county team. At club level, he has played with Castletown Liam Mellows (Wexford), his home side Bannow Ballymitty (Wexford) and also with Carnew Emmets (Wicklow). In March 2024, he made a record-equalling 174th appearance for Wexford, bringing him level with Brian Malone.

== Playing career ==
Brosnan was part of the Wexford panel in 2008. Wexford won Division 3 of the National League that year, beating Fermanagh in the final. Having beaten Meath and Laois, they reached that year's Leinster SFC final, but lost comprehensively to Dublin. However, subsequent victories over Down and Armagh, meant Wexford reached the All-Ireland SFC semi-final. Wexford lost that game to eventual All-Ireland SFC winner Tyrone.

In 2008, Brosnan was also part of the Wexford under-21 team, and was sent off in the Leinster semi-final and missed out on the final loss to Kildare.

In 2009, he was not part of the Wexford senior team; instead he played with the junior team.

Brosnan made his senior championship debut for Wexford in 2011.

He gave a number of high-scoring performances during the 2011 championship. He scored nine points in the 2011 Leinster SFC final, which Wexford lost to Dublin.

Against Offaly in the 2022 Leinster SFC preliminary round Brosnan scored 1–8.

== Personal life ==
Brosnan and fellow Wexford footballer Joey Wadding founded the sports wear brand Bodibro in 2015. In December 2024, Brosnan's father, Dan Brosnan, was sentenced to seven years in prison for repeated indecent assaults of an underage female that occurred in the 1980s. The jury also found him guilty of assaulting the girl’s younger sister on one occasion. Ben Brosnan spoke on behalf of his father during the hearing. The footballer told how the defendant had imbued him with a strong work ethic and called on the court for leniency.

== Career statistics ==
As of 9 April 2023.

Season	O'Byrne Cup		National League		All-Ireland		Total	
Season	Apps	Score	Apps	Score	Apps	Score	Apps	Score
2008	2	0–7	5	0–3	0	0–0	7	0–1
2009	2	0–3	1	0–0	0	0–0	3	0–0
2010	3	2–17	4	1–10	3	0–1	10	1–17
2011	2	0–6	7	2–26	5	0–32	14	0–40
2012	3	0–9	7	0–27	4	0–12	14	0–26
2013	0	0–0	7	0–24	4	0–11	11	0–27
2014	3	0–7	7	1–17	3	0–13	13	0–23
2015	3	0–8	7	0–21	3	0–7	13	0–20
2016	3	1–3	7	2–10	2	0–3	12	1–1
2017	3	2–11	5	0–17	3	1–10	11	0–29
2018	1	0–0	5	0–13	2	0–3	8	0–7
2019	3	0–2	7	2–5	2	0–3	12	0–6
2020					1	0–5		
2021					1	0–0		
2022					2	1–9		
2023					1	1–7		
Total	28	5–73	69	8–173	36	3–116	128	2–197
