= Joey Wadding =

Wexford Gaelic footballer

Personal information
- Born: County Wexford, Ireland

Sport
- Sport: Gaelic football
- Position: Corner-back
Club
- Years: Club
- ?: St Fintan's
Inter-county
- Years: County
- 2009–: Wexford

Joey Wadding is a Gaelic footballer from County Wexford, Ireland. He plays for the Wexford county team.

Wadding and fellow Wexford footballer Ben Brosnan founded the sports wear brand Bodibro in 2015.
