= 2014 All-Ireland Under-21 Hurling Championship final =

2014 All-Ireland Under-21 Hurling Championship Final
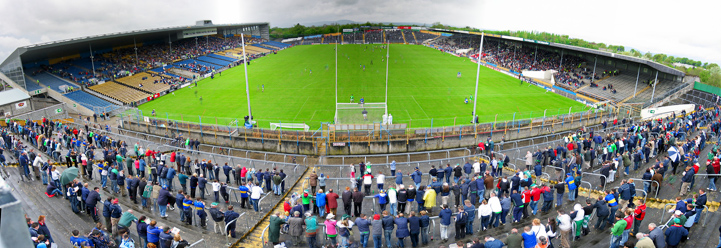
- Event: 2014 All-Ireland Under-21 Hurling Championship
Clare	Wexford
2-20	3-11
- Date: 13 September 2014
- Venue: Semple Stadium, Thurles
- Man of the Match: Tony Kelly
- Referee: Cathal McAllister (Cork)
- Attendance: 15,081

The 2014 All-Ireland Under-21 Hurling Championship final was a hurling match that was played at Semple Stadium, Thurles on 13 September 2014 to determine the winners of the 2014 All-Ireland Under-21 Hurling Championship, the 51st season of the All-Ireland Under-21 Hurling Championship, a tournament organised by the Gaelic Athletic Association for the champion teams of the four provinces of Ireland. The final was contested by Clare of Munster and Wexford of Leinster, with Clare winning by 2-20 to 3-11.

The All-Ireland final between Clare and Wexford was a unique occasion as it was the first ever championship meeting between the two teams. Clare were appearing in their fourth final in six years, while Wexford were lining out in their first All-Ireland decider since 2001.

Wexford opened the scoring with a point from a free by Jack Guiney after five minutes, however, Clare were quickly 1-2 to 0-1 courtesy of two points from Aaron Cunningham and a David Reidy goal. Guiney clipped over a point from a free to get Wexford back on the scoreboard. Clare had another great goal chance with a shot by Reidy, but Wexford 'keeper Oliver O'Leary made a great block, and corner back Andrew Kenny cleared the rebound off the line. At half time Clare led by 1-8 to 0-6.

Wexford fought back after the interval, with Conor McDonald, Jack Guiney and Conor Devitt all scoring points. Clare responded with a point by Bobby Duggan which was followed by a 38th-minute goal by Aaron Cunningham. Gearóid O'Connell got a point for Clare but then Wexford sub David Dunne lifted Wexford hopes with a goal in the 44th minute to put the score at 2-11 for Clare and 1-10 to Wexford. The final fifteen minutes was played at a frenetic pace. Dunne and Conor McDonald scored goals for Wexford but Clare had been striking points well, so with three minutes left, Clare led by 2-17 to 3-11, just three points between them. Wexford had two goal chances, one that went narrowly wide and another by McDonald that Clare 'keeper Keith Hogan saved for a 65. Further scores by team captain Tony Kelly and Colm Galvin got Clare over the line.

Clare's All-Ireland victory was their third in-a-row. The win gave them their fourth All-Ireland title over all and put them in joint fifth position with Limerick on the all-time roll of honour.

Wexford's All-Ireland defeat was their ninth since last winning the title in 1965.

== Match ==
=== Details ===
13 September 2014

Clare	2-20 - 3-11	Wexford
T Kelly 0-7; G O'Connell, J Shanahan 0-1 each; C Galvin 0-4; B Duggan 0-4 (3f); A Cunningham 1-2; D Reidy 1-1.	Report	J Guiney 0-7 (6f, 65); D Dunne 2-0; C McDonald 1-1; G Moore 0-2; C Devitt 0-1.

Semple Stadium, Thurles
Attendance: 15,081
Referee: C McAllister (Cork)

Clare	Wexford
