= John Hegarty (Gaelic footballer) =

Wexford Gaelic footballer

John Hagerty is a Gaelic football manager and former player who currently manages the Wexford county football team. He previously played for Wexford and Killanerin, as well as Leinster and UCD. He was a full-forward during his playing career.

He made 105 appearances for Wexford and his inter-county career went from 1995 up until 2006, scoring 21–125 in all that time. Wexford went from Division 4 to Division 1 National Football League during his career and they got to the Division 1 final back in 2005.

He played for Leinster and won a Railway Cup. He played for UCD and won a Sigerson Cup. He won six Wexford Senior Football Championship titles when he was playing and one Intermediate Football Championship title.

After his retirement, he went on to become a manager. He won Senior Football Championships with Kilanerin as a player-manager and Shelmaliers. He was appointed as Wexford manager in September 2022, following the retirement of Shane Roche. He continued to be Shelmaliers boss for the Senior Football Championship after his name was revealed for the Wexford post.

He is originally from Kilanerin and lives in Wexford town. Outside of football, Hegarty is the deputy principal in the Wexford CBS and was a Fine Gael member of Wexford County Council. He was the deputy Mayor of Wexford from 2021 to 2022.
