= Jo Jo Barrett =

Irish Gaelic football player and manager (1943–2021)

Personal information
- Native name: Seosamh Bairéid (Irish)
- Nickname: Jo Jo
- Born: Michael Joseph Barrett; 1943 Tralee, County Kerry, Ireland
- Died: 17 July 2021 (aged 77) Ardfert, County Kerry, Ireland
- Occupation: Journalist
- Height: 5 ft 10 in (178 cm)

Sport
- Sport: Gaelic football
- Position: Full-forward
Club
- Years: Club
- 1959–1975: Austin Stacks
Club titles
- Kerry titles: 2
Inter-county
| Years | County | Apps (scores) |
| 1961–1966 | Kerry | 8 (1–03) |
Inter-county titles
- Munster titles: 2
- All-Irelands: 1
- NFL: 1
- All Stars: 0

Michael Joseph M. Barrett (1943 – 17 July 2021), also known as Jo Jo Barrett, was an Irish Gaelic footballer and manager. He played for the Austin Stacks club and at senior level for the Kerry county team, before later serving as a club manager and, briefly, as manager of the Wexford county team.

== Playing career ==
Born in Tralee, County Kerry, Barrett first came to Gaelic football prominence as a schoolboy with Tralee CBS. He first appeared on the inter-county scene during a two-year tenure with the Kerry minor team before winning an All-Ireland Under-21 Championship title in 1964. Barrett was just out of the minor grade when he made his senior debut during the 1961 Grounds' Tournament semi-final against Offaly. He was just 19-years-old when he came on as a substitute in Kerry's 1962 All-Ireland final defeat of Roscommon. Barrett subsequently won a National League title and was part of four Munster Championship-winning teams. He experienced club success in the twilight of his career, winning County Championship titles with Austin Stacks.

== Management career ==
After retiring from club football, Barrett immediately took over the management of the Austin Stacks club and guided the team to the 1977 All-Ireland Club Championship title. He later steered Clara to a first Offaly County Championship title in 27 years. Barrett's tenure as manager of the Wexford senior football team ended in controversial circumstances when he received a two-year suspension by the GAA's Games Administration Committee for striking referee Mick Curley at the conclusion of their National League match against Cavan.

== Personal life and death ==
Barrett was the son of six-time All-Ireland-winner Joe Barrett. After a spell in the United States working as a barman, labourer and house painter, he returned in 1989 to work as a journalist in Dublin. Barrett died at his home in Barrow, Ardfert, County Kerry on 17 July 2021.

As of 1999, Barrett was working as a Gaelic Games reporter for the Evening Herald newspaper.

== Career statistics ==
| Team | Season | National League | | | Munster | | All-Ireland | | Total | |
| Team | Season | Division | Apps | Score | Apps | Score | Apps | Score | Apps | Score |
|---|---|---|---|---|---|---|---|---|---|---|
| Kerry | 1961–62 | Division 1 | 0 | 0–00 | 0 | 0–00 | 1 | 0–00 | 1 | 0–00 |
| Kerry | 1962–63 | Division 1 | 7 | 0–01 | 2 | 0–00 | 0 | 0–00 | 8 | 0–01 |
| Kerry | 1963–64 | Division 1 | 2 | 0–00 | 0 | 0–00 | 1 | 0–00 | 3 | 0–00 |
| Kerry | 1964–65 | Division 1 | 5 | 3–05 | 2 | 1–02 | 2 | 0–01 | 9 | 4–08 |
| Kerry | 1965–66 | Division 1 | 3 | 1–01 | 0 | 0–00 | — | | 5 | 1–06 |
| Career total | | | 17 | 4–07 | 4 | 1–02 | 4 | 0–01 | 25 | 5–10 |

== Honours ==
=== Player ===
Austin Stacks

- Kerry Senior Football Championship: 1973, 1975

Kerry

- All-Ireland Senior Football Championship: 1962
- Munster Senior Football Championship: 1962, 1963, 1964, 1965
- National Football League: 1962-63
- All-Ireland Under-21 Football Championship: 1964
- Munster Under-21 Football Championship: 1964

=== Manager ===
Austin Stacks

- All-Ireland Senior Club Football Championship: 1977
- Munster Senior Club Football Championship: 1976
- Kerry Senior Football Championship: 1976

Clara

- Offaly Senior Football Championship: 1991

Sporting positions
| Preceded by Cyril Hughes | Wexford Senior Football Manager; 1998–1999 | Succeeded by Ger Halligan |
