= 1999 International Rules Series =

- Event: International Rules Series
Australia	Ireland
114	122
- Ireland win series 122-114 on aggregate

First test
Australia	Ireland
62	70
- Date: 8 October 1999
- Venue: Melbourne Cricket Ground, Melbourne, Victoria
- Referee: Andrew Coates (Australia); Mick Curley (Ireland)
- Attendance: 64,326

Second test
Ireland	Australia
52	52
- Date: 15 October 1999
- Venue: Football Park, Adelaide, South Australia
- Referee: Andrew Coates (Australia); Mick Curley (Ireland)
- Attendance: 45,187

The 1999 International Rules Series was the sixth annual International Rules Series and the second time that a test series of international rules football has been played between Ireland and Australia since the series resumed in 1998.

The 1999 series was played in Australia with a two-test series used to decide the winner. The first test was played at the Melbourne Cricket Ground and the second test was played at Football Park in Adelaide. The 1999 Series was historic for the fact that a then record crowd of 64,326 turned up at the Melbourne Cricket Ground for the first test followed by a strong 45,187 fans at the second test in Adelaide. The two combined crowds equalled to 109,513, smashing the opening record at the previous year's series in Ireland.

The second test of the 1999 series in Adelaide finished as a draw, the first time such a result occurred in an international rules series.

== Series overview ==
The first test was played at the Melbourne Cricket Ground in front of a then record crowd of 64,326. In a high scoring game, the Irish were victorious with McDermott scoring Ireland's only goal of the match. The Australians were not disgraced, finishing just 8 points behind the Irish at the end of the night with Nathan Buckley kicking 5 overs. The second test provided a unique result. In a first for any international rules game, the second test finished as a draw. Despite this, the Irish still won the series by 8 points on aggregate (their winning margin of the first test). Nathan Buckley again scored 5 overs, prompting many to pronounce him the Jim Stynes Medal winner. Michael O'Loughlin and Shane Crawford each scored a goal each whilst for the Irish, McDermott and Tohill gained scores of 7 in front of over 45,000 people at Football Park in Adelaide. Ireland won the series 122–114 on aggregate.

== Squads ==
For Australian squad see: Australia 1999 Team
For Ireland squad see: Ireland 1999 Team

== Matches ==
=== First test ===
Team	1	2	3	4	Total
Australia	0.4.2	0.9.4	0.13.7	0.16.14	(62)
Ireland	0.6.3	0.9.6	1.15.9	2.16.10	(70)
Ireland won by 8	G.O.P	G.O.P	G.O.P	G.O.P	Final

Date	Friday, 8 October 1999
Scoring (AUS)	Goals: Nil Overs: Buckley 5, McRae 2, Waterhouse 2, Bell 2, Campbell 2, Leppitsch, Smith, West
Scoring (IRL)	Goals: Fallon, Whelan Overs: Canavan 3, Fallon 3, Giles 3, Kavanagh 3, Buckley, Dolan, Earley, Tohill
Best	AUS: Buckley, McRae, Cousins, Bell, Campbell, Smith; IRL: Kavanagh, Tohill, Fallon, Giles
Injuries	Nil
Venue	Melbourne Cricket Ground, Melbourne, VIC
Attendance	64,326
Umpires	Andrew Coates (Australia) Mick Curley (Ireland)

=== Second test ===
Team	1	2	3	4	Total
Australia	1.4.1	2.6.3	2.8.4	2.12.4	(52)
Ireland	1.1.4	1.4.8	1.7.11	1.11.13	(52)
Match was drawn	G.O.P	G.O.P	G.O.P	G.O.P	Final

Date	Friday, 15 October 1999
Scoring (AUS)	Goals: O'Loughlin, Crawford Overs: Buckley 5, Smith 2, Graham, Richardson, Waterhouse, Campbell, Bell
Scoring (IRL)	Goals: McDermott Overs: Fallon 2, Tohill 2, Buckley 2, Geraghty, Giles, Kavanagh, McManus, Stynes
Best	AUS: Buckley, Graham, Richardson, Crawford, Campbell, Akermanis; IRL: Donellan, Stynes, Giles, Fay, Cullen, Tohill
Injuries	Nil
Venue	Football Park, Adelaide, SA
Attendance	45,187
Umpires	Andrew Coates (Australia) Mick Curley (Ireland)

== See also ==
- International Rules football
- Gaelic football
- Australian rules football
- Comparison of Australian rules football and Gaelic football
