= South Leinster Senior Club Championship =

South Leinster Senior Club Championship is a championship for four club teams who have won the Senior League from Kildare, Laois, Wexford and Wicklow.

== Origin ==
The South Leinster Senior Club Championship is a club championship for four teams who have won the Senior League from Kildare, Laois, Wexford and Wicklow. The GAA founded the championship in 1990. It is held in the first week of June and finished on the third week. The final is held at Dr Cullen Park, Carlow.

== Winners ==
- 1990 - Portlaoise ( Portlaoise 1–15 to Naas's 2-10 )
- 1991 - Baltinglass ( Baltinglass 0–17 to Clane's 1-13 )
- 1992 - Baltinglass ( Baltinglass 2–14 to Ballyroan's 0-16 )
- 1993 - Sarsfields ( Sarsfields 3–10 to Kilanerin–Ballyfad's 0-17 )
- 1994 - Duffry Rovers ( Duffy Rovers 0–16 to Baltinglass's 1-11 )
- 1995 - Portarlington ( Portarlington 0–14 to Clane's 0-13 )
- 1996 - Round Towers ( Round Towers 3–18 to Rathnew's 1-15 )
- 1997 - Clane ( Clane 1–17 to Kilanerin–Ballyfad's 0-15 )
- 1998 - Rathnew ( Rathnew 3–15 to Stradbally's 0-10 )
- 1999 - Kilanerin–Ballyfad (Kilanerin–Ballyfad 0–12 to Sarsfields's 1-08 )
- 2000 - St Joseph's ( St Joseph's 1–14 to Moorefield's 0-14 )
