= Brian Malone =

Irish Gaelic footballer and hurler

Personal information
- Native name: Briain Mael Eòin (Irish)
- Born: 2 May 1986 (age 40) Shelmalier, County Wexford
- Occupation: Teacher

Sport
- Sport: Gaelic football
- Position: Left corner-back
Club
- Years: Club
- ?–: Shelmaliers
Inter-county
Years	County	Apps (scores)
2006–2021	Wexford	174

Brian Malone (born 2 May 1986) is the former captain of the Wexford senior football team. He made his debut against Monaghan in a 2006 All-Ireland SFC qualifier.

Malone formerly held the record for most senior appearances for Wexford with 174. In March 2024, Ben Brosnan made a record-equalling 174th appearance for Wexford, bringing him level with Malone.

Malone has also represented Wexford in senior hurling. He won a Leinster and All-Ireland IHC medal in 2007.

Malone trained as a teacher at Mater Dei Institute of Education in Dublin. He previously taught at Blackrock College, and currently teaches at St Peter's College, Wexford.
