= 2018 Wexford Senior Football Championship =

Wexford S.F.C.
- Season: 2018
- Champions: Shelmaliers (1st S.F.C. Title)
- Relegated: Taghmon–Camross
- All Ireland SCFC: n/a

The 2018 Wexford Senior Football Championship is the 120th edition of the Wexford GAA's premier club Gaelic football tournament for senior graded teams in County Wexford, Ireland. The tournament consists of 12 teams, with the winner going on to represent Wexford in the Leinster Senior Club Football Championship. The championship starts with a group stage and then progresses to a knock out stage.

Starlights were the defending champions after they defeated St Martin's in the previous years final.

This was Kilanerin–Ballyfad's return to the senior grade after claiming the 2017 Wexford I.F.C. title. This was their first year back in the top-flight of Wexford club football in 3 years since relegation at the end of the 2014 season.

On 20 October 2018, Shelmaliers claimed their first ever Wexford S.F.C. crown when defeating newly promoted Kilanerin–Ballyfad by 4–14 to 1–7 in the final after a replay at Wexford Park.

Taghmon–Camross were relegated to the 2019 I.F.C. after losing their Relegation Final to Sarsfields. This ended their two-year stay in the senior ranks.

The draws for the 2018 Wexford S.F.C. were made on 3 February 2018.

== Team changes ==
The following teams have changed division since the 2017 championship season.

=== To S.F.C. ===
Promoted from 2017 Wexford I.F.C.

- Kilanerin–Ballyfad - (Intermediate Champions)

=== From S.F.C. ===
Relegated to 2018 Wexford I.F.C.

- Horeswood

== Group stage ==
There are 2 groups called Group A and B. The top 4 in each group qualify for the quarter-finals. The bottom finisher in each group will qualify for the Relegation Final.

=== Group A ===
Team	Pld	W	L	D	PF	PA	PD	Pts
Kilanerin–Ballyfad	5	4	0	1	104	58	+46	9
St Martin's	5	4	1	0	83	50	+33	8
Castletown Liam Mellows	5	3	1	1	91	72	+19	7
St Anne's Rathangan	5	2	3	0	63	78	-15	4
St Mogue's Fethard	5	4	1	0	63	99	-36	2
Sarsfields	5	0	5	0	61	108	-47	0

Round 1

- Castletown 2-11, 0-15 St Anne's, 7/4/2018,
- Kilanerin–Ballyfad 2-14, 1-6 Sarsfields, 7/4/2018,
- St Martin's 1-10, 0-6 Fethard, 8/4/2018,

Round 2

- St Martin's 1-18, 1-8 Sarsfields, 13/4/2018,
- St Anne's 3-7, 0-12 Fethard, 14/4/2018,
- Kilanerin–Ballyfad 1–12, 2-9 Castletown, 14/4/2018,

Round 3

- St Anne's 1-11, 0-10 Sarsfields, 28/7/2018,
- Kilanerin–Ballyfad 2-11, 0-9 St Martin's, 18/8/2018,
- Castletown 1-12, 0-13 Fethard, 22/8/2018,

Round 4

- St Martin's 1-12, 0-10 Castletown, 10/8/2018,
- Kilanerin–Ballyfad 0-14, 0-12 St Anne's, 10/8/2018,
- Fethard 2-13, 3-8 Sarsfields, 12/8/2018,

Round 5

- Castletown 5-19, 1-11 Sarsfields, 1/9/2018,
- Kilanerin–Ballyfad 6-20, 1-10 Fethard, 1/9/2018,
- St Martin's 3-16, 0-6 St Anne's, 1/9/2018,

=== Group B ===
Team	Pld	W	L	D	PF	PA	PD	Pts
Shelmaliers	5	5	0	0	78	50	+28	10
Starlights	5	3	2	0	80	60	+20	6
Glynn–Barntown	5	2	3	0	78	72	+6	4
St James'	5	2	3	0	57	64	-7	4
Gusserane O'Rahilly's	5	2	3	0	62	82	-20	4
Taghmon–Camross	5	1	4	0	69	96	-30	2

Round 1

- Shelmaliers 1-12, 0-8 St James', 7/4/2018,
- Starlights 4-11, 2-9 Gusserane O'Rahilly's, 7/4/2018,
- Glynn–Barntown 5-11, 3-6 Taghmon–Camross, 8/4/2018,

Round 2

- Starlights 3-9, 0-8 Glynn–Barntown, 13/4/2018,
- Gusserane O'Rahillys 0-13, 0-12 St James', 14/4/2018,
- Shelmaliers 1-14, 2-8 Taghmon–Camross, 14/4/2018,

Round 3

- Starlights 3-15, 2-7 Taghmon–Camross, 17/8/2018,
- St James' 2-13, 2-9 Glynn–Barntown, 17/8/2018,
- Shelmaliers 1-13, 1-6 Gusserane O'Rahillys, 18/8/2018,

Round 4

- Shelmaliers 2-11, 0-9 Starlights, 11/8/2018,
- Glynn–Barntown 4-7, 0-7 Gusserane O'Rahillys, 11/8/2018,
- Taghmon–Camross 2-9, 1-8 St James', 12/8/2018,

Round 5

- Shelmaliers 1-10, 0-10 Glynn–Barntown, 31/8/2018,
- Gusserane O'Rahillys 3-9, 0-12 Taghmon–Camross, 31/8/2018,
- St James' 0-7, 0-6 Starlights, 31/8/2018,

== Relegation Final ==
The bottom finisher from both groups qualify for the Relegation final. The loser will be relegated to the 2019 Intermediate Championship.

- Sarsfields 4-9, 1-12 Taghmon–Camross, Cushinstown, 14/9/2018,

== Finals ==
The top 4 teams from each group qualify for the quarter-finals with 1st -vs- 4th and 2nd -vs- 3rd in each case.

=== Quarter-finals ===
- Starlights 2-12, 0-11 Castletown, Wexford Park, 6/9/2018,
- St Martin's 2-8, 1-7 Glynn–Barntown, Wexford Park, 6/9/2018,
- Kilanerin–Ballyfad 2-11, 2-6 St James', Wexford Park, 15/9/2018,
- Shelmaliers 2-10, 0-11 St Anne's, Wexford Park, 16/9/2018,

=== Semi-finals ===
- Kilanerin–Ballyfad 2-9, 0-14 St Martin's, Wexford Park, 30/9/2018,
- Shelmaliers 2-16, 0-12 Starlights, Wexford Park, 30/9/2018,

=== Final ===
- Shelmaliers 2–11, 2-11 Kilanerin–Ballyfad, Wexford Park, 14/10/2018,
- Shelmaliers 4-14, 1-7 Kilanerin–Ballyfad, Wexford Park, 21/10/2018, (Replay).
