= Mick Curley =

Gaelic football referee (born 1953 or 1954)

Personal information
- Born: 1953 or 1954 (age 71–72)
- Home town: Glinsk
- Occupation: Retired Garda Síochana superintendent
- Years active: c. 1990s–present
- Employer: GAA
- Other interests: National Referees' Association

Sport
- Sport: Gaelic football
- Position: Referee

Michael "Mick" Curley (born 1953 or 1954) is a former Gaelic football referee from County Galway.

== Career ==
Curley refereeing career peaked in the 1990s when he officiated the 1999 All-Ireland Senior Football Championship final, the only one between 1998 and 2001 not to involve his native Galway. He officiated Leinster SFC, Munster SFC and Ulster SFC finals, as well as three Connacht SFC finals. He quit refereeing in 2005, citing issues with knee cartilage as hampering his fitness.

He also officiated the 1998 and 1999 International Rules Series.

Following a 1999 National League game between Cavan and Wexford at Breffni Park, the Wexford manager Jo Jo Barrett assaulted Curley and received a two-year ban. Barrett approached Curley and punched him in the face.

As of 2010, Curley was chairman of the National Referees Committee. As of 2010, he was chairman of the National Referees Association, and, as of 2012, was manager of the Annaghdown minor football team. As well as his position with the National Referees' Committee, Curley has also worked as a Sports Co-ordinator with the County Sports Partnership, in an effort to promote sport in the region and to increase participation.

== Personal life ==
Curley is a native of Glinsk in the north of County Galway. He was recruited to the Garda Síochana in 1973, initially stationed at Stepaside, Dublin. Two and a half years later, he was transferred to Galway, where he spent most of the rest of his career, from Tynagh and Clifden to a spell in Rosmuc.

In 1996, he was made superintendent in Listowel, County Kerry. From there, he moved to Clifden before taking up the superintendent's position in Salthill, where he stayed until his retirement in December 2006.

As of 2005, he was a Garda superintendent based in Salthill.
