= Ger Halligan =

Football manager

Ger Halligan was a Gaelic football manager associated with the Wexford county team, who also served as a selector. He was attached to the Sarsfields club. He succeeded Jo Jo Barrett as Wexford manager in 1999.

Preceded by Jo Jo Barrett	Wexford Senior Football Manager; 1999–2002	Succeeded by Dom Twomey
