= 2017–18 All-Ireland Intermediate Club Football Championship =

Irish Gaelic football competition

Tournament details
- Year: 2018

Winners
- Champions: Moy

The 2017–2018 All-Ireland Intermediate Club Football Championship is the 15th annual gaelic football club championship since its establishment in the 2003-04 season. The winners of the intermediate club championship in each county enter the competition. Moy won the title.

The 2016-17 champions were Westport from Mayo who defeated St. Colmcille's of Meath on 19 February 2017 to win their 1st title.

== Format ==
County Championships

Ireland's 32 counties play their county championships between their intermediate gaelic football clubs. Each county decides the format for determining their county champions. The format can be straight knockout, double-elimination, a league or a combination.

Provincial Championships

Connacht, Leinster, Munster and Ulster each organise a provincial championship for their participating county champions. All matches are knock-out and two ten minute periods of extra time are played if it's a draw at the end of normal time.

All-Ireland

Two semi-finals are usually played on a Saturday in late January. The All-Ireland intermediate final is normally played in Croke Park in early February.

== County Finals ==
=== Connacht ===
Galway IFC

4 November 2017; 1:00 pm	Claregalway	1-12 - 0-12	Williamstown	Pearse Stadium, Salthill; Referee: Noel Dempsey; Man of the Match: Sean Moran
4 November 2017; 1:00 pm	Conor Kelly 1-2, Barry Goldrick (0-1f), Sean Moran (0-2f), Mark Rohan, Danny Cummins 0-2 each, Conor Campbell and Eoghan Commins 0-1 each	av	Gary Kelly 0-7 (0-4f), Kieran Flatley and John Smyth 0-2 each, Thomas Comer 0-1	Pearse Stadium, Salthill; Referee: Noel Dempsey; Man of the Match: Sean Moran

Leitrim IFC

8 October 2017; 1:30 pm	Aughnasheelin	0-12 - 0-10	Leitrim Gaels	Páirc Seán Mac Diarmada; Referee: Gareth Foley; Man of the Match: Conor Cullen
8 October 2017; 1:30 pm	Conor Cullen (1 '45), Fintan Fitzpatrick (0-3f), Gavin Sammon 0-3 each, Barry McWeeney (0-1f), Niall Mulvanerty, Brendan Mulvey 0-1 each	Report av av	Aidan Flynn 0-5, Eunan Tracey 0-3 (0-1f), Colm Moreton (0-1f) and Liam Moreton 0-1 each	Páirc Seán Mac Diarmada; Referee: Gareth Foley; Man of the Match: Conor Cullen

Mayo IFC

22 October 2017; 1:30 pm	Kiltimagh	2-11 - 1-14	Moy Davitts	McHale Park; Referee: Garryowen McMahon (Davitts); Man of the Match: Brian Reape
22 October 2017; 1:30 pm	Liam Lydon 1-1, David Lydon 1-0, Stephen McDonnell 0-3, Sean Walsh 0-2, Matthew Cummins, Cillian Finn, Sean Forkan, Ronan Malee (0-1f), Tomas Keegan 0-1 each		Brian Reape 1-7 (0-4f), Anthony Jordan (0-1f), Brian Heneghan, Liam Byrne 0-2 each, Oisin McHugh 0-1	McHale Park; Referee: Garryowen McMahon (Davitts); Man of the Match: Brian Reape

28 October 2017; 7:30 pm Replay	Moy Davitts	2-10 - 2-9	Kiltimagh	McHale Park; Referee: Kevin Connelly (Hollymount-Carramore); Man of the Match: James Mulderrig
28 October 2017; 7:30 pm Replay	Brian Reape 1-3 (0-1f), James Mulderrig 1-1, Mark Regan, Sean Mulroy, Padraig Ruane, Sean Kelly, Anthony Jordan, Brian Heneghan 0-1 each		Eoghan Lavin 1-3 (1-0 pen, 1 '45), David Lydon 1-0, Bryan Gallagher 0-2f, Ciaran Charlton, Liam Lydon, Ronan Malee (0-1f), Tomas Keegan 0-1 each	McHale Park; Referee: Kevin Connelly (Hollymount-Carramore); Man of the Match: James Mulderrig

Roscommon IFC

15 October 2017; 4:00 pm	Michael Glaveys	0-12 - 0-10	Fuerty	Dr. Hyde Park; Referee: Patrick McTiernan (St. Ronan's); Man of the Match: Conor Hussey
15 October 2017; 4:00 pm	Caoileann Fitzmaurice and Andy Glennon 0-3 each, Stephen Comer (0-2f) and Cathal Heneghan (0-2f) 0-2f each, Darren O'Malley (1 '45) and Tiernan Murphy 0-1 each		Niall Kilroy 0-6 (0-2f), Christy Leahy 0-2, Robbie Fallon and Gearoid Ennis (0-1f) 0-1 each	Dr. Hyde Park; Referee: Patrick McTiernan (St. Ronan's); Man of the Match: Conor Hussey

Sligo IFC

8 October 2017; 2:00 pm	St. John's	1-9 - 1-9	St. Farnan's	Markievicz Park; Referee: John Gilmartin (Curry)
8 October 2017; 2:00 pm	Ciaran O'Connor 0-4f, Stephen Mulligan 1-0, James Hynes 0-2, Eamonn Kilgannon, Paddy O'Connor (0-1f), Finnian Cawley 0-1 each	Report	Alan Keane 0-4 (0-3f), Fiachra Grennan 1-0, David Rooney and Tommy Kelly 0-2 each, Shane Stenson 0-1	Markievicz Park; Referee: John Gilmartin (Curry)

15 October 2017; 3:30 pm	St. John's	1-14 - 0-12	St. Farnan's	Markievicz Park; Referee: TJ Keaveney; Man of the Match: James Murphy
15 October 2017; 3:30 pm	Tommy Kelly 1-1, David Rooney (0-3f) and Alan Keane (0-3f) 0-4 each, Paul McNamara 0-2, Oisin Cox, Brian McGowan, James Murphy 0-1 each	Report	Paddy O'Connor 0-3, Martin Mulligan, James Hynes, Stephen Mulligan 0-2 each, Matt Lang, Ciaran O'Connor (0-1f), Mark Devaney 0-1 wach	Markievicz Park; Referee: TJ Keaveney; Man of the Match: James Murphy

=== Leinster ===
Carlow IFC

7 October 2017
6:30 pm

Kilbride	3-9 - 1-14	Grange
	av av

Dr. Cullen Park
Referee: John Hickey (Fenagh)

Dublin IFC

Ballyboughal, Garda, Naomh Fionnbarra and Trinity Gaels first teams all lost out to reserve sides at the Quarter-Final stages. Rules state that no reserve side can participate in a provincial competition so a play-off between these four sides took place. Ballyboughal defeated Naomh Fionnbarra in the final and hence qualified to represent Dublin in the Leinster Intermediate Club Football Championship.

17 November 2017; 3:15 pm	Na Fianna B	2-13 - 1-11	St Jude's B	Abbotstown; Referee: PJ Murray (St. Finian's Swords); Man of the Match: Sean Caffrey
17 November 2017; 3:15 pm	Sean Caffrey 1-4, Ciaran Hoolihan 1-2, Tom O’Connell 0-3f, Cathal Doran and Gareth Ryan 0-2 each	Report	Darren Gallagher 0-6 (0-4f), Tom Devlin 1-1, Joey Donnelly 0-2, Brendan Lynskey and Brendan McManamon 0-1 each	Abbotstown; Referee: PJ Murray (St. Finian's Swords); Man of the Match: Sean Caffrey

Kildare IFC

8 October 2017; 3:30 pm	Raheens	2-12 - 1-9	Kilcock	Newbridge; Referee: Brendan Cawley; Man of the Match: David Malone
8 October 2017; 3:30 pm	Paddy Woodgate 0-4 (0-3f), Colm Power and Rory Donnelly 1-0 each, David Malone 0-3, Alan Igoe 0-2f, Jason Early, Rory Hannick, Mark Waters 0-1 each	Report	Ciaran Murray 1-1, Shane O'Rourke 0-4 (0-2f), Daniel Courtney, Conor Caulfield, Fearghal O'Brien, Paul O'Brien 0-1 each	Newbridge; Referee: Brendan Cawley; Man of the Match: David Malone

Kilkenny SFC

The Kilkenny senior champions compete in the All-Ireland intermediate club championship.

26 August 2017	Mullinavat	3-12 – 2-5	Railyard	Nowlan Park; Referee: Conor Everard (Graigue-Ballycallan)
26 August 2017	Jamie Fennelly 2-2, John Walsh 1-2, Michael Malone and Ian Duggan 0-2 each, Ger Malone, Mark Mansfield, Joe Fennelly, Brian Phelan 0-1 each	Report	Caleb Roche 1-4, Colin Philips 1-0, Ronan Walsh 0-1	Nowlan Park; Referee: Conor Everard (Graigue-Ballycallan)

Laois IFC

30 September 2017; 7:15 pm	Emo	3-6 - 1-12	Portlaoise B	O'Moore Park; Referee: Joe Brennan (Crettyard); Man of the Match: Ronan McEvoy
30 September 2017; 7:15 pm	Evan Costello 1-4 (0-3f), Nigel Murphy and David Gorman 1-0 each, Darren Strong and Paul Lawlor 0-1 each	Report	Jason Maher 1-1, Ronan McEvoy and Craig Rogers (0-2f) 0-3 each, Jack Brown 0-2f, Ronan Molloy, Ross Brennan, Martin Staunton 0-1 each	O'Moore Park; Referee: Joe Brennan (Crettyard); Man of the Match: Ronan McEvoy

6 October 2017; 7:45 pm Replay	Emo	3-11 - 3-4	Portlaoise B	O'Moore Park; Referee: Seamus Mulhare (The Heath); Man of the Match: Paul Lawlor
6 October 2017; 7:45 pm Replay	Paul Lawlor 2-4 (0-2f), David Gorman 1-0, Evan Costello 0-2f, Padraig Kirwan, Niall Wheeler, Darren Strong, Nigel Murphy, Finbarr Crowley 0-1 each	Report	Oisin Fitzpatrick, Jason Maher, Shane McManus 1-0 each, Craig Rogers 0-2f, Jack Brown (0-1f) and Martin Staunton 0-1 each	O'Moore Park; Referee: Seamus Mulhare (The Heath); Man of the Match: Paul Lawlor

Longford IFC

24 September 2017; 4:00 pm	Rathcline	1-10 - 0-12	Sean Connollys	Pearse Park; Referee: Patrick Maguire (St Mary’s Granard); Man of the Match: Shane Donohue
24 September 2017; 4:00 pm	Shane Kenny 0-4 (1 '45), Ronan Clyne 1-1, James Hanley 0-3 (0-1f), Aaron Madden 0-2 (0-1f)	Report	Dessie Reynolds (0-3f) and Stephen Lynch (0-3f) 0-4 each, Joe Heaney 0-2, John McKenna and Trevor Murtagh 0-1 each	Pearse Park; Referee: Patrick Maguire (St Mary’s Granard); Man of the Match: Shane Donohue

Louth IFC

8 October 2017; 3:30 pm	O'Connells	1-11 - 0-8	Clan na Gael	Dunleer; Referee: Desmond McDonald (St. Nicholas); Man of the Match: Jackie Agnew
8 October 2017; 3:30 pm	Niall Conlon 0-5 (0-1f), Sean Connolly 1-0, Robert Quigley 0-3 (0-1f, 1 '45), Jackie Agnew 0-2, Dean Stanfield 0-1	Report	Billy Smith 0-4f, Conall McKeever, Mark Newell, Mark McGeown, Stephen Coleman 0-1 each	Dunleer; Referee: Desmond McDonald (St. Nicholas); Man of the Match: Jackie Agnew

Meath IFC

22 October 2017; 3:00 pm	Curraha	1-17 - 1-7	St. Michael's	Páirc Tailteann; Referee: Cormac Reilly (St. Mary's)
22 October 2017; 3:00 pm	Conor Moriarty (0-4f) and James McEntee (0-4f) 0-6 each, Andrew Battersby 1-1, Evan McGovern 0-2, Seamus Hogan and David Coyle 0-1 each	Report	Ciarán Lynch 1-3 (0-2f), Peter O'Connell and Oran Meehan (0-2f) 0-2 each	Páirc Tailteann; Referee: Cormac Reilly (St. Mary's)

Offaly Senior B

8 October 2017; 3:45 pm	Durrow	4-10 - 1-11	Bracknagh	O'Connor Park; Referee: Alan McKnight; Man of the Match: Jack Fogarty
8 October 2017; 3:45 pm	Jack Fogarty 4-0, Alan Geoghegan (0-2f) and Michael Mooney 0-3 each, Paul Kinnarney 0-2 (0-1f), Brian Geraghty and Paddy Murphy 0-1 each	Report av	Peter Cunningham 1-6 (0-5f), Robin Galbraith 0-2, Emmett Geoghegan (0-1f), Stefan Geoghegan, Edward Mather 0-1 each	O'Connor Park; Referee: Alan McKnight; Man of the Match: Jack Fogarty

Westmeath IFC

22 October 2017; 3:30 pm	Rochfortbridge	1-11 - 1-10	Shandonagh	Cusack Park; Attendance: 4,042; Referee: Michael McAdden (St. Loman's Mullingar); Man of the Match: Eoin Gorman
22 October 2017; 3:30 pm	Ian Keelan (0-1f) and Eoin Gorman (0-1f) 0-4 each, Paul Carey 1-0, Ned Cully 0-2, Colin Gavin 0-1f		Brian Kavanagh 0-5 (0-2f), Kevin Boyle 1-1, Alan Hickey, Jeremiah Scully, Tom Molloy, Martin Flanagan 0-1 each	Cusack Park; Attendance: 4,042; Referee: Michael McAdden (St. Loman's Mullingar); Man of the Match: Eoin Gorman

Wexford IFC

15 October 2017; 2:00 pm	Kilanerin–Ballyfad	3-13 - 3-11	HWH Bunclody	Wexford Park; Referee: Kevin Carty (Sarsfields)
15 October 2017; 2:00 pm	Matty Forde 1-4 (0-1f), Colm Kavanagh 1-2, Dean O'Toole 1-0, Niall Hughes, Mark Boland (0-1f), Bobby Hughes 0-2 each, Emmet O'Toole 0-1	Report av	Aidan Nolan 1-7 (0-6f), Peadair Cowman 1-1, Sean Kenny 1-0, Colm Farrell, Eoin Kelly, Peter Atkinson 0-1 each	Wexford Park; Referee: Kevin Carty (Sarsfields)

Wicklow IFC

7 October 2017; 4:00 pm	Hollywood	5-9 - 0-15	Dunlavin	Aughrim Park; Man of the Match: Mickey Healy
7 October 2017; 4:00 pm	Thomas Burke 3-0, Peader Traynor and Matthew Kelly 1-0 each, PJ O'Keefe and Tony Hannon (0-1f) 0-3 each, Mickey Healy, Cian Tyrell, Joe Glennon 0-1 each		Tom Davis 0-6 (0-5f), Cian O'Sullivan 0-4 (0-3f), James Walsh 0-2, Aaron Phelan, Gary Allen, Shane Carty 0-1 each	Aughrim Park; Man of the Match: Mickey Healy

=== Munster ===
Clare IFC

1 October 2017; 3:30 pm	Kilmihil	1-15 - 0-6	Kilrush Shamrocks	Miltown Malbay; Referee: Jim Hickey (Cratloe); Man of the Match: Mark Coughlan
1 October 2017; 3:30 pm	Declan Downes (0-5f) and Martin O'Leary (0-3f) 0-5 each, David Egan 1-0, Ciaran Downes 0-2, Jack Browne, Mark Coughlan, David Lernihan 0-1 each	av av	Gearoid O'Brien 0-4 (0-2f), Conor O'Brien and Liam Madigan 0-1 each	Miltown Malbay; Referee: Jim Hickey (Cratloe); Man of the Match: Mark Coughlan

Cork PIFC

15 October 2017; 2:00 pm	Mallow	1-17 - 1-16	St Michael's	Pairc Ui Chaoimh; Referee: David Murnane (Macroom)
15 October 2017; 2:00 pm	Cian O'Riordan 0-7 (0-3f), Aaron Sheehan 1-0, James Loughrey, Matthew Taylor, Kieran O'Sullivan 0-2 each, Michael Quirke, Conor Stokes, Ryan Harkin, Pa Herlihy 0-1 each	Report av av	Paul Cronin 0-6 (0-5f), Shane O'Keefe 1-0, Eric Hegarty 0-3 (0-1f), Niall Cashman and Liam O'Sullivan 0-2 each, Daniel Meaney, Domhnall Cremin, Keith Hegarty 0-1 each	Pairc Ui Chaoimh; Referee: David Murnane (Macroom)

Kerry IFC

29 October 2017; 3:00 pm	An Ghaeltacht	1-12 - 0-14	Templenoe	Austin Stack Park; Referee: James O'Sullivan (Firies); Man of the Match: Pádraig Óg Ó Sé
29 October 2017; 3:00 pm	Sean Micheál Ó Conchúir 1-3 (0-2f), Dara Ó Sé 0-5 (0-4f), PJ Mac Láimh 0-3, Gearóid Mac an tSaoir 0-1	Report av	Killian Spillane 0-6 (0-4f), Teddy Doyle, Stephen O'Sullivan, Cian Halissey (0-1f) 0-2 each, Tadhg Morley and Pat Spillane Jr. 0-1 each	Austin Stack Park; Referee: James O'Sullivan (Firies); Man of the Match: Pádraig Óg Ó Sé

Limerick IFC

6 October 2017; 8:15 pm	St. Senan's	4-9 - 2-8	Galbally	Rathkeale; Referee: Trevor Mann (Ballybrown)
6 October 2017; 8:15 pm	Richard Hayes 0-5 (0-2f), Darren Kavanagh and Conor Mullane 1-1, Ger Hanlon and Dale Fitzgerlad 1-0 each, Ollie Wallace and James Naughton 0-1 each		Gary McCarthy 1-5 (0-3f), Kieran Hickey 1-0, Eoin Burke, Jack Donovan, Nathan O'Byrne 0-1 each	Rathkeale; Referee: Trevor Mann (Ballybrown)

Tipperary IFC

15 October 2017; 12:00 pm	Kiladangan	1-11 - 1-7	Clonmel Óg	Drombane; Referee: Jonathan Cullen (Loughmore/Castleiney); Man of the Match: Joe Gallagher
15 October 2017; 12:00 pm	Darragh Egan 0-5 (0-4f), David Sweeney 1-1, Willie Connors and Dan O'Meara 0-2 each, Darren Moran 0-1	Report	Graham Quinn 1-1, Connor Arrigan 0-3, Johnny Cagney 0-2 (0-1f), Darragh Kearney 0-1	Drombane; Referee: Jonathan Cullen (Loughmore/Castleiney); Man of the Match: Joe Gallagher

Waterford IFC

27 October 2017; 8:00 pm	Dungarvan	1-9 - 0-8	St. Saviours	Fraher Field; Referee: Pat Casey (Affane); Man of the Match: Gavin Crotty
27 October 2017; 8:00 pm	Gavin Crotty 0-5f, Ryan Donnolly 1-1, Gavin Power, Joe Allen, Patrick Curran 0-1 each		Garreth Duffy 0-4, Darragh Corcoran 0-3 (0-1f), Shaun Corcoran 0-1f	Fraher Field; Referee: Pat Casey (Affane); Man of the Match: Gavin Crotty

=== Ulster ===
Antrim IFC

14 October 2017; 3:15 pm	St Brigids Belfast	1-13 - 0-8	Dunloy	Ahoghill; Referee: Paul McKeever (Portglenone)
14 October 2017; 3:15 pm	Ronan McGrady 0-6 (0-3f, 2 '45), Peter Webb 0-3, Ben Leonard 1-0, Ruaridh O'Neill 0-2, Cathal Conway and Jack Dowling 0-1 each	Report	Keelan Molloy 0-4 (0-2f), Conor McKinley 0-2 (0-1f), Nigel Elliott and Conal Cunning 0-1 each	Ahoghill; Referee: Paul McKeever (Portglenone)

Armagh IFC

15 October 2017; 3:00 pm	Killeavy	1-13 - 0-11	Silverbridge	Athletic Grounds; Referee: Jake Magill
15 October 2017; 3:00 pm	Raymond Teggart 1-3 (0-2f), Conor O'Neill 0-4 (0-3f), Ronan McGuinness 0-2, Ciaron O'Hanlon, Kyle Mallon, Michael Murphy, Cathal Boylan 0-1 each	Report	Ronan Reel 0-4 (0-2f, 1 '45), Peter Carragher (0-2f) and Damian McCann 0-2 each, Joe Rock, Jarly Og Burns, Eugene Byrne 0-1 each	Athletic Grounds; Referee: Jake Magill

Cavan IFC

1 October 2017; 4:00 pm	Shercock	2-11 - 1-9	Ballyhaise	Breffni Park; Referee: Chris McCaffrey (Templeport); Man of the Match: Niall Clerkin
1 October 2017; 4:00 pm	Niall Clerkin 1-2, Lee Clarke 1-1, Killian Clarke 0-4 (0-2f), Damien McIntyre 0-2, Dean O'Reilly and John McEnroe 0-1 each	Report	Kevin Tierney 0-7f, Colm Reilly 1-0, Martin Conaty 0-2f	Breffni Park; Referee: Chris McCaffrey (Templeport); Man of the Match: Niall Clerkin

Derry IFC

23 September 2017; 5:00 pm	Newbridge	1-9 - 1-4	Faughanvale	Celtic Park; Referee: Barry Cassidy (Bellaghy); Man of the Match: Kevin Sweeney
23 September 2017; 5:00 pm	Kevin Sweeney 1-1, Michael Bateson and Eamon Burke 0-2 each, Caolan McGrogan, Ciaran Brooks, Conor Doherty (0-1f), Danny Mulholland (0-1f) 0-1 each	Report	Eoin McElhinney 1-0, Eunan Murray 0-2f, Shaun Cassidy and Paddy O'Kane 0-1 each	Celtic Park; Referee: Barry Cassidy (Bellaghy); Man of the Match: Kevin Sweeney

Donegal IFC

8 October 2017; 2:30 pm	Milford	2-11 - 0-12	St. Naul's	O'Donnell Park; Referee: James Connors (St. Eunan's); Man of the Match: Gary Merritt
8 October 2017; 2:30 pm	Cathal McGettigan 1-2 (0-2f), Darragh Black 1-1, Luke Barrett 0-3f, Christopher Barrett 0-2, Gary Merritt, Pauric Curley, Kane Barrett 0-1 each	Report	Peadar Mogan 0-5 (0-4f), Stephen Griffin 0-4f, Stewart Johnston 0-2, Gavin Mulreany 0-1f	O'Donnell Park; Referee: James Connors (St. Eunan's); Man of the Match: Gary Merritt

Down IFC

8 October 2017; 4:00 pm	Rostrevor	1-10 - 1-6	Annaclone	Páirc Esler; Referee: Gavin Finnegan; Man of the Match: Piaras Kane
8 October 2017; 4:00 pm	Brian Keenan 1-0, Conor Fegan 0-3 (0-1f), Caolan Mooney and Piaras Kane 0-2, Connall Gordon, Damien Magee, Peter Magee 0-1 each	av	Colm Farrell 1-1, James Fegan 0-2 (0-1f), S O'Hare, Thomas Pyers, Kevin Anderson (0-1f) 0-1 each	Páirc Esler; Referee: Gavin Finnegan; Man of the Match: Piaras Kane

Fermanagh IFC

23 September 2017; 7:30 pm	Belcoo	2-9 - 1-11	Lisnaskea	Brewster Park
23 September 2017; 7:30 pm	Paul McGrath 1-1 (0-1f), Johnny Feely 0-4 (0-1f), Brian Cox 1-0, Ryan Leonard, James McGrath (0-1f), Shane McCabe, Aaron Dolan 0-1 each	av av	Daniel Kille 1-6 (0-5f), Niall McElroy 0-2, Kevin Smith, Adam McKenna, Chris McCabe 0-1 each	Brewster Park

Monaghan IFC

8 October 2017; 3:30 pm	Carrickmacross	3-12 - 1-8	Aughnamullen	Inniskeen; Referee: Stephen Hagan (Seán McDermotts); Man of the Match: Stephen O'Hanlon
8 October 2017; 3:30 pm	Stephen O'Hanlon 2-4, Peter O'Hanlon 1-1, Stephen Gollogly (0-2f) and Kevin O'Hanlon 0-3 each, Niall Loughman 0-1	Report av av	Micheál Bannigan 1-3, Kevin Sheridan and Colin Clerkin 0-2 each, Eddie McArdle 0-1f	Inniskeen; Referee: Stephen Hagan (Seán McDermotts); Man of the Match: Stephen O'Hanlon

Tyrone IFC

8 October 2017; 4:15 pm Final	Moy	2-5 - 1-7	Derrylaughan	Carrickmore; Referee: Brian McCallion (Castlederg); Man of the Match: Colm Cavanagh
8 October 2017; 4:15 pm Final	Harry Loughran 2-1, Sean Cavanagh 0-2f, Colm Cavanagh and Ryan Coleman 0-1 each	av av	Ciaran Quinn 1-1, Patrick Quinn (0-1f) and Fergal McAliskey (0-2f) 0-2 each, Tomas Carney and Ciaran Gervin 0-1 each	Carrickmore; Referee: Brian McCallion (Castlederg); Man of the Match: Colm Cavanagh

== Provincial championships ==
=== Connacht Intermediate Club Football Championship ===
==== Connacht Quarter-Final ====
21 October 2017; 2:30 pm	St. John's	3-12 - 0-3	Aughnasheelin	Connacht GAA Centre; Referee: Garryowen McMahon (Davitts); Man of the Match: Alan Keane
21 October 2017; 2:30 pm	Alan Keane 1-5 (0-2f, 1 '45), David Rooney (0-2f) and Brian McGowan 0-3 each, Conor Greene and Cathal Jordan 1-0, Paul McNamara 0-1	Report	Barry McWeeny 0-3f	Connacht GAA Centre; Referee: Garryowen McMahon (Davitts); Man of the Match: Alan Keane

==== Connacht Semi-Finals ====
5 November 2017; 2:30 pm	Michael Glaveys	0-19 - 1-15	Moy Davitts	McHale Park; Referee: Barry Judge (Castleconnor); Man of the Match: Andy Glennon
5 November 2017; 2:30 pm	Andy Glennon 0-8 (0-5f), Stephen Comer 0-3 (0-2f), Conor Hussey, Caoileann Fitzaurice, Cathal Heneghan 0-2 each, Darren O'Malley (1 '45) and Sean Burke 0-1 each	av av	Brian Reape 1-8 (0-6f), Alan Bourke 0-2, Mark Regan, James Mulderrig, Padraig Ruane, Brian Heneghan, Liam Byrne 0-1 each	McHale Park; Referee: Barry Judge (Castleconnor); Man of the Match: Andy Glennon

5 November 2017; 2:00 pm	Claregalway	1-12 - 1-10	St. John's	Markievicz Park; Referee: Liam Devenney (Ballina); Man of the Match: Barry Goldrick
5 November 2017; 2:00 pm	Danny Cummins 1-2, Barry Goldrick 0-4 (0-1f), Sean Moran (0-1f) and Mark Rohan 0-3 each	av	David Rooney 0-4 (0-2f), Brian McGowan 1-0, Alan Keane 0-3 (0-2f), Tommy Kelly 0-2, Robbie Fahy 0-1	Markievicz Park; Referee: Liam Devenney (Ballina); Man of the Match: Barry Goldrick

==== Connacht Final ====
19 November 2017
2:00 pm

Michael Glaveys	3-14 - 1-12	Claregalway

Dr. Hyde Park
Attendance: 2,000

=== Leinster Intermediate Club Football Championship ===
The Kilkenny senior football champions compete in the All-Ireland Intermediate Club Football Championship.

Preliminary Round
Rathcline (LD)	0-06
Kilanerin–Ballyfad (WX)	1-12
Durrow (OY)	2-17
Mullinavat (KK)	3-5
Emo (LS)	3-9
Hollywood (WW)	1-13
O'Connell's (LH)	2-10
Kilbride (CW)	1-8

Quarter-Finals
Kilanerin–Ballyfad	0-10
Raheens (KE)	0-8
Durrow	1-7
St. Mary's, Rochfortbridge (WH)	1-13
Emo	2-17 (AET)
Ballyboughal (DB)	3-14 (AET)
O'Connell's	0-12
Curraha (MH)	2-7

Semi-Finals
Kilanerin–Ballyfad	0-13
St. Mary's, Rochfortbridge	2-4
Ballyboughal	3-7
Curraha	0-15

Leinster Final
Kilanerin–Ballyfad	0-13
Ballyboughal/Curraha	0-11

==== Leinster Preliminary Round ====
21 October 2017; 2:00 pm	Rathcline	0-6 - 1-12	Kilanerin–Ballyfad	Lanesboro; Referee: David O'Connor (Naomh Mearnog)
21 October 2017; 2:00 pm		Report		Lanesboro; Referee: David O'Connor (Naomh Mearnog)

21 October 2017; 2:00 pm	O'Connells	2-10 - 1-8	Kilbride	Castlebellingham; Referee: Noel McKenna (Ballyteague)
21 October 2017; 2:00 pm		Report		Castlebellingham; Referee: Noel McKenna (Ballyteague)

22 October 2017; 2:00 pm	Durrow	2-17 - 3-5	Mullinavat	Durrow; Referee: Stephen Johnson (Glen Emmets)

28 October 2017; 1:00 pm	Hollywood	1-13 - 3-9	Emo	Hollywood; Referee: Fergal Barry (Monasterevin)

==== Leinster Quarter-Finals ====
4 November 2017; 2:00 pm	Kilanerin–Ballyfad	0-10 - 0-8	Raheens	Gorey; Referee: John Hickey (Fenagh); Man of the Match: Matty Forde
4 November 2017; 2:00 pm	Matty Forde 0-3 (0-2f), Niall Hughes 0-2 (0-1f), Colm Kavanagh, Niall Breen, Mark Boland (0-1f), Peter Hughes, Dean O'Toole 0-1 each	Report	David Malone 0-2, Rory Hannick, David Fitzpatrick, Alan Igoe (0-1f), Paddy Woodgate (0-1f), Liam Power, Rory Donnelly 0-1 each	Gorey; Referee: John Hickey (Fenagh); Man of the Match: Matty Forde

4 November 2017; 2:00 pm	Durrow	1-7 - 1-13	Rochfortbridge	Durrow; Referee: David Hickey (Fenagh); Man of the Match: Sean Lyster
4 November 2017; 2:00 pm	Jack Fogarty 1-1, Paul Kinnarney 0-3 (0-2f), Bobby O'Dea, Alan Geoghegan, Sean Duignan 0-1 each		Ian Keelan 1-5 (0-1f), Niall Cully 0-4 (0-3f), Ned Cully 0-2, Adam Kavanagh (1 '45) and Francis Duffy 0-1 each	Durrow; Referee: David Hickey (Fenagh); Man of the Match: Sean Lyster

4 November 2017; 2:00 pm	Emo	2-17 - 3-14 ((a.e.t.))	Ballyboughal	Emo; Referee: Chris Dwyer (Clara)
4 November 2017; 2:00 pm	Darren Strong 0-8 (0-1f, 1 '45), Paul Lawlor 1-4 (1-0 pen, 0-3f), Finbar Crowley 1-0, Evan Costello 0-2f, Niall Wheeler, Nigel Murphy, David Gorman 0-1 each	Report av av	Gerry Seaver 0-7 (0-4f), Richie Downey 2-0, Ben Callinan 1-1, Ciaran Wynne 0-3, Tony Rooney, Cormac Flynn, Jonathan Rooney 0-1 each	Emo; Referee: Chris Dwyer (Clara)

4 November 2017; 2:00 pm	Curraha	2-7 - 0-12	O'Connells	Castlebellingham; Referee: Seamus Mulhare (The Heath)
4 November 2017; 2:00 pm	Andrew Battersby 2-0, Conor Moriarty (0-2f) and James McEntee (0-2f) 0-3 each, Evan McGovern 0-1	Report	Robert Quigley 0-6 (0-3f), Niall Conlon 0-3 (0-2f), Dean Stanfield 0-2, Conor McGill 0-1	Castlebellingham; Referee: Seamus Mulhare (The Heath)

11 November 2017; 2:00 pm Replay	Ballyboughal	1-12 - 0-13	Emo	Ballyboughal; Referee: Patrick Maguire (St Mary’s Granard)
11 November 2017; 2:00 pm Replay	Gerry Seaver 0-8 (0-5f, 1 '45), Ciaran Wynne 1-1 (0-1f), Jonathan Rooney, John Rogers, Jamie Flynn 0-1 each	Report	Paul Lawlor (0-4f) and Evan Costello (0-2f) 0-4 each, Darren Strong (0-1f) and Finbar Crowley 0-2 each, David Gorman 0-1	Ballyboughal; Referee: Patrick Maguire (St Mary’s Granard)

==== Leinster Semi-Finals ====
11 November 2017; 2:00 pm	Kilanerin–Ballyfad	0-13 - 2-4	Rochfortbridge	Gorey; Referee: Noel McKenna (Ballyteague); Man of the Match: Matty Forde
11 November 2017; 2:00 pm	Matty Forde 0-9 (0-7f), Niall Hughes (1 '45), Dean O'Toole, Conor Devitt, Bobby Hughes 0-1 each	Report	Ian Keelan 1-2 (0-1f), Ned Cully 1-0, Niall Cully (0-1f) and Francis Duffy 0-1 each	Gorey; Referee: Noel McKenna (Ballyteague); Man of the Match: Matty Forde

18 November 2017; 2:00 pm	Ballyboughal	3-7 - 0-15	Curraha	Ballyboughal; Referee: Niall Ward (Garrycastle)
18 November 2017; 2:00 pm	Gerry Seaver 1-3 (0-2f, 1 '45), Ben Callinan and Jack Ryan 1-0 each, Cormac Flynn, Jonathan Rooney, John Rogers, Ciaran Wynne 0-1 each		Conor Moriarty 0-8 (0-4f), James McEntee 0-4 (0-1f), David Toner 0-3	Ballyboughal; Referee: Niall Ward (Garrycastle)

==== Leinster Final ====
25 November 2017
2:00 pm

Kilanerin–Ballyfad	0-13 - 0-11	Ballyboughal

Wexford Park
Referee: Chris Dwyer (Clara)

=== Munster Intermediate Club Football Championship ===
Quarter-Finals
Mallow (CK)	1-11
Dungarvan (WD)	0-11
St. Senan's (LK)	0-12
Kildangan	0-8

Semi-Finals
Mallow	1-8
An Gaeltacht	1-19
St. Senan's	2-11
Kilmihil (CE)	2-8

Munster Final
An Gaeltacht	3-21
St. Senan's	0-8

==== Munster Quarter-Finals ====
29 October 2017; 2:00 pm	Mallow	1-11 - 0-11	Dungarvan	Fraher Field; Referee: Richard Moloney (Bruff); Man of the Match: Gavin Crotty
29 October 2017; 2:00 pm	Ryan Harkin 1-2, Cian O'Riordan 0-5, Matty Taylor, Kieran O'Sullivan, Killian O'Connor, Sean Hayes 0-1 each	Report	Gavin Crotty 0-10f and Patrick Curran 0-1	Fraher Field; Referee: Richard Moloney (Bruff); Man of the Match: Gavin Crotty

5 November 2017; 2:00 pm	St. Senan's	0-12 - 0-8	Kiladangan	Toomevara; Referee: David Murnane (Macroom); Man of the Match: Ray Flaherty
5 November 2017; 2:00 pm	Ian Ryan (0-1f), Seamus McSweeney (0-1f), Richard Hayes (2 '45) 0-3 each, James Naughton, Conor Mullane, Andy Lane 0-1 each	Report	Fergal Hayes 0-2, Willie Connors, Joe Gallagher, Decky McGrath, Darragh Egan, Ben Banaghan, Billy Seymour 0-1 each	Toomevara; Referee: David Murnane (Macroom); Man of the Match: Ray Flaherty

==== Munster Semi-Finals ====
12 November 2017; 1:00 pm	An Ghaeltacht	1-19 - 1-8	Mallow	Mallow; Referee: Rory Hickey (Éire Óg)
12 November 2017; 1:00 pm	Sean Micheál Ó Conchúir 1-5 (0-2f), Dara Ó Sé 0-6 (0-5f), Sean Ó Gairbhí 0-2, Roibeard Ó Sé, Ciaran Ó Coileáin, PJ Mac Láimh, Tomas Ó Sé, Eanna Ó Conchúir, Cathal Mac Gerailt 0-1 each	Report av av	Killian O'Connor 1-2, Cian O'Riordan 0-4 (0-2f), Eoin Stanton and Ryan Harkin 0-1 each	Mallow; Referee: Rory Hickey (Éire Óg)

12 November 2017; 2:00 pm	St. Senan's	2-11 - 2-8	Kilmihil	Newcastlewest; Referee: Seamus Mulvihill (St Senans Kerry); Man of the Match: Anthony Russell
12 November 2017; 2:00 pm	Richard Hayes 0-5 (0-3f, 1 '45), Seamus McSweeney and Adam Kearns 1-0 each, Ollie Wallace and Stephen O'Connell 0-2 each, Ian Ryan (0-1f) and Andy Lane 0-1 each	av	David Egan 2-2, Declan Downes 0-2f, David Lenihan (1 '45), David Ryan, Sean Crowley, Martin O'Leary 0-1 each	Newcastlewest; Referee: Seamus Mulvihill (St Senans Kerry); Man of the Match: Anthony Russell

==== Munster Final ====
26 November 2017
2:00 pm

An Ghaeltacht	3-21 - 0-8	St. Senan's

Austin Stack Park
Referee: David Murnane (Macroom)

=== Ulster Intermediate Club Football Championship ===
Preliminary Round
Shercock	2-7
Newbridge	2-20

Quarter-Finals
Rostrevor	1-13
St Brigids Belfast	0-10
Milford	1-13
Killeavy	1-12
Moy	0-9
Carrickmacross	1-5
Newbridge	3-16
Belcoo	1-9

Semi-Finals
Rostrevor	0-13
Milford	0-12
Moy	2-15
Newbridge	1-9

Ulster Final
Rostrevor	0-8
Moy	0-9

==== Ulster Preliminary Round ====
15 October 2017; 2:30 pm	Shercock	2-7 - 2-20	Newbridge	Breffni Park; Referee: Padraig Hughes (Crossmaglen); Man of the Match: Ryan McElhone
15 October 2017; 2:30 pm	Killian Clarke 0-5 (0-2f), Declan McIntyre 1-1, Ryan Clerkin 1-0, Niall Clerkin 0-1	av av	Ryan McElhone 0-6 (0-4f), Eamon Burke and Mark McGrogan (0-1f) 1-2 each, Conor Doherty 0-3, Danny Mulholland 0-2, Michael Bateson, Padraig McGrogan, Kevin Sweeney (0-1f), Sean Patrick McCann, Ciaran Devlin 0-1 each	Breffni Park; Referee: Padraig Hughes (Crossmaglen); Man of the Match: Ryan McElhone

==== Ulster Quarter-Finals ====
28 October 2017; 5:15 pm	Newbridge	3-16 - 1-9	Belcoo	Celtic Park; Referee: Martin McNally (Corduff)
28 October 2017; 5:15 pm		av teamsheet teamsheet		Celtic Park; Referee: Martin McNally (Corduff)

29 October 2017; 2:30 pm	Milford	1-13 - 1-12	Killeavy	Athletic Grounds; Referee: Anthony Marron (Corduff)
29 October 2017; 2:30 pm		Report teamsheet		Athletic Grounds; Referee: Anthony Marron (Corduff)

29 October 2017; 2:30 pm	St Brigids Belfast	0-10 - 1-13	Rostrevor	Corrigan Park; Referee: Niall McKenna (Emyvale)
29 October 2017; 2:30 pm		av teamsheet		Corrigan Park; Referee: Niall McKenna (Emyvale)

29 October 2017; 2:30 pm	Moy	0-9 - 1-5	Carrickmacross	Healy Park, Omagh; Referee: Ronan Barry (Tullylish)
29 October 2017; 2:30 pm		av teamsheet teamsheet		Healy Park, Omagh; Referee: Ronan Barry (Tullylish)

==== Ulster Semi-Finals ====
12 November 2017; 12:45 pm	Moy	2-15 - 1-9	Newbridge	Athletic Grounds; Referee: Joe McQuillan (Kill Shamrocks); Man of the Match: Harry Loughran
12 November 2017; 12:45 pm	Harry Loughran 2-2, Sean Cavanagh 0-7 (0-6f), Declan Conroy 0-2, Eunan Deeney, Mark Gribbin, Patrick Lavery, Conall Duffy 0-1 each	tap av av	Michael Bateson 1-1, Conor Doherty 0-3 (1 '45), Danny Mullholland 0-2 (0-1f), Ciaran Brooks, Eamonn Burke, Mark McGrogan 0-1 each	Athletic Grounds; Referee: Joe McQuillan (Kill Shamrocks); Man of the Match: Harry Loughran

12 November 2017; 2:30 pm	Rostrevor	0-13 - 0-12	Milford	Athletic Grounds; Referee: Niall Cullen (Erne Gaels)
12 November 2017; 2:30 pm	Conor Doyle 0-4 (0-3f), Caolan Mooney 0-3 (0-1f), Conor Magee and Shaun Parr 0-2 each, Joe Morgan and Piaras Kane 0-1 each	av av	Luke Barrett 0-5f, Cathal McGettigan 0-4 (0-3f), Gary Merritt, Christopher Barrett, Tony McNamee 0-1 each	Athletic Grounds; Referee: Niall Cullen (Erne Gaels)

==== Ulster Final ====
26 November 2017
1:00 pm

Moy	0-9 - 0-8	Rostrevor

Athletic Grounds
Referee: Niall McKenna (Emyvale)

== All-Ireland ==
=== All-Ireland Bracket ===
Semi-Finals
Michael Glaveys (Roscommon)	0-13
Kilanerin–Ballyfad (Wexford)	0-11
Moy (Tyrone)	1-05
An Ghaeltacht (Kerry)	0-06

Final
Michael Glaveys (Roscommon)	0-7
Moy (Tyrone)	1-10

=== All-Ireland Semi-Finals ===
27 January 2018
2:00pm
Semi-Final

Michael Glaveys (Roscommon)	0-13 – 0-11	Kilanerin–Ballyfad (Wexford)

Bord Na Móna O’Connor Park, Tullamore
Referee: Paul Faloon (Down)

TG4

27 January 2018
2:00pm
Semi-Final

Moy (Tyrone)	1-05 – 0-06	An Ghaeltacht (Kerry)

O'Moore Park, Portlaoise
Referee: John Hickey (Carlow)

=== All-Ireland final ===
TG4 on Youtube

3 February 2018
3:45pm
Final

Moy(Tyrone)	v	Michael Glaveys (Roscommon)
(HT: 1-5 0-1)
Gls: 1 Pts: 10		Gls: 0 Pts: 7

Croke Park, Dublin
Referee: Brendan Cawley (Kildare)
