= Killinierin =

Village in County Wexford, Ireland

Kilanerin Irish: Coill an Iarainn
- Village
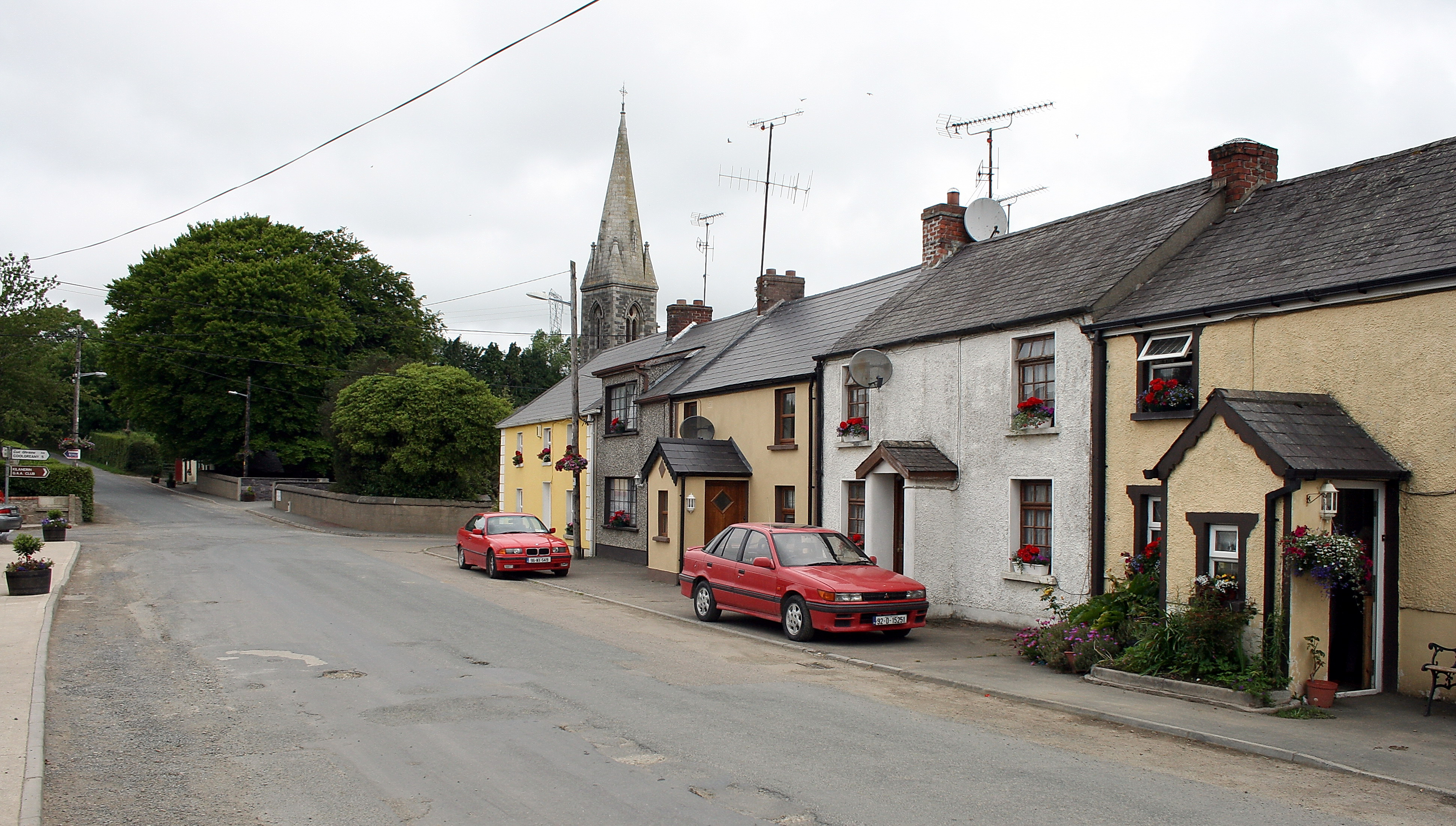
- Houses and church steeple in Kilanerin

- Location in Ireland
- Coordinates: 52°43′48″N 6°17′06″W
- Country: Ireland
- Province: Leinster
- County: County Wexford
- Elevation: 48 m (157 ft)

Population (2016)
  - Total: 244
- Time zone: UTC+0 (WET)
  - Summer (DST): UTC-1 (IST (WEST))

Kilanerin or Killinierin (Irish: Coill an Iarainn, meaning 'forest of iron') is a village in north County Wexford, Ireland, 4 kilometres west of the N11 road, near the village of Inch and approximately 12 kilometres from the town of Gorey.

It lies in the foothills of Croghan Mountain, the site of a once-famous gold rush.

== History and architecture ==
The Roman Catholic church in the village, St. Peter and Paul's Church, is a Gothic style structure which was built in 1863. The architects were E. W. Pugin and George Ashlin. The Esmonde family of Ballynastragh were major benefactors of the church, and are listed together with other benefactors on a plaque inside the church.

Borleigh Manor is a Georgian residence on 160 acres (0.65 km^{2}) of land. It is the former residence of Richard Greene the film star who is best known for his portrayal of Robin Hood. Among the film stars to have spent some time there were Liz Taylor and Richard Burton.

Ballynastragh House was the home of the Esmonde family and dates back to the 17th century. It was burned down and destroyed by members of the anti-Treaty IRA on 9 March 1923. It was home to a museum, and the destruction of the documents within it was a loss second only to that which occurred in the Four Courts in 1922. A new house, similar in style, was built on the site in the 1930s and still exists today. Titania's Palace was for a period kept in Ballynastragh House.

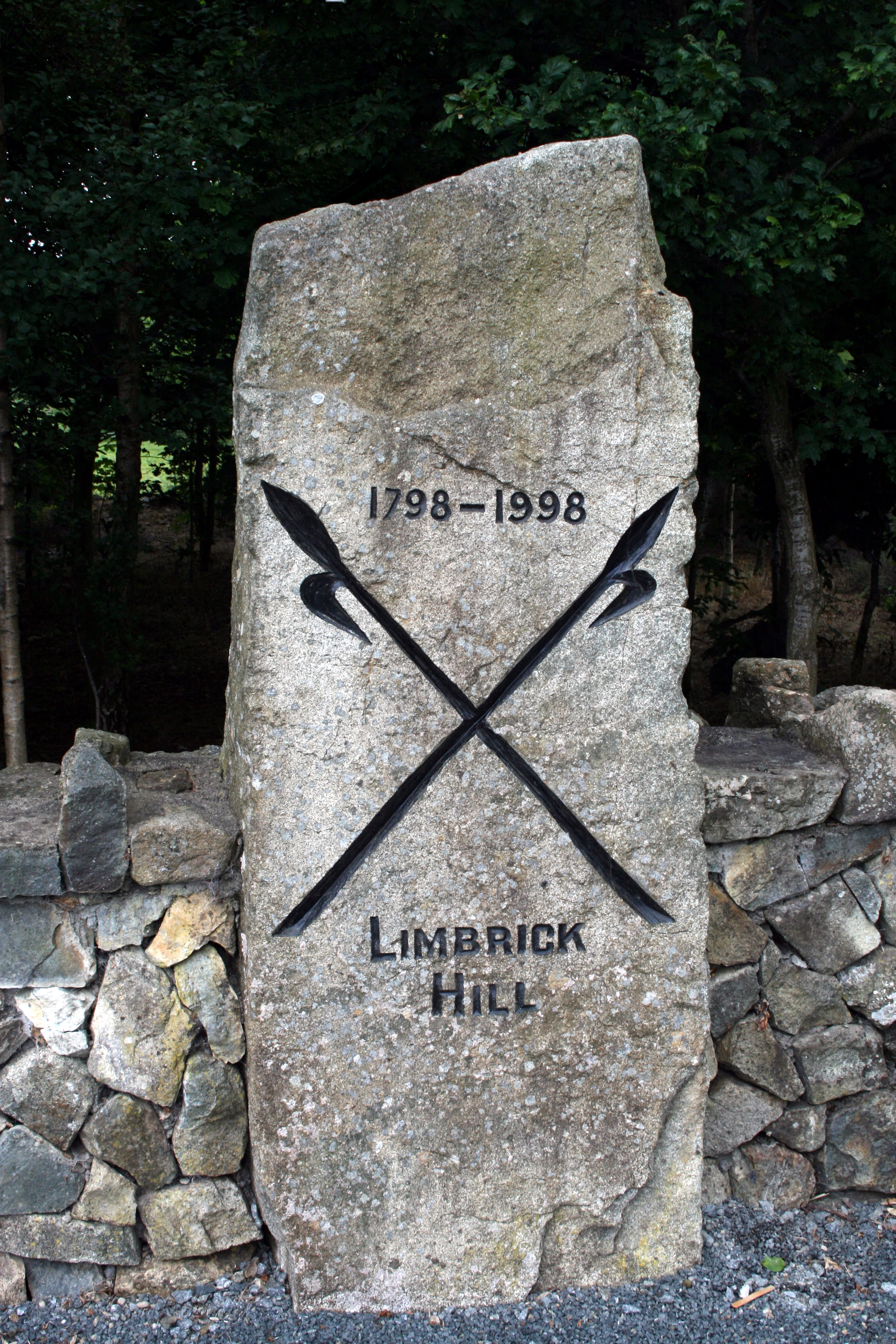
Memorial to the 1798 Rebellion at Limbrick Hill, Kilanerin

== Sport ==
The local Gaelic Athletic Association club is known as Kilanerin–Ballyfad GAA. It joins with other small villages such as Ballyfad, Ballythomas and Annagh to form the GAA team. The club competes at various levels in the underage and adult categories within Wexford GAA. The adult team compete in the Wexford Senior Football Championship which they last won in 2008. They also previously competed in the Wexford Senior Hurling Championship until their relegation to the Intermediate Championship.

Former All-Star Mattie Forde is a player with the club. Other former players include Wexford TD Michael W. D'Arcy.

== See also ==
- List of towns and villages in Ireland
