= Michael W. D'Arcy =

Irish former politician (born 1970)

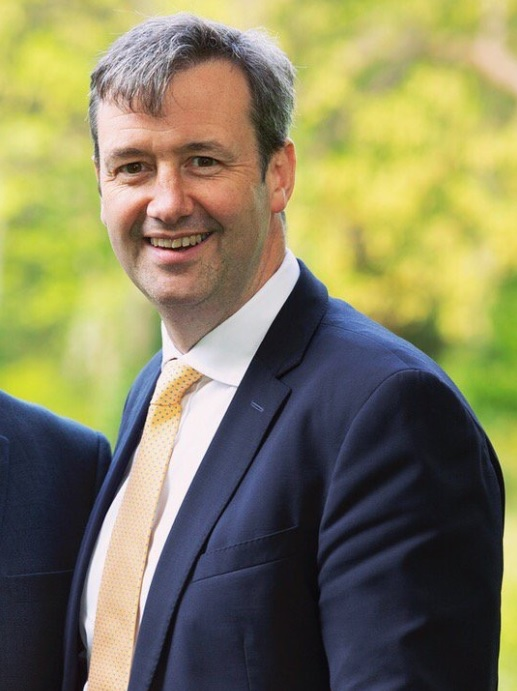
- D'Arcy in 2019

Senator
- In office 29 June 2020 – 28 September 2020
- Constituency: Agricultural Panel
- In office 25 May 2011 – 30 February 2016
- Constituency: Administrative Panel

Minister of State
- 2017–2020: Finance

Teachta Dála
- In office February 2016 – February 2020
- In office May 2007 – February 2011
- Constituency: Wexford

Personal details
- Born: 26 February 1970 (age 56) Gorey, County Wexford, Ireland
- Party: Fine Gael
- Children: 2
- Parent: Michael D'Arcy (father)
- Education: University College Cork

Michael William D'Arcy (born 26 February 1970) is the chief executive of the Irish Association of Investment Management. He is an Irish former Fine Gael politician who was elected to the Seanad for the Agricultural Panel in April 2020. He was a Teachta Dála (TD) for the Wexford constituency from 2016 to 2020, and previously between 2007 and 2011. He served as Minister of State at the Department of Finance from 2017 to 2020. He previously served as a Senator for the Administrative Panel from 2011 to 2016.

== Early and private life ==
D'Arcy was born in Gorey, County Wexford, in 1970. He is the son of Michael D'Arcy, TD and Minister of State, and the grandson of Timothy D'Arcy, a county councillor. D'Arcy was educated at Ballythomas National School, Gorey Community School and the University of London, where he studied law. In the past D'Arcy has been an active GAA player, winning an All-Ireland junior football title with Wexford in 1992, and five Wexford senior football titles with Killinierin. He also played youth soccer with Wexford. He is the current chairman of Kilanerin–Ballyfad GAA Club.

Before entering politics, D'Arcy worked as a teacher and a farmer, and continued to run a dairy farm in Annagh near Gorey while serving as a TD. He is married and has two children.

== Political career ==
D'Arcy first held political office in December 2003, when he was co-opted as a Wexford County Councillor for the Gorey area, to replace his father Michael who had to stand down when the Local Government Act 2001 abolished the dual mandate. He was re-elected at the 2004 local elections where he topped the poll.

During his time on Wexford County Council, D'Arcy held the position of the council's vice-chairman. He was also chairman of County Wexford Vocational Education Committee from 2004 to 2007 and a member of the board of management of Gorey Community School and Kilmuckridge Vocational College. He is a former director of Wexford County Enterprise Board and Wexford Organisation for Rural Development.

D'Arcy was first elected to Dáil Éireann at the 2007 general election. His father was previously a TD for the same constituency. He served as the party deputy spokesperson on justice, with special responsibility for Equality from 2007 to 2010, and was the deputy spokesperson on communications, energy and natural resources, with special responsibility for telecommunications from 2010 to 2011. During the 2007 to 2011 term, he served on the Oireachtas Committee on Communications, Energy and Natural Resources.

He lost his seat at the 2011 general election to party colleague Liam Twomey. He was subsequently elected to Seanad Éireann on the Administrative Panel in April 2011, whereupon he became the Fine Gael Seanad Spokesperson on Finance.

He was re-elected to Dáil Éireann for the Wexford constituency at the 2016 general election.

=== Oireachtas Banking Inquiry Committee ===
D'Arcy was a member of the Oireachtas Banking Inquiry Committee, which was a joint committee of the Houses of the Oireachtas. It was formally established in November 2014, to inquire into the reasons Ireland experienced a systemic banking crisis. Following completion of its investigation and public hearings, the committee published its final report on 27 January 2016.

=== Minister of State ===
D'Arcy was a supporter of Leo Varadkar in his successful leadership campaign. In June 2017, after Varadkar was appointed as Taoiseach, D'Arcy was appointed Minister of State at the Department of Finance and Public Expenditure and Reform, with special responsibility for Financial Services and Insurance. In late 2018, D'Arcy and Minister for Finance Paschal Donohoe welcomed Ireland's issuing of its first green bond, making Ireland one of the first countries in the world to do so. D'Arcy stated that: "Irish Sovereign Green Bonds will help to fund the green projects set out in the National Development Plan which contains €23 billion in direct Exchequer funding for eligible green projects over the next ten years."

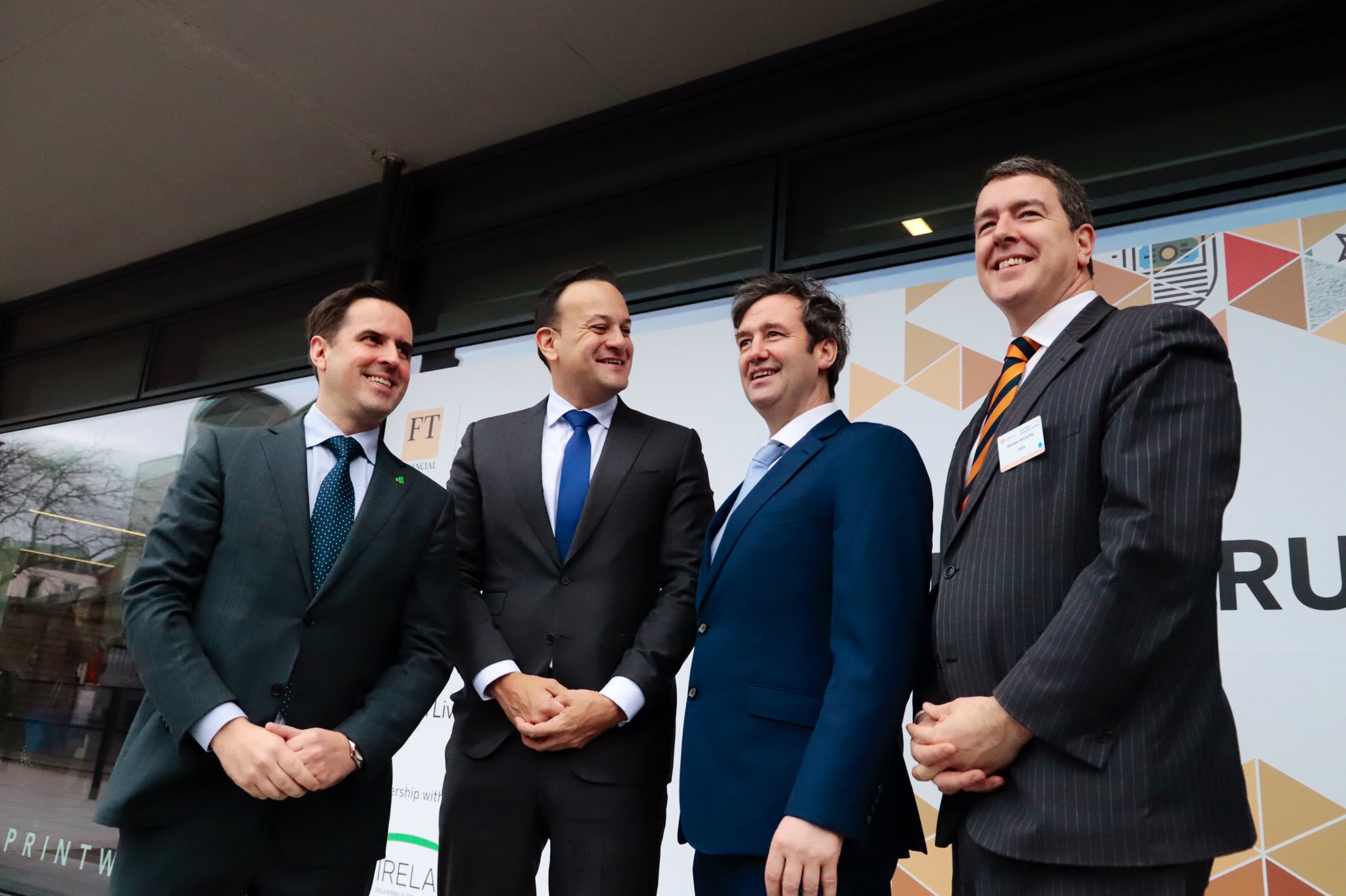
Michael W. D'Arcy pictured (second right) with Taoiseach Leo Varadkar (second left) and others at European Financial Forum 2019

On 26 April 2019, D'Arcy and Paschal Donohoe jointly launched Ireland for Finance, a strategy for the further development of the International Financial Services (IFS) sector in Ireland to 2025. The aim is for Ireland to be a top-tier global location of choice for specialist international financial services.

On 11 June 2019, the Government approved the publication of the Investment Limited Partnership (Amendment) Bill 2019. The aim of the bill was to make Ireland a more attractive domicile for private equity fund.

On 20 June 2019, D'Arcy welcomed the completion of Report and Final Stages of the Judicial Council Bill, as part of a series of reforms to reduce increasing insurance premiums in Ireland. The amendments provide for the establishment of a Personal Injuries Guidelines Committee whose sole function will be to develop the relevant personal injury guidelines for appropriate general damages for various types of personal injuries. D'Arcy has stated that bringing the levels of personal injury damages awarded in Ireland more in line with those awarded in other jurisdictions is the single most essential challenge which must be overcome if there is to be a sustainable reduction in insurance costs.

=== Senator ===
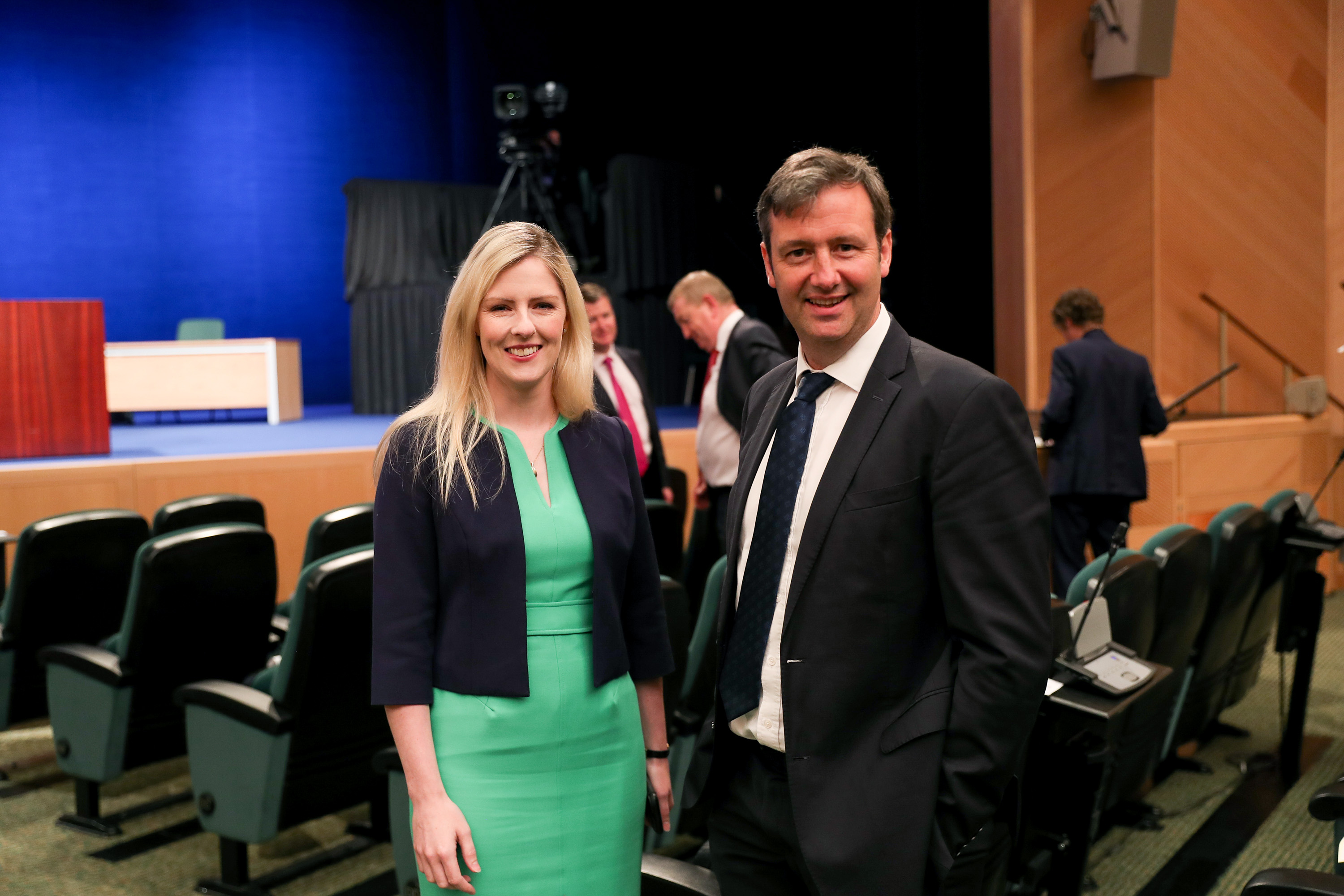
D'Arcy with Lisa Chambers in 2020

D'arcy lost his seat at the 2020 general election. He was elected to the Seanad in April 2020. In September 2020, he quit the Seanad to become chief executive of the Irish Association of Investment Management (IAIM).

His appointment was criticised by opposition politicians. Sinn Féin leader Mary Lou McDonald objected to a recent former minister being employed by an organisation that had lobbied him as a minister. Labour Party finance spokesperson Ged Nash said it was intolerable for the department of finance to become a "training ground for corporate careers in the financial services industry". Critics pointed to Standards in Public Office Commission (SIPO) regulations and section 22 of the Lobbying Act, which forbids a person in public office from lobbying for 12 months after leaving that office. IAIM responded that D'Arcy and the association "will not be engaging in any lobbying activities until the 12-month cooling off period has been completed, in adherence with the regulations".

== See also ==
- Families in the Oireachtas

Political offices
Preceded by Eoghan Murphy	Minister of State at the Department of Finance; 2017–2020	Succeeded by Jack Chambers

Dáil	Election	Deputy (Party)	Deputy (Party)	Deputy (Party)	Deputy (Party)	Deputy (Party)
2nd	1921	Richard Corish (SF)	James Ryan (SF)	Séamus Doyle (SF)	Seán Etchingham (SF)	4 seats 1921–1923
3rd	1922	Richard Corish (Lab)	Daniel O'Callaghan (Lab)	Séamus Doyle (AT-SF)	Michael Doyle (FP)	4 seats 1921–1923
4th	1923	Richard Corish (Lab)	James Ryan (Rep)	Robert Lambert (Rep)	Michael Doyle (FP)	Osmond Esmonde (CnaG)
5th	1927 (Jun)	Richard Corish (Lab)	James Ryan (FF)	James Shannon (Lab)	Michael Doyle (FP)	John Keating (NL)
6th	1927 (Sep)	Richard Corish (Lab)	James Ryan (FF)	Denis Allen (FF)	Michael Jordan (FP)	Osmond Esmonde (CnaG)
7th	1932	Richard Corish (Lab)	James Ryan (FF)	Denis Allen (FF)	John Keating (CnaG)	Osmond Esmonde (CnaG)
8th	1933	Richard Corish (Lab)	James Ryan (FF)	Patrick Kehoe (FF)	John Keating (CnaG)	Osmond Esmonde (CnaG)
8th	1936 by-election	Richard Corish (Lab)	James Ryan (FF)	Patrick Kehoe (FF)	John Keating (CnaG)	Denis Allen (FF)
9th	1937	Richard Corish (Lab)	James Ryan (FF)	John Keating (FG)	John Esmonde (FG)	Denis Allen (FF)
10th	1938	Richard Corish (Lab)	James Ryan (FF)	John Keating (FG)	John Esmonde (FG)	Denis Allen (FF)
11th	1943	Richard Corish (Lab)	James Ryan (FF)	John O'Leary (Lab)	John Esmonde (FG)	Denis Allen (FF)
12th	1944	Richard Corish (Lab)	James Ryan (FF)	John O'Leary (NLP)	John Keating (FG)	Denis Allen (FF)
12th	1945 by-election	Brendan Corish (Lab)	James Ryan (FF)	John O'Leary (NLP)	John Keating (FG)	Denis Allen (FF)
13th	1948	Brendan Corish (Lab)	James Ryan (FF)	John O'Leary (NLP)	John Esmonde (FG)	Denis Allen (FF)
14th	1951	Brendan Corish (Lab)	James Ryan (FF)	John O'Leary (Lab)	Anthony Esmonde (FG)	Denis Allen (FF)
15th	1954	Brendan Corish (Lab)	James Ryan (FF)	John O'Leary (Lab)	Anthony Esmonde (FG)	Denis Allen (FF)
16th	1957	Brendan Corish (Lab)	James Ryan (FF)	Seán Browne (FF)	Anthony Esmonde (FG)	Denis Allen (FF)
17th	1961	Brendan Corish (Lab)	James Ryan (FF)	Lorcan Allen (FF)	Anthony Esmonde (FG)	4 seats 1961–1981
18th	1965	Brendan Corish (Lab)	James Kennedy (FF)	Lorcan Allen (FF)	Anthony Esmonde (FG)	4 seats 1961–1981
19th	1969	Brendan Corish (Lab)	Seán Browne (FF)	Lorcan Allen (FF)	Anthony Esmonde (FG)	4 seats 1961–1981
20th	1973	Brendan Corish (Lab)	Seán Browne (FF)	Lorcan Allen (FF)	John Esmonde (FG)	4 seats 1961–1981
21st	1977	Brendan Corish (Lab)	Seán Browne (FF)	Lorcan Allen (FF)	Michael D'Arcy (FG)	4 seats 1961–1981
22nd	1981	Brendan Corish (Lab)	Ivan Yates (FG)	Lorcan Allen (FF)	Michael D'Arcy (FG)	Hugh Byrne (FF)
23rd	1982 (Feb)	Seán Browne (FF)	Ivan Yates (FG)	Lorcan Allen (FF)	Michael D'Arcy (FG)	Hugh Byrne (FF)
24th	1982 (Nov)	Avril Doyle (FG)	Ivan Yates (FG)	John Browne (FF)	Michael D'Arcy (FG)	Hugh Byrne (FF)
25th	1987	Avril Doyle (FG)	Ivan Yates (FG)	John Browne (FF)	Brendan Howlin (Lab)	Hugh Byrne (FF)
26th	1989	Michael D'Arcy (FG)	Ivan Yates (FG)	John Browne (FF)	Brendan Howlin (Lab)	Séamus Cullimore (FF)
27th	1992	Avril Doyle (FG)	Ivan Yates (FG)	John Browne (FF)	Brendan Howlin (Lab)	Hugh Byrne (FF)
28th	1997	Michael D'Arcy (FG)	Ivan Yates (FG)	John Browne (FF)	Brendan Howlin (Lab)	Hugh Byrne (FF)
29th	2002	Paul Kehoe (FG)	Liam Twomey (Ind.)	John Browne (FF)	Brendan Howlin (Lab)	Tony Dempsey (FF)
30th	2007	Paul Kehoe (FG)	Michael W. D'Arcy (FG)	John Browne (FF)	Brendan Howlin (Lab)	Seán Connick (FF)
31st	2011	Paul Kehoe (FG)	Liam Twomey (FG)	John Browne (FF)	Brendan Howlin (Lab)	Mick Wallace (Ind.)
32nd	2016	Paul Kehoe (FG)	Michael W. D'Arcy (FG)	James Browne (FF)	Brendan Howlin (Lab)	Mick Wallace (I4C)
32nd	2019 by-election	Paul Kehoe (FG)	Michael W. D'Arcy (FG)	James Browne (FF)	Brendan Howlin (Lab)	Malcolm Byrne (FF)
33rd	2020	Paul Kehoe (FG)	Verona Murphy (Ind.)	James Browne (FF)	Brendan Howlin (Lab)	Johnny Mythen (SF)
34th	2024	4 seats since 2024	Verona Murphy (Ind.)	James Browne (FF)	George Lawlor (Lab)	Johnny Mythen (SF)
