= 2011 Leinster Senior Football Championship =

The 2011 Leinster Senior Football Championship was that year's installment of the annual Leinster Senior Football Championship held under the auspices of the Leinster GAA. It was won by Dublin who defeated Wexford in the final. Dublin had been level with Kildare in injury time of their semi-final, but a late intervention by Cormac Reilly was enough to see them over the line by a point. Dublin won their 50th Leinster football title, and their sixth in seven years. Pundits lashed them for their lackadaisical approach and described it as having been won in "perhaps the most unconvincing fashion of the lot." Wexford had not won a Leinster football title since 1945.

Wexford entered the All-Ireland Qualifiers but lost their next game, to Limerick. The winning Dublin team received the Delaney Cup, and automatically advanced to the quarter-final stage of the 2011 All-Ireland Senior Football Championship. They went on to win the All-Ireland title, their first in a very very very long time.

== Bracket ==
Preliminary round
Kildare | 0-12
Wicklow | 0-5
Laois | 0-10
Longford | 0-9
Wexford | 2-16
Offaly | 0-8

Quarter-finals
Kildare | 0-16
Meath | 0-10
Laois | 0-11
Dublin | 1-16
Wexford | 1-24
Westmeath | 0-15
Carlow | 0-14
Louth | 0-13

Semi-finals
Kildare | 1-11
Dublin | 1-12
Wexford | 4-12
Carlow | 0-10

Final
Wexford | 1-12
Dublin | 2-12

== Preliminary round ==
22 May 2011
4:00pm
Preliminary round

| Kildare | 0-12 - 0-5 | Wicklow |
|---|---|---|
| J Doyle 0-4 (3f), A Smith 0-3, G White ('45), H Lynch, T O'Connor, E Bolton, P Fogarty 0-1 each | Report | A O'Malley, S Furlong (1f) 0-2 each, L Glynn 0-1 (f). |

O'Moore Park, Portlaoise
Attendance: 9,500
Referee: M Duffy (Sligo)
22 May 2011
2:00pm
Preliminary round

| Laois | 0-10 - 0-9 | Longford |
|---|---|---|
| D Carroll 0-4 (1f), B Sheehan, N Donoher 0-2 each, MJ Tierney, R Munnelly (f) 0-1 each | Report | S McCormack 0-6 (3f), B Kavanagh, M Brady, B McElvaney (f) 0-1 each. |

O'Moore Park, Portlaoise
Attendance: 9,500
Referee: David Coldrick (Meath)
28 May 2011
5:00pm
Preliminary round

| Wexford | 2-16 - 0-8 | Offaly |
|---|---|---|
| C Lyng 1-6 (4f), B Brosnan 0-7 (3f, 1 '45'), R Barry 1-0, R Quinlivan, P Byrne, A Morrissey 0-1 each. | Report | N McNamee 0-4, B Allen 0-2, N Dunne, K Casey 0-1 each. |

O'Connor Park, Tullamore
Attendance: 2,900
Referee: P O'Sullivan (Kerry)

== Quarter-finals ==
5 June 2011
2:00pm
Quarter-final

| Kildare | 0-16 - 0-10 | Meath |
|---|---|---|
| John Doyle (0-1f) and Eamonn Callaghan 0-4 each, Eoghan O'Flaherty 0-3 (0-1f, 1 '45), James Kavanagh 0-2, Alan Smith, Emmet Bolton, R Kelly 0-1 each | Report | Paddy O'Rourke (2 '45) and Shane O'Rourke (0-1f) 0-3 each, Joe Sheridan 0-2, Stephen Bray and Brian Farrell (0-1f) 0-1 each |

Croke Park, Dublin
Attendance: 41,786
Referee: S Doyle (Wexford)
5 June 2011
4:00pm
Quarter-final

| Laois | 0-11 - 1-16 | Dublin |
|---|---|---|
| Ross Munnelly 0-4 (0-2f), Padraig McMahon, Damien Carroll, Gary Kavanagh 0-2 each, Colm Begley 0-1 | Report | Diarmuid Connolly 1-3, Bernard Brogan 0-5 (0-2f), Stephen Cluxton (3 '45) and Alan Brogan 0-3 each, Bryan Cullen and Tomas Quinn (0-1f) 0-1 each |

Croke Park, Dublin
Attendance: 41,786
Referee: Joe McQuillan (Cavan)
11 June 2011
5:00pm
Quarter-final

| Wexford | 1-24 - 0-15 | Westmeath |
|---|---|---|
| C Lyng 0-10 (3f), B Brosnan 0-7 (5f), R Barry 1-3, A Flynn, R Quinlivan, S Roche, E Bradley 0-1 each. | Report | D Dolan 0-7 (2f), Denis Glennon 0-4, P Greville 0-2 (2f), A Finnan, J Heslin 0-1 each. |

Wexford Park, Wexford
Attendance: 13,900
Referee: P Hughes (Armagh)
12 June 2011
3:30pm
Quarter-final

| Carlow | 0-14 - 0-13 | Louth |
|---|---|---|
| D St Ledger 0-4 (3f); Brendan Murphy 0-3; Brian Murphy 0-2 (1f); D Foley 0-2 (2f); P Hickey, S Gannon, E Finnegan 0-1 each. | Report | S Lennon 0-6 (3f); P Keenan 0-2; D Reid, B Donnelly, D Maguire, D Crilly, R Carroll 0-1 each. |

O'Moore Park, Portlaoise
Attendance: 2,910
Referee: D Fahy (Longford)

== Semi-finals ==
| 26 June 2011; 2:00pm Semi-final | Wexford | 4-12 - 0-10 | Carlow | Croke Park, Dublin; Attendance: 58,723; Referee: M Collins (Cork); Man of the Match: Shane Roche (Geraldine O'Hanrahan's) |
| 26 June 2011; 2:00pm Semi-final | Shane Roche 2-4, Ben Brosnan 0-6 (0-2f, 3 '45), Eric Bradley 1-1, PJ Banville 1-0, Ciaran Lyng 0-1 | Report | Brian Murphy 0-3f, Brendan Murphy, Daniel St Ledger (0-1f), Cormac Mullins 0-2 each, Darragh Foley 0-1f | Croke Park, Dublin; Attendance: 58,723; Referee: M Collins (Cork); Man of the Match: Shane Roche (Geraldine O'Hanrahan's) |

| 26 June 2011; 4:00pm Semi-final | Dublin | 1-12 - 1-11 | Kildare | Croke Park, Dublin; Attendance: 58,723; Referee: Cormac Reilly (Meath); Man of the Match: Alan Brogan (St. OP/ER) |
| 26 June 2011; 4:00pm Semi-final | Bernard Brogan 0-6 (0-5f), Paul Flynn 1-1, Stephen Cluxton (0-1f, 1 '45) and Alan Brogan 0-2 each, Bryan Cullen 0-1 | Report | Eamonn Callaghan 1-2, Eoghan O'Flaherty 0-4 (0-1f), R Kelly 0-2, Emmet Bolton, John Doyle (0-1f), Ronan Sweeney 0-1 each | Croke Park, Dublin; Attendance: 58,723; Referee: Cormac Reilly (Meath); Man of the Match: Alan Brogan (St. OP/ER) |

== Final ==
10 July 2011
2:00pm
Final

| Wexford | 1-12 - 2-12 | Dublin |
|---|---|---|
| B Brosnan 0-9 (4f, 2 '45), R Barry 1-0, C Lyng 0-2, A Flynn 0-1 | Report | J McCarthy 1-0, A Brogan, B Brogan (1f) 0-3 each, S Cluxton (1'45), D Bastick, P Flynn, B Cullen, K McMenamin, R McConnell 0-1 each, G Molloy 1-0 (o.g.) |

Croke Park, Dublin
Attendance: 43,983
Referee: Joe McQuillan (Cavan)
