= 2007 Leinster Junior Football Championship =

Irish youth football competition

The 2007 Leinster Junior Football Championship is the Junior "knockout" competition in the game of football played in the province of Leinster in Ireland. The series of games are organised by the Leinster Council. The Leinster football Final is played in Croke Park, Dublin.

== Quarter finals ==
Game	Date	Venue	Team A	Score	Team B	Score
Leinster JFC; Quarter Final	May 30	Newbridge	Kildare	1-14	Meath	2-13
Leinster JFC; Quarter Final	May 30	Wexford	Wexford	3-18	Kilkenny	0-10
Leinster JFC; Quarter Final	May 30	Parnell Park	Dublin; K Leahy 0-10 (0-9f), D Kelly 1–0, K Devine 0–1.	1-11	Louth; D Crilly 0-5 (0-2f), C Judge 0-3 (0-1f), P Carrie 0–2, E Carroll, E McCullough 0-1 each.	0-12
Leinster JFC; Quarter Final	May 30	Portlaoise	Laois		Wicklow	

== Semi finals ==
Game	Date	Venue	Team A	Score	Team B	Score
Leinster JFC; Semi Final	June 13	Parnell Park	Dublin; K Leahy 0-8 (0-3f, 0-1 '45'), K Kavanagh, G Cullen 0-2 each, D Kelly, C McGuinness, K Devine, D Daly 0-1 each.	0-16	Wicklow; D McGillicuddy 1–0, D Daly (0-1f), L Daly 0-2 each, C Kenny, P O'Brien, V Quigley (0-1f) 0-1 each.	1-7
Leinster JFC; Semi Final	June 13		Wexford	0–16	Meath	2–9

(5) 1 v 2, Newbridge/Navan, June 13. (6) 3 v 4, Parnell Park/Drogheda, June 13. Final: 5 v 6, Home venue of 5, June 27.
