= 2011 Leinster Senior Football Championship final =

2011 Leinster Football Final
- Event: 2011 Leinster Senior Football Championship
Wexford	Dublin
1-12	2-12
- Date: 10 July 2011
- Venue: Croke Park, Dublin
- Referee: Joe McQuillan (Cavan)
- Attendance: 43,983

The 2011 Leinster Senior Football Championship final was the last football match of the 2010 Leinster Senior Football Championship, played between Dublin and Wexford on 10 July 2011 in Croke Park, Dublin. Dublin were bidding for their sixth Leinster Championship in seven years while Wexford were bidding for their first Provincial Championship title since 1945.

Dublin won the match 2–12 to 1–12. It was the 50th time the county had won the Leinster Senior Football Championship.

== Route to the final ==
Preliminary round: Wexford 2-16 Offaly 0–8; Dublin (bye)
Quarter-finals: Dublin 1-16 Laois 0–11; Wexford 1-24 Westmeath 0-15
Semi-finals: Dublin 1-12 Kildare 1–11; Wexford 4-12 Carlow 0-10

== Match details ==
10 July 2011
14:00 UTC+1

Wexford	1-12 - 2-12	Dublin
B Brosnan 0-9 (4f, 2 '45), R Barry 1-0, C Lyng 0-2, A Flynn 0-1	Report	J McCarthy 1-0, A Brogan, B Brogan (1f) 0-3 each, S Cluxton (1'45), D Bastick, P Flynn, B Cullen, K McMenamin, R McConnell 0-1 each, G Molloy 1-0 (o.g.)

Croke Park, Dublin
Attendance: 43,983
Referee: Joe Mc Quillan (Cavan)

Wexford	Dublin
