= Mattie Forde =

Wexford Gaelic footballer

- Mattie Forde lining out for Wexford

Personal information
- Born: Ballyfad, County Wexford
- Height: 6 ft 5 in (196 cm)

Sport
- Sport: Gaelic football
- Position: Left corner-forward
Club
- Years: Club
- Kilanerin–Ballyfad
Club titles
- Wexford titles: 3
Inter-county
- Years: County
- 1999–2011: Wexford
Inter-county titles
- All Stars: 1

Mattie Forde is an Irish Gaelic footballer from Ballyfad, County Wexford, Ireland. He formerly played at senior level for the Wexford county team and received an All Star in 2004. He plays his club football for Kilanerin–Ballyfad, and also plays hurling for the club.

Forde established himself as one of the top forwards in the game, regularly racking up high scores.

He is his county's top scorer in National Football League history, finishing his career with 29–299 (386) in that competition.

He announced his retirement from inter-county football in January 2011.

== Football ==
=== Club ===
Forde won four Wexford SFC titles with Kilanerin–Ballyfad, being chosen as man-of-the-match in two of the finals. He won a Leinster Club IFC title in 2016.

Forde also plays hurling with the club, and was man-of-the-match when they won the Intermediate title in 2003.

=== Inter-county ===
Forde had an excellent year in 2004. He was top scorer in that year's National League, with a total of 8–36 (60 points). His excellent form continued in the championship, as he helped steer Wexford to a first Leinster SFC semi-final since 1994, which his team lost to Westmeath. He scored 2–10 in a subsequent 2004 All-Ireland SFC qualifier victory over Offaly, before a 3rd qualifying round defeat to Derry eliminated Wexford from the competition. Forde was the championship's top scorer with 3–38 (47). He was awarded an All Star for his performances that year, and, in doing so, became the first Wexfordman to receive this accolade. He was also named GPA Footballer of the Year.

In 2005, Forde was again top scorer in the 2005 National League, helping Wexford reach the final, where they lost to Armagh. He reached another Leinster SFC semi-final with Wexford, lost narrowly to Dublin, before bowing out to Monaghan in a 2005 All-Ireland SFC qualifier.

The following year, Forde was top scorer in Division 1 of the National League, but it was not enough to prevent relegation. He scored 0–12 to help Wexford defeat Meath in a 2006 Leinster SFC quarter-final. In subsequent Leinster SFC semi-final against Offaly, Forde scored 1–7, but still lost. However, during the game he was involved in a stamping incident, in which he stamped down on the back of the head of Offaly's Shane Sullivan. The referee did not see the incident, so Forde was allowed to play on. However, the incident was caught on camera. While he did play in the following Saturday's qualifier victory over Monaghan, in which he was top scorer with 0–6, a week later – at a meeting of the GAA's Central Disciplinary Committee – Forde was given a three-month suspension, ruling him out of Wexford's third round All-Ireland SFC qualifier meeting with Fermanagh, a game Wexford lost.

Wexford did not have a successful 2007, unable to achieve promotion from Division 3 of the restructured 2007 National League and losing to Laois in a Leinster SFC semi-final, before exiting the chanmpionship to Fermanagh in an All-Ireland SFC qualifier.

The following year proved much more successful. Wexford won Division 3 of the National League, defeating Fermanagh in the final. Having defeated Meath and Laois, Wexford advanced to the 2008 Leinster SFC final, but lost comprehensively to Dublin. However, subsequent victories over Down and Armagh, meant Wexford advanced to the 2008 All-Ireland SFC semi-final. Eventual All-Ireland champion Tyrone awaited, so Wexford lost. Forde had to be substituted due to injury at half-time in the game.

In January 2011, Forde confirmed his retirement from inter-county football. In February 2013, he said he would not be returning.

He later made a return to the Wexford colours with the county junior team, with whom he won a Leinster JFC title in 2016.

=== Province ===
Forde played for Leinster on a number of occasions. He was in the side that reached the 2004 Railway Cup final. A year later Forde was on the team that went one step further and won the competition, beating Ulster in the final.

=== International ===
Forde represented Ireland in the International Rules Series in 2004 and 2005.

== Rugby ==
Forde used to play rugby with local side Gorey RFC in Leinster League Division 4 Section D.
