= 1976–77 All-Ireland Senior Club Football Championship =

Irish Football Championship

- Teams: 33
- Champions: Austin Stacks (1st title)
- Runners-up: Ballerin

The 1976–77 All-Ireland Senior Club Football Championship was the seventh staging of the All-Ireland Senior Club Football Championship since its establishment by the Gaelic Athletic Association in 1970–71.

St Vincent's were the defending champions, however, they were beaten by Portlaoise in the second round of the Leinster Club Championship.

On 13 March 1977, Austin Stacks won the championship following a 1-13 to 2-07 defeat of Ballerin in the All-Ireland final at Croke Park. It remains their only championship title.

== Munster ==
=== First round ===
17 October 1976 First round	Galtee Rovers	2-05 - 1-10	Kilrush Shamrocks	Canon Hayes Park
	M McCarthy 1-1, S McCarthy 0-4, J O'Connell 1-0.		J O'Halloran 0-5, L McNamara 1-1, A Moloney 0-2, T Fitzpatrick 0-1, S Doherty 0-1.

14 November 1976 First round	Croom	2-05 - 2-04	John Mitchels	FitzGerald Park, Kilmallock
	P Kiely 1-3, D Carroll 1-0, M Culhane 0-1, J Collins 0-1.		P Flynn 1-1, T Power 1-0, V Kirwan 0-2, V Murphy 0-1.

=== Semi-finals ===
27 November 1976 Semi-final	Kilrush Shamrocks	0-10 - 1-10	St Finabrr's	The Cricket Field

28 November 1976 Semi-final	Austin Stacks	1-13 - 0-04	Croom	Austin Stack Park
	M Sheehy 0-5, P McCarthy 1-1, P Moriarty 0-2, D Long 0-2, C Mangan 0-1, J Power 0-1, Jackie Power 0-1.		P Kiely 0-2, V Shanahan 0-1, W Dunne 0-1.

=== Final ===
12 December 1976 Final	Austin Stacks	1-07 - 0-08	St Finbarr's	Austin Stack Park
	M Sheehy 1-4, P McCarthy 0-1, G Power 0-1, J O'Keeffe 0-1.		J Barry-Murphy 0-3, J O'Callaghan 0-3, R Kenny 0-1, G McCarthy 0-1.

== Quarter-final ==
30 January 1977 Quarter-final	Austin Stacks	2-16 - 0-07	Kingdom	Austin Stack Park

== Semi-finals ==
20 February 1977 Semi-final	Portlaoise	2-06 - 1-14	Austin Stacks	O'Moore Park

20 February 1977 Semi-final	Ballerin	5-09 - 1-04	Killererin	Tuam Stadium

== Final ==
13 March 1977 Final	Austin Stacks	1-13 - 2-07	Ballerin	Croke Park

== Statistics ==
=== Miscellaneous ===
- Killererin won the Connacht Club Championship title for the first time in their history.
- Ballerin won the Ulster Club Championship for the first time in their history.
