= Wexford county football team =

Gaelic football team

Wexford
- Sport: Football
- Irish: Loch Garman
- Nickname(s): The Model men The Slaneysiders; The Yellowbellies; The Purple and Gold
- County board: Wexford GAA
- Manager: John Hegarty
- Captain: Ben Brosnan
- Home venue(s): Wexford Park, Wexford

Recent competitive record
- Current All-Ireland status: Leinster (PR) in 2025
- Last championship title: 1918
- Current NFL Division: 2 (2nd in 2026; promoted to Division 2)
- Last league title: None
| First colours | Second colours |

The Wexford county football team represents Wexford in men's Gaelic football and is governed by Wexford GAA, the county board of the Gaelic Athletic Association. The team competes in the three major annual inter-county competitions; the All-Ireland Senior Football Championship, the Leinster Senior Football Championship and the National Football League.

Wexford's home ground is Wexford Park, Wexford. The team's manager is John Hegarty.

The team last won the Leinster Senior Championship in 1945, the All-Ireland Senior Championship in 1918 and has never won the National League.

== History ==
=== Early years ===
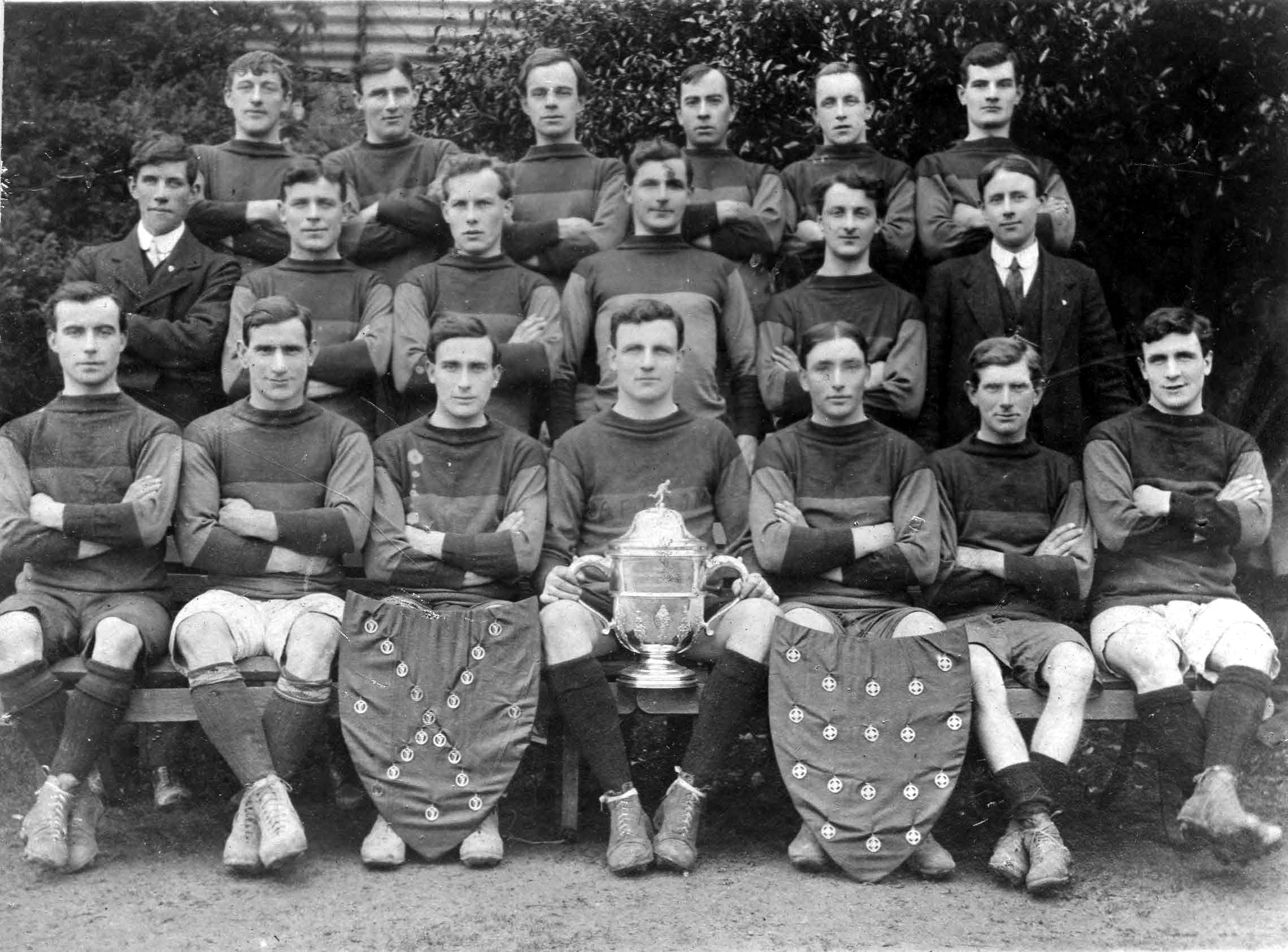
Team of Wexford, 1916 All-Ireland champions

Wexford had one of the greatest football teams in the history of the GAA in the 1910s, winning six consecutive Leinster Senior Football Championship (SFC) titles; it was also the first team to win four consecutive All-Ireland Senior Football Championship (SFC) titles. 1900 star James 'the Bull' Roche, who had fought for the World heavyweight boxing championship, trained that team, which featured Fr Ned Wheeler, Aidan Doyle and the O'Kennedy brothers, Gus and Seán, as players. The latter was the team captain. The feat of six consecutive Leinster SFC titles was only equalled in 1931, when Kildare won the sixth in a sequence that had begun in 1926.

Wexford's last major football success was winning the Leinster SFC title in 1945. From then on, the game of hurling took precedence in Wexford and as a consequence the fate of the Wexford footballers was to descend into obscurity for many decades.

=== Recent years ===
Following a 1999 National Football League game between Cavan and Wexford at Breffni Park, the Wexford manager Jo Jo Barrett assaulted referee Mick Curley and received a two-year ban.

Wexford reached the 2005 National Football League final under the management of Pat Roe, but lost to Armagh. That game was notable for a request for payment attributed to Roe appearing in the minutes of a Wexford County Board meeting; Roe, it was alleged in the minutes, had asked in advance of that game for a €5,000 bonus if Wexford defeated Armagh, whilst €3,000 would suffice in the event of a loss.

In manager Jason Ryan's first year in charge, Wexford defeated Fermanagh to win the 2008 National Football League Division 3 final in April of that year. This proved to be but the first success in what would be a historic year for Wexford football, as the team reached a first Leinster SFC final for more than 50 years. Along the way Wexford defeated Meath (recovering from a ten-point deficit to win the quarter-final, held at Dr Cullen Park in Carlow) and followed this with a comprehensive defeat of Laois in the Leinster SFC semi-final. This was Wexford's fifth consecutive appearance in a provincial semi-final, but the team's first victory. The final, however, was lost to Dublin, by a scoreline of 3–23 to 0–9. Wexford recovered from this defeat and advanced through the All-Ireland Series, unexpectedly defeating Down by seven points to reach the 2008 All-Ireland SFC quarter-finals. Armagh was the opponent in that game and Wexford secured another unexpected result, winning the game by a scoreline of 1–14 to 0–12 to reach a first All-Ireland SFC semi-final since 1945. Tyrone defeated Wexford by six points in that game, though the team was within two points of the competition's eventual winner as the match concluded.

Wexford again reached the final in the 2011 Leinster Senior Football Championship. That year the team had an easier run of fixtures to the final than in 2008, facing Offaly, Westmeath and Carlow. The final was again versus Dublin. A poor performance from Dublin's star player, Bernard Brogan, assisted Wexford's efforts to stay close to Dublin's score throughout the match; however, a bizarre own goal contributed to a loss — by a scoreline of 2–12 to 1–12 — to the team that would later win that year's All-Ireland SFC title. Wexford advanced Round 4 of the 2011 All-Ireland SFC qualifiers where the team faced Limerick. Wexford sustained a single-point loss, by a scoreline of 1–18 to 1–17.

Paul Galvin briefly managed Wexford during 2019 and 2020 before moving away mid-season while play was halted amid the impact of the COVID-19 pandemic on Gaelic games; his selector Shane Roche was appointed on an interim basis. Galvin's tenure involved most (but not all) of the 2020 National Football League campaign; he never actually managed Wexford in a championship game.

== Panel ==
Team as per Wexford vs Wicklow in the 2020 Leinster SFC quarter-final, 1 November 2020

| No. | Player | Position | Club |
|---|---|---|---|
| 1 | Pa Doyle | Goalkeeper | Rapparees Starlights |
| 2 | Martin O'Connor | Right corner back | HWH Bunclody |
| 3 | Gavin Sheehan | Full back | Gusserane O'Rahilly's |
| 4 | Eoin Porter | Left corner back | Rathgarogue–Cushinstown |
| 5 | Glen Malone | Right half back | Shelmaliers |
| 6 | Brian Malone | Centre back | Shelmaliers |
| 7 | Sean Ryan | Left half back | Gusserane O'Rahilly's |
| 8 | Niall Hughes | Midfield | Kilanerin–Ballyfad |
| 9 | Daithí Waters | Midfield | St Martin's |
| 10 | Alan Tobin | Right half forward | Rapparees Starlights |
| 11 | Donal Shanley | Centre forward | St Fintan's |
| 12 | Eoghan Nolan | Left half forward | Shelmaliers |
| 13 | Kevin O'Grady | Right corner forward | St James' |
| 14 | John Tubritt | Full forward | Fethard |
| 15 | Ben Brosnan (c) | Left corner forward | Castletown Liam Mellows |

| No. | Player | Position | Club |
|---|---|---|---|
| 16 | Ivan Meegan | Substitute | Ferns |
| 17 | Conor Carty | Substitute | Castletown Liam Mellows |
| 18 | Tom Byrne | Substitute | Kilmore |
| 19 | Páidí Hughes | Substitute | Kilanerin–Ballyfad |
| 20 | Liam Coleman | Substitute | Castletown Liam Mellows |
| 21 | James Stafford | Substitute | Glynn–Barntown |
| 22 | Jake Firman | Substitute | St Martin's |
| 23 | Jonathon Bealin | Substitute | Castletown Liam Mellows |
| 24 | Sean Nolan | Substitute | Horeswood |
| 25 | Nick Doyle | Substitute | Rapparees Starlights |
| 26 | Mark Rossiter | Substitute | Gusserane O'Rahilly's |

^{INJ} Player has had an injury which has affected recent involvement with the county team.
^{RET} Player has since retired from the county team.
^{WD} Player has since withdrawn from the county team due to a non-injury issue.

== Management team ==
- Manager: John Hegarty, appointed in Sep 2022
- Selectors: Yet to be confirmed, as of 21 September 2022

== Managerial history ==
Key
| * | Interim manager |

| Dates | Name | Origin |
|---|---|---|
| 1991–1995 | Liam Fardy | Gusserane |
| 1995–1998 | Cyril Hughes | |
| 1998–1999 | Jo Jo Barrett | |
| 1999–2002 | Ger Halligan | ? |
| 2002–2003 | Dom Twomey | |
| 2003–2005 | Pat Roe | |
| 2005–2007 | Paul Bealin | |
| 2007–2012 | Jason Ryan | |
| 2012–2014 | Aidan O'Brien | ? |
| 2014–2016 | David Power | |
| 2016–2017 | Séamus McEnaney | |
| 2017–2019 | Paul McLoughlin | |
| 2019–2020 | Paul Galvin | |
| 2020 | Shane Roche^{*} | Geraldine O'Hanrahans |
| 2021–2022 | Shane Roche | Geraldine O'Hanrahans |
| 2022– | John Hegarty | Kilanerin |

* Shane Roche was originally a selector but was appointed interim manager after Paul Galvin left suddenly in September 2020. Roche was formally ratified for a two-year term as manager in January 2021 then chose to leave without seeking a further term ahead of the 2023 season.

== Players ==
=== Records ===
- Mattie Forde is the team's top scorer in National Football League history and finished his career fourth in the all-time list (one point behind Offaly's Tony McTague). As of 2021, David Tubridy of Clare had pushed Forde into fifth place and Conor McManus of Monaghan was three points behind Forde (McManus was still involved and his team had a relegation play-off at the time this record was published).

==== Top scorers ====
- John Hegarty scored 21–125 while playing for Wexford between 1995 and 2006.

==== Most appearances ====
- David Murphy played for Wexford until 2013, when he retired with 180 caps, making him his county's most experienced player of all-time.
- Brian Malone: 174
  - In March 2024, Ben Brosnan made a record-equalling 174th appearance for Wexford, bringing him level with Brian Malone.
- Colm Morris: 164
- John Hegarty made 105 appearances between 1995 and 2006.

=== All Stars ===
Wexford has one All Star.

2004: Mattie Forde

== Crest and colours ==
Wexford classic kit

Wexford's sporting colours are purple and gold. This iconic choice was made in 1913 before using the colours of county champions clubs

Disposal of the colours is changed during the year, being the traditional kit mostly gold with a purple horizontal half. Since the 1990s purple has gained more importance and has been used in sleeves and with gradients. The current kit is mainly purple with golden trims.

The crest has been changed several times. Until 1996, the team used the town of Wexford's traditional crest (three burning wooden ships), then they adopted the county's new coat of arms. Since 2006, Wexford GAA launched its own logo, used also on team jerseys.

=== Team sponsorship ===
Zurich Insurance Group sponsored the team on a four-year deal from 2020, following an announcement in October 2019.

== Honours ==
=== National ===
- All-Ireland Senior Football Championship
  - (gold) Winners (5): 1893, 1915, 1916, 1917, 1918
  - (silver) Runners-up (3): 1890, 1913, 1914
- National Football League
  - (silver) Runners-up (3): 1937–38, 1945–46, 2005
- Tailteann Cup
  - Quarter-finalists (1): 2023
- Tommy Murphy Cup
  - (silver) Runners-up (1): 2005
- All-Ireland Junior Football Championship
  - (gold) Winners (1): 1992

=== Provincial ===
- Leinster Senior Football Championship
  - (gold) Winners (10): 1890, 1893, 1913, 1914, 1915, 1916, 1917, 1918, 1925, 1945
  - (silver) Runners-up (16): 1888, 1897, 1898, 1899, 1901, 1902, 1924, 1926, 1932, 1933, 1939, 1948, 1953, 1956, 2008, 2011
- Leinster Junior Football Championship
  - (gold) Winners (8): 1911, 1963, 1984, 1992, 2000, 2007, 2015, 2016
- Leinster Under-21 Football Championship
  - (gold) Winners (1): 2011
  - (silver) Runners-up (4): 1968, 1974, 1988, 2008
- Leinster Minor Football Championship
  - (gold) Winners (3): 1937, 1950, 1969
  - (silver) Runners-up (7): 1931, 1936, 1941, 1945, 1978, 1994, 1999
