= Kilanerin–Ballyfad GAA =

Gaelic sports club in County Wicklow, Ireland

Rockinerinfad
- Coill an Iarainn–Baile Fada
- Founded: 1953
- County: Wexford
- Colours: White and Red
- Grounds: Borleagh, Killinierin & The Rock
- Coordinates: 52.735375°N 6.284078°W

Playing kits
Standard colours

Senior Club Championships
	All Ireland	Leinster champions	Wexford champions
Football:	-	-	8

Kilanerin–Ballyfad GAA, often called simply Kilanerin, is a Gaelic football, hurling and ladies' Gaelic football club based in Kilanerin (Killinierin), County Wexford, Ireland.

== History ==
There were formerly three clubs in the parish: Kilanerin, Ballyfad and Pallas Parnells. In 1953 they amalgamated with Tara Rocks to form Kilanerin–Ballyfad. The mountain on the club crest is nearby Annagh Hill.

Kilanerin took their first Wexford Senior Football Championship in 1974. Their grounds in the Borleagh townland were acquired after that, and were further developed in 1998.

Kilanerin won six county football titles in the years 1993–2008. Their best season was 1996, when they reached the semi-finals of the Leinster Senior Club Football Championship, losing to St. Sylvesters.

Since then, they have been county finalists twice, in 2010 and 2018.

== Honours ==
- Leinster Intermediate Club Football Championship (1): 2017
- South Leinster Senior Club Championship (1): 1999
- Wexford Senior Football Championship (8): 1974, 1993, 1995, 1997, 1999, 2003, 2008, 2026
- Wexford Intermediate Football Championship (2): 1973, 1992
- Wexford Junior Football Championship: (1) 1967
- Wexford Junior Hurling Championship: (1) 1998

== Notable players ==
- Michael W. D'Arcy
- Mattie Forde
- John Hegarty, won the Wexford SFC with the club as player-manager
