= Séamus Murphy (Wexford hurler) =

Wexford hurler and manager

Personal information
- Native name: Séamus Ó Murchú (Irish)
- Born: Rathnure, County Wexford

Sport
- Sport: Hurling
- Position: Forward
Club
- Years: Club
- Rathnure
Inter-county
- Years: County
- 1970s–1980s: Wexford
Inter-county titles
- Leinster titles: 0
- All-Irelands: 0

Séamus Murphy (born 1950s in Rathnure, County Wexford) is an Irish former hurling manager and player.

== Career ==
He played hurling for his local club Rathnure and at senior level for the Wexford county team in the 1970s and early 1980s.

=== Coaching career ===
He retired from playing and became a manager due to a shoulder injury received during practice for the 1979 Wexford county title. Physiotherapy and medical treatments were unsuccessful, and Rathnure asked him to coach the minor and juvenile teams in 1981. Both teams won titles in his first season as coach.

While coaching Rathnure, Murphy also worked as a construction worker for Dublin company Collen Construction.

Murphy was the coach for the Wexford under-21 team when they won titles in 2001 and 2002. He had hoped to become manager of the senior Wexford team in 2001 when Tony Dempsey stepped down, but he was not considered for the post. By the end of 2004, he had won 77 titles at different level of hurling. He became senior hurling manager for Wexford at the end of 2004, replacing John Conran, who he had played with at Rathnure. He also managed Wexford's Intermediate hurlers, who won the All-Ireland title in September 2005, the first time Wexford had won since 1964. He was reappointed for the 2006 season, but decided to retire before the 2007 season after a 25-year hurling career.

== Personal life ==
Murphy is an amateur musician, playing guitar and accordion. He is married with two children.

Sporting positions
Preceded by John Conran	Wexford Senior Hurling Manager; 2004-2006	Succeeded by John Meyler
Preceded by Martin Storey	Wicklow Senior Hurling Manager; 2016-2018	Succeeded by Éamonn Scallan
