= Bob Lambert =

Bob or Robert Lambert may refer to:

- Bob Lambert (cricketer) (1874–1956), Irish cricketer
- Bob Lambert (undercover police officer) (born 1952), British academic, former undercover police officer who infiltrated activist groups
- Bob Lambert (executive) (c. 1957–2012), American media executive
- Robert Lambert (speedway rider) (born 1998), British speedway rider
- Robert Lambert (Irish republican) (1896–1970), Irish republican
- Robert Lambert (Royal Navy officer) (1771–1836), British admiral
- Robert Lambert (academic) (1677–1735), English priest and academic
