= James Shannon =

James Shannon may refer to:

== People ==
- James Shannon (Massachusetts politician) (born 1952), US Representative from Massachusetts
- James Shannon (academic) (1799–1859), president of the University of Missouri
- James Shannon (Australian politician) (1840–1891)
- James Jebusa Shannon (1862–1923), American artist
- James Shannon (Irish politician) (died 1933), Irish Labour Party politician represented Wexford in 1927
- James Royce Shannon (1881–1946), Irish-American composer and lyricist
- James C. Shannon (1896–1980), U.S. politician
- James A. Shannon (1904–1994), American physician, head of National Institutes of Health
- James Patrick Shannon (1921–2003), American Roman Catholic bishop
- Jim Shannon (born 1955), Northern Irish Democratic Unionist politician
- James Shannon (cricketer) (born 1990), Irish cricketer

== Characters ==
- James Wiley Shannon, an unseen character in In Plain Sight
- James "Jim" Shannon, the lead character of Terra Nova
