= John Conran =

Wexford hurler and manager

Personal information
- Native name: Seán Ó Conaráin (Irish)
- Born: 1957 (age 68–69) Rathnure, County Wexford, Ireland

Sport
- Sport: Hurling
- Position: Full-back
Club
- Years: Club
- 1975–1999: Rathnure
Club titles
- Wexford titles: 8
- Leinster titles: 4
- All-Ireland Titles: 0
Inter-county
- Years: County
- 1976–1991: Wexford
Inter-county titles
- Leinster titles: 2 (as sub)
- All-Irelands: 0
- NHL: 0
- All Stars: 1

John Conran (born 1957 in Rathnure, County Wexford, Ireland) is an Irish former hurling manager and player. He played hurling for his local club Rathnure and at senior level for the Wexford county team from 1976 until 1991. Conran served as manager of Wexford from 2002 until 2004.

Sporting positions
Preceded by Tony Dempsey	Wexford Senior Hurling Manager; 2002–2004	Succeeded by Séamus Murphy
