= Michael Jordan (politician) =

Irish politician)

Teachta Dála
- In office September 1927 – February 1932
- Constituency: Wexford

Personal details
- Party: Farmers' Party
- Other political affiliations: Cumann na nGaedheal

Michael Jordan was an Irish politician. A farmer, he was an unsuccessful candidate at the 1922, 1923 and June 1927 general elections. He was first elected to Dáil Éireann at the September 1927 general election as a Farmers' Party Teachta Dála (TD) for the Wexford constituency. He stood as a Cumann na nGaedheal candidate at the 1932 general election but was not re-elected.

Dáil	Election	Deputy (Party)	Deputy (Party)	Deputy (Party)	Deputy (Party)	Deputy (Party)
2nd	1921	Richard Corish (SF)	James Ryan (SF)	Séamus Doyle (SF)	Seán Etchingham (SF)	4 seats 1921–1923
3rd	1922	Richard Corish (Lab)	Daniel O'Callaghan (Lab)	Séamus Doyle (AT-SF)	Michael Doyle (FP)	4 seats 1921–1923
4th	1923	Richard Corish (Lab)	James Ryan (Rep)	Robert Lambert (Rep)	Michael Doyle (FP)	Osmond Esmonde (CnaG)
5th	1927 (Jun)	Richard Corish (Lab)	James Ryan (FF)	James Shannon (Lab)	Michael Doyle (FP)	John Keating (NL)
6th	1927 (Sep)	Richard Corish (Lab)	James Ryan (FF)	Denis Allen (FF)	Michael Jordan (FP)	Osmond Esmonde (CnaG)
7th	1932	Richard Corish (Lab)	James Ryan (FF)	Denis Allen (FF)	John Keating (CnaG)	Osmond Esmonde (CnaG)
8th	1933	Richard Corish (Lab)	James Ryan (FF)	Patrick Kehoe (FF)	John Keating (CnaG)	Osmond Esmonde (CnaG)
8th	1936 by-election	Richard Corish (Lab)	James Ryan (FF)	Patrick Kehoe (FF)	John Keating (CnaG)	Denis Allen (FF)
9th	1937	Richard Corish (Lab)	James Ryan (FF)	John Keating (FG)	John Esmonde (FG)	Denis Allen (FF)
10th	1938	Richard Corish (Lab)	James Ryan (FF)	John Keating (FG)	John Esmonde (FG)	Denis Allen (FF)
11th	1943	Richard Corish (Lab)	James Ryan (FF)	John O'Leary (Lab)	John Esmonde (FG)	Denis Allen (FF)
12th	1944	Richard Corish (Lab)	James Ryan (FF)	John O'Leary (NLP)	John Keating (FG)	Denis Allen (FF)
12th	1945 by-election	Brendan Corish (Lab)	James Ryan (FF)	John O'Leary (NLP)	John Keating (FG)	Denis Allen (FF)
13th	1948	Brendan Corish (Lab)	James Ryan (FF)	John O'Leary (NLP)	John Esmonde (FG)	Denis Allen (FF)
14th	1951	Brendan Corish (Lab)	James Ryan (FF)	John O'Leary (Lab)	Anthony Esmonde (FG)	Denis Allen (FF)
15th	1954	Brendan Corish (Lab)	James Ryan (FF)	John O'Leary (Lab)	Anthony Esmonde (FG)	Denis Allen (FF)
16th	1957	Brendan Corish (Lab)	James Ryan (FF)	Seán Browne (FF)	Anthony Esmonde (FG)	Denis Allen (FF)
17th	1961	Brendan Corish (Lab)	James Ryan (FF)	Lorcan Allen (FF)	Anthony Esmonde (FG)	4 seats 1961–1981
18th	1965	Brendan Corish (Lab)	James Kennedy (FF)	Lorcan Allen (FF)	Anthony Esmonde (FG)	4 seats 1961–1981
19th	1969	Brendan Corish (Lab)	Seán Browne (FF)	Lorcan Allen (FF)	Anthony Esmonde (FG)	4 seats 1961–1981
20th	1973	Brendan Corish (Lab)	Seán Browne (FF)	Lorcan Allen (FF)	John Esmonde (FG)	4 seats 1961–1981
21st	1977	Brendan Corish (Lab)	Seán Browne (FF)	Lorcan Allen (FF)	Michael D'Arcy (FG)	4 seats 1961–1981
22nd	1981	Brendan Corish (Lab)	Ivan Yates (FG)	Lorcan Allen (FF)	Michael D'Arcy (FG)	Hugh Byrne (FF)
23rd	1982 (Feb)	Seán Browne (FF)	Ivan Yates (FG)	Lorcan Allen (FF)	Michael D'Arcy (FG)	Hugh Byrne (FF)
24th	1982 (Nov)	Avril Doyle (FG)	Ivan Yates (FG)	John Browne (FF)	Michael D'Arcy (FG)	Hugh Byrne (FF)
25th	1987	Avril Doyle (FG)	Ivan Yates (FG)	John Browne (FF)	Brendan Howlin (Lab)	Hugh Byrne (FF)
26th	1989	Michael D'Arcy (FG)	Ivan Yates (FG)	John Browne (FF)	Brendan Howlin (Lab)	Séamus Cullimore (FF)
27th	1992	Avril Doyle (FG)	Ivan Yates (FG)	John Browne (FF)	Brendan Howlin (Lab)	Hugh Byrne (FF)
28th	1997	Michael D'Arcy (FG)	Ivan Yates (FG)	John Browne (FF)	Brendan Howlin (Lab)	Hugh Byrne (FF)
29th	2002	Paul Kehoe (FG)	Liam Twomey (Ind.)	John Browne (FF)	Brendan Howlin (Lab)	Tony Dempsey (FF)
30th	2007	Paul Kehoe (FG)	Michael W. D'Arcy (FG)	John Browne (FF)	Brendan Howlin (Lab)	Seán Connick (FF)
31st	2011	Paul Kehoe (FG)	Liam Twomey (FG)	John Browne (FF)	Brendan Howlin (Lab)	Mick Wallace (Ind.)
32nd	2016	Paul Kehoe (FG)	Michael W. D'Arcy (FG)	James Browne (FF)	Brendan Howlin (Lab)	Mick Wallace (I4C)
32nd	2019 by-election	Paul Kehoe (FG)	Michael W. D'Arcy (FG)	James Browne (FF)	Brendan Howlin (Lab)	Malcolm Byrne (FF)
33rd	2020	Paul Kehoe (FG)	Verona Murphy (Ind.)	James Browne (FF)	Brendan Howlin (Lab)	Johnny Mythen (SF)
34th	2024	4 seats since 2024	Verona Murphy (Ind.)	James Browne (FF)	George Lawlor (Lab)	Johnny Mythen (SF)
