= Wexford (Dáil constituency) =

Dáil constituency (1921–present)

- Dáil constituency
- Location of Wexford within Ireland
- Interactive map of constituency boundaries since the 2024 general election
- Major settlements: Enniscorthy; New Ross; Wexford

Current constituency
- Created: 1921
- Seats: 4 (1921–1923); 5 (1923–1961); 4 (1961–1981); 5 (1981–2024); 4 (2024–)
- TDs: James Browne (FF); George Lawlor (Lab); Verona Murphy (Ind); Johnny Mythen (SF)
- Local government area: County Wexford
- Created from: North Wexford; South Wexford
- EP constituency: South

Wexford is a parliamentary constituency represented in Dáil Éireann, the lower house of the Irish parliament or Oireachtas. The constituency elects four deputies (Teachtaí Dála, commonly known as TDs) on the electoral system of proportional representation by means of the single transferable vote (PR-STV).

== Boundaries ==
The constituency was created by the Government of Ireland Act 1920 and first used at the 1921 elections electing 4 deputies. Before 2024, it spanned the entire area of County Wexford, taking in Wexford, Enniscorthy, New Ross and Gorey.

The Constituency Review Report 2023 of the Electoral Commission recommended that at the next general election, Wexford lose a seat to become a four-seat constituency with the transfer of territory in the north of County Wexford to the new constituency of Wicklow–Wexford.

For the 2024 general election, the Electoral (Amendment) Act 2023 defines the constituency as:

"The county of Wexford except the part thereof which is comprised in the constituency of Wicklow-Wexford."

Changes to the Wexford constituency
Years	TDs	Boundaries	Notes
1921–1923	4	The county of Wexford.	Constituency created from North Wexford and South Wexford
1923–1937	5	The county of Wexford.	
1937–1948	5	The county of Wexford and; in the county of Carlow the district electoral divisions of Ballyellin, Ballymurphy, Borris, Coonogue, Corries, Glynn, Killedmond, Kyle, Marley, Rathanna, Sliguff and Tinnahinch.	Transfer from Carlow–Kilkenny
1948–1961	5	The county of Wexford.	
1961–1981	4	The county of Wexford, except the part in the constituency of Carlow–Kilkenny.	
1981–2024	5	The county of Wexford.	
2024–	4	The county of Wexford except the part thereof which is comprised in the constituency of Wicklow–Wexford.	Transfer to Wicklow–Wexford of the electoral divisions of: Ballindaggan, Ballycarney, Ballymore, Castledockrell, Ferns, Kilbora, Kilcormick, Kilrush, Moyacomb, Newtownbarry, Rossard, St. Mary's, The Harrow, Tinnacross, Tombrack, in the former Rural District of Enniscorthy; Ardamine, Balloughter, Ballybeg, Ballycanew, Ballyellis, Ballygarrett, Ballylarkin, Ballynestragh, Cahore, Coolgreany, Courtown, Ford, Gorey Rural, Gorey Urban, Huntingtown, Kilcomb, Kilgorman, Killenagh, Killincooly, Kilnahue, Limerick, Monamolin, Monaseed, Rossminoge, Wells, Wingfield, in the former Rural District of Gorey."

== TDs ==
Teachtaí Dála (TDs) for Wexford 1921–
Key to parties: CnaG = Cumann na nGaedheal; FP = Farmers' Party; FF = Fianna Fáil; FG = Fine Gael; Ind. = Independent; I4C = Inds. 4 Change; Lab = Labour; NLP = National Labour Party; NL = National League; Rep = Republican; AT-SF = Sinn Féin (Anti-Treaty); SF = Sinn Féin
Dáil	Election	Deputy (Party)	Deputy (Party)	Deputy (Party)	Deputy (Party)	Deputy (Party)
2nd	1921	Richard Corish (SF)	James Ryan (SF)	Séamus Doyle (SF)	Seán Etchingham (SF)	4 seats 1921–1923
3rd	1922	Richard Corish (Lab)	Daniel O'Callaghan (Lab)	Séamus Doyle (AT-SF)	Michael Doyle (FP)	4 seats 1921–1923
4th	1923	Richard Corish (Lab)	James Ryan (Rep)	Robert Lambert (Rep)	Michael Doyle (FP)	Osmond Esmonde (CnaG)
5th	1927 (Jun)	Richard Corish (Lab)	James Ryan (FF)	James Shannon (Lab)	Michael Doyle (FP)	John Keating (NL)
6th	1927 (Sep)	Richard Corish (Lab)	James Ryan (FF)	Denis Allen (FF)	Michael Jordan (FP)	Osmond Esmonde (CnaG)
7th	1932	Richard Corish (Lab)	James Ryan (FF)	Denis Allen (FF)	John Keating (CnaG)	Osmond Esmonde (CnaG)
8th	1933	Richard Corish (Lab)	James Ryan (FF)	Patrick Kehoe (FF)	John Keating (CnaG)	Osmond Esmonde (CnaG)
8th	1936 by-election	Richard Corish (Lab)	James Ryan (FF)	Patrick Kehoe (FF)	John Keating (CnaG)	Denis Allen (FF)
9th	1937	Richard Corish (Lab)	James Ryan (FF)	John Keating (FG)	John Esmonde (FG)	Denis Allen (FF)
10th	1938	Richard Corish (Lab)	James Ryan (FF)	John Keating (FG)	John Esmonde (FG)	Denis Allen (FF)
11th	1943	Richard Corish (Lab)	James Ryan (FF)	John O'Leary (Lab)	John Esmonde (FG)	Denis Allen (FF)
12th	1944	Richard Corish (Lab)	James Ryan (FF)	John O'Leary (NLP)	John Keating (FG)	Denis Allen (FF)
12th	1945 by-election	Brendan Corish (Lab)	James Ryan (FF)	John O'Leary (NLP)	John Keating (FG)	Denis Allen (FF)
13th	1948	Brendan Corish (Lab)	James Ryan (FF)	John O'Leary (NLP)	John Esmonde (FG)	Denis Allen (FF)
14th	1951	Brendan Corish (Lab)	James Ryan (FF)	John O'Leary (Lab)	Anthony Esmonde (FG)	Denis Allen (FF)
15th	1954	Brendan Corish (Lab)	James Ryan (FF)	John O'Leary (Lab)	Anthony Esmonde (FG)	Denis Allen (FF)
16th	1957	Brendan Corish (Lab)	James Ryan (FF)	Seán Browne (FF)	Anthony Esmonde (FG)	Denis Allen (FF)
17th	1961	Brendan Corish (Lab)	James Ryan (FF)	Lorcan Allen (FF)	Anthony Esmonde (FG)	4 seats 1961–1981
18th	1965	Brendan Corish (Lab)	James Kennedy (FF)	Lorcan Allen (FF)	Anthony Esmonde (FG)	4 seats 1961–1981
19th	1969	Brendan Corish (Lab)	Seán Browne (FF)	Lorcan Allen (FF)	Anthony Esmonde (FG)	4 seats 1961–1981
20th	1973	Brendan Corish (Lab)	Seán Browne (FF)	Lorcan Allen (FF)	John Esmonde (FG)	4 seats 1961–1981
21st	1977	Brendan Corish (Lab)	Seán Browne (FF)	Lorcan Allen (FF)	Michael D'Arcy (FG)	4 seats 1961–1981
22nd	1981	Brendan Corish (Lab)	Ivan Yates (FG)	Lorcan Allen (FF)	Michael D'Arcy (FG)	Hugh Byrne (FF)
23rd	1982 (Feb)	Seán Browne (FF)	Ivan Yates (FG)	Lorcan Allen (FF)	Michael D'Arcy (FG)	Hugh Byrne (FF)
24th	1982 (Nov)	Avril Doyle (FG)	Ivan Yates (FG)	John Browne (FF)	Michael D'Arcy (FG)	Hugh Byrne (FF)
25th	1987	Avril Doyle (FG)	Ivan Yates (FG)	John Browne (FF)	Brendan Howlin (Lab)	Hugh Byrne (FF)
26th	1989	Michael D'Arcy (FG)	Ivan Yates (FG)	John Browne (FF)	Brendan Howlin (Lab)	Séamus Cullimore (FF)
27th	1992	Avril Doyle (FG)	Ivan Yates (FG)	John Browne (FF)	Brendan Howlin (Lab)	Hugh Byrne (FF)
28th	1997	Michael D'Arcy (FG)	Ivan Yates (FG)	John Browne (FF)	Brendan Howlin (Lab)	Hugh Byrne (FF)
29th	2002	Paul Kehoe (FG)	Liam Twomey (Ind.)	John Browne (FF)	Brendan Howlin (Lab)	Tony Dempsey (FF)
30th	2007	Paul Kehoe (FG)	Michael W. D'Arcy (FG)	John Browne (FF)	Brendan Howlin (Lab)	Seán Connick (FF)
31st	2011	Paul Kehoe (FG)	Liam Twomey (FG)	John Browne (FF)	Brendan Howlin (Lab)	Mick Wallace (Ind.)
32nd	2016	Paul Kehoe (FG)	Michael W. D'Arcy (FG)	James Browne (FF)	Brendan Howlin (Lab)	Mick Wallace (I4C)
32nd	2019 by-election	Paul Kehoe (FG)	Michael W. D'Arcy (FG)	James Browne (FF)	Brendan Howlin (Lab)	Malcolm Byrne (FF)
33rd	2020	Paul Kehoe (FG)	Verona Murphy (Ind.)	James Browne (FF)	Brendan Howlin (Lab)	Johnny Mythen (SF)
34th	2024	4 seats since 2024	Verona Murphy (Ind.)	James Browne (FF)	George Lawlor (Lab)	Johnny Mythen (SF)

Note: The columns in this table are used only for presentational purposes, and no significance should be attached to the order of columns. For details of the order in which seats were won at each election, see the detailed results of that election.

== Elections ==
*: Outgoing TD

=== 2024 general election ===
2024 general election: Wexford
Party	Candidate	FPv%	Count										
Party	Candidate	FPv%	1	2	3	4	5	6	7	8	9	10	11
Independent	Verona Murphy	21.6	11,340										
Fianna Fáil	James Browne	16.4	8,596	8,716	8,716	8,870	8,880	8,986	9,068	9,418	9,647	10,397	11,292
Sinn Féin	Johnny Mythen	14.5	7,633	7,726	7,736	7,748	7,775	7,923	8,292	8,525	9,213	9,352	10,550
Labour	George Lawlor	13.8	7,228	7,327	7,332	7,359	7,372	7,395	7,991	8,165	8,552	8,991	10,066
Fine Gael	Cathal Byrne	9.3	4,891	4,942	4,942	4,955	4,960	5,006	5,057	5,113	5,192	7,069	7,439
Aontú	Jim Codd	7.2	3,775	3,904	3,918	3,931	4,114	4,138	4,192	4,381	4,869	5,078	
Fine Gael	Bridín Murphy	5.7	2,997	3,094	3,095	3,139	3,142	3,157	3,239	3,593	3,756		
Independent	Michael Sheehan	3.1	1,623	1,736	1,749	1,759	1,786	1,842	1,890				
Inds. 4 Change	Mick Wallace	3.1	1,615	1,700	1,710	1,724	1,790	1,877	2,112	2,420			
PBP–Solidarity	Martina Stafford (Note: Stafford is a member of Solidarity.)	1.5	782	793	795	801	805	814					
Green	Peadar McDonald	1.4	731	736	738	742	745	757					
Independent	Jackser Owens	0.9	498	513	516	518	561						
National Party	Jason Murphy	0.6	333	338	448	449							
Fianna Fáil	Michelle O'Neill	0.6	296	306	306								
The Irish People	Stephen Power	0.3	170	175									
Electorate: 85,744 Valid: 52,508 Spoilt: 336 Quota: 10,502 Turnout: 61.6%

=== 2020 general election ===
2020 general election: Wexford
Party	Candidate	FPv%	Count										
Party	Candidate	FPv%	1	2	3	4	5	6	7	8	9	10	11
Sinn Féin	Johnny Mythen	24.9	18,717										
Labour	Brendan Howlin	12.3	9,223	9,911	10,120	10,271	10,451	11,320	12,307	12,930			
Fianna Fáil	James Browne	10.7	8,058	8,462	8,858	8,913	9,075	9,151	9,246	10,432	11,085	11,188	11,660
Fine Gael	Michael W. D'Arcy	8.6	6,472	6,577	6,610	6,656	6,692	6,857	6,922	7,020	7,357	7,395	
Fine Gael	Paul Kehoe	8.4	6,337	6,455	6,483	6,522	6,574	6,677	6,712	7,060	7,416	7,488	11,537
Fianna Fáil	Malcolm Byrne	8.2	6,145	6,338	6,541	6,564	6,640	6,750	6,843	7,535	7,909	7,994	9,537
Independent	Verona Murphy	7.8	5,825	6,498	6,664	6,841	7,118	7,250	7,820	9,014	10,995	11,114	11,849
Fianna Fáil	Michael Sheehan	5.8	4,366	4,508	4,674	4,714	4,817	4,881	4,932				
Independent	Ger Carthy	4.0	3,024	3,603	3,746	3,923	4,437	4,636	5,738	6,004			
Green	Paula Roseingrave	2.7	2,028	2,374	2,399	2,584	2,683						
Aontú	Jim Codd	2.0	1,518	1,865	1,905	2,015							
Solidarity–PBP	Deirdre Wadding (Note: Wadding was a member of People Before Profit.)	1.5	1,116	2,902	2,932	3,376	3,599	4,359					
Fianna Fáil	Lisa McDonald	1.8	1,351	1,411									
Inds. 4 Change	Seanie O'Shea	1.1	825	1,553	1,590								
Independent	Bart Murphy	0.1	68	103									
Electorate: 113,092 Valid: 75,073 Spoilt: 549 Quota: 12,513 Turnout: 75,622 (66.9%)

=== 2019 by-election ===
Mick Wallace was elected for the South constituency at the 2019 European Parliament election on 24 May, vacating his Dáil seat on 1 July. A by-election was held to fill the vacancy on 29 November 2019.

2019 by-election: Wexford
Party	Candidate	FPv%	Count				
Party	Candidate	FPv%	1	2	3	4	5
Fianna Fáil	Malcolm Byrne	31.2	12,506	12,660	13,082	14,729	18,830
Fine Gael	Verona Murphy	23.8	9,543	9,620	9,943	10,836	
Labour	George Lawlor	20.0	8,024	8,112	8,517	10,907	14,476
Sinn Féin	Johnny Mythen	10.3	4,125	4,344	4,665		
Green	Karin Dubsky	6.2	2,490	2,745	3,037		
Aontú	Jim Codd	5.2	2,102	2,395			
Solidarity–PBP	Cinnamon Blackmore	1.6	659				
Irish Freedom	Melissa O'Neill	1.2	489				
Independent	Charlie Keddy	0.3	130				
Electorate: 114,483 Valid: 40,068 Spoilt: 314 (0.8%) Quota: 20,035 Turnout: 40,382 (35.3%)

=== 2016 general election ===
2016 general election: Wexford
Party	Candidate	FPv%	Count													
Party	Candidate	FPv%	1	2	3	4	5	6	7	8	9	10	11	12	13	14
Labour	Brendan Howlin	14.8	10,574	10,635	10,731	10,907	11,140	11,200	11,311	11,769	12,071					
Fianna Fáil	James Browne	13.7	9,827	9,850	9,937	9,983	10,007	10,066	10,095	10,150	11,699	12,434				
Inds. 4 Change	Mick Wallace	11.1	7,917	8,013	8,237	8,398	8,468	8,853	9,575	10,213	10,625	11,817	11,887	11,930	13,420	
Fine Gael	Michael W. D'Arcy	10.9	7,798	7,803	7,830	7,913	8,334	8,357	8,390	8,490	8,574	8,884	8,917	8,950	11,371	11,645
Fine Gael	Paul Kehoe	10.7	7,696	7,703	7,764	7,808	8,152	8,259	8,284	8,344	8,522	8,874	8,922	8,949	9,593	9,704
Sinn Féin	Johnny Mythen	10.1	7,260	7,357	7,415	7,451	7,466	7,712	8,036	8,248	8,350	8,795	8,824	8,832	9,405	9,652
Fianna Fáil	Malcolm Byrne	8.5	6,115	6,123	6,139	6,204	6,222	6,241	6,286	6,367	6,950	7,122	7,393	7,409		
Fianna Fáil	Aoife Byrne	4.4	3,164	3,181	3,252	3,292	3,357	3,462	3,513	3,585						
Independent	Ger Carthy	4.4	3,134	3,189	3,268	3,307	3,351	3,428	3,563	3,855	4,041					
Social Democrats	Leonard Kelly	2.3	1,635	1,677	1,707	1,883	1,907	1,939	2,179							
AAA–PBP	Deirdre Wadding	2.1	1,472	1,558	1,616	1,731	1,749	1,843								
Independent	John Dwyer	1.8	1,265	1,279	1,323	1,355	1,362									
Fine Gael	Julie Hogan	1.7	1,214	1,233	1,266	1,305										
Green	Ann Walsh	1.5	1,056	1,064	1,093											
Independent	Caroline Foxe	1.3	930	956												
Independent	Emmet Moloney	0.7	476													
Direct Democracy	David Lloyd	0.2	128													
Electorate: 109,861 Valid: 71,661 Spoilt: 691 (1.0%) Quota: 11,944 Turnout: 72,352 (65.9%)

=== 2011 general election ===
2011 general election: Wexford
Party	Candidate	FPv%	Count						
Party	Candidate	FPv%	1	2	3	4	5	6	7
Independent	Mick Wallace	17.6	13,329						
Labour	Brendan Howlin	14.6	11,005	11,166	11,662	14,514			
Fine Gael	Liam Twomey	12.2	9,230	9,349	9,525	9,693	10,453	10,874	11,596
Fine Gael	Michael W. D'Arcy	11.1	8,418	8,466	8,595	8,960	9,492	9,986	10,410
Fine Gael	Paul Kehoe	11.1	8,386	8,459	8,627	9,125	9,674	10,256	11,046
Fianna Fáil	John Browne	9.7	7,352	7,394	7,470	7,749	8,175	8,400	12,757
Fianna Fáil	Seán Connick	8.8	6,675	6,744	7,014	7,144	7,396	7,515	
Labour	Pat Cody	5.9	4,457	4,505	4,752				
Sinn Féin	Anthony Kelly	5.8	4,353	4,422	4,901	5,181			
Independent	John Dwyer	1.2	908	943					
People Before Profit	Seamus O'Brien (Note: O'Brien campaigned as a member of the United Left Alliance.)	1.0	741	778					
Green	Danny Forde	0.5	391	399					
Independent	Siobhán Roseingrave	0.2	175	195					
Independent	Ruairí de Valera	0.2	119	129					
Electorate: 111,063 Valid: 75,539 Spoilt: 812 (1.1%) Quota: 12,590 Turnout: 76,351 (68.7%)

=== 2007 general election ===
2007 general election: Wexford
Party	Candidate	FPv%	Count						
Party	Candidate	FPv%	1	2	3	4	5	6	7
Fianna Fáil	John Browne	18.6	12,768						
Fianna Fáil	Seán Connick	14.3	9,826	10,396	10,476	10,862	11,850		
Labour	Brendan Howlin	13.8	9,445	9,540	10,008	10,413	11,852		
Fine Gael	Paul Kehoe	12.3	8,459	8,628	8,728	8,931	9,567	12,879	
Fine Gael	Michael W. D'Arcy	11.2	7,692	7,756	7,861	8,274	8,730	10,373	11,673
Fianna Fáil	Lisa McDonald	9.3	6,355	6,669	6,757	7,189	7,752	8,430	8,572
Fine Gael	Liam Twomey	8.0	5,507	5,531	5,678	5,927	6,308		
Sinn Féin	John Dwyer	7.4	5,065	5,125	5,302	5,431			
Progressive Democrats	Colm O'Gorman	3.1	2,162	2,188	2,322				
Green	Tom Harpur	1.2	802	807					
Independent	Alan McGuire	0.8	532	539					
Electorate: 103,562 Valid: 68,616 Spoilt: 827 (1.2%) Quota: 11,437 Turnout: 69,443 (67.1%)

=== 2002 general election ===
2002 general election: Wexford
Party	Candidate	FPv%	Count							
Party	Candidate	FPv%	1	2	3	4	5	6	7	8
Fianna Fáil	John Browne	15.1	9,150	9,181	9,518	9,609	10,178			
Labour	Brendan Howlin	13.2	7,995	8,073	8,201	8,924	10,135			
Fianna Fáil	Hugh Byrne	12.5	7,556	7,574	7,620	7,755	8,236	8,702	9,013	9,072
Fianna Fáil	Tony Dempsey	12.4	7,520	7,560	7,635	7,793	8,196	8,823	9,102	9,150
Fine Gael	Paul Kehoe	11.7	7,048	7,099	7,387	8,791	9,195	12,631		
Independent	Liam Twomey	9.6	5,815	6,010	6,213	6,574	8,062	8,740	10,082	
Sinn Féin	John Dwyer	8.2	4,964	5,020	5,148	5,217				
Fine Gael	Michael D'Arcy	7.5	4,564	4,597	4,625	5,645	5,835			
Fine Gael	Avril Doyle	6.5	3,940	3,969	4,011					
Independent	Seán Doyle	2.1	1,274	1,315						
Independent	Miranda Ó Bulguidhir	0.7	424							
Christian Solidarity	Michael O'Connor	0.3	173							
Electorate: 94,586 Valid: 60,423 Spoilt: 1,017 (1.7%) Quota: 10,071 Turnout: 61,440 (64.9%)

=== 1997 general election ===
1997 general election: Wexford
Party	Candidate	FPv%	Count							
Party	Candidate	FPv%	1	2	3	4	5	6	7	8
Fine Gael	Ivan Yates	18.0	10,024							
Labour	Brendan Howlin	17.1	9,510							
Fianna Fáil	John Browne	15.5	8,646	8,744	8,854	8,994	9,153	9,176	9,570	
Fianna Fáil	Hugh Byrne	12.6	7,003	7,035	7,084	7,179	7,304	7,323	7,720	8,416
Fine Gael	Michael D'Arcy	11.8	6,561	6,786	6,876	6,998	7,256	7,290	11,046	
Fianna Fáil	Denis Asple	10.5	6,038	6,070	6,152	6,281	6,430	6,456	7,183	7,958
Fine Gael	Avril Doyle	8.8	4,896	5,196	5,251	5,418	6,168	6,294		
Democratic Left	Michael Enright	2.6	1,454	1,484	1,513	1,798				
Green	Marie Percival	1.7	938	957	1,105					
Independent	Michael O'Connor	1.1	616	622						
Electorate: 83,775 Valid: 55,686 Spoilt: 678 (1.2%) Quota: 9,282 Turnout: 56,364 (67.3%)

=== 1992 general election ===
1992 general election: Wexford
Party	Candidate	FPv%	Count							
Party	Candidate	FPv%	1	2	3	4	5	6	7	8
Labour	Brendan Howlin	19.8	10,338							
Fianna Fáil	John Browne	16.1	8,407	8,502	8,572	8,662	9,233			
Fianna Fáil	Hugh Byrne	14.0	7,299	7,384	7,426	7,534	7,780	7,915	8,145	8,423
Fine Gael	Ivan Yates	13.5	7,043	7,371	7,403	7,673	10,716			
Fianna Fáil	Séamus Cullimore	12.3	6,436	6,622	6,696	7,105	7,351	7,460	7,581	7,783
Fine Gael	Michael D'Arcy	10.8	5,626	5,757	5,805	5,936				
Fine Gael	Avril Doyle	10.2	5,314	5,673	5,680	6,045	7,527	9,303		
Democratic Left	Michael Enright	1.5	797	1,195	1,244					
Independent	Michael O'Connor	1.0	502	533	582					
Sinn Féin	Oliver Murray	0.8	410	439						
Electorate: 75,886 Valid: 52,172 Spoilt: 765 (1.5%) Quota: 8,696 Turnout: 52,937 (69.8%)

=== 1989 general election ===
1989 general election: Wexford
Party	Candidate	FPv%	Count						
Party	Candidate	FPv%	1	2	3	4	5	6	7
Labour	Brendan Howlin	18.0	9,253						
Fine Gael	Ivan Yates	14.0	7,161	7,280	7,734	7,872	7,885	10,734	
Fianna Fáil	John Browne	13.6	6,983	7,016	7,094	9,640			
Fianna Fáil	Séamus Cullimore	13.4	6,893	6,999	7,291	7,845	8,010	8,552	8,730
Fine Gael	Michael D'Arcy	10.1	5,161	5,211	5,428	5,973	6,011	7,339	9,282
Fianna Fáil	Hugh Byrne	10.0	5,128	5,155	5,230	5,859	6,726	6,858	6,918
Fine Gael	Avril Doyle	9.0	4,596	4,730	5,061	5,109	5,113		
Fianna Fáil	Lorcan Allen	8.7	4,489	4,497	4,561				
Workers' Party	Michael Enright	2.0	1,049	1,251					
Progressive Democrats	William Willoughby	1.2	599	620					
Electorate: 70,424 Valid: 51,312 Quota: 8,553 Turnout: 72.9%

=== 1987 general election ===
1987 general election: Wexford
Party	Candidate	FPv%	Count										
Party	Candidate	FPv%	1	2	3	4	5	6	7	8	9	10	11
Fianna Fáil	John Browne	17.9	9,457										
Fianna Fáil	Hugh Byrne	14.3	7,551	7,551	7,847	7,958	8,224	8,335	9,037				
Fianna Fáil	Lorcan Allen	11.8	6,225	6,230	6,446	6,517	6,696	6,791	6,938	7,484	7,594	7,725	7,873
Fine Gael	Ivan Yates	11.4	6,018	6,022	6,070	6,109	6,183	6,434	7,454	10,514			
Fine Gael	Avril Doyle	10.4	5,518	5,519	5,528	5,638	6,020	6,138	6,845	8,480	8,538	9,903	
Fine Gael	Michael D'Arcy	9.9	5,247	5,251	5,262	5,285	5,329	5,529	6,062				
Labour	Brendan Howlin	9.6	5,086	5,092	5,117	5,617	6,437	6,581	7,074	7,505	7,553	7,750	8,223
Progressive Democrats	Eoin Minihan	5.0	2,630	2,634	2,640	2,697	2,770	4,001					
Progressive Democrats	Gerald Doyle	3.9	2,078	2,079	2,089	2,128	2,206						
Independent	Padge Reck	3.5	1,829	1,833	1,844	2,091							
Workers' Party	Michael Enright	2.4	1,250	1,251	1,255								
Independent	Jim Tallon	0.1	33										
Electorate: 69,658 Valid: 52,922 Quota: 8,821 Turnout: 75.9%

=== November 1982 general election ===
November 1982 general election: Wexford
Party	Candidate	FPv%	Count							
Party	Candidate	FPv%	1	2	3	4	5	6	7	8
Fine Gael	Michael D'Arcy	15.8	7,943	7,982	8,036	8,156	9,191			
Fine Gael	Ivan Yates	14.2	7,166	7,191	7,272	7,345	8,799			
Fianna Fáil	Hugh Byrne	12.9	6,492	6,507	6,591	8,337	8,758			
Fianna Fáil	Lorcan Allen	11.9	5,976	5,987	6,021	7,053	7,216	7,255	7,317	7,382
Fianna Fáil	John Browne	11.7	5,891	5,898	5,946	7,303	7,536	7,584	7,927	8,126
Fine Gael	Avril Doyle	11.4	5,753	5,813	5,873	6,160	8,035	8,710		
Labour	Brendan Howlin	9.9	4,962	5,050	5,439	5,481				
Fianna Fáil	Gus Byrne	9.7	4,895	4,956	5,097					
Workers' Party	John Roche	1.8	920	965						
Independent	James Hayes	0.7	363							
Electorate: 66,406 Valid: 50,361 Quota: 8,394 Turnout: 75.8%

=== February 1982 general election ===
February 1982 general election: Wexford
Party	Candidate	FPv%	Count								
Party	Candidate	FPv%	1	2	3	4	5	6	7	8	9
Fine Gael	Michael D'Arcy	18.0	8,787								
Fine Gael	Ivan Yates	16.4	8,005	8,390							
Fianna Fáil	Hugh Byrne	13.9	6,772	6,782	6,796	6,902	6,909	7,086	7,338	9,110	
Fianna Fáil	Lorcan Allen	12.1	5,902	5,934	5,940	5,954	5,959	6,091	6,137	7,250	8,134
Fianna Fáil	Seán Browne	12.0	5,863	5,873	5,903	5,919	5,922	6,299	6,359	8,194	
Fianna Fáil	Gus Byrne	10.6	5,184	5,194	5,316	5,341	5,343	5,532	5,618		
Labour	Desmond Corish	7.6	3,692	3,727	3,797	4,440	4,462	4,773	6,155	6,746	6,836
Independent	Seán Doyle	3.3	1,622	1,631	1,681	1,709	1,711				
Fine Gael	Louise Hennessy	3.3	1,590	1,736	1,807	1,960	2,173	2,334			
Labour	William Moroney	2.1	1,002	1,009	1,022						
Independent	James Hayes	0.8	396	403							
Electorate: 64,713 Valid: 48,815 Quota: 8,136 Turnout: 75.4%

=== 1981 general election ===
1981 general election: Wexford
Party	Candidate	FPv%	Count								
Party	Candidate	FPv%	1	2	3	4	5	6	7	8	9
Fine Gael	Michael D'Arcy	20.7	10,290								
Fianna Fáil	Lorcan Allen	15.0	7,465	7,567	7,592	7,620	7,632	7,675	8,631		
Fianna Fáil	Hugh Byrne	12.8	6,353	6,394	6,411	6,450	6,574	6,822	7,945	8,011	8,083
Fianna Fáil	Seán Browne	11.8	5,859	5,898	5,922	5,961	5,988	6,038	7,790	7,822	8,064
Fine Gael	Ivan Yates	11.1	5,522	6,436	6,483	6,547	6,633	8,850			
Labour	Brendan Corish	10.6	5,265	5,396	5,499	5,624	6,666	7,106	7,697	8,145	8,158
Fianna Fáil	Gus Byrne	8.7	4,350	4,380	4,437	4,599	4,625	4,690			
Fine Gael	Louise Hennessy	4.4	2,210	2,856	2,893	3,010	3,269				
Labour	Denis North	3.1	1,523	1,542	1,606	1,639					
Independent	James Hayes	1.1	536	589	648						
Socialist Labour	John Teehan	0.9	447	458							
Electorate: 64,713 Valid: 49,820 Quota: 8,304 Turnout: 77.0%

=== 1977 general election ===
1977 general election: Wexford
Party	Candidate	FPv%	Count					
Party	Candidate	FPv%	1	2	3	4	5	6
Fianna Fáil	Seán Browne	19.7	8,701	8,782	8,875			
Labour	Brendan Corish	17.8	7,886	8,695	10,316			
Fianna Fáil	Lorcan Allen	17.5	7,733	7,745	7,799	7,841	7,963	8,101
Fianna Fáil	Séamus Whelan	11.6	5,139	5,163	5,413	5,578	5,638	5,753
Fine Gael	Michael D'Arcy	10.3	4,541	4,614	4,691	4,887	6,611	11,173
Fine Gael	John Esmonde	9.4	4,142	4,198	4,316	4,600	5,494	
Fine Gael	Pat Codd	6.1	2,681	2,716	2,768	2,989		
Labour	Denis North	4.6	2,036	2,322				
Labour	William Rossiter	3.2	1,406					
Electorate: 57,460 Valid: 44,265 Quota: 8,854 Turnout: 77.0%

=== 1973 general election ===
1973 general election: Wexford
Party	Candidate	FPv%	Count				
Party	Candidate	FPv%	1	2	3	4	5
Labour	Brendan Corish	20.8	7,863				
Fianna Fáil	Seán Browne	16.6	6,289	6,347	6,531	8,928	
Fianna Fáil	Lorcan Allen	15.8	5,978	6,024	6,070	6,989	8,320
Fine Gael	John Esmonde	13.4	5,074	5,940	7,362	7,500	7,515
Fine Gael	Michael D'Arcy	11.9	4,487	4,955	5,693	5,758	5,770
Fianna Fáil	Seán O'Gorman	9.2	3,487	3,605	3,684		
Labour	Andrew Doyle	7.4	2,781	3,066			
Fine Gael	Patrick Ronan	5.0	1,887				
Electorate: 49,881 Valid: 37,846 Quota: 7,570 Turnout: 75.9%

=== 1969 general election ===
1969 general election: Wexford
Party	Candidate	FPv%	Count							
Party	Candidate	FPv%	1	2	3	4	5	6	7	8
Labour	Brendan Corish	18.5	6,939	7,282	7,666					
Fianna Fáil	Lorcan Allen	17.7	6,632	6,683	6,705	6,820	6,847	7,015	7,019	8,724
Fine Gael	Anthony Esmonde	17.0	6,380	6,419	6,451	6,634	7,596			
Fianna Fáil	Seán Browne	11.6	4,354	4,377	4,402	4,490	4,512	4,610	4,615	6,548
Fianna Fáil	Seán O'Gorman	9.9	3,730	3,751	3,794	3,860	3,922	4,083	4,086	
Labour	Andrew Doyle	8.3	3,115	3,144	3,327	3,602	3,651	4,336	4,487	4,572
Fine Gael	James Jenkins	5.9	2,229	2,330	2,341	2,443	2,959			
Fine Gael	Michael Hart	4.3	1,601	1,614	1,682	1,715				
Independent	Leo Carthy	2.4	900	1,012	1,034					
Labour	Patrick McDonald	2.2	817	841						
Independent	James Mahoney	2.2	813							
Electorate: 48,799 Valid: 37,510 Quota: 7,503 Turnout: 76.9%

=== 1965 general election ===
1965 general election: Wexford
Party	Candidate	FPv%	Count				
Party	Candidate	FPv%	1	2	3	4	5
Labour	Brendan Corish	25.4	9,014				
Fine Gael	Anthony Esmonde	17.0	6,042	6,209	9,314		
Fianna Fáil	Lorcan Allen	15.1	5,362	5,422	5,482	5,623	7,350
Fianna Fáil	James Kennedy	14.8	5,269	5,333	5,440	5,645	7,410
Fianna Fáil	Seán Browne	11.1	3,935	3,984	4,029	4,120	
Fine Gael	Billy Rackard	9.7	3,450	3,530			
Labour	Martin Dunbar	6.9	2,443	3,933	4,073	5,125	5,447
Electorate: 46,616 Valid: 35,515 Quota: 7,104 Turnout: 76.2%

=== 1961 general election ===
1961 general election: Wexford
Party	Candidate	FPv%	Count					
Party	Candidate	FPv%	1	2	3	4	5	6
Labour	Brendan Corish	28.8	9,834					
Fine Gael	Anthony Esmonde	20.8	7,081					
Fianna Fáil	Lorcan Allen	15.3	5,221	5,561	5,571	5,772	5,959	6,182
Fianna Fáil	James Ryan	15.2	5,170	5,540	5,545	5,630	5,802	6,117
Fianna Fáil	Seán Browne	9.5	3,226	3,502	3,505	3,550	3,783	3,986
Fine Gael	William Esmonde	4.1	1,405	2,609	2,842	3,268	3,722	
Sinn Féin	Morgan Dunne	3.8	1,304	1,954	1,957	2,029		
Independent	Thaddeus O'Loughlin	2.5	855	1,029	1,036			
Electorate: 46,696 Valid: 34,096 Quota: 6,820 Turnout: 73.0%

=== 1957 general election ===
1957 general election: Wexford
Party	Candidate	FPv%	Count						
Party	Candidate	FPv%	1	2	3	4	5	6	7
Fianna Fáil	Denis Allen	18.8	7,112						
Labour	Brendan Corish	16.4	6,205	6,244	6,360				
Fianna Fáil	James Ryan	16.0	6,055	6,269	6,363				
Fianna Fáil	Seán Browne	15.3	5,788	6,270	6,311	6,336			
Fine Gael	Anthony Esmonde	14.9	5,650	5,682	6,022	6,036	6,059	6,072	7,146
Labour	John O'Leary	13.4	5,086	5,105	5,174	5,178	5,197	5,200	5,334
Fine Gael	Michael Fardy	3.3	1,236	1,241	1,310	1,314	1,316	1,318	
Independent	Eoin O'Mahony	2.0	759	764					
Electorate: 51,893 Valid: 37,891 Quota: 6,316 Turnout: 73.0%

=== 1954 general election ===
1954 general election: Wexford
Party	Candidate	FPv%	Count				
Party	Candidate	FPv%	1	2	3	4	5
Fianna Fáil	James Ryan	17.3	7,214				
Labour	Brendan Corish	16.8	7,001				
Fine Gael	Anthony Esmonde	15.0	6,247	6,954			
Fianna Fáil	Denis Allen	14.8	6,173	6,221	6,379	6,381	9,870
Labour	John O'Leary	14.8	6,150	6,283	6,294	6,352	6,566
Fianna Fáil	Seán Browne	9.2	3,834	3,879	3,981	3,982	
Fine Gael	James Bowe	8.4	3,510	4,047	4,052	4,054	4,137
Fine Gael	John Doran	3.6	1,498				
Electorate: 52,651 Valid: 41,627 Quota: 6,938 Turnout: 79.1%

=== 1951 general election ===
1951 general election: Wexford
Party	Candidate	FPv%	Count						
Party	Candidate	FPv%	1	2	3	4	5	6	7
Fianna Fáil	Denis Allen	17.5	7,352						
Fianna Fáil	James Ryan	15.3	6,440	6,479	6,558	6,673	6,724	10,101	
Labour	John O'Leary	14.7	6,179	6,458	7,040				
Labour	Brendan Corish	14.1	5,914	6,046	6,894	6,909	7,061		
Fine Gael	Anthony Esmonde	9.6	4,047	4,137	4,163	4,173	5,218	5,352	5,526
Fine Gael	James Bowe	9.2	3,852	3,935	3,951	3,990	4,798	4,913	5,088
Fianna Fáil	Seán Browne	9.1	3,827	3,871	3,899	4,057	4,090		
Fine Gael	James Galvin	4.9	2,060	2,123	2,148	2,151			
Labour	James Sinnott	3.7	1,561	1,643					
Clann na Poblachta	Séamus O'Neill	2.0	837						
Electorate: 54,180 Valid: 42,069 Quota: 7,012 Turnout: 77.6%

=== 1948 general election ===
1948 general election: Wexford
Party	Candidate	FPv%	Count										
Party	Candidate	FPv%	1	2	3	4	5	6	7	8	9	10	11
Fianna Fáil	Denis Allen	16.3	6,872	6,886	6,900	6,922	6,931	6,936	6,983	7,047			
Labour	Brendan Corish	15.6	6,590	6,625	6,685	7,147							
Fianna Fáil	James Ryan	14.4	6,103	6,122	6,126	6,130	6,151	6,153	6,191	6,267	6,344	6,370	8,960
Fine Gael	John Esmonde	14.1	5,968	6,039	6,232	6,270	6,315	6,327	6,446	7,213			
National Labour Party	John O'Leary	13.1	5,513	5,553	5,562	5,629	5,682	5,718	5,849	6,062	6,467	6,539	6,754
Fianna Fáil	Thomas O'Hanlon	7.1	3,008	3,025	3,028	3,038	3,048	3,050	3,080	3,143	3,274	3,298	
Fine Gael	James Bowe	4.3	1,799	1,813	1,884	1,897	1,906	1,907	1,921	2,057			
Clann na Poblachta	Patrick Carson	3.4	1,431	1,450	1,465	1,480	1,931	1,944	2,973	3,053	3,255	3,302	3,357
Independent	John Keating	3.1	1,314	1,464	1,475	1,494	1,517	1,527	1,555				
Clann na Poblachta	Séamus O'Neill	2.8	1,189	1,199	1,209	1,243	1,488	1,510					
Clann na Poblachta	Thomas Cullimore	2.0	862	872	905	911							
Labour	Martin Dunbar	1.6	674	676	713								
Fine Gael	William Corcoran	1.2	518	523									
Independent	Robert Murphy	1.0	418										
Electorate: 55,282 Valid: 42,259 Quota: 7,044 Turnout: 76.4%

=== 1945 by-election ===
Labour Party TD Richard Corish died on 19 July 1945. A by-election was held to fill the vacancy on 4 December 1945. The seat was won by the Labour Party candidate Brendan Corish, son of the deceased TD.

1945 by-election: Wexford
Party	Candidate	FPv%	Count
Party	Candidate	FPv%	1
Labour	Brendan Corish	50.2	16,263
Fianna Fáil	Robert Moran	36.5	11,816
Clann na Talmhan	Patrick Kinsella	9.4	3,051
Independent	Robert Murphy	3.9	1,250
Electorate: 59,369 Valid: 32,380 Quota: 16,191 Turnout: 54.5%

=== 1944 general election ===
1944 general election: Wexford
Party	Candidate	FPv%	Count					
Party	Candidate	FPv%	1	2	3	4	5	6
Fianna Fáil	James Ryan	18.5	8,005					
Fianna Fáil	Denis Allen	17.7	7,644					
National Labour Party	John O'Leary	15.9	6,864	6,906	7,021	7,542		
Fine Gael	John Keating	13.8	5,937	5,959	5,979	6,049	6,255	6,332
Fine Gael	John Esmonde	12.4	5,337	5,349	5,359	5,433	5,519	5,659
Labour	Richard Corish	11.9	5,118	5,155	5,473	5,804	6,283	6,517
Fianna Fáil	Robert Moran	5.9	2,543	3,229	3,245	3,373		
National Labour Party	Thomas Byrne	2.7	1,173	1,183	1,212			
Labour	James Kelly	1.2	536	539				
Electorate: 60,627 Valid: 43,157 Quota: 7,193 Turnout: 71.2%

=== 1943 general election ===
1943 general election: Wexford
Party	Candidate	FPv%	Count							
Party	Candidate	FPv%	1	2	3	4	5	6	7	8
Fianna Fáil	James Ryan	16.4	7,518	7,538	7,547	7,560	8,860			
Fianna Fáil	Denis Allen	15.9	7,320	7,358	7,369	7,483	9,118			
Labour	Richard Corish	15.2	6,986	8,205						
Fine Gael	John Esmonde	13.1	6,004	6,097	6,111	8,041				
Fine Gael	John Keating	9.8	4,502	4,594	4,613	5,620	5,748	6,133	6,258	6,315
Labour	John O'Leary	9.1	4,197	5,108	5,590	5,678	6,055	6,060	6,291	6,461
Fianna Fáil	Patrick Kehoe	7.7	3,554	3,592	3,604	3,663				
Fine Gael	James Bowe	7.3	3,362	3,382	3,389					
Labour	Christopher Culleton	5.4	2,458							
Electorate: 60,627 Valid: 45,901 Quota: 7,651 Turnout: 75.7%

=== 1938 general election ===
1938 general election: Wexford
Party	Candidate	FPv%	Count				
Party	Candidate	FPv%	1	2	3	4	5
Fianna Fáil	Denis Allen	20.7	9,647				
Fianna Fáil	James Ryan	19.7	9,214				
Labour	Richard Corish	19.6	9,162				
Fine Gael	John Keating	13.3	6,218	6,289	6,324	6,966	7,642
Fine Gael	John Esmonde	12.7	5,944	6,071	6,093	8,438	
Fianna Fáil	Robert Moran	7.2	3,368	4,855	6,204	6,271	6,971
Fine Gael	Edward Dundon	6.8	3,157	3,333	3,355		
Electorate: 60,819 Valid: 46,710 Quota: 7,786 Turnout: 76.8%

=== 1937 general election ===
1937 general election: Wexford
Party	Candidate	FPv%	Count			
Party	Candidate	FPv%	1	2	3	4
Fianna Fáil	Denis Allen	21.6	10,078			
Fianna Fáil	James Ryan	19.6	9,163			
Labour	Richard Corish	18.0	8,410			
Fine Gael	John Keating	13.1	6,142	6,238	6,274	7,794
Fine Gael	John Esmonde	12.7	5,932	6,081	6,108	8,850
Fine Gael	James Bowe	9.5	4,421	4,662	4,684	
Fianna Fáil	Thomas Redmond	5.5	2,594	4,395	5,682	5,737
Electorate: 61,486 Valid: 46,740 Quota: 7,791 Turnout: 76.0%

=== 1936 by-election ===
Fine Gael TD Osmond Esmonde died on 22 July 1936. A by-election was held to fill the vacancy on 17 August 1936, and the seat was won by the Fianna Fáil candidate Denis Allen.

1936 by-election: Wexford
Party	Candidate	FPv%	Count		
Party	Candidate	FPv%	1	2	3
Fianna Fáil	Denis Allen	51.0	23,263		
Fine Gael	John Esmonde	36.7	16,734	16,801	16,930
Labour	Michael Murphy	9.4	4,276	4,577	5,100
Cumann Poblachta na hÉireann	Stephen Hayes	2.9	1,301	1,408	
Electorate: 57,688 Valid: 45,574 Quota: 22,788 Turnout: 79.0%

=== 1933 general election ===
1933 general election: Wexford
Party	Candidate	FPv%	Count			
Party	Candidate	FPv%	1	2	3	4
Labour	Richard Corish	17.3	8,214			
Fianna Fáil	Patrick Kehoe	15.5	7,365	7,460	7,707	7,983
Fianna Fáil	James Ryan	14.4	6,818	6,882	7,015	7,089
Cumann na nGaedheal	John Keating	14.3	6,773	8,442		
Cumann na nGaedheal	Osmond Esmonde	13.3	6,305	7,192	10,136	
Fianna Fáil	Denis Allen	11.4	5,384	5,416	5,549	5,652
National Centre Party	Michael Doyle	7.6	3,606	3,760		
Cumann na nGaedheal	James Walsh	6.2	2,944			
Electorate: 57,227 Valid: 47,409 Quota: 7,902 Turnout: 82.8%

=== 1932 general election ===
1932 general election: Wexford
Party	Candidate	FPv%	Count						
Party	Candidate	FPv%	1	2	3	4	5	6	7
Fianna Fáil	James Ryan	18.1	7,813						
Fianna Fáil	Denis Allen	16.0	6,888	6,933	7,284				
Labour	Richard Corish	13.4	5,803	5,992	6,016	6,065	8,115		
Cumann na nGaedheal	Osmond Esmonde	12.4	5,364	5,385	5,388	6,359	6,488	7,848	
Fianna Fáil	Patrick Kehoe	9.8	4,229	4,264	4,473	4,578	4,989	5,340	5,897
Cumann na nGaedheal	John Keating	8.9	3,848	3,861	3,871	4,985	5,147	6,687	7,050
Independent	Michael Doyle	7.7	3,322	3,330	3,337	3,573	3,655		
Labour	James Shannon	6.3	2,715	2,954	2,966	3,084			
Cumann na nGaedheal	Michael Jordan	6.1	2,612	2,623	2,625				
Labour	John Noctor	1.3	574						
Electorate: 56,182 Valid: 43,168 Quota: 7,195 Turnout: 76.8%

=== September 1927 general election ===
September 1927 general election: Wexford
Party	Candidate	FPv%	Count			
Party	Candidate	FPv%	1	2	3	4
Fianna Fáil	Denis Allen	18.6	7,270			
Cumann na nGaedheal	Osmond Esmonde	16.2	6,362	6,370	6,595	
Fianna Fáil	James Ryan	15.3	5,987	6,553		
Labour	Richard Corish	12.7	4,989	5,083	5,976	6,238
Labour	James Shannon	11.6	4,546	4,572	4,945	5,015
Farmers' Party	Michael Jordan	10.1	3,944	3,957	4,271	7,426
Farmers' Party	Michael Doyle	8.7	3,407	3,425	3,940	
National League	John Keating	6.8	2,654	2,672		
Electorate: 57,252 Valid: 39,159 Quota: 6,527 Turnout: 68.4%

=== June 1927 general election ===
June 1927 general election: Wexford
Party	Candidate	FPv%	Count									
Party	Candidate	FPv%	1	2	3	4	5	6	7	8	9	10
Labour	Richard Corish	16.6	6,644	6,755								
Fianna Fáil	James Ryan	12.9	5,166	5,179	5,181	5,233	6,598	6,640	6,806			
Fianna Fáil	Denis Allen	10.1	4,059	4,064	4,065	4,078	4,378	4,515	4,586	4,691	4,831	4,912
Farmers' Party	Michael Doyle	10.0	4,022	4,051	4,056	4,281	4,327	4,515	5,489	8,692		
Labour	James Shannon	9.4	3,757	3,873	3,912	4,007	4,068	4,132	4,888	5,207	5,731	5,914
Farmers' Party	Michael Jordan	8.8	3,533	3,600	3,603	3,691	3,717	3,928	4,400			
National League	John Keating	8.5	3,402	3,424	3,425	3,571	3,622	5,611	6,149	6,486	7,448	
National League	Patrick Fanning	6.7	2,667	2,676	2,677	2,756	2,777					
Fianna Fáil	John Roche	4.9	1,965	1,980	1,981	2,009						
Cumann na nGaedheal	James Stafford	4.3	1,733	1,941	1,946							
Cumann na nGaedheal	Seán O'Kennedy	4.2	1,673	2,471	2,495	3,644	3,737	3,802				
Cumann na nGaedheal	Thomas McCarthy	3.5	1,411									
Electorate: 57,252 Valid: 40,032 Quota: 6,673 Turnout: 69.9%

=== 1923 general election ===
1923 general election: Wexford
Party	Candidate	FPv%	Count									
Party	Candidate	FPv%	1	2	3	4	5	6	7	8	9	10
Labour	Richard Corish	20.3	7,744									
Farmers' Party	Michael Doyle	18.8	7,176									
Republican	Robert Lambert	17.7	6,750									
Cumann na nGaedheal	Osmond Esmonde	14.3	5,436	5,710	5,904	5,909	6,002	6,201	6,377			
Republican	James Ryan	9.3	3,557	3,605	3,614	3,972	3,987	4,024	4,274	4,324	4,445	4,654
Farmers' Party	Michael Jordan	5.2	1,977	2,017	2,606	2,614	2,670	2,735	2,811	3,302	3,387	
Labour	James Shannon	4.8	1,845	1,976	1,979	1,986	1,992	2,003	2,043	2,234	3,754	4,201
Cumann na nGaedheal	Thomas McCarthy	3.3	1,270	1,316	1,325	1,328	1,365	1,393	1,418			
Labour	Daniel O'Callaghan	2.3	863	1,596	1,602	1,612	1,630	1,677	1,741	2,131		
Independent	John Cummins	1.6	625	702	710	719	736	850				
Independent	Ralph Brereton-Barry	1.3	500	526	530	532	608					
Independent	Hector Hughes	0.9	329	352	360	362						
Electorate: 60,171 Valid: 38,072 Quota: 6,346 Turnout: 63.3%

=== 1922 general election ===
1922 general election: Wexford
Party	Candidate	FPv%	Count						
Party	Candidate	FPv%	1	2	3	4	5	6	7
Labour	Richard Corish	35.5	11,692						
Farmers' Party	Michael Doyle	19.0	6,263	6,688					
Sinn Féin (Anti-Treaty)	James Ryan	11.8	3,879	4,064	4,101	4,508	5,851	5,935	5,960
Sinn Féin (Anti-Treaty)	Séamus Doyle	8.6	2,819	3,061	3,200	4,550	5,920	5,984	6,054
Sinn Féin (Pro-Treaty)	John O'Byrne	7.2	2,370	2,568	2,965	3,293			
Labour	Daniel O'Callaghan	6.8	2,229	6,026	6,205	6,360	6,741		
Sinn Féin (Anti-Treaty)	Seán Etchingham	6.6	2,185	2,362	2,398				
Farmers' Party	Michael Jordan	4.6	1,524	1,599					
Electorate: 49,058 Valid: 32,961 Quota: 6,593 Turnout: 67.2%

=== 1921 general election ===
1921 general election: Wexford (uncontested)
Party	Candidate
Sinn Féin	Richard Corish
Sinn Féin	Séamus Doyle
Sinn Féin	Seán Etchingham
Sinn Féin	James Ryan

== See also ==
- Elections in the Republic of Ireland
- Politics of the Republic of Ireland
- List of Dáil by-elections
- List of political parties in the Republic of Ireland
