= Matthias van Lierop =

Dominican writer (died 1621)

Matthias van Lierop (died 1621), Latinized Liropius, was a Dominican writer from the Low Countries.

== Life ==
Van Lierop was born near Helmond in the Duchy of Brabant and joined the Dominican Order in 's-Hertogenbosch. He was sent to study at Leuven University and went on to become subprior, lecturer in theology, prior, preacher, and provincial definitor. In 1573, during the Dutch Revolt, he was serving at the parish of Poppel when he was abducted by rebels and held captive at Geertruidenberg for six months. The commandant at Geertruidenberg, Jeronimus Tseraerts, initially refused to release Van Lierop in a prisoner exchange, threatening to hang him summarily instead. After Tseraerts's death at the hands of mutineers, Van Lierop was released unharmed. He returned to 's-Hertogenbosch, where he eventually died on 10 March 1621.

== Writings ==
Two of Van Lierop's works survived in manuscript:

- Destructio Babylonis, seu tractatus de vitiis
- Sermones de tempore et de sanctis
