= Jackie Groenen =

Dutch footballer (born 1994)

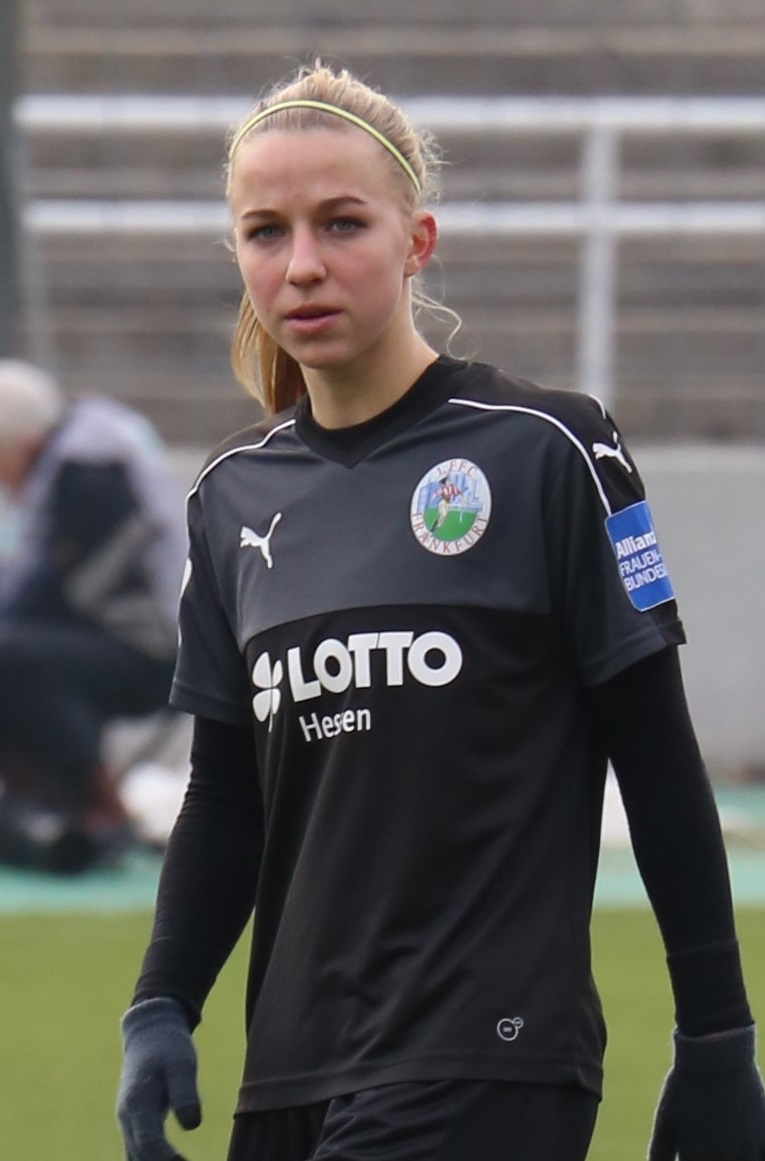
- Groenen with 1. FFC Frankfurt in 2016

Personal information
- Full name: Jackie Noëlle Groenen
- Date of birth: 17 December 1994 (age 31)
- Place of birth: Poppel, Belgium
- Height: 1.65 m (5 ft 5 in)
- Position: Midfielder

Team information
- Current team: Paris Saint-Germain
- Number: 14

Youth career
- GSBW
- VV Riel
- Wilhelmina Boys
- SV Rood-Wit Veldhoven

Senior career*
Years	Team	Apps	(Gls)
2011	SGS Essen	6	(0)
2011–2014	FCR 2001 Duisburg	32	(4)
2014–2015	Chelsea	20	(2)
2015–2019	1. FFC Frankfurt	79	(13)
2019–2022	Manchester United	50	(0)
2022–	Paris Saint-Germain	72	(5)

International career^{‡}
2009	Netherlands U15	3	(0)
2009–2010	Netherlands U17	5	(0)
2012	Netherlands U19	1	(0)
2016–	Netherlands	133	(10)
Medal record
Women's football
Representing the Netherlands
FIFA Women's World Cup
Runner-up	2019 France
UEFA Women's Championship
Winner	2017 Netherlands
- * Club domestic league appearances and goals as of 14 November 2026 ‡ National team caps and goals as of 5 June 2026

Jackie Noëlle Groenen (born 17 December 1994) is a Dutch professional footballer who plays as a midfielder for Première Ligue club Paris Saint-Germain and the Netherlands national team. She is a former judoka who won multiple Dutch national titles at youth level.

Groenen previously played for German clubs SGS Essen, FCR 2001 Duisburg and FFC Frankfurt, as well as for Chelsea and Manchester United in England. She was born in the Netherlands but grew up just over the Belgian border in Poppel. In 2014, FIFA ruled her ineligible to switch allegiance to Belgium, as she did not hold a Belgian passport when she played for the Netherlands at youth level.

== Club career ==
=== Early career ===
Groenen and her sister, Merel, began playing football at Goirlese Sportvereniging Blauw-Wit. After VV Riel and Wilhelmina Boys, they moved to SV Rood-Wit Veldhoven. The sisters continued their football career in the Frauen-Bundesliga and became players for SGS Essen. Groenen made her debut for SGS Essen in the DFB-Pokal Cup on 30 January 2011 against Turbine Potsdam.

=== FCR 2001 Duisburg ===
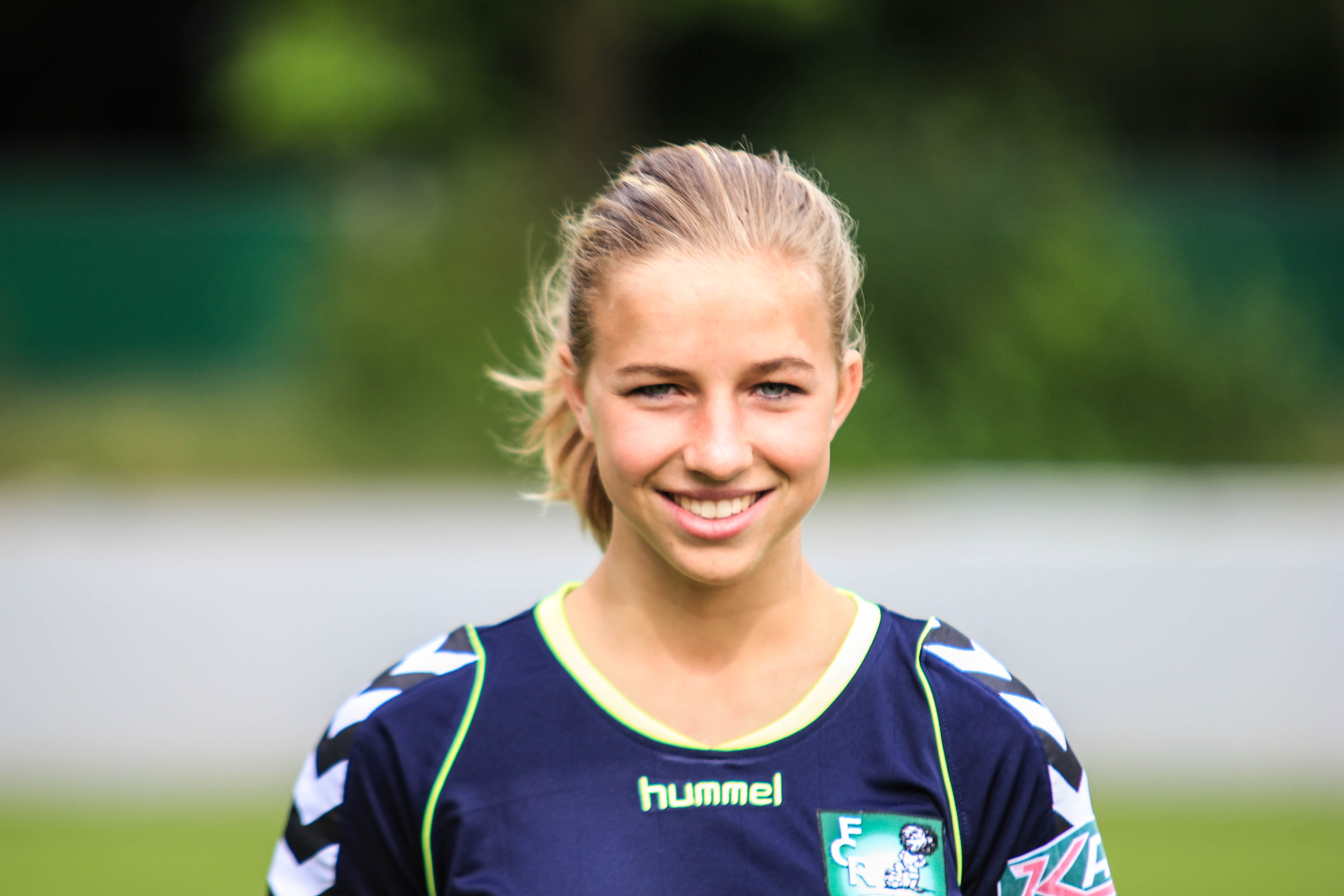
Groenen during her time at FCR 2001 Duisburg.

Groenen played for FCR 2001 Duisburg from 2011, until their insolvency at the end of 2013. On 7 May 2011, Groenen made her debut for the club against USV Jena in the Bundesliga Cup, scoring the third goal in a 4–1 win. She made her league debut on 28 August 2011 in a 2–0 win over Hamburger SV.

=== Chelsea ===
In February 2014, Groenen signed for Chelsea. On 17 April, she made her FA WSL debut in a 2–0 win over Bristol City. On 13 July, Groenen scored her first goals, netting twice in a 13–0 victory against London Bees in the FA WSL Continental Cup.

=== FFC Frankfurt ===
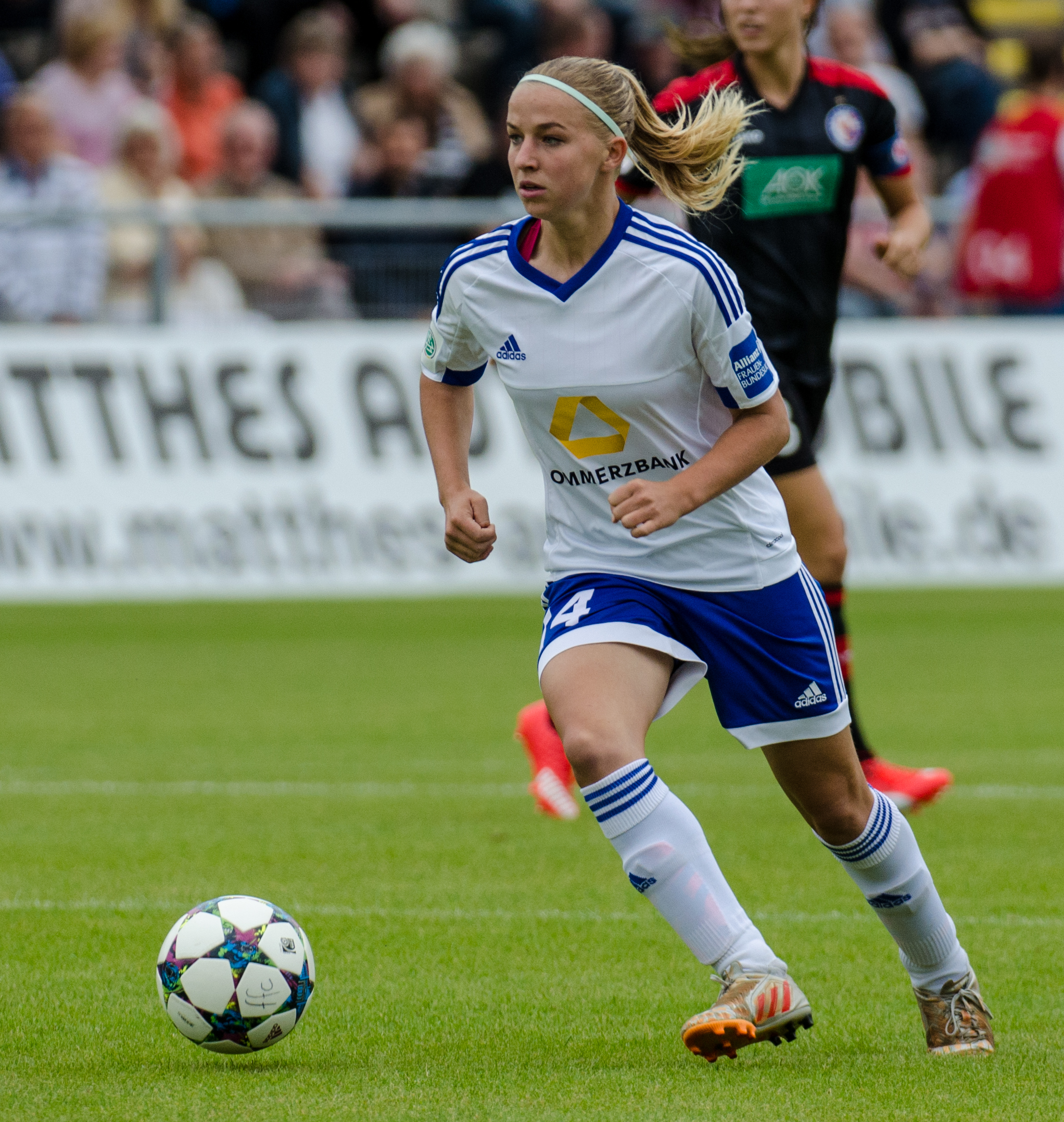
Groenen playing for FFC Frankfurt in 2015.

She returned to Germany and signed for FFC Frankfurt in June 2015. On 5 September, Groenen made her debut for the club in a 1–0 win against 1899 Hoffenheim.

=== Manchester United ===
On 22 May 2019, it was announced Groenen had signed a contract with Manchester United ahead of the 2019–20 season. In doing so, she became the team's first overseas signing with the team having formed a year earlier consisting of all British players. Groenen made her debut for Manchester United against Manchester City in the FA WSL on 7 September 2019, a 1–0 loss in the inaugural Manchester derby.

=== Paris Saint-Germain ===
On 15 September 2022, French club Paris Saint-Germain announced the signing of Groenen on a three-year deal until June 2025.

== International career ==
FIFA blocked Groenen's attempts to switch to representing Belgium because she did not have a Belgian passport when she played for the Netherlands' youth teams. She later indicated her willingness to play for the Netherlands again.

In January 2016, Groenen was called up to the Netherlands senior squad for the team's winter training camp in Turkey. She appeared in two friendly matches against Denmark to collect her first senior caps on 22 January 2016.

Groenen was part of the Dutch team that won the UEFA Women's Euro 2017. She played in all matches and was named in the 2017 UEFA Team of the Tournament.

After the tournament, the whole team was honoured by the Prime Minister Mark Rutte and Minister of Sport Edith Schippers and made Knights of the Order of Orange-Nassau.

In February 2018, Groenen was selected for the Netherlands side that won the 2018 Algarve Cup. Due to the final between Netherlands and Sweden being cancelled, caused by heavy rain and adverse weather conditions, the Algarve Cup was awarded to both teams.

In April 2019, Groenen was selected for her first World Cup. She started every game at the tournament and scored the only goal in extra-time of the 1–0 semi-final victory over Sweden to help the team reach their first World Cup final. The Netherlands eventually lost the final to the United States.

On 31 May 2023, she was named as part of the Netherlands provisional squad for the 2023 FIFA Women's World Cup.

== Judo ==
Groenen has won a series of championships in judo sports. In 2007, 2008 and 2009 she was Netherlands champion in the under 15 age group. She has won these titles in the weight class −32 kg. In 2010, she was vice champion in the weight class −44 kg. On 6 March 2010 she won the gold medal in the under 17 age group in Tilburg, Netherlands and on the European level at the European championships in June 2010 in Teplice she won the bronze medal of the under 17 age group, weight class −40 kg. In February 2011 Groenen won the Netherlands junior (under 20 age group) championships in the weight class −44 kg.

Groenen's judo career came to an end when she was 17. Her employers FCR 2001 Duisburg made clear their unhappiness when she broke her hip in a judo accident the day before a football match. Groenen admitted that she preferred football and would eventually have chosen to stop judo in any case.

== Personal life ==
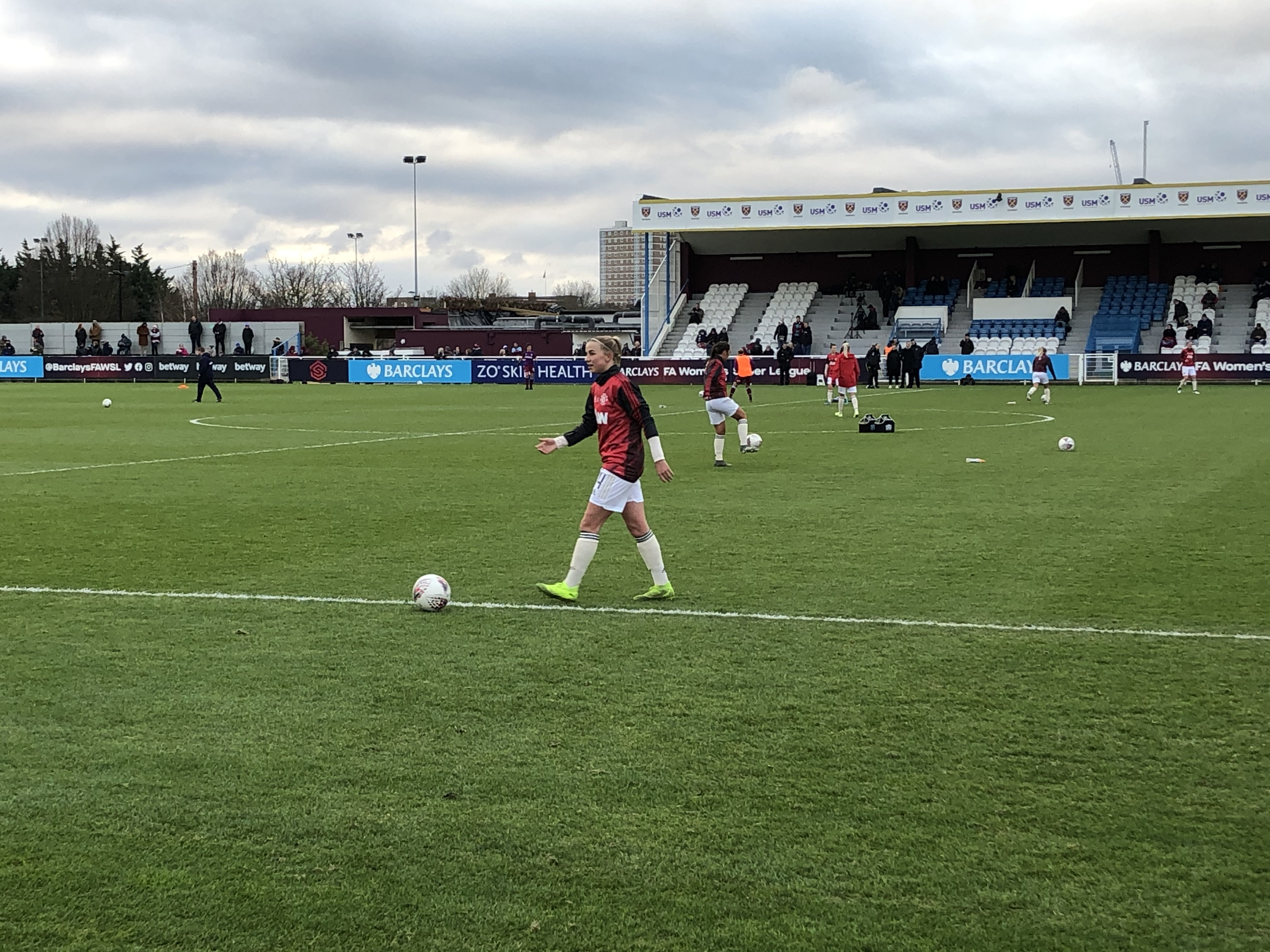
Groenen before a Manchester United match against West Ham United in 2019

While playing for Chelsea in London, Groenen was studying for a law degree at Tilburg University and the club would fly her to the Netherlands for her exams. Her older sister Merel used to play for Belgian women's football team Lierse SK.

== Career statistics ==
=== Club ===
As of match played 21 May 2024

Appearances and goals by club, season and competition
Club	Season	League			National cup (Note: Includes the DFB-Pokal Frauen, Women's FA Cup and Coupe de France féminine)		League cup (Note: Includes the Bundesliga Cup and WSL Cup/Women's League Cup)		Europe (Note: Includes the UEFA Women's Champions League)		Other (Note: Includes the Trophée des Championnes)		Total	
Club	Season	Division	Apps	Goals	Apps	Goals	Apps	Goals	Apps	Goals	Apps	Goals	Apps	Goals
SGS Essen	2010–11	Bundesliga	6	0	1	0	—		—		—		7	0
FCR 2001 Duisburg	2010–11	Bundesliga	0	0	0	0	2	1	—		—		2	1
FCR 2001 Duisburg	2011–12	Bundesliga	9	0	3	0	—		—		—		12	0
FCR 2001 Duisburg	2012–13	Bundesliga	16	2	1	0	—		—		—		17	2
FCR 2001 Duisburg	2013–14	Bundesliga	7	2	1	0	—		—		—		8	2
FCR 2001 Duisburg	Total		32	4	5	0	2	1	0	0	0	0	39	5
Chelsea	2014	WSL 1	14	2	3	0	5	2	—		—		22	4
Chelsea	2015	WSL 1	6	0	3	0	0	0	0	0	—		9	0
Chelsea	Total		20	2	6	0	5	2	0	0	0	0	31	4
FFC Frankfurt	2015–16	Bundesliga	21	1	2	1	—		8	0	—		31	2
FFC Frankfurt	2016–17	Bundesliga	22	4	2	1	—		—		—		24	5
FFC Frankfurt	2017–18	Bundesliga	20	6	3	1	—		—		—		23	7
FFC Frankfurt	2018–19	Bundesliga	16	2	2	0	—		—		—		18	2
FFC Frankfurt	Total		79	13	9	3	0	0	8	0	0	0	96	16
Manchester United	2019–20	WSL	12	0	1	0	3	0	—		—		16	0
Manchester United	2020–21	WSL	22	0	0	0	3	0	—		—		25	0
Manchester United	2021–22	WSL	16	0	2	0	1	0	—		—		19	0
Manchester United	Total		50	0	3	0	7	0	0	0	0	0	60	0
Paris Saint-Germain	2022–23	Première Ligue	17	2	4	0	—		8	0	—		29	2
Paris Saint-Germain	2023–24	Première Ligue	16	1	3	0	—		10	0	1	0	30	1
Paris Saint-Germain	2024–25	Première Ligue	0	0	0	0	—		0	0	0	0	0	0
Paris Saint-Germain	Total		33	3	7	0	0	0	18	0	1	0	59	3
Career total			220	21	31	3	14	3	26	0	1	0	292	28

=== International ===
As of match played 12 April 2022
Scores and results list the Netherlands' goal tally first, score column indicates score after each Groenen goal.

List of international goals scored by Jackie Groenen
No.	Date	Venue	Opponent	Score	Result	Competition	Ref.
1	20 October 2016	Tony Macaroni Arena, Livingston, Scotland	Scotland	7–0	7–0	Friendly	
2	8 June 2018	Shamrock Park, Portadown, Northern Ireland	Northern Ireland	5–0	5–0	2019 FIFA Women's World Cup qualification	
3	3 July 2019	Parc Olympique Lyonnais, Décines-Charpieu, France	Sweden	1–0	1–0	2019 FIFA Women's World Cup	
4	23 October 2020	Euroborg, Groningen, Netherlands	Estonia	3–0	7–0	UEFA Women's Euro 2021 qualifying	
5	23 October 2020	Euroborg, Groningen, Netherlands	Estonia	5–0	7–0	UEFA Women's Euro 2021 qualifying	
6	24 February 2021	De Koel, Venlo, Netherlands	Germany	1–0	2–1	Friendly	
7	13 April 2021	Goffertstadion, Nijmegen, Netherlands	Australia	3–0	5–0	Friendly	
8	21 September 2021	Laugardalsvöllur, Reykjavík, Iceland	Iceland	2–0	2–0	2023 FIFA World Cup qualifying	
9	12 April 2022	ADO Den Haag Stadium, The Hague, Netherlands	South Africa	1–0	5–1	Friendly	
10	4 April 2025	Erve Asito, Almelo, Netherlands	Austria	1–0	3–1	2025 UEFA Women's Nations League	

== Honours ==
Paris Saint-Germain

- Coupe de France Féminine: 2023–24

Netherlands

- FIFA Women's World Cup runner-up: 2019
- UEFA European Women's Championship: 2017

Individual

- UEFA European Women's Championship Team of the Tournament: 2017
- PFA Community Champion Award: 2019–20

Orders

- Knight of the Order of Orange-Nassau: 2017
