= 2024 Irish local elections =

Nationwide local authority elections

- 7 June 2024

949 County and City Council Seats
- Opinion polls
- Turnout: 49.4% ▼0.72pp
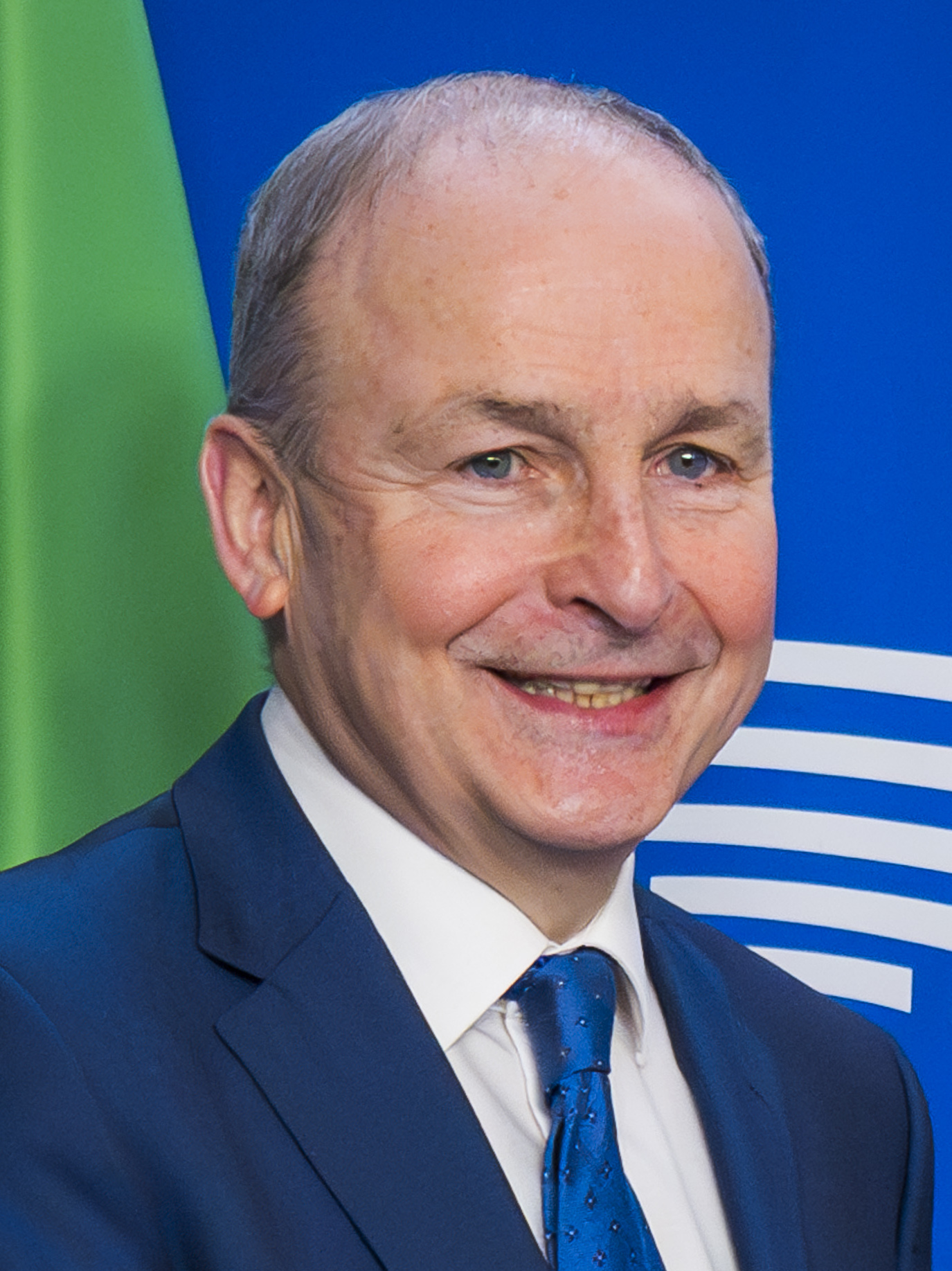

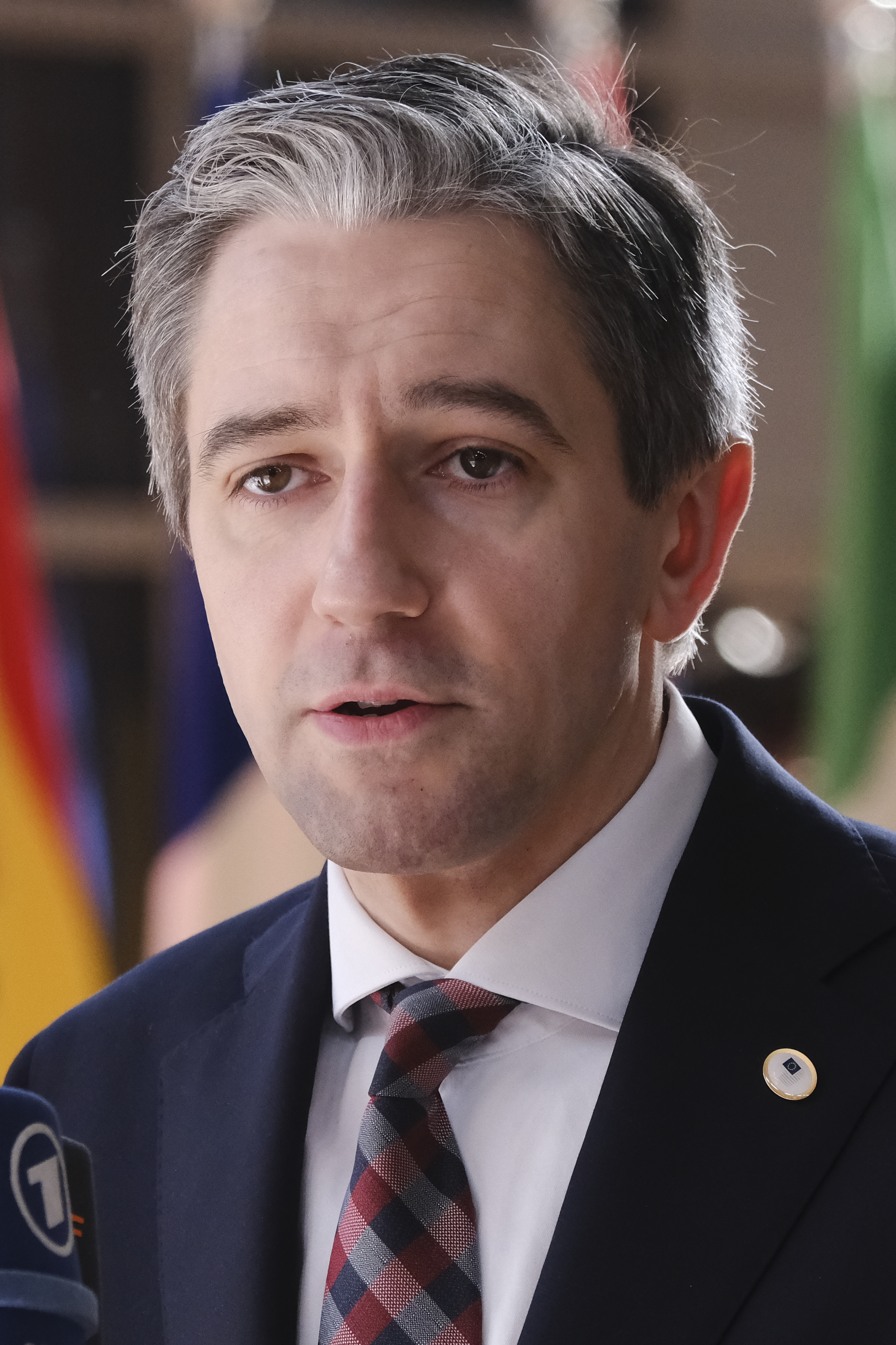

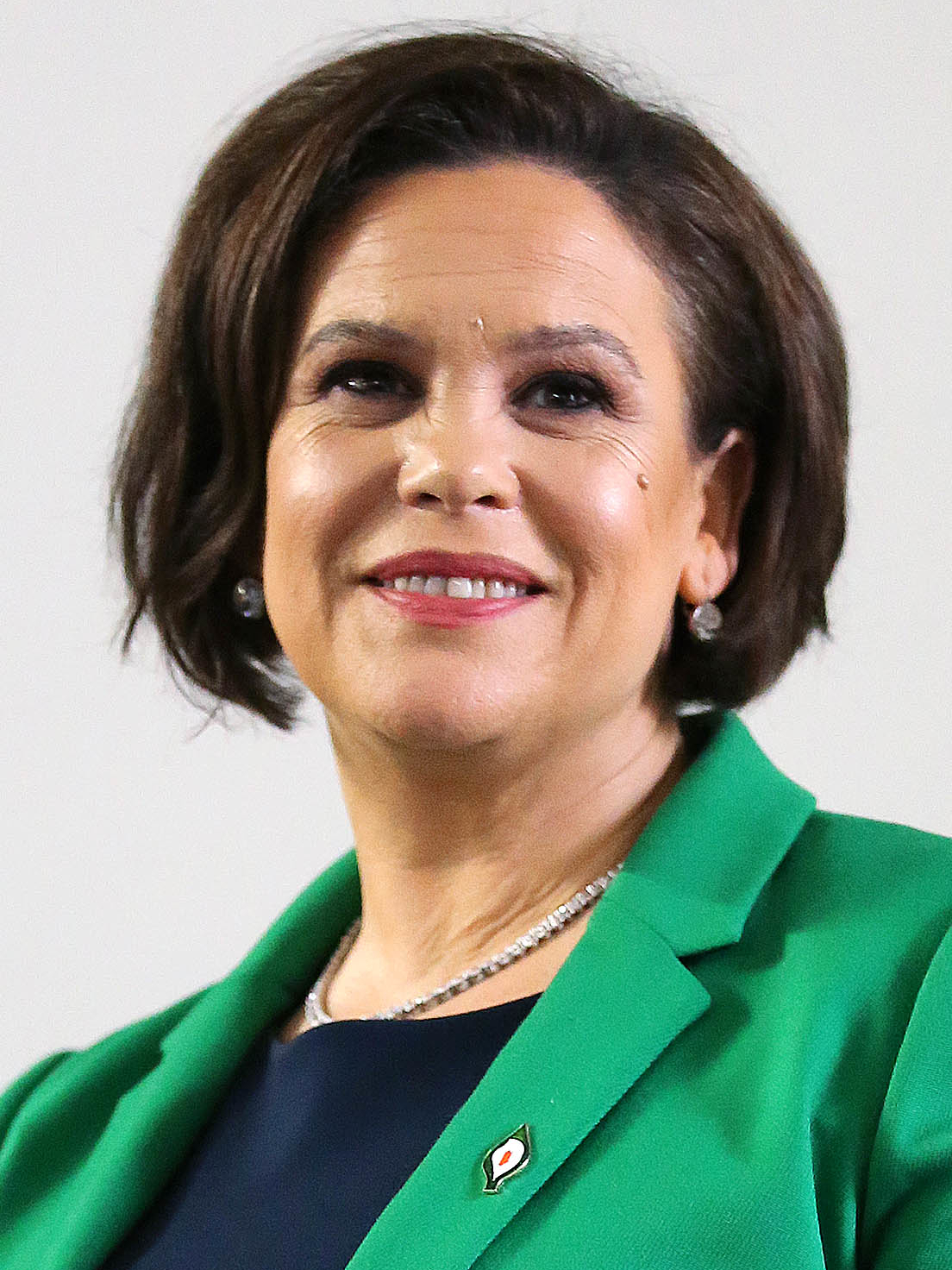

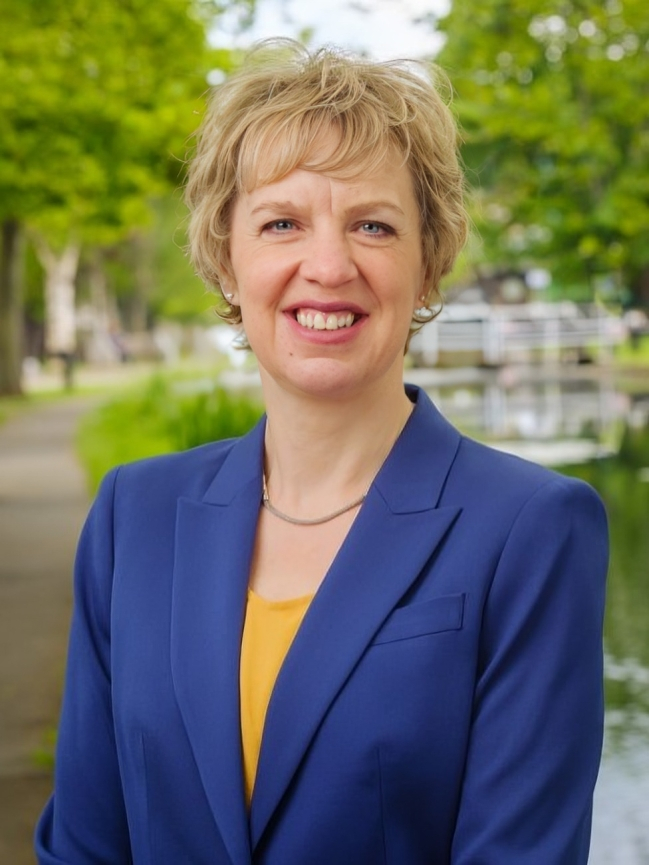

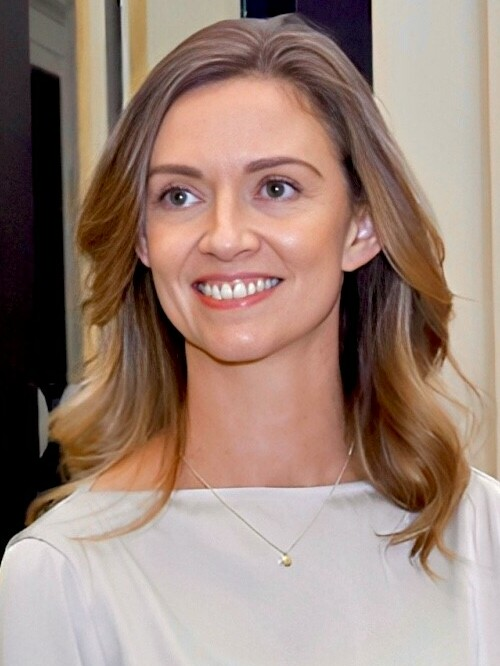

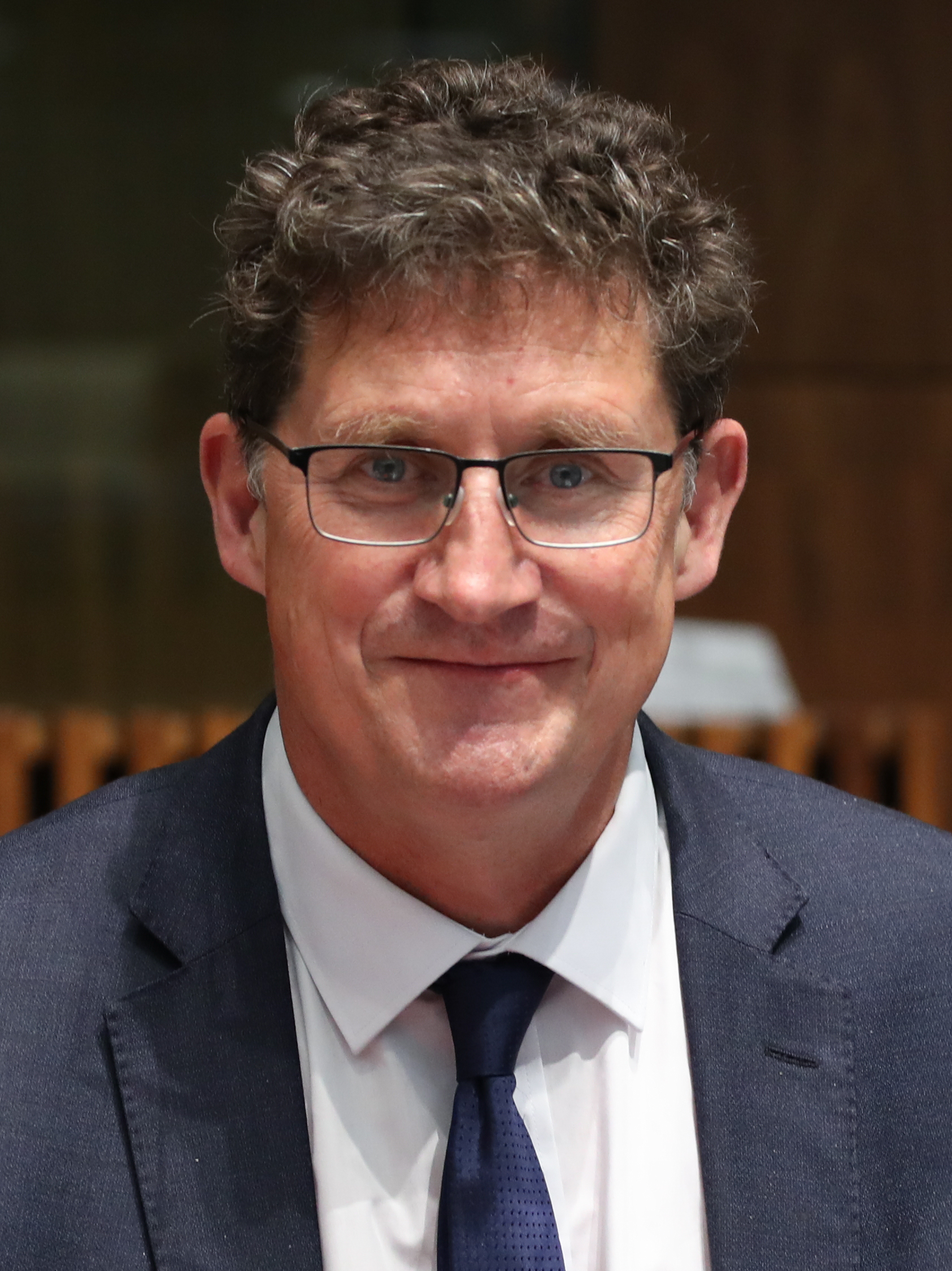

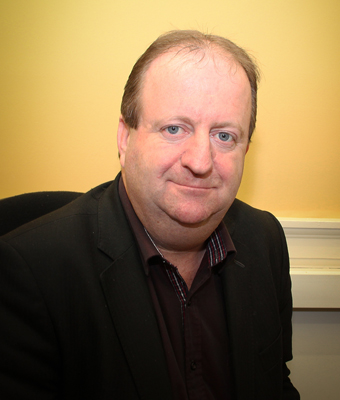

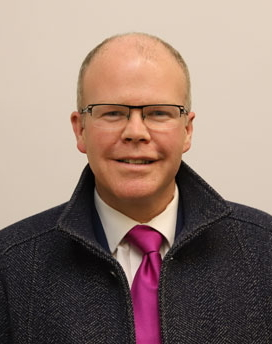
	First party	Second party	Third party
Leader	Micheál Martin	Simon Harris	Mary Lou McDonald
Party	Fianna Fáil	Fine Gael	Sinn Féin
Leader since	26 January 2011	24 March 2024	10 February 2018
Last election	279	255	81
Seats won	248	245	102
Seat change	▼31	▼10	▲21
Popular vote	421,462	421,873	218,620
Percentage	22.9%	23.0%	11.8%
Swing	▼4%	▼2.66%	▲2.32%
	Fourth party	Fifth party	Sixth party
Leader	Ivana Bacik	Holly Cairns	Eamon Ryan
Party	Labour	Social Democrats	Green
Leader since	24 March 2022	1 March 2023	27 May 2011
Last election	57	19	49
Seats won	56	35	23
Seat change	▼1	▲16	▼26
Popular vote	97,575	63,273	66,684
Percentage	5.29%	3.43%	3.62%
Swing	▼0.43%	▲1.15%	▼1.93%
	Seventh party	Eighth party	Ninth party
		PBP–S
Leader	Michael Collins	Collective leadership	Peadar Tóibín
Party	Independent Ireland	PBP–Solidarity	Aontú
Leader since	10 November 2023	N/A	28 January 2019
Last election	New party	11	3
Seats won	23	13	8
Seat change	N/A	▲2	▲5
Popular vote	51,562	27,183 (Sol 4,952) (PBP 22,231)	39,461
Percentage	2.80%	1.48% (Sol 0.27%) (PBP 1.21%)	2.14%
Swing	N/A	▼0.41% (Sol ▼0.36%) (PBP ▼0.06%)	▲0.66%
- Results by counties and cities

The 2024 Irish local elections were held in all local authorities in Ireland on Friday, 7 June 2024. European Parliament elections were held on the same day. It also included the 2024 Limerick mayoral election, for the first directly elected mayor in Ireland. Each local government area (a city, a county, or a city and county) is divided into local electoral areas (LEAs) where three to seven councillors are elected on the system of proportional representation by means of the single transferable vote (PR-STV). This year saw a record number of women standing for election, with 31.4% (682 out of 2,171 candidates) being female. 26.1% of those elected were women (248 out of 949), a small increase compared to the last elections. Voter turnout for the elections was 49.4%, the first time less than half of registered voters participated, slightly down from 50.2% in 2019.

== Election timetable ==
- 5 April: Ministerial order fixing the election date made by Darragh O'Brien, the Minister for Housing, Local Government and Heritage
- 8 May: Date on which posters may be erected
- 7 June: Polling day (7 a.m.–10 p.m.)

== Campaign ==
=== Violence and abuse against candidates ===
On 8 May, Fingal councillor Tania Doyle and her husband, while erecting election posters, were assaulted by a man shouting anti-immigration and anti-Muslim rhetoric while an accomplice filmed it. Her husband was left bleeding and knocked to the ground by the assault which also saw Doyle herself punched in the head after she attempted to shield her husband. The assault lasted 15 minutes and only ended when the accomplice pulled the assaulter away from kicking Doyle's husband while on the ground. Doyle stated she feared for their lives and going forward would not be canvassing for the remainder of the election. The gardaí have stated that they are investigating the matter.

Concurrently on 8 May, Dublin City Councillor Janet Horner of the Green Party and a colleague claim she was assaulted by a man who said "Dublin 1 is for the far-right". Horner was erecting election posters when she was reportedly confronted by a man who threatened to kill her. She said the man confiscated her posters and struck her when she resisted. Horner contacted the gardaí afterwards and resolved to continue to canvass despite the event.

In another incident on 8 May, two women placing posters up in the Smithfield area of Dublin for Social Democrats candidate Ellen O'Doherty were threatened with a knife by a man demanding they remove the posters, who was then joined by another man. The women managed to escape when a local woman came from a nearby house and begged the men to stop. The campaigners reported the incident to the gardaí and said they would not canvass in future nor return to the area.

On 15 May Fianna Fáil candidate Suzzie O'Deniyi was canvassing with members of her team in the Caherdavin area of Limerick when a man is alleged to have begun screaming racist and sexist slurs about O'Deniyi at her supporters. The man recorded himself doing so on his phone. Aaron Daly of Caherdavin, was subsequently arrested by Gardaí, and was charged with two counts of using threatening, abusive or insulting words or behaviour, contrary to section 6 of the Criminal Justice (Public Order) Act 1994, before being released on bail. Daly was ordered to have no contact of any kind with O'Deniyi and to report to gardaí regularly until his trial, which was scheduled for 6 September 2024. Aaron Daly failed to appear in court when his case was called on 6 September 2024 and it was later reported that he had fled to the Greek island of Crete. A bench warrant for his arrest was issued.

On 17 May, Fine Gael candidate in Artane–Whitehall Linkwinstar Mattathil Mathew and his campaign team were forced to take down election posters after they were racially abused and intimidated by a group of men. The perpetrators filmed the incident and posted it to social media.

On 16 May Tánaiste Micheál Martin denounced the targeting of candidates, noting that the large majority of those targeted were from minority backgrounds. Martin stated the right to run in elections was a pillar of liberal democracy, regardless of background.

== Standing of parties ==
Party	Councillors		
Party	2019 result	Seats at election day	Change
Fianna Fáil	279	276	▼3
Fine Gael	255	254	▼1
Sinn Féin	81	81	Steady
Labour	57	55	▼2
Green	49	45	▼4
Social Democrats	19	22	▲3
Independent Ireland	—N/a	13	▲13
PBP–Solidarity	11	10	▼1
Aontú	3	3	Steady
Inds. 4 Change	3	2	▼1
Right to Change	—N/a	2	▲2
Rabharta	—N/a	1	▲1
Kerry Ind. Alliance	1	1	Steady
Republican Sinn Féin	1	1	Steady
Workers' Party	1	1	Steady
Workers and Unemployed	1	1	Steady
Independent	185	181	▼4

== Results by party ==
Party	Candidates	Seats	± vs 2019	1st pref.	FPv%	±%
Fianna Fáil	366	248	▼31	421,462	22.87	▼4.05
Fine Gael	339	245	▼10	421,873	22.89	▼2.40
Sinn Féin	335	102	▲21	218,620	11.86	▲2.40
Labour	109	56	▼1	97,575	5.29	▼0.43
Social Democrats	77	35	▲16	63,273	3.43	▲1.15
Green	129	23	▼26	66,684	3.62	▼1.93
Independent Ireland	61	23	▲23 (Note: Founded in November 2023. Entered the election with 13 sitting councillors, of whom 11 were re-elected.)	51,562	2.80	New
People Before Profit (Note: Contesting as part of People Before Profit–Solidarity.)	45	10	▲3	22,231	1.21	▼0.06
Aontú	66	8	▲5	39,461	2.14	▲0.66
Wexford Ind. Alliance (Note: Not a registered party. Appeared on the ballot as non-party.)	12	5	▲5	10,223	0.55	New
100% Redress	6	4	▲4	7,400	0.40	New
Solidarity	8	3	▼1	4,952	0.27	▼0.36
Irish Freedom	28	1	▲1	9,500	0.52	New
National Party	15	1	▲1	4,983	0.27	New
Inds. 4 Change	2	1	▼2	3,537	0.19	▼0.33
Right to Change	2	1	▲1	2,639	0.14	New
Workers and Unemployed	2	1	Steady	1,887	0.10	▼0.05
Kerry Ind. Alliance	1	1	Steady	1,574	0.09	▼0.03
Independent Left	1	1	Steady	1,365	0.07	▼0.03
Republican Sinn Féin	1	1	Steady	974	0.05	▼0.01
The Irish People	57	0	New	13,134	0.71	New
Ireland First	8	0	New	3,165	0.17	New
Workers' Party	3	0	▼1	1,700	0.09	▼0.06
Rabharta (Note: Did not appear on the ballot as Rabharta. The Electoral Commission proposed the registration of the party to contest European and local elections on 12 April. However, as the proposed decision was subject to a 21-day appeal period, it was not in force for the 7 June 2024 elections.)	4	0	New (Note: Founded in June 2021. Entered the election with one sitting councillor, who was not re-elected.)	1,246	0.07	New
Glór	1	0	New	559	0.03	New
Party for Animal Welfare	5	0	New	457	0.02	New
Farmers' Alliance	2	0	New	355	0.02	New
Independent	488	178	▼7	370,714	20.11	▲0.65
Total	2,172	949	—N/a	1,843,105	—N/a	—N/a

== Results by council ==
Authority	FF	FG	SF	Lab	SD	GP	II	PBP	Aon	WIA	100%R	Sol	I4C	IF	NP	RTC	WUA	KIA	IL	RSF	Ind.	Total	Details
Carlow	5	6	2	1			1	1													2	18	Details
Cavan	6	6	3				1		1												1	18	Details
Clare	14	9	2																		3	28	Details
Cork	19	18	1	2	3		4														8	55	Details
Cork City	9	5	4	3	1	3	1					1									4	31	Details
Donegal	10	3	10	1							4										9	37	Details
Dublin City	8	11	9	4	10	8	1	2								1			1		8	63	Details
Dún Laoghaire–Rathdown	5	16		5	1	6		2													5	40	Details
Fingal	6	7	4	7	2	1			2			2	1		1						7	40	Details
Galway	11	13	2				6													1	6	39	Details
Galway City	4	4	1	3	2																4	18	Details
Kerry	9	6	4	2														1			11	33	Details
Kildare	12	11	1	5	7		1														3	40	Details
Kilkenny	11	7	1	2		1															2	24	Details
Laois	6	5	2	1																	5	19	Details
Leitrim	6	3	4																		5	18	Details
Limerick	10	13	3	3	2	1	2		1												5	40	Details
Longford	8	8																			2	18	Details
Louth	6	6	7	2		1															7	29	Details
Mayo	10	10	1				1		1												7	30	Details
Meath	9	11	6		1				2												11	40	Details
Monaghan	3	6	8																		1	18	Details
Offaly	8	5	3				1														2	19	Details
Roscommon	5	4	1				1														7	18	Details
Sligo	6	4	2	1				1													4	18	Details
South Dublin	5	9	5	3	2		1	4						1							10	40	Details
Tipperary	10	10	2	3													1				14	40	Details
Waterford	5	8	7	3	1																8	32	Details
Westmeath	9	4	2	2			1														2	20	Details
Wexford	9	8	3	2					1	5											6	34	Details
Wicklow	4	9	2	1	3	2	1														10	32	Details
Total	248	245	102	56	35	23	23	10	8	5	4	3	1	1	1	1	1	1	1	1	186	949	

== Opinion polls ==
Last date of polling	Polling firm / Commissioner	Sample size	SF Left	FF Renew	FG EPP	GP G/EFA	Lab S&D	SD	PBP–S	Aon	O/I
22 May 2024	Red C/Business Post	1,021	21	15	19	3	5	4	4	3	26 (Note: Includes 24% for "Independent" and 2% for "Other Party".)
15 May 2024	The Irish Times/Ipsos B&A	1,500	18	20	21	5	6	3	2	1	23
8 February 2020	2020 general election	—N/a	24.5	22.2	20.9	7.1	4.4	2.9	2.6	1.9	13.5
24 May 2019	2019 local elections	—N/a	9.5	26.9	25.6	5.6	5.7	2.3	1.9	1.5	24.1

== Aftermath ==
The results were seen as a victory for governing coalition parties Fianna Fáil and Fine Gael, and a disappointment for Sinn Féin, which had significantly underperformed its polling despite performing better than in the 2019 elections. Fine Gael credited the results to the resignation of Leo Varadkar, which injected "fresh energy" in the coalition. The Guardian, who stated that "the local elections were a calamity for Sinn Féin", also reported that some figures within the coalition called on taoiseach Simon Harris to call for a snap election to "seize the momentum." Harris, Micheál Martin, and Eamon Ryan, rejected calls for an early election.

Financial Times reported that Sinn Féin did particularly poor because their core demographic, the working-class and youth, increasingly hardened on immigration, and instead voted for independents and far-right parties. These parties in turn saw an increase in support, with the Irish Freedom Party and National Party seeing their first ever elected officials, though the number of far-right candidates elected remained small. Independent candidates and the conservative Independent Ireland party notably performed well.

== See also ==
- 2024 Irish general election
