= 2019 FIFA Women's World Cup final =

Eighth FIFA Women's World Cup Final held in Lyon, France

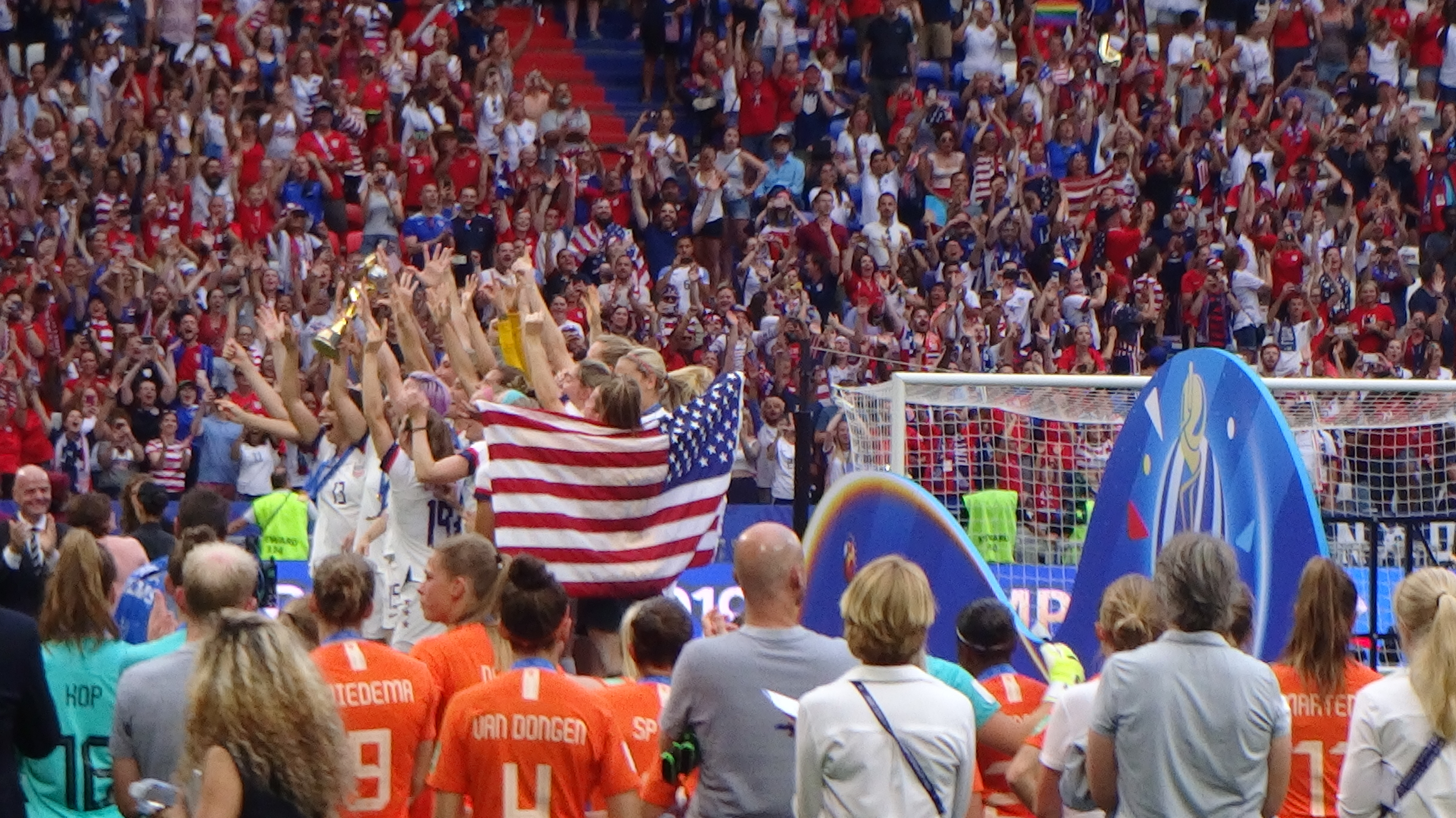
- The US team lifts the World Cup trophy
- Event: 2019 FIFA Women's World Cup
United States	Netherlands
2	0
- Date: 7 July 2019
- Venue: Parc Olympique Lyonnais, Décines-Charpieu
- Player of the Match: Megan Rapinoe (United States)
- Referee: Stéphanie Frappart (France)
- Attendance: 57,900
- Weather: Partly cloudy 30 °C (86 °F); 41% humidity

The 2019 FIFA Women's World Cup final was an association football match which determined the winner of the 2019 FIFA Women's World Cup. It was the eighth final of the FIFA Women's World Cup, a quadrennial tournament contested by the women's national teams of the member associations of FIFA. The match was played on 7 July 2019 at the Parc Olympique Lyonnais in Décines-Charpieu, a suburb of Lyon, France.

The final was contested by the United States, the defending champion, and the Netherlands, in their first final. The United States won 2–0, earning their second consecutive and fourth overall Women's World Cup title, with second-half goals scored by co-captain Megan Rapinoe (from the penalty spot) and Rose Lavelle. With their victory, the U.S. joined Germany as the second team to win consecutive titles. The team's coach, Jill Ellis, became the first manager to win two Women's World Cup titles, and also the first in 81 years since Vittorio Pozzo achieved this result in the 1934 and 1938 FIFA World Cups with Italy men's team.

Each finalist was the reigning champion of their own respective confederation, with the U.S. having won the 2018 CONCACAF Women's Championship and the Netherlands having won UEFA Women's Euro 2017.

== Venue ==
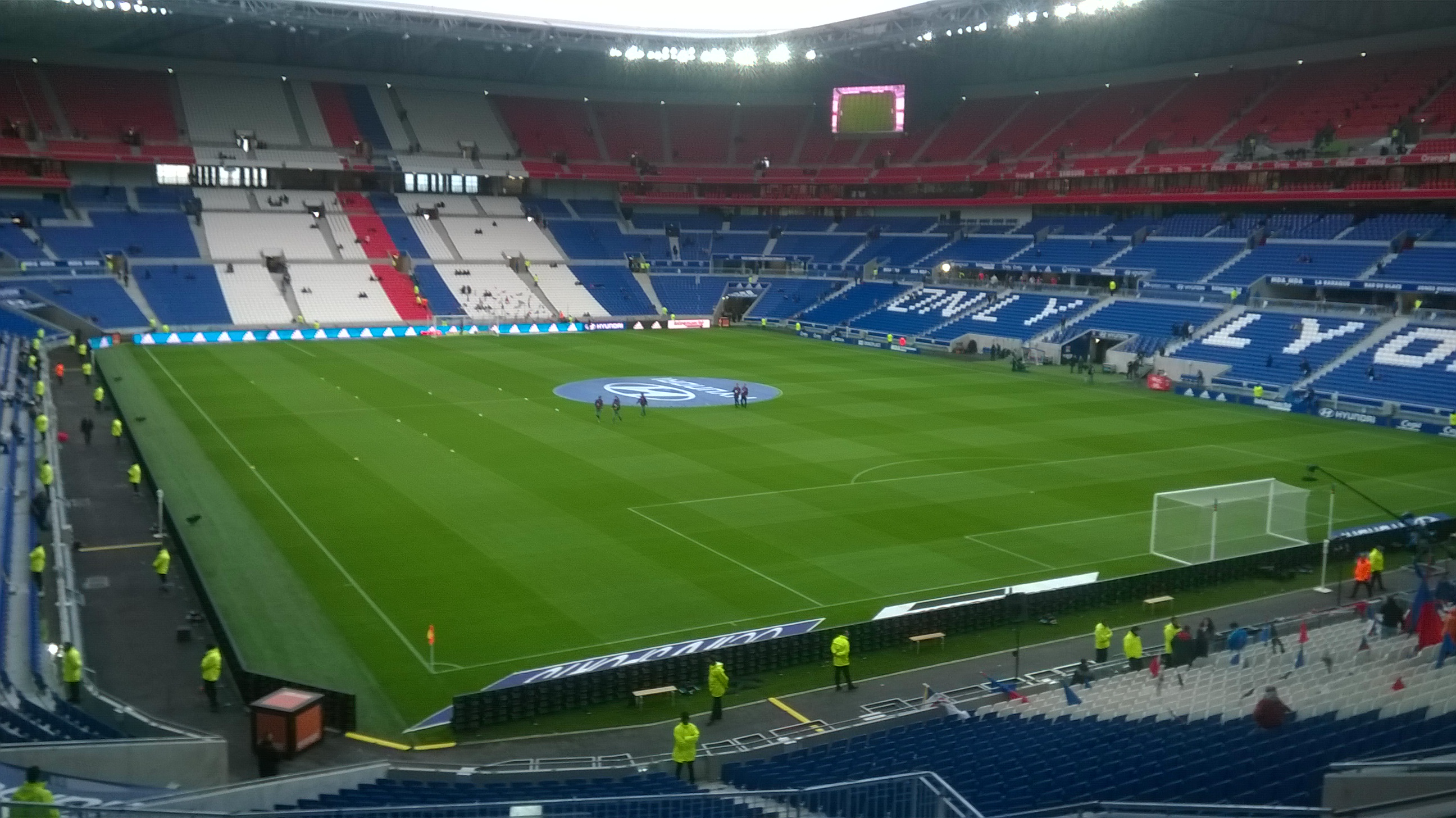
The Parc Olympique Lyonnais in Décines-Charpieu hosted the final.

The final was held at the Parc Olympique Lyonnais in Décines-Charpieu, a suburb of Lyon. During the tournament, the stadium was referred to as the Stade de Lyon by FIFA. The venue has a seating capacity of 57,900, and hosted both semi-final matches. The stadium was announced as the final venue when France was confirmed as host on 19 March 2015, with the stadium officially confirmed to host the semi-finals and final in September 2017. The stadium is home venue of Ligue 1 club Lyon, opening in January 2016 to replace their previous stadium, the Stade de Gerland. It has also hosted several UEFA Women's Champions League matches for the club's women's side, which is the most successful in European history.

In 2008, the project for the new stadium was agreed upon by the government and commune of Décines. Stadium construction started in mid 2013, and finished in late 2015 at a cost of €450 million. The stadium was chosen as a venue for UEFA Euro 2016, where it hosted six matches. The stadium also hosted the 2017 Coupe de la Ligue Final and 2018 UEFA Europa League Final. Outside of football, the Parc Olympique Lyonnais has hosted several musical performances, as well as ice hockey and rugby union matches, including the Rugby Champions Cup and Rugby Challenge Cup finals of 2016. The stadium is planned to host matches for the 2023 Rugby World Cup and the men and women's football tournaments at the 2024 Summer Olympics.

== Background ==
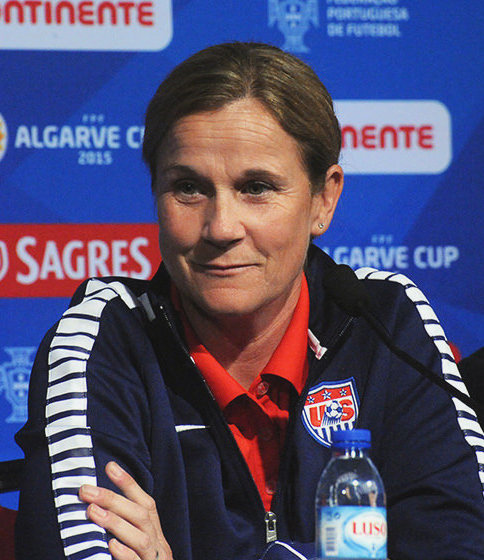
U.S. coach Jill Ellis was vying to become the first manager to win two Women's World Cup titles.

For the first time since 2007, and fifth time overall (along with 1991, 1995 and 2003), the final featured a European team, as the continent took seven of the eight places in the quarter-finals. The previous two finals were contested by Japan and the United States. The match was the first final since 1991 to feature a North American side against a European side. The match was also the first final of a women's or men's World Cup to feature the defending champions against the reigning European champions.

The match was a record-extending fifth Women's World Cup final for the United States, who were the defending champions and record winners of the competition with three titles. They won the inaugural final in 1991 against Norway, before winning their second title in 1999 as hosts via a penalty shoot-out victory against China PR. They made their next appearance in the 2011 final, losing on penalties to Japan, before securing their third title in the 2015 rematch against Japan. In the previous seven editions of the tournament, the U.S. never finished outside of the top three. The fixture was the third consecutive appearance in the final for the United States, setting a competition record.

Jill Ellis became the third manager to reach two Women's World Cup finals, after Even Pellerud for Norway (in 1991 and 1995) and Norio Sasaki for Japan (in 2011 and 2015), both with one win and one loss in the final. With her counterpart Sarina Wiegman, the match was the second final in which both teams have a female coach, after the 2003 matchup between Tina Theune of Germany and Marika Domanski-Lyfors of Sweden.

The match was the first Women's World Cup final for the Netherlands in their second tournament appearance. They were the fourth European country (after Germany, Norway and Sweden) and eighth overall to reach a Women's World Cup final, and the first new finalist since Japan in 2011. In the Netherlands only prior tournament appearance, in 2015, they were eliminated in the round of 16 by defending champions and eventual runners-up Japan.

The match was the eighth meeting between the United States and the Netherlands, and the first competitive fixture as all prior matches were friendlies. The sides first met in 1991, which the Netherlands won 4–3, but the U.S. won all six subsequent meetings, most recently a 3–1 win in September 2016.

== Route to the final ==
United States
Round
Netherlands
Opponents
Result
Group stage
Opponents
Result
Thailand
13–0
Match 1
New Zealand
1–0
Chile
3–0
Match 2
Cameroon
3–1
Sweden
2–0
Match 3
Canada
2–1
Group F winners

Pos	Team	Pld	Pts
1	United States	3	9
2	Sweden	3	6
3	Chile	3	3
4	Thailand	3	0

Source: FIFA
Final standings
Group E winners

Pos	Team	Pld	Pts
1	Netherlands	3	9
2	Canada	3	6
3	Cameroon	3	3
4	New Zealand	3	0

Source: FIFA
Opponents
Result
Knockout stage
Opponents
Result
Spain
2–1
Round of 16
Japan
2–1
France
2–1
Quarter-finals
Italy
2–0
England
2–1
Semi-finals
Sweden
1–0 (a.e.t.)

=== United States ===
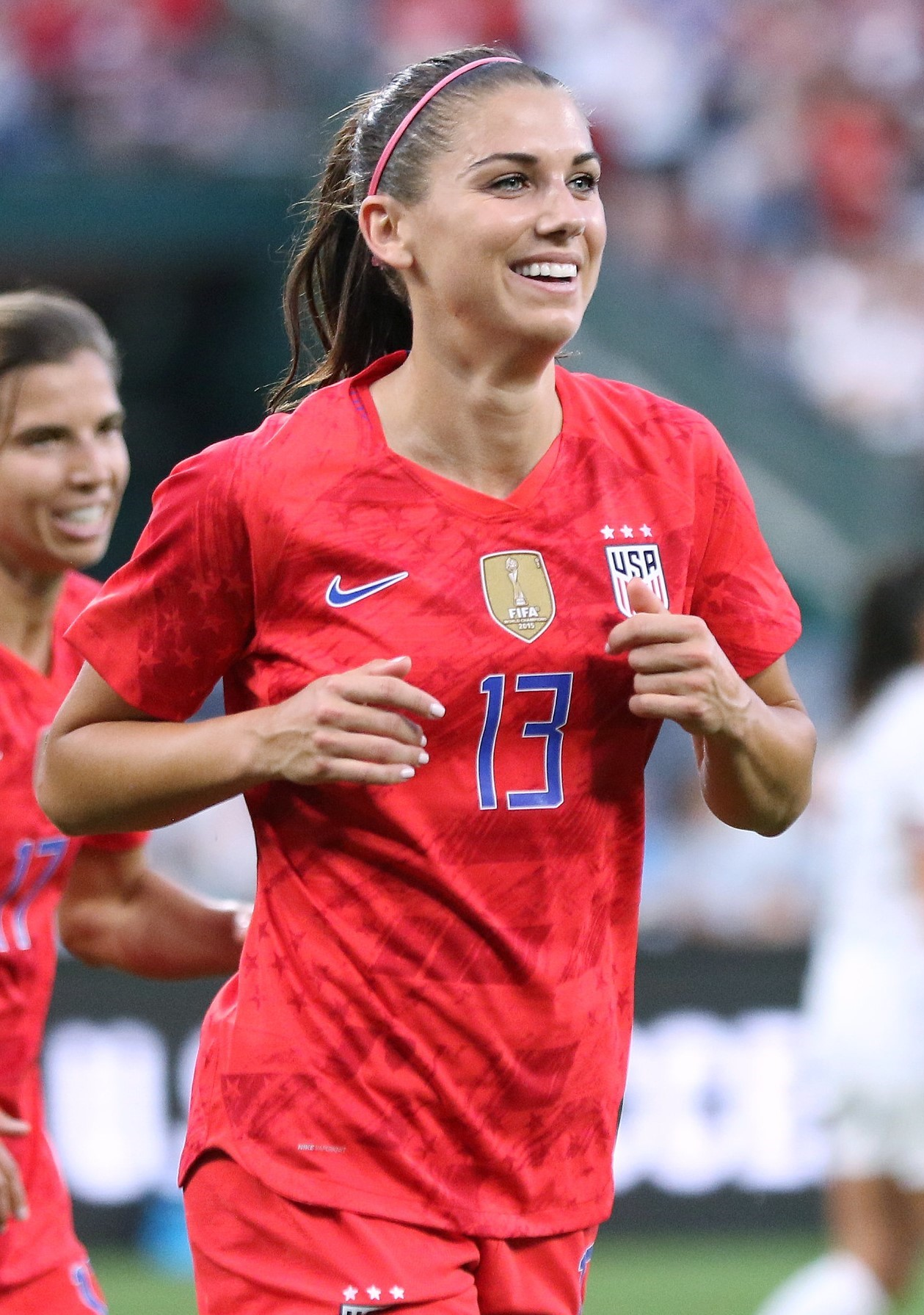
Alex Morgan scored six times for the United States, including five in their opening match

The United States is the most successful team in women's football, having won three Women's World Cups in four previous final appearances and four Olympic gold medals. The team had never finished below third place in all eight editions of the World Cup. Jill Ellis was appointed as interim head coach of the team in 2014, following the firing of Tom Sermanni between major tournaments, and oversaw qualification for the 2015 World Cup using a core inherited from earlier cycles. The United States had reached their second consecutive final in 2015, playing in a rematch of the 2011 final in which they had lost to Japan. The Americans won 5–2, including a first-half hat-trick by Carli Lloyd, to secure their third Women's World Cup title—their first since 1999. Following an early quarter-final exit at the 2016 Olympics, Ellis adjusted the team's usual formation and adopted a 4–3–3 with an emphasis on faster play under the direction of new call-ups. The United States qualified for the 2019 Women's World Cup by winning the 2018 CONCACAF Women's Championship, outscoring their opponents 26–0 and defeating Canada in the final.

The U.S. team, entering the tournament ranked first in the FIFA World Rankings, were drawn into Group F and opened their title defence with a 13–0 victory against Thailand, setting a new tournament record for largest margin of victory and goals in a match. Alex Morgan scored five goals, equalling a one-match record set by compatriot Michelle Akers in 1991, while four of her teammates scored their first World Cup goals in their debut at the tournament. The U.S. team were later criticised for celebrating their later goals during the match, with some media commentators and former players calling it disrespectful, but the celebrations were defended by other media commentators, the team's players and members of the opposing Thai bench. Ellis then fielded a squad of reserve players in a 3–0 win over debutants Chile, which included Carli Lloyd's pair of goals and a missed penalty kick. The U.S. closed out its group by winning 2–0 against Sweden, advancing with three shutout victories and outscoring opponents 18–0, a group stage record in the Women's World Cup.

In the round of 16, the U.S. played Group B runners-up Spain, who conceded an early penalty in the seventh minute that was converted by captain Megan Rapinoe. Spanish forward Jennifer Hermoso found an equaliser within three minutes after capitalising on a defensive error near the top of the box, shooting from distance to beat goalkeeper Alyssa Naeher and end her shutout streak. The U.S. were awarded a second penalty kick after a foul in the box on Rose Lavelle and won the match 2–1 on another conversion by Rapinoe in the 75th minute per instruction from Ellis, after Morgan initially looked set to take the kick. The Americans were then matched against hosts France, winners of Group A and a tournament favourite, in the quarter-finals. This was the first time the U.S. had faced the tournament hosts of the Women's World Cup. Rapinoe opened the scoring in the fifth minute, with a free kick that was driven low and through several players, and added a second in the 65th minute by finishing a cut-back cross from Tobin Heath in the box. French defender Wendie Renard scored a consolation goal in the 81st minute on a headed corner kick, but the U.S. held on to win 2–1 and eliminate the hosts.

The U.S. played England in the semi-finals, but were without Rapinoe due to a hamstring injury that kept her out of the starting line-up. Her replacement, Christen Press, scored the opening goal in the tenth minute on a header in the box; English forward Ellen White then volleyed a shot from inside the box in the 19th minute to earn her team an equaliser. Alex Morgan restored the U.S. lead in the 31st minute, the first player in Women's World Cup history to score on her birthday, finishing a cross by Lindsey Horan with a header that she celebrated with a controversial tea-sipping gesture. White scored an apparent second equaliser in the 67th minute, but was ruled offside by a video assistant referee (VAR) decision. A VAR decision in the 82nd minute determined that White was fouled in the penalty area by defender Becky Sauerbrunn and awarded a penalty to England. The resulting penalty was struck by captain Steph Houghton and saved by Alyssa Naeher, the first penalty save by a U.S. goalkeeper in the Women's World Cup outside of a shoot-out, ensuring a 2–1 victory for the United States. The U.S. reached their third consecutive Women's World Cup final by winning all six matches without trailing. Their semi-final win set a new tournament record for longest winning streak with eleven wins since 2015, as well as a record sixteen World Cup matches undefeated. They scored 24 goals en route to the final, including one in the opening twelve minutes of each match, coming close to the single-tournament record of 25.

=== Netherlands ===
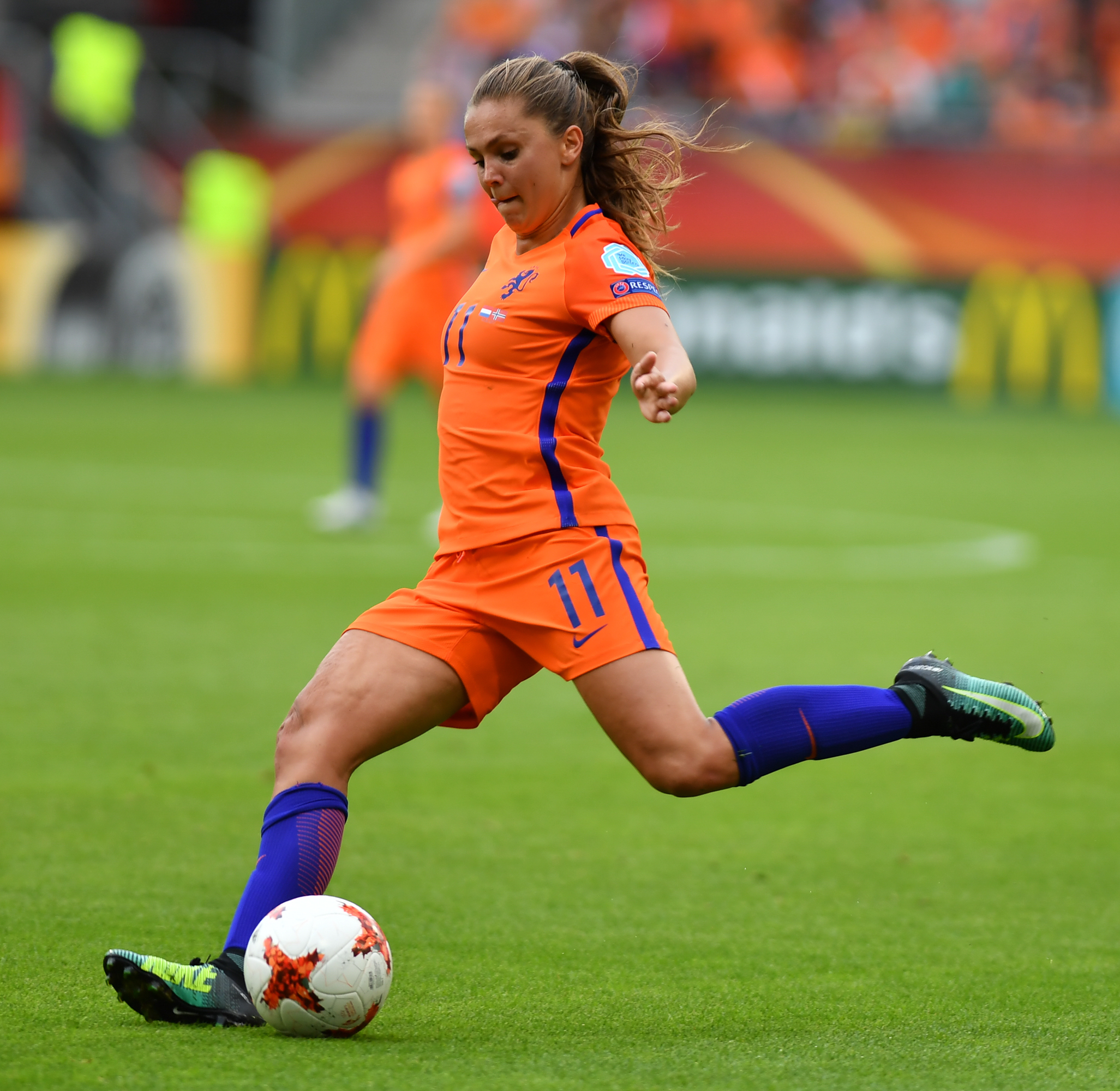
Dutch winger Lieke Martens scored twice in their round of 16 victory

The Netherlands, nicknamed the Oranje, first qualified for a major women's tournament in 2009, reaching the semi-finals of their first UEFA European Championship, and qualified for their first FIFA Women's World Cup in 2015. The team's rapid improvement in international competition was credited to the establishment of a professional club league in 2007 with investment from the Royal Dutch Football Association; the league later merged to form a combined Belgian–Dutch competition in 2012 and split again in 2015. In the 2015 Women's World Cup, the Dutch side finished third in their group with a 1–1–1 record and advanced to the round of 16, where they lost 2–1 to eventual runners-up Japan. The Netherlands hosted and won the 2017 European Championship, earning their first major international title with a dominating style implemented by interim manager Sarina Wiegman. The Dutch earned the last remaining European berth in the 2019 Women's World Cup by finishing second to Norway in its qualification group and winning the play-offs, defeating Denmark over two legs in the semi-finals and Switzerland in the finals.

The Dutch, ranked eighth in the FIFA World Rankings, were drawn into Group E with two of their 2015 group stage opponents, Canada and New Zealand, alongside Cameroon. Their opening match against New Zealand was scoreless until a last-minute header by substitute Jill Roord in stoppage time won it 1–0 for the Dutch. The Netherlands secured a knockout stage berth by defeating Cameroon 3–1 on the second matchday, with two goals by Vivianne Miedema to make her the nation's all-time top goalscorer. The Dutch finished with a three-win record and topped the group after winning 2–1 against Canada. An early penalty was rescinded by the VAR and the opening goal was scored by Dutch defender Anouk Dekker in the 54th minute. Christine Sinclair scored an equaliser six minutes later, but the Netherlands restored their lead in the 75th minute through a short-range finish by substitute Lineth Beerensteyn.

The round of 16 fixture for the Oranje was also a rematch against Japan, which manager Wiegman expected to end with a different result. Lieke Martens scored in the 17th minute with a backheel flick off a corner kick, but Japanese midfielder Yui Hasegawa equalised before half-time. The second half saw Japan creating more chances, with Dutch goalkeeper Sari van Veenendaal crucially saving a shot from Yuka Momiki in the 80th minute to keep the scores level. In second-half stoppage time, the Dutch were awarded a controversial penalty kick by the VAR for a handball in the box by captain Saki Kumagai, which was then scored by Martens to win the match 2–1. The Netherlands defeated Italy 2–0 in the quarter-finals, also qualifying for the 2020 Olympics, through second-half headers scored by Miedema in the 70th minute and Stefanie van der Gragt ten minutes later. The match was played in 34 °C (93 °F) heat and required several cooling breaks, which slowed the tempo of play.

The Netherlands reached their first Women's World Cup final by winning 1–0 in extra time against Sweden in the semi-finals. The match was scoreless in regulation time, due to the performances of both defences and goalkeepers, who made saves to keep several chances from breaking the deadlock. Jackie Groenen scored the lone goal of the match in the 99th minute, striking from 20 yards (18 m) to beat goalkeeper Hedvig Lindahl, with her first shot on target during the tournament. The Dutch were the third reigning European champions to reach the final, following Germany in 2003 and 2007, and the first to play a non-European country in the final. The Netherlands also managed to reach the final without trailing in their six victories, conceding only once in the knockout stage but not leading at half-time in any of their matches.

The success of the Dutch side has brought national attention to the women's football program, including thousands of fans who travelled to France to attend matches and record television ratings reaching 5 million viewers for the semi-final.

== Pre-match ==
=== Scheduling ===
The final's scheduling on 7 July led to a degree of criticism among supporters of women's football, as two continental men's tournament finals were held on the same day—the Copa América in Rio de Janeiro and the CONCACAF Gold Cup in Chicago. The latter final also featured the men's team of the United States. However, FIFA confirmed the Women's World Cup dates in September 2017, prior to the dates announced by CONMEBOL and CONCACAF.

While FIFA called the scheduling a "rare and exciting occurrence", U.S. co-captain Megan Rapinoe criticised it as "ridiculous and disappointing". CONCACAF president Victor Montagliani said that the scheduling of the Gold Cup final had been the result of a "clerical error" and that the conflict was not realised until it was too late.

=== Match ball ===
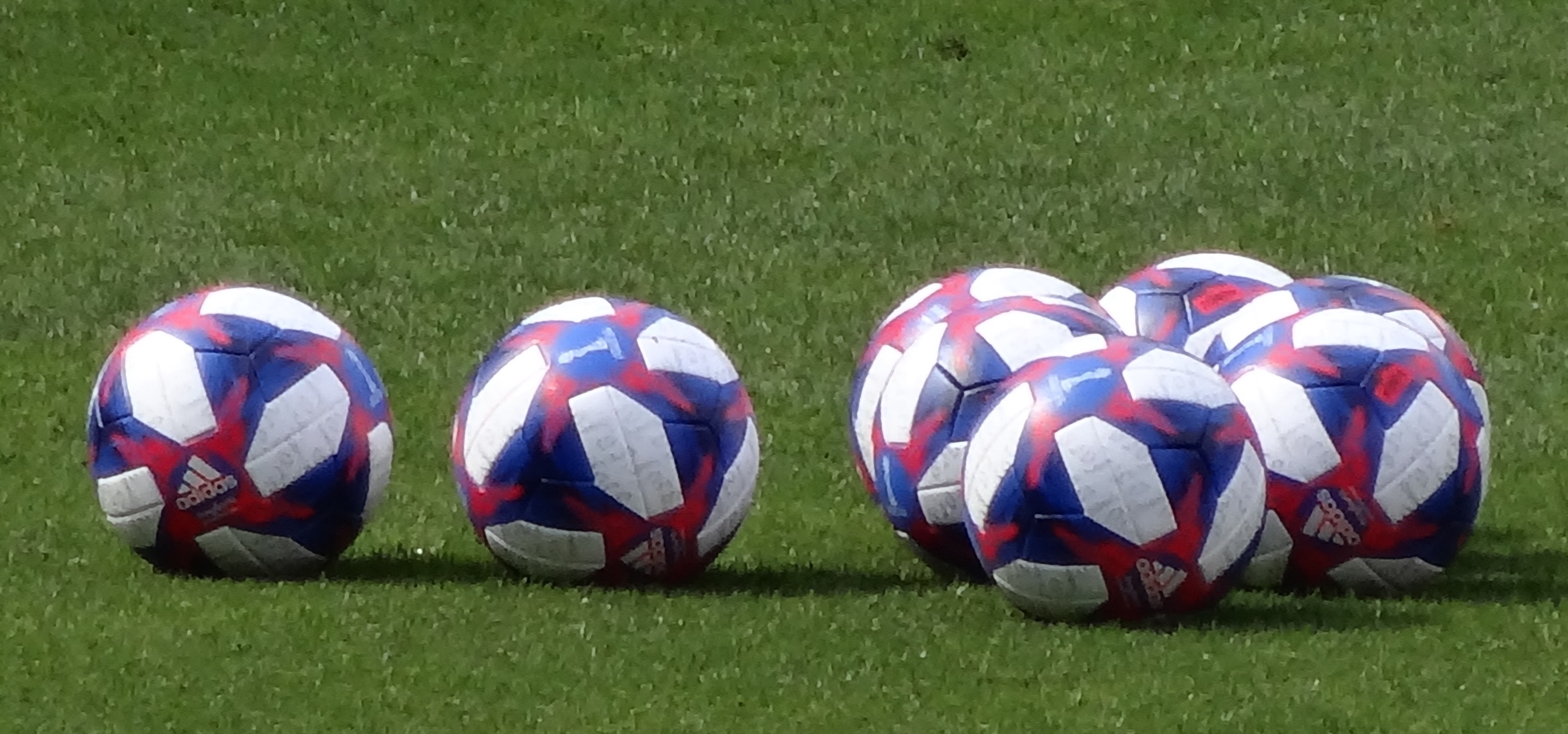
Tricolore 19, the match ball of the final.

The official match ball for the final was the Adidas Tricolore 19, introduced for the knockout stage as a red-coloured variant of the Conext 19. The ball featured a blue-and-red glitch graphic, and pays homage to the original Adidas Tricolore, which was introduced for the men's 1998 FIFA World Cup, in which France were victorious for the first time while on home soil.

=== Officials ===
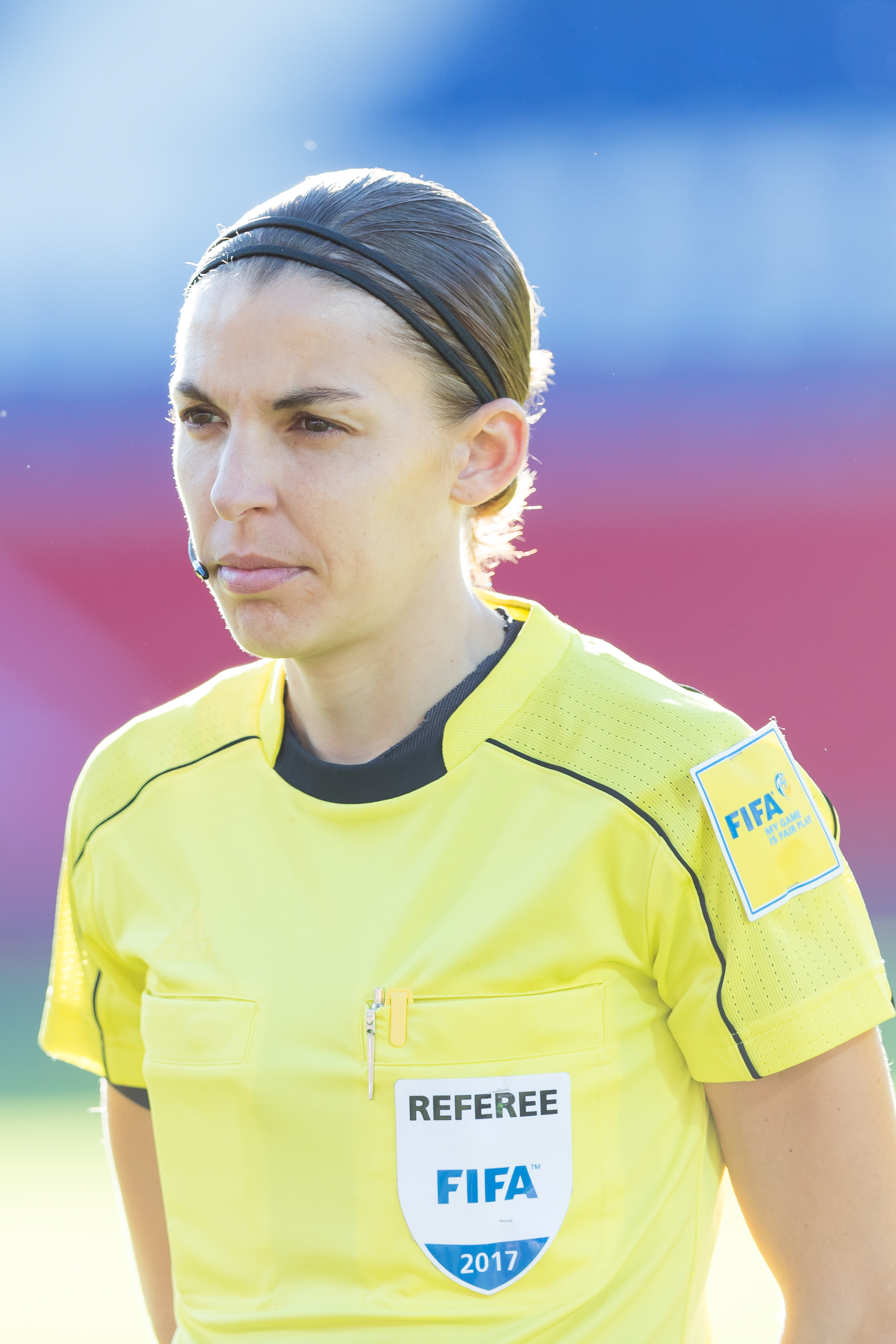
Stéphanie Frappart, the referee for the final.

On 5 July 2019, FIFA named French official Stéphanie Frappart as the referee for the final. Frappart had been a FIFA referee since 2009, and previously officiated at the 2015 FIFA Women's World Cup, 2016 Summer Olympics and UEFA Women's Euro 2017. In April 2019, she became the first woman to referee in Ligue 1, the top men's professional league in France. The final was Frappart's fourth match as referee during the tournament, having officiated two group stage matches and a quarter-final fixture. Her compatriot Manuela Nicolosi was chosen as one of the assistant referees, along with Irish official Michelle O'Neill. Claudia Umpiérrez of Uruguay was chosen as the fourth official, with her compatriot Luciana Mascaraña serving as the reserve assistant referee. Spaniard Carlos del Cerro Grande was named the video assistant referee, presiding over the first use of the technology in the final of the Women's World Cup. His fellow countryman José María Sánchez Martínez was named as one of the assistant video assistant referees for the match, along with Mariana de Almeida of Argentina.

=== Team selection ===
American co-captain Megan Rapinoe, who scored five goals and had three assists during the tournament, was left out of the semi-final line-up against England due to a pulled hamstring. However, she said that she expected to return ahead of the final. U.S. midfielder Rose Lavelle also had to be substituted out in the semi-final due to a hamstring injury, though she also said that she was fit to play in the final.

Dutch winger Lieke Martens, winner of The Best FIFA Women's Player in 2017, was also listed as questionable due to a toe injury. She started in the semi-final against Sweden, previously a doubt for the match, though she was unable to make an impact and was substituted out at half-time. The team's goalkeeper, Sari van Veenendaal, finished the semi-final with a swollen hand, but returned to the starting line-up for the final.

== Match ==
=== Summary ===
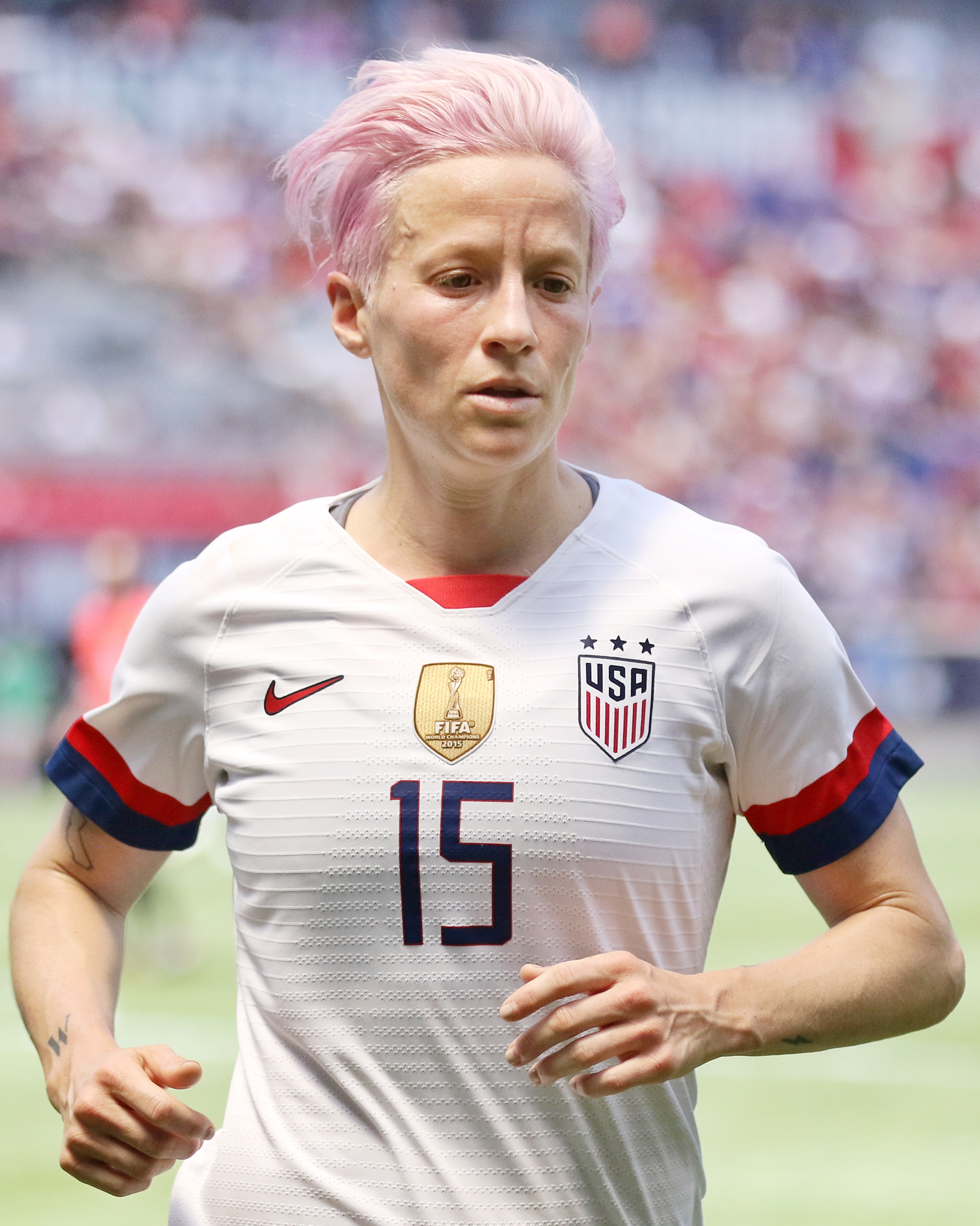
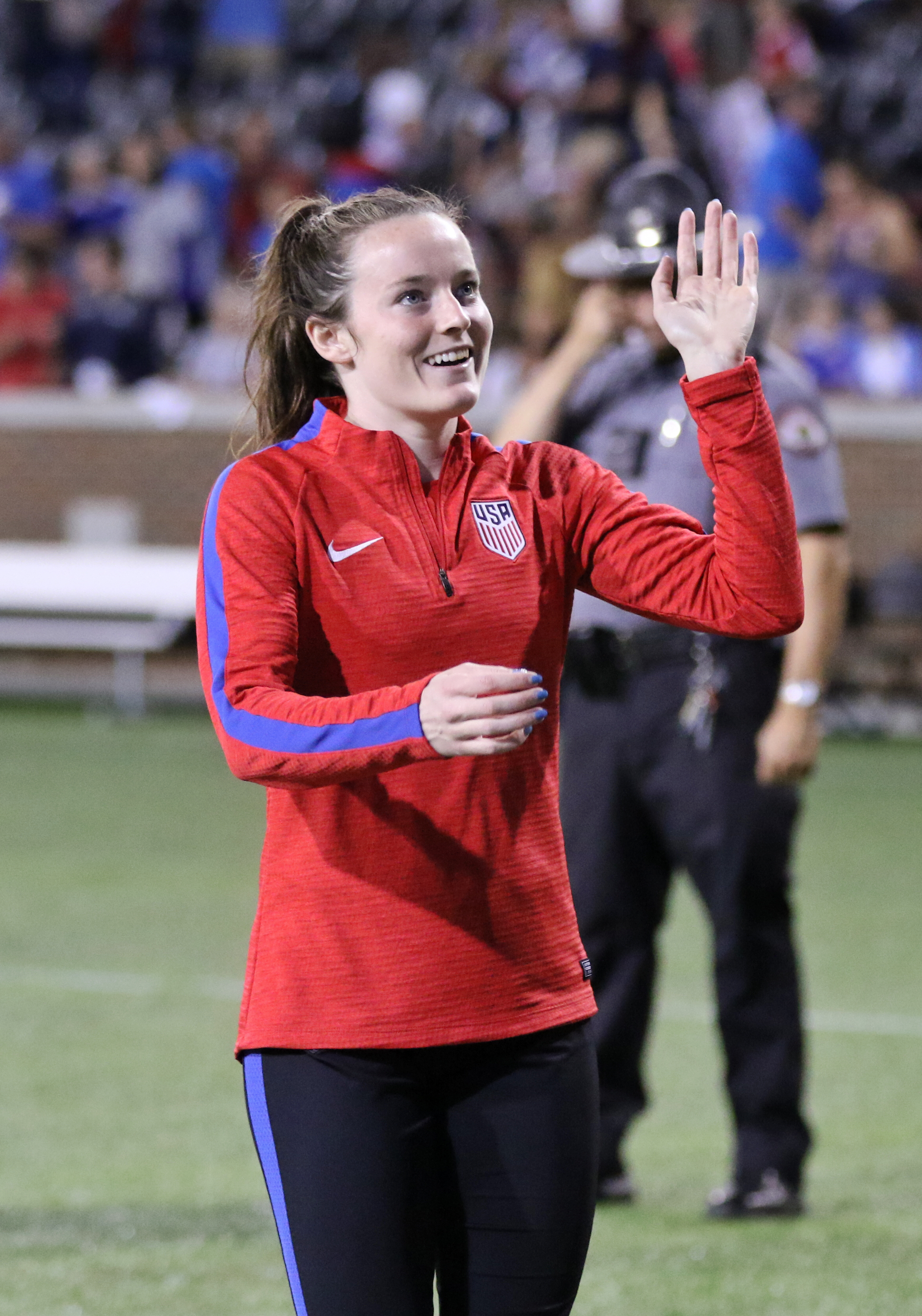
Megan Rapinoe (left) and Rose Lavelle (right) scored second-half goals for the United States in the final.

The United States fielded their unusual 4–3–3 that was used by Jill Ellis during the tournament, including Megan Rapinoe, the U.S. captain for the match, after her injury that kept her from starting in the semi-final. Lieke Martens returned for the Netherlands side, while Shanice van de Sanden was placed on the bench. The match kicked off at 17:00 in 31 °C (88 °F) heat, which was lower than the earlier forecasts for the ongoing continental heat wave. The match was attended by 57,900 spectators, including a large number of American fans and a stand of Dutch fans organised behind one of the goals. French president Emmanuel Macron, Dutch monarch Willem-Alexander, and several professional male and female footballers were also among those in attendance.

External videos
- USA v Netherlands - FIFA Women’s World Cup France 2019 - THE FINAL, YouTube video from FIFATV

The United States started several attacks early in the match, but failed to score within the opening twelve minutes as they had in their previous six matches. The two sides traded fouls, including one that earned Sherida Spitse a yellow card in the tenth minute, but the U.S. remained in control of possession and had several chances towards goal. Dutch goalkeeper and captain Sari van Veenendaal made several saves to keep her shutout, including two shots before half-time from Sam Mewis and Alex Morgan. A foul on Rose Lavelle at the top of the penalty area was left uncalled, allowing the Dutch to spring a counterattack that ended with a foul on forward Lineth Beerensteyn by U.S. defender Abby Dahlkemper, who earned a yellow card. In first half stoppage time, U.S. defender Kelley O'Hara and Dutch winger Lieke Martens collided heads during an aerial challenge, resulting in O'Hara being substituted at half-time for Ali Krieger.

Another physical challenge, resulting in a bloody facial cut for U.S. defender Becky Sauerbrunn, began the second half as the U.S. continued to have the majority of attacking chances. Dutch defender Stefanie van der Gragt kicked U.S. attacker Alex Morgan in the shoulder while attempting to control the ball in the penalty area, which was left uncalled until a VAR review by referee Stéphanie Frappart awarded a penalty to the United States. Van der Gragt earned a yellow card and the penalty was scored in the 61st minute by U.S. captain Megan Rapinoe, who left Van Veenendaal standing on her line; the penalty was Rapinoe's sixth goal of the tournament, winning her the Golden Boot and making her the oldest player to score in a Women's World Cup final. Eight minutes later, Rose Lavelle scored the second goal of the final for the U.S. on a solo run through the Dutch defence that ended with a left-footed strike from 17 yards (16 m).

Down 2–0 and still conceding attacking chances to the U.S., the Netherlands substituted defender Anouk Dekker for forward Shanice van de Sanden and forced a save out of U.S. goalkeeper Alyssa Naeher. Van Veenendaal made several saves to deny a third goal for the United States after shots on target by Morgan, Tobin Heath, and Crystal Dunn. Rapinoe was substituted by Christen Press in the 79th minute, while Carli Lloyd was brought on in the last minutes of regulation time. After the end of the match, the U.S. bench spilled onto the field to celebrate the team's fourth Women's World Cup title.

=== Details ===
7 July 2019
17:00 CEST

United States	2–0	Netherlands
Rapinoe 61' (pen.); Lavelle 69'	Report

Parc Olympique Lyonnais, Décines-Charpieu
Attendance: 57,900
Referee: Stéphanie Frappart (France)

United States	Netherlands

GK	1	Alyssa Naeher
RB	5	Kelley O'Hara		(substituted off) 46'
CB	7	Abby Dahlkemper	(yellow card) 42'
CB	4	Becky Sauerbrunn
LB	19	Crystal Dunn
CM	3	Sam Mewis
CM	8	Julie Ertz
CM	16	Rose Lavelle
RF	17	Tobin Heath		(substituted off) 87'
CF	13	Alex Morgan
LF	15	Megan Rapinoe (c)		(substituted off) 79'
Substitutions:
DF	11	Ali Krieger		(substituted on) 46'
FW	23	Christen Press		(substituted on) 79'
FW	10	Carli Lloyd		(substituted on) 87'
Manager:
Jill Ellis

GK	1	Sari van Veenendaal (c)
RB	2	Desiree van Lunteren
CB	6	Anouk Dekker		(substituted off) 73'
CB	3	Stefanie van der Gragt	(yellow card) 60'
LB	20	Dominique Bloodworth
CM	14	Jackie Groenen
CM	10	Daniëlle van de Donk
CM	8	Sherida Spitse	(yellow card) 10'
RF	21	Lineth Beerensteyn
CF	9	Vivianne Miedema
LF	11	Lieke Martens		(substituted off) 70'
Substitutions:
MF	19	Jill Roord		(substituted on) 70'
FW	7	Shanice van de Sanden		(substituted on) 73'
Manager:
Sarina Wiegman

Player of the Match:
Megan Rapinoe (United States)

Assistant referees:
Manuela Nicolosi (France)
Michelle O'Neill (Republic of Ireland)
Fourth official:
Claudia Umpiérrez (Uruguay)
Reserve assistant referee:
Luciana Mascaraña (Uruguay)
Video assistant referee:
Carlos del Cerro Grande (Spain)
Assistant video assistant referees:
José María Sánchez Martínez (Spain)
Mariana de Almeida (Argentina)

Match rules

- 90 minutes.
- 30 minutes of extra time if necessary.
- Penalty shoot-out if scores still level.
- Maximum of twelve named substitutes.
- Maximum of three substitutions, with a fourth allowed in extra time.

=== Statistics ===
First half
Statistic	United States	Netherlands
Goals scored	0	0
Total shots	5	2
Shots on target	4	0
Saves	0	4
Ball possession	53%	47%
Corner kicks	5	2
Fouls committed	4	3
Offsides	1	1
Yellow cards	1	1
Red cards	0	0

Second half
Statistic	United States	Netherlands
Goals scored	2	0
Total shots	12	4
Shots on target	5	1
Saves	1	3
Ball possession	53%	47%
Corner kicks	3	0
Fouls committed	5	4
Offsides	2	0
Yellow cards	0	1
Red cards	0	0

Overall
Statistic	United States	Netherlands
Goals scored	2	0
Total shots	17	6
Shots on target	9	1
Saves	1	7
Ball possession	53%	47%
Corner kicks	8	2
Fouls committed	9	7
Offsides	3	1
Yellow cards	1	2
Red cards	0	0

== Post-match ==
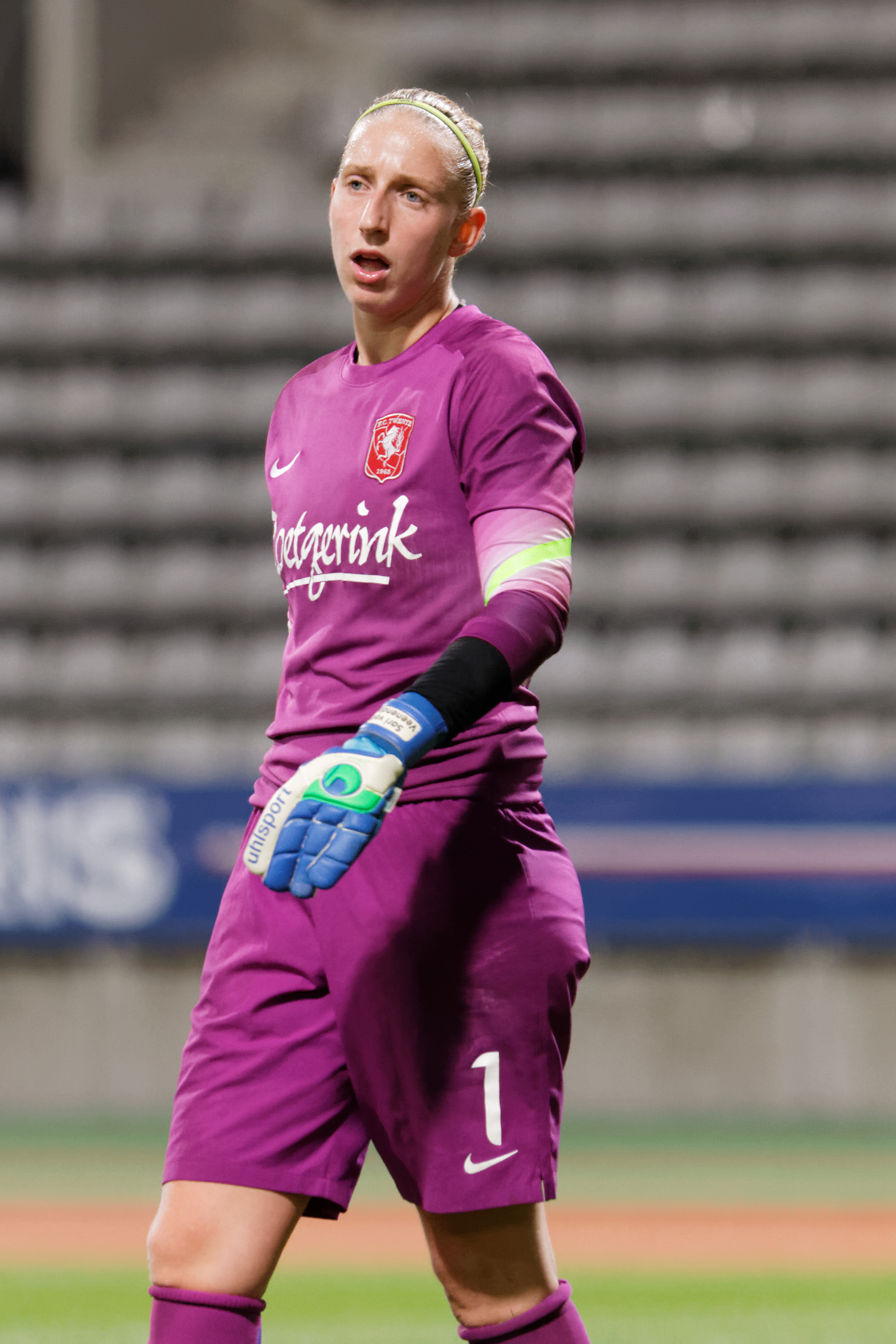
Dutch goalkeeper Sari van Veenendaal won the Golden Glove award as best goalkeeper of the tournament.

The United States won a record-extending fourth title, and became the second team to win consecutive editions of the Women's World Cup, following Germany in 2003 and 2007. The victory was also the first World Cup title on European soil for the U.S. During the 2019 tournament, the U.S. scored 26 goals to set a new record for most goals in a single Women's World Cup, surpassing the record of 25 shared by the U.S. in 1991 and Germany in 2003. The team's goal difference of +23 also set a new tournament record. Their World Cup unbeaten streak was also extended to 17 matches, including 12 consecutive wins. Jill Ellis became the first manager to win two Women's World Cup titles, amid criticism from fans over her style of management. On 10 July, the team were honoured with a ticker tape parade down the Canyon of Heroes in New York City and received their third Outstanding Team ESPY Award in Los Angeles.

Megan Rapinoe was named the player of the match, and was awarded the Golden Ball as the best player of the tournament. She also won the Golden Boot as the top scorer of the tournament with six goals and three assists, while Alex Morgan won the Silver Boot with the same tallies; Rapinoe won the award on the second tie-breaker, having played fewer minutes. At the age of 34, Rapinoe became the oldest player to win the Golden Ball and Golden Boot awards. Rose Lavelle won the Bronze Ball award, while Dutch goalkeeper Sari van Veenendaal won the Golden Glove award as the best goalkeeper of the tournament; her eight saves in the final were the most during any knockout stage match in the 2019 tournament.

Rapinoe became the second player to start in three Women's World Cup finals, after Birgit Prinz of Germany (1995, 2003 and 2007). Additionally, Tobin Heath, Ali Krieger, Carli Lloyd and Alex Morgan joined them as the only players to make an appearance in three finals. Rapinoe's goal made her the first player to convert a penalty outside of a shoot-out in a Women's World Cup final, as German goalkeeper Nadine Angerer saved the only previous final penalty taken by Marta of Brazil in 2007. The goal also meant that Rapinoe became the oldest player to score in a final, surpassing teammate Carli Lloyd who scored a hat-trick in the 2015 final at the age of 32 years and 354 days.

The United States will receive $4 million (3.5 million euros) in prize money as the winners of the tournament, while the Netherlands will receive $2.6 million (2.3 million euros) as runners-up. The U.S. team will also play a four-match victory tour that will entitle them to a share of profits, totalling approximately $250,000 per player. The monetary prizes, along with small bonuses from the United States Soccer Federation, were criticised as being unfair and discriminatory compared to those offered to men's teams; fans in the stadium chanted "Equal pay!" during FIFA president Gianni Infantino's appearance at the trophy ceremony alongside French president Emmanuel Macron. Several media personalities and sportspeople from the U.S. also mentioned the issue while congratulating the team on their victory. In response, Senator Joe Manchin introduced a bill in the U.S. Senate that would make equal pay for the women's team a requirement for federal funding for the 2026 men's World Cup, which is planned to be partially hosted by the United States. U.S. President Donald Trump, who had criticised Rapinoe's anthem protest and comments about rejecting a White House visit, also congratulated the team alongside former presidents Barack Obama and Bill Clinton.

On 30 July 2019, the United States Soccer Federation announced that head coach Jill Ellis would step down upon completion of the team's U.S. victory tour in October 2019. Following her departure, she will continue to work as an ambassador for U.S. Soccer.

The U.S. team was named the Athlete of the Year by Time magazine, while Rapinoe was awarded the Ballon d'Or Féminin and named the Sports Illustrated Sportsperson of the Year.

== Broadcasting ==
The international broadcast of the match garnered an average of 82.18 million live viewers and 260 million total viewers, setting a new tournament record. The U.S. broadcast of the match on terrestrial television station Fox drew an average of 14.3 million, outranking the 2018 men's final (which did not feature the U.S.) but falling short of the 2015 Women's World Cup broadcast that was broadcast during U.S. prime time rather than late morning. An additional 1.6 million Americans watched the match on Telemundo in Spanish, and streaming audiences for Fox averaged 289,000 viewers.

In the Netherlands, the final was watched by 5.5 million people, an estimated 88 percent of people with television access. The Brazilian broadcast on TV Globo and its partners was watched by 19.9 million people (a 41.7 percent share), setting a new women's football record. Large audiences were also reported in France (5.9 million), Germany (5.1 million), Sweden (1.5 million) and the United Kingdom (3.2 million).

== See also ==
- Netherlands at the FIFA Women's World Cup
- United States at the FIFA Women's World Cup
