= Michelle O'Neill (referee) =

Irish association football referee

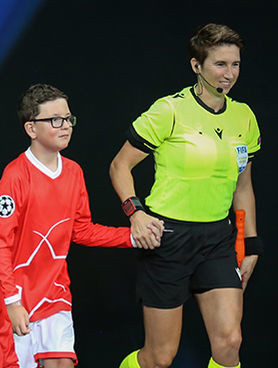
- O'Neill (right) assisting at 2019 UEFA Super Cup
- Born: 20 July 1978 (age 48); County Wexford
- Occupation: Football assistant/referee
- Years active: 2001 - 2024

Michelle O'Neill (born 20 July 1978) is an Irish retired soccer referee. In 2019, she was an assistant referee for the final of the Women's Football World Cup and, as part of an all-female team, for the 2019 UEFA Super Cup.

== Biography ==
After playing for the Adamstown, County Wexford and Wexford Youths clubs, O'Neill decided in 2008 to turn to refereeing. Quickly revealing her talents at local level, she joined the Football Association of Ireland Referee School of Excellence. Arriving at the high level, she refereed the League of Ireland Women's Premier Division then was chosen as an assistant referee for the League of Ireland and FAI Cup, where she has officiated since 2013.

O'Neill was an assistant referee in the UEFA Women's Champions League, refereeing nine Champions League matches between 2011 and 2019.

O'Neill began her career as an international match referee in 2013 with a 2015 World Cup qualifying match between the Netherlands and Albania, running the line for six matches in these qualifications.

In 2015, O'Neill was appointed to be an assistant referee at the FIFA Women's World Cup hosted in Canada, the second Irish person to do so after Eddie Foley was an assistant referee during the 1998 FIFA World Cup. During the World Cup she officiated at two matches.

In 2016, O'Neill was called upon to referee a men's UEFA Champions League match for the first time. She was an assistant referee alongside Irishman Neil Doyle for a qualifying match between FCI Levadia Tallinn and Slavia Prague.

In 2018, O'Neill was chosen to assist at the under-20's Women's World Cup in France, for North Korea versus England and China versus Nigeria. She was called for the second time to the Women's World Cup a year later, covering four games alongside French referee Stéphanie Frappart, with group ties Argentina versus Japan, and Netherlands against Canada, the quarter-final between Germany and Sweden, followed by the final, with the United States beating the Netherlands 2–0. making O'Neill the first ever to officiate at a World Cup final.

On 14 August 2019, O'Neill again assisted Frappart at the 2019 UEFA Super Cup between Liverpool FC and Chelsea FC in the Beşiktaş Stadium in Istanbul. This is the first time that a men's continental match of such magnitude has been refereed by a women's trio. A few days earlier, on 9 August, as preparation, Michelle had joined the duo of French women to referee a Ligue 2 match between Guingamp and Orléans.

She announced her retirement on 16 September 2024.

== Political career ==
O'Neill was an unsuccessful candidate for the Wexford Independent Alliance in the 2024 Wexford County Council election.

In November 2024, it was announced that O'Neill would run as a Fianna Fáil candidate in Wexford at the 2024 general election. She received 296 first-preference votes (0.6%) and was eliminated on the third count.
