= Wexford Independent Alliance =

Political grouping in County Wexford, Ireland

- Founder: Verona Murphy
- Founded: February 2024
- Local government: 5 / 949

Wexford Independent Alliance is a political grouping based in County Wexford, Ireland, founded by Independent TD, Verona Murphy, in 2024. Since the 2024 Irish local elections, the group has had five councillors on Wexford County Council.

== History ==
The Wexford Independent Alliance was publicly launched at an event held in Enniscorthy in March 2024. The launch event, which was hosted by Ivan Yates, introduced ten candidates for the 2024 local elections. It was attended by several hundred supporters. According to Murphy, the alliance sought to provide an alternative to the traditional party system and to increase the influence of independent representatives in local government.

In all, the WIA fielded twelve candidates in the 2024 local elections. In its analysis for the Wexford County Council election, The Irish Times described the WIA as having "made a splash" in County Wexford after five alliance-backed candidates were elected to the 34-seat council. The group received 15.9% of first-preference votes across the county.

== Election results ==
=== Wexford County Council ===
Election	FPv	%	Seats	±
2024	10,223 (#4)	15.9%	5 / 34	new
