= 2024 Wexford County Council election =

Part of the 2024 Irish local elections

- 7 June 2024

All 34 seats on Wexford County Council 18 seats needed for a majority
	First party	Second party	Third party
Party	Fianna Fáil	Fine Gael	Wexford Ind. Alliance
Last election	12	9	New
Seats won	9	8	5
Seat change	▼3	▼1	▲5
	Fourth party	Fifth party	Sixth party
Party	Sinn Féin	Labour	Aontú
Last election	2	2	1
Seats won	3	2	1
Seat change	▲1	Steady	Steady
	Seventh party
Party	Independent
Last election	8
Seats won	6
Seat change	▼2
- Results by Local Electoral Area

An election to all 34 seats on Wexford County Council was held on 7 June 2024 as part of the 2024 Irish local elections. County Wexford is divided into 6 local electoral areas (LEAs) to elect councillors for a five-year term of office on the electoral system of proportional representation by means of the single transferable vote (PR-STV).

Voting took place in 197 polling booths across 6 local electoral areas on 7th June, which coincided with voting for the 2024 European elections in the constituency of Ireland South.

Counting of votes took place from 8th-10th of June in St. Joseph's Community Centre in Wexford town. Counting of votes was suspended 10pm on Sunday 9th after the Sixth count in the Enniscorthy electoral area, due to a request for a recount from Wexford Independent Alliance candidate Cyril Wheelock following the discovery of a vote with two first preferences indicated on it, which should have been deemed a spoiled vote, which would have reduced the number of votes separating the two lowest remaining candidates to just 4 votes.

Counting resumed 11am Monday following a review of the 2nd preference votes of the candidate with the next lowest votes, Sinn Fein's Colette Nolan, determined there would not be any effect on the outcome of the election.

A recount was also called in the Rosslare area.

== Retiring incumbents ==
The following councillors did not seek re-election:

Constituency	Departing Councillor	Party
Enniscorthy	Kathleen Codd-Nolan	Fine Gael
Gorey	Diarmuid Devereux	Fine Gael
Rosslare	Jim Moore	Fine Gael
Wexford	Maura Bell	Labour
Wexford	John Hegarty	Fine Gael

== Results by party ==
Party	Candidates	Seats	±	1st pref	FPv%	±%
Fianna Fáil	14	9	▼3	16,500	25.72	▼4.31
Fine Gael	10	8	▼1	11,826	18.43	▼6.66
Wexford Ind. Alliance	12	5	New	10,223	15.93	New
Sinn Féin	11	3	▲1	7,039	10.97	▲3.42
Labour	6	2	Steady	4,421	6.89	▼1.99
Aontú	1	1	Steady	2,455	3.83	▲2.14
Green	2	0	New	586	0.92	New
Ireland First	1	0	New	389	0.61	New
The Irish People	1	0	New	145	0.23	New
People Before Profit	1	0	Steady	133	0.21	▼1.58
National Party	1	0	New	125	0.19	New
Independent	12	6	▼2	10,312	16.07	▼5.42
Total	72	34	Steady	64,154	100.00	—N/a

The Wexford Independent Alliance is a team of candidates associated with the Independent politician TD Verona Murphy

== Results by local electoral area ==
*: Outgoing councillor elected in 2019.
†: Outgoing councillor co-opted subsequent to the 2019 election.

=== Enniscorthy ===
*Note a recount was called following the discovery of an invalid ballot paper in the transfers following count 6. The request for recount was repealed after review of the transfer pattern for the next proposed elimination revealed there would be no change to the election outcome.

Enniscorthy: 6 Seats
Party	Candidate	FPv%	Count							
Party	Candidate	FPv%	1	2	3	4	5	6	7	8
Fine Gael	Cathal Byrne	20.22	2,275							
Fianna Fáil	Aidan Browne	14.37	1,617							
Fianna Fáil	Barbara-Anne Murphy	11.91	1,340	1,436	1,443	1,481	1,496	1,561	1,564	1,694
Independent	John O'Rourke	10.33	1,162	1,223	1,257	1,289	1,401	1,525	1.526	1,643
Independent	Jackser Owens	10.14	1,141	1,192	1,214	1,261	1,315	1,444	1,446	1,675
Fine Gael	Patrick Kehoe	8.33	937	1,186	1,189	1,226	1,240	1,296	1,297	1,467
Sinn Féin	Colette Nolan	6.16	693	713	882	932	964	1,021	1,022	1,077
Wexford Ind. Alliance	Cyril Wheelock	5.87	660	729	734	754	786	1,016	1,017	
Wexford Ind. Alliance	Majella Wall	5.31	597	658	674	694	740			
Independent	Eamonn Doyle	2.63	296	310	318	334				
Sinn Féin	Alfie Ó Súilleabháin	2.45	276	284						
Green	Brendan Cahill Flynn	2.30	259	297	308					
Electorate: 22,900 Valid: 11,253 Spoilt: 157 Quota: 1,608 Turnout: 11,410 (49.83%)

=== Gorey ===
Gorey: 6 Seats
Party	Candidate	FPv%	Count										
Party	Candidate	FPv%	1	2	3	4	5	6	7	8	9	10	11
Fianna Fáil	Donal Kenny	14.82	1,702										
Wexford Ind. Alliance	Nicky Boland	11.68	1,341	1,350	1,357	1,375	1,475	1,590	1,619	1,686			
Fianna Fáil	Joe Sullivan	11.05	1,269	1,271	1,284	1,316	1,324	1,350	1,378	1,418	1,710		
Fine Gael	Anthony Donohoe	10.23	1,175	1,177	1,191	1,209	1,214	1,237	1,240	1,276	1,399	1,434	1,441
Fine Gael	Darragh McDonald	9.28	1,065	1,069	1,076	1,139	1,146	1,202	1,222	1,344	1,647		
Wexford Ind. Alliance	Jimmy Fleming	8.51	977	984	987	995	1,084	1,156	1,198	1,260	1,386	1,405	1,421
Sinn Féin	Fionntán Ó Súilleabháin	7.44	854	867	870	885	914	971	1,383	1,501	1,594	1,609	1,620
Fianna Fáil	Andrew Bolger	7.41	851	852	861	882	887	929	949	1,048			
Sinn Féin	Kevin Molloy	4.54	521	536	537	552	569	599					
Independent	Cillian Byrne	3.91	449	461	462	485	541						
Labour	Lorna Fitzpatrick	3.70	425	448	450	569	575	629	649				
Ireland First	Darren McGovern	3.39	389	391	392	400							
Green	Ann Walsh	2.87	330	361	361								
People Before Profit	Aisling Hudson	1.16	133										
Electorate: 22,114 Valid: 11,481 Spoilt: 100 Quota: 1,641 Turnout: 11,581 (53.37%)

=== Kilmuckridge ===
Kilmuckridge: 4 Seats
Party	Candidate	FPv%	Count			
Party	Candidate	FPv%	1	2	3	4
Independent	Mary Farrell	22.97	1,720			
Fianna Fáil	Pip Breen	19.51	1,461	1,525		
Fine Gael	Oliver Walsh	18.31	1,371	1,421	1,431	1,547
Fianna Fáil	Willie Kavanagh	14.70	1,101	1,116	1,124	1,224
Sinn Féin	Declan Kenny	12.30	921	955	958	
Wexford Ind. Alliance	Paddy Kavanagh	12.21	914	973	979	1,360
Electorate: 14,699 Valid: 7,488 Spoilt: 84 Quota: 1,498 Turnout: 7,572 (51.51%)

=== New Ross ===
New Ross: 6 Seats
Party	Candidate	FPv%	Count							
Party	Candidate	FPv%	1	2	3	4	5	6	7	8
Wexford Ind. Alliance	Pat Barden	15.49	1,900							
Fianna Fáil	John Fleming	10.75	1,318	1,348	1,399	1,452	1,469	1,508	1,574	1,658
Wexford Ind. Alliance	Marty Murphy	10.53	1,292	1,315	1,366	1,399	1,507	1,620	1,712	1,725
Fianna Fáil	Michael Sheehan	10.53	1,291	1,303	1,334	1,403	1,477	1,563	1,884	
Fianna Fáil	Michael Whelan	9.16	1,123	1,130	1,134	1,155	1,407	1,455	1,512	1,543
Fine Gael	Bridín Murphy	8.29	1,017	1,038	1,086	1,173	1,451	1,529	1,645	1,669
Independent	John Dwyer	8.28	1,015	1,022	1,086	1,126	1,148	1,383	1,574	1,608
Independent	Anthony Connick	6.66	817	835	878	930	956	1,039		
Fine Gael	Harry Twomey	6.58	807	817	823	849				
Sinn Féin	Kayley Goodison	6.52	799	804	854	933	947			
Labour	Bridín Lyng-Moloney	3.78	463	469	497					
Independent	Raymond Forte	1.18	145	147						
Independent	Anne Flynn	1.17	143	146						
Independent	James Furlong	1.09	134	137						
Electorate: 23,213 Valid: 12,264 Spoilt: 143 Quota: 1,753 Turnout: 12,407 (53.45%)

=== Rosslare ===
Rosslare: 5 Seats
Party	Candidate	FPv%	Count									
Party	Candidate	FPv%	1	2	3	4	5	6	7	8	9	10
Aontú	Jim Codd	23.89	2,455									
Independent	Ger Carthy	18.97	1,949									
Fine Gael	Frank Staples	13.70	1,408	1,526	1,586	1,591	1,703	1,783				
Fianna Fáil	Lisa McDonald	10.76	1,106	1,201	1,245	1,248	1,277	1,367	1,390	1,611	1,664	1,828
Wexford Ind. Alliance	Joe Druhan	6.84	703	751	803	833	839	869	873	893	923	1,210
Sinn Féin	Aoife Rose O'Brien	5.72	588	681	699	712	717	773	776	821	1,245	1,342
Fianna Fáil	Simon Boyse	4.76	489	570	576	580	620	642	648			
Sinn Féin	Michael Roche	4.70	483	578	590	602	602	641	650	680		
Wexford Ind. Alliance	Jack Barden	4.28	440	569	582	616	640	668	669	816	844	
Labour	Damien Corish	3.26	335	362	382	390	402					
Fine Gael	Willie Fitzharris	1.90	195	235	241	244						
National Party	Jason Murphy	1.22	125	141	146							
Electorate: 18,400 Valid: 10,276 Spoilt: 81 Quota: 1,713 Turnout: 10,357 (56.29%)

=== Wexford ===
Wexford: 7 Seats
Party	Candidate	FPv%	Count										
Party	Candidate	FPv%	1	2	3	4	5	6	7	8	9	10	11
Labour	George Lawlor	20.72	2,361										
Fine Gael	Robbie Staples	13.83	1,576										
Fianna Fáil	Garry Laffan	12.39	1,412	1,499									
Independent	Leonard Kelly	11.77	1,341	1,492									
Sinn Féin	Tom Forde	10.09	1,150	1,217	1,225	1,229	1,237	1,378	1,388	1,427			
Wexford Ind. Alliance	Dave Ryan	4.60	524	547	585	594	633	644	646	754	801	845	
Wexford Ind. Alliance	Raymond Shannon	4.45	507	541	546	547	580	586	591	662	758	897	1,180
Sinn Féin	Davy Hynes	4.30	490	534	539	547	552	611	615	654	710		
Labour	Catherine Walsh	3.73	425	674	697	711	715	723	741	795	892	1,002	1,092
Fianna Fáil	Emmet Moloney	3.69	420	468	495	514	515	517	523	557			
Labour	Vicky Clancy-Barron	3.62	412	586	609	622	624	644	657	706	771	878	986
Wexford Ind. Alliance	Michelle O'Neill	3.23	368	410	428	433	449	460	469				
Sinn Féin	Lorraine Smyth	2.32	264	277	280	281	283						
The Irish People	Stephen Power	1.27	145	149	150	150							
Electorate: 23,333 Valid: 11,395 Spoilt: 118 Quota: 1,425 Turnout: 11,513 (49.34%)

== Changes ==
=== Co-options ===
Party	Outgoing	LEA	Reason	Date	Co-optee
Sinn Féin	Fionntán Ó Súilleabháin	Gorey	Elected to 34th Dáil for Wicklow–Wexford at the 2024 general election	16 December 2024	Craig Doyle
Labour	George Lawlor	Wexford	Elected to 34th Dáil for Wexford at the 2024 general election	16 December 2024	Vicky Clancy Barron
Fine Gael	Cathal Byrne	Enniscorthy	Elected to 27th Seanad at the 2025 Seanad election	31 January 2025	Patricia Byrne

=== Changes in affiliation ===
Name	LEA	Elected as	New affiliation	Date
Michael Sheehan	New Ross	Fianna Fáil	Independent	4 November 2024
Joe Sullivan	Gorey	Fianna Fáil	Independent	26 June 2026
Michael Sheehan	New Ross	Independent	Independent Ireland	1 September 2026
