= Poppel (village) =

- Village
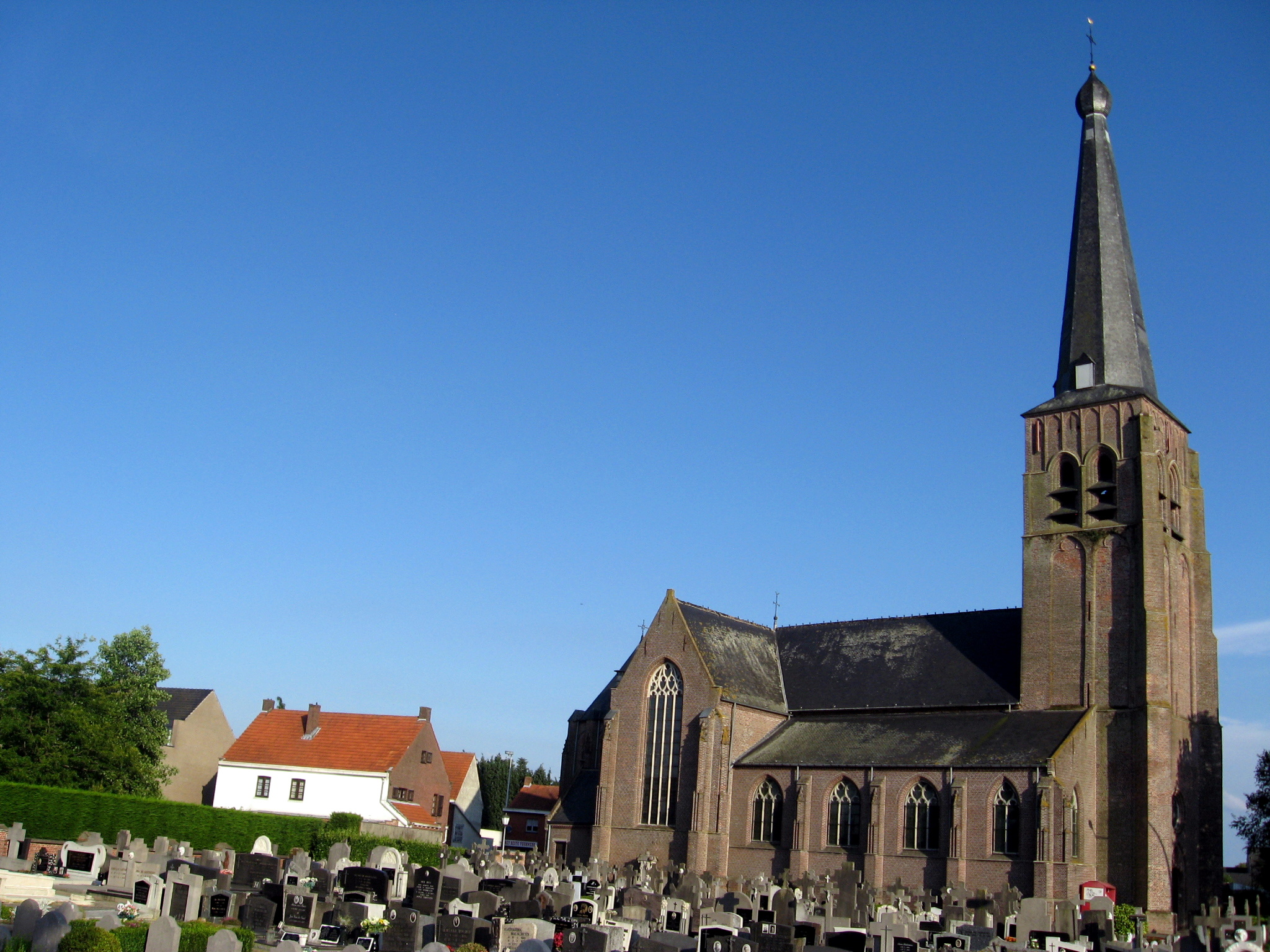
- Church of Saint Valentine

- Location in Belgium
- Coordinates: 51.4461°N 5.0403°E
- Country: Belgium
- Region: Flemish Region
- Province: Antwerp
- Municipality: Ravels

Area
  - Total: 28.02 km^{2} (10.82 sq mi)

Population (2021)
  - Total: 3,489
  - Density: 124.5/km^{2} (322.5/sq mi)
- Time zone: CET

Poppel is a village in the municipality of Ravels, in the province of Antwerp, Belgium. As of 2021, it was home to 3,489 people. Poppel was a municipality until 1977. Poppel borders the Dutch province of North Brabant.

Poppel used to be located in a large heath area, however cultivation have transformed into forests and agricultural land. It used to be a domain of the Duchy of Brabant. In 1347, Poppel and nine other villages became part of the Land of Turnhout within Antwerp. Poppel was an independent municipality until 1977 when it was merged into Ravels.
