= List of Cork intermediate hurling team captains =

This article lists players who have captained the Cork intermediate hurling team in the Munster Intermediate Hurling Championship and the All-Ireland Intermediate Hurling Championship.

== List of captains ==
Year	Player	Club	National	Provincial
2013	Martin Coleman	Ballinhassig		
2014	John O'Callaghan	Inniscarra	All-Ireland Hurling Final winning captain	Munster Hurling Final winning captain
2015	Kevin Kavanagh	Carrigaline		Munster Hurling Final winning captain
2016	Brian Murray	Bishopstown		
2017	Shane O'Donovan	Mayfield		Munster Hurling Final winning captain
2018	Michael Russell	Aghada	All-Ireland Hurling Final winning captain	

== See also ==
- List of Cork senior hurling team captains
- List of Cork under-21 hurling team captains
- List of Cork minor hurling team captains
