= Cormac Murphy =

Irish hurler

Personal information
- Native name: Cormac Ó Murchú (Irish)
- Born: 21 April 1993 (age 33) Mallow, County Cork, Ireland
- Occupation: Technical analyst
- Height: 6 ft 1 in (185 cm)

Sport
- Sport: Hurling
- Position: Left wing-back
Club
- Years: Club
- 2010-present: Mallow
Club titles
	Football	Hurling
Cork titles	0	0
College
- Years: College
- 2011-2016: University College Cork
College titles
- Fitzgibbon titles: 1
Inter-county*
Years	County	Apps (scores)
2014-present	Cork	7 (0-03)
Inter-county titles
- Munster titles: 0
- All-Irelands: 0
- NHL: 0
- All Stars: 0
- *Inter County team apps and scores correct as of 19:58, 14 January 2018.

Cormac Murphy (born 21 April 1993) is an Irish hurler who plays for Cork Premier Championship club Mallow and at inter-county level with the Cork senior hurling team. He currently plays as a right wing-forward, but can also be deployed as a wing-back.

== Playing career ==
=== University College Cork ===
During his studies at University College Cork, Murphy was selected for the college's senior hurling team on a number of occasions. On 2 March 2013, he was an unused substitute when the university defeated Mary Immaculate College by 2–17 to 2–12 to win the Fitzgibbon Cup.

=== Mallow ===
Murphy joined the Mallow club at a young age and played in all grades at juvenile and underage levels, enjoying championship success in under-14 and under-16 grades. He later won North Cork Under-21 Championship medals as a hurler in 2013 and as a Gaelic footballer in 2014.

=== Cork ===
==== Minor and under-21 ====
Murphy made his only appearance for the Cork minor hurling team on 27 April 2011 in a 2–14 to 0-12 Munster Championship defeat by Limerick.

On 6 June 2012, Murphy made his first appearance for the Cork under-21 team in a one-point defeat by Tipperary in the Munster Championship. His three seasons in this grade also ended without silverware.

==== Intermediate ====
After lining out for the Cork senior team in the early part of 2014, Murphy was also added to the Cork intermediate team and made his first appearance in a 1–21 to 3-09 Munster Championship defeat of Waterford on 25 May. He later won a Munster Championship medal on 25 June after a 4–15 to 2–08 defeat of Tipperary in the final.

On 28 July 2018, Murphy scored three points from centre-forward in Cork's 2–19 to 0-18 All-Ireland final defeat of Wexford.

==== Senior ====
Murphy was added to the extended training panel of the Cork senior team just before the start of the 2014 Munster Championship. He made his first appearance for the team on 14 February 2015 in a 1–22 to 2-17 National Hurling League defeat by Kilkenny. On 3 May, Murphy was at left wing-back for Cork's 1–24 to 0–17 defeat by Waterford in the National League final. He made his first championship start in a 3–19 to 1-21 Munster Championship defeat by Waterford on 7 June. Murphy opted out of the Cork panel prior to the start of the 2018 season.

In November 2018, Murphy was recalled to the Cork senior panel for the 2019 season.

== Career statistics ==
=== Inter-county ===
As of match played 27 January 2019.

Team	Year	Munster League		National League		Munster		All-Ireland		Total	
Team	Year	Apps	Score	Apps	Score	Apps	Score	Apps	Score	Apps	Score
Cork	2014	—		—		—		—		—	
Cork	2015	—		7	0-04	1	0-00	3	0-02	11	0-06
Cork	2016	2	0-00	6	0-03	1	0-01	2	0-00	11	0-04
Cork	2017	4	0-01	1	0-00	—		—		5	0-01
Cork	2018	—		—		—		—		—	
Cork	2019	2	0-04	1	0-04	0	0-00	0	0-00	3	0-08
Total		8	0-05	15	0-11	2	0-01	5	0-02	30	0-19

== Honours ==
University College Cork

- Fitzgibbon Cup (1): 2013

Mallow

- North Cork Under-21 Football Championship (1): 2014
- North Cork Under-21 Hurling Championship (1): 2013
- North Cork Under-16 Hurling Championship (1) 2009

Cork

- All-Ireland Intermediate Hurling Championship (1): 2018
- Munster Intermediate Hurling Championship (1): 2014
