= Billy Ryan (hurler) =

Irish hurler (born 1996)

Personal information
- Native name: Liam Ó Riain (Irish)
- Born: 21 July 1996 (age 30) Graigue, County Kilkenny, Ireland
- Occupation: Student
- Height: 6 ft 0 in (183 cm)

Sport
- Sport: Hurling
- Position: Centre-forward
Club
- Years: Club
- Graigue–Ballycallan
Club titles
- Kilkenny titles: 0
College
- Years: College
- St. Patrick's College
College titles
- Fitzgibbon titles: 0
Inter-county*
Years	County	Apps (scores)
2017–present	Kilkenny	15 (1-12)
Inter-county titles
- Leinster titles: 4
- All-Irelands: 0
- NHL: 0
- All Stars: 0
- *Inter County team apps and scores correct as of 22:10, 17 July 2021.

Billy Ryan (born 21 July 1996) is an Irish hurler who plays for Kilkenny Senior Championship club Graigue–Ballycallan and at inter-county level with the Kilkenny senior hurling team. He usually lines out as a centre-forward.

== Playing career ==
=== St. Kieran's College ===
Ryan first came to prominence as a hurler with St. Kieran's College in Kilkenny. Having played in every grade as a hurler, he was eventually called up the college's senior team. On 9 March 2014, Ryan scored a point from right corner-forward when St. Kieran's College suffered a 2–13 to 0–13 defeat by Kilkenny CBS in the Leinster final. On 5 April 2014, Ryan was dropped from the starting fifteen for the All-Ireland final against Kilkenny CBS. He came on as a substitute for Brian Cody and collected a winners' medal following the 2–16 to 0–13 victory.

On 28 February 2015, Ryan won a Leinster Championship medal after scoring two points when St. Kieran's College defeated St. Peter's College by 1–14 to 1–06 in the final. He was selected at full-forward when St. Kieran's College faced Thurles CBS in the All-Ireland final. Ryan scored three points and collected a second successive winner's medal following the 1–15 to 1–12 victory.

=== Graigue–Ballycallan ===
Ryan joined the Graigue–Ballycallan club at a young age and played in all grades at juvenile and underage levels before eventually joining the club's top adult team in the Kilkenny Intermediate Championship.

On 28 October 2018, Ryan lined out at right wing-forward when Graigue–Ballycallan faced Tullaroan in the Kilkenny Intermediate Championship final. He scored three points from play and ended the game with a winners' medal following the 2–16 to 2–13 victory. Ryan was again selected at right wing-forward for the Leinster final on 1 December 2018 but spent much of the game at full-forward. He was held scoreless throughout the game but ended with a winners' medal following the 2–17 to 0–15 defeat of Portlaoise.

=== Kilkenny ===
==== Minor and under-21 ====
Ryan was selected for the Kilkenny minor team for the first time during the 2013 Leinster Championship. On 7 July 2013, he won a Leinster Championship medal as an unused substitute following a 1–18 to 0–08 defeat of Laois in the final.

On 6 July 2014, Ryan lined out at left wing-forward when Kilkenny faced Dublin in the Leinster final. He collected a second winners' medal - his first on the field of play - following a 2–19 to 2–10 victory. Ryan was dropped from the starting fifteen for the All-Ireland final against Limerick on 7 September 2014. He came on as a substitute for Ross Butler at centre-forward and ended the game with a winners' medal following the 2–17 to 0–19 victory.

Ryan was added to the Kilkenny under-21 panel prior to the start of the 2016 Leinster Championship. He made his first appearance in that grade on 25 May 2016 when scored three points from right corner-forward in Kilkenny's 1–11 to 0–12 defeat by Westmeath.

On 5 July 2017, Ryan won a Leinster Championship medal with the under-21 team after scoring two points in a 0–30 to 1–15 defeat of Wexford in the final. On 9 September 2017, he was again at left corner-forward for the All-Ireland final against Limerick. Ryan scored a point from play in the 0–17 to 0–11 defeat.

==== Intermediate ====
Ryan was drafted onto the Kilkenny intermediate team in advance of the 2015 Leinster Championship. He made his first appearance for the team on 1 July 2015 when he lined out at left wing-forward in a 3–22 to 1–17 defeat by Galway.

On 13 July 2016, Ryan lined out at full-forward when Kilkenny faced Wexford in the Leinster final. He scored a key goal and collected a winners' medal following the 3–14 to 2–14 victory. Ryan was switched to right corner-forward for the All-Ireland final against Clare on 6 August 2016. He scored 1-04 from play and collected a winners' medal following the 5–16 to 1–16 victory.

==== Senior ====
Ryan became a member of the extended training panel with the Kilkenny senior team at the start of the 2017 season. He remained on the panel for the year but made no competitive appearances.

On 18 February 2018, Ryan made his first appearance for the Kilkenny senior team when he lined out at right corner-forward in a 1–20 to 0–12 defeat of Waterford in the National League. On 8 April 2018, he won a National League medal as a member of the extended panel following Kilkenny's 2–23 to 2–17 defeat of Tipperary in the final. Ryan was selected at right corner-forward when Kilkenny faced Galway in the Leinster final on 1 July 2018. He was substituted before the end of the 0-18 apiece draw. Ryan was switched to full-forward for the replay a week later, however, he was once again substituted in the 1–28 to 3–15 defeat.

On 30 June 2019, Ryan was selected on the bench when Kilkenny faced Wexford in the Leinster final. He was introduced as a substitute for Walter Walsh but ended on the losing side following the 1–23 to 0–23 defeat. On 18 August 2019, Ryan was again listed amongst the substitutes when Kilkenny faced Tipperary in the All-Ireland final. He was introduced as a substitute for Adrian Mullen and scored two points in the 3–25 to 0–20 defeat.

== Career statistics ==
As of 17 July 2021

Team	Year	National League			Leinster		All-Ireland		Total	
Team	Year	Division	Apps	Score	Apps	Score	Apps	Score	Apps	Score
Kilkenny	2017	Division 1A	0	0-00	0	0-00	0	0-00	0	0-00
Kilkenny	2018	Division 1A	1	0-00	2	0-02	1	0-00	4	0-02
Kilkenny	2019	Division 1A	6	1-07	5	0-04	3	0-04	14	1-15
Kilkenny	2020	Division 1B	5	4-02	1	1-01	1	0-00	7	5-03
Kilkenny	2021	Division 1B	3	1-07	2	0-01	0	0-00	5	1-08
Career total			15	6-16	10	1-08	5	0-04	30	7-28

== Honours ==
St. Kieran's College

- All-Ireland Colleges Senior Hurling Championship: 2014, 2015
- Leinster Colleges Senior Hurling Championship: 2015

Graigue–Ballycallan

- Leinster Intermediate Club Hurling Championship: 2018
- Kilkenny Intermediate Hurling Championship: 2018

Kilkenny

- Leinster Senior Hurling Championship: 2020, 2021
- All-Ireland Intermediate Hurling Championship: 2016
- Leinster Intermediate Hurling Championship: 2016
- Leinster Under-21 Hurling Championship: 2017
- All-Ireland Minor Hurling Championship: 2014
- Leinster Minor Hurling Championship: 2013, 2014
