= Tomás Ryan =

Irish hurler

Personal information
- Native name: Tomás Ó Riain (Irish)
- Nickname: Thomasheen
- Born: 1944 (age 81–82) Dripsey, County Cork, Ireland
- Occupation: Retired politician
- Height: 5 ft 8 in (173 cm)

Sport
- Sport: Hurling
- Position: Right wing-forward
Clubs
Years	Club	Apps (scores)
1961-1985 1964-1977	Inniscarra → Muskerry	25 (6-119)
Club titles
- Cork titles: 0
Inter-county
Years	County	Apps (scores)
1968-1972	Cork	9 (2-15)
Inter-county titles
- Munster titles: 2
- All-Irelands: 1
- NHL: 3

Thomas F. Ryan (born 1944), better known as Tomás Ryan, is an Irish retired hurler and politician. At club level he played with Inniscarra and divisional side Muskerry and was also a member of the Cork senior hurling team. Ryan also spent 30 years as an elected representative with Cork County Council.

== Club career ==
Ryan began a lifelong association with the Inniscarra as a schoolboy in 1955. After progressing through the juvenile and underage ranks he eventually joined the adult ranks as a member of the club's junior team. Ryan enjoyed his first success in 1965 when Inniscarra secured the Mid Cork JAHC title before claiming a second divisional title in 1968. His performances at club level resulted in his inclusion on the Muskerry divisional team. He was frequently the team's top scorer in the Cork SHC, including 1970 when Muskerry were beaten by University College Cork in the final. Ryan won a third Mid Cork title as team captain in 1975, a victory which was later converted into a Cork JHC title after a win over Ballymartle.

== Inter-county career ==
Ryan never played at minor or under-21 levels with Cork, but was drafted onto the intermediate team in 1966. He won a Munster Championship medal in this grade in 1967, however, Cork were beaten by London in the 1967 All-Ireland intermediate final. Ryan's performances for the intermediate team lead to a call-up to the Cork senior hurling team for the 1967-68 National League and he made his debut in a 5-13 to 6-03 first-round win over Galway. He made his championship debut later that season when he came on as a substitute and scored a goal in the 1968 Munster final defeat by Tipperary.

Ryan claimed his first senior inter-county silverware when Cork secured the 1968-69 National League title. He was a first-team regular for Cork's subsequent Munster Championship-winning campaign. Ryan subsequently lined out at right wing-forward in the 1969 All-Ireland final defeat by Kilkenny. He won a second consecutive National League title in 1970 before securing a second consecutive Munster Championship after a defeat of Tipperary in the final. Ryan was again at right wing-forward for the subsequent series of games and ended the season with All-Ireland success after a 6-21 to 5-10 win over Wexford in the 1970 All-Ireland final.

A leg injury sustained in a farming accident ruled Ryan out of the 1971 Munster Championship. He returned for the 1971-72 National League but was dropped completely from the panel before the quarter-final against Galway in a move which effectively ended his inter-county career.

== Political career ==
Ryan was elected to Cork County Council as a Fine Gael candidate in the 1979 local elections. He was re-elected at every subsequent election until his retirement in 2009, during which time he also served a term as chairman. Ryan was also an unsuccessful candidate in the Cork North-Central constituency at three general elections.

== Honours ==
Inniscarra

- Cork Junior Hurling Championship: 1975 (c)
- Mid Cork Junior A Hurling Championship: 1965, 1968, 1975 (c)

Cork

- All-Ireland Senior Hurling Championship: 1970
- Munster Senior Hurling Championship: 1969, 1970
- National Hurling League: 1968-69, 1969-70, 1971-72
- Munster Intermediate Hurling Championship: 1967

Political offices
Preceded by Kevin Murphy	Chairman of Cork County Council; 1999–2000	Succeeded by John Mulvihill
