= 2017 All-Ireland Intermediate Hurling Championship =

Championship Details
- Dates: 12 July 2017 – 23 July 2017
- Teams: 3

All Ireland Champions
- Winners: Kilkenny (5th win)
- Captain: Darragh Brennan
- Manager: Anthony McCormack

All Ireland Runners-up
- Runners-up: Cork
- Captain: Shane O'Donovan
- Manager: Ronan Dwane

Provincial Champions
- Munster: Cork
- Leinster: Kilkenny
- Ulster: Not Played
- Connacht: Not Played

Championship Statistics
- Matches Played: 2
- Total Goals: 6 (3.00 per game)
- Total Points: 75 (37.50 per game)
- Top Scorer: Robbie Hennelly (1-20)

The 2017 All-Ireland Intermediate Hurling Championship was the 34th staging of the All-Ireland Intermediate Hurling Championship since its establishment by the Gaelic Athletic Association in 1961. The championship began on 12 July 2017 and ended on 23 July 2017.

Kilkenny entered the championship as the defending champions.

On 23 July 2017, Kilkenny won the championship following a 2–23 to 2–18 defeat of Cork in the All-Ireland final. This was their fifth championship overall and their second title in succession.

== Teams ==
=== Overview ===
2017 championship saw the fewest teams participating in recent years. The Munster Intermediate Hurling Championship was not held as only Cork were interested in fielding a team (the Munster IHC was replaced in 2017 by a new Under 25 competition which was won by Limerick).

=== Summaries ===
Team	Colours	Most recent success	
Team	Colours	All-Ireland	Provincial
Cork	Red and white	2014	2015
Kilkenny	Black and amber	2016	2016
Wexford	Purple and gold	2004	2014

== Provincial championships ==
=== Leinster Intermediate Hurling Championship ===
Final

12 July 2017
19:30
Final

Kilkenny	1-26 - 1-8	Wexford
R Donnelly 0-9 (3f, 1 '65'), P Holden 1-5, D Brennan 0-5, S Carey 0-2, C Fleming, JP Treacy, E Delaney, M Power, J Power 0-1 each.	Report	J Hobbs 0-5 (5f), S Murphy 1-0, J Doyle 0-2, L French 0-1.

Nowlan Park, Kilkenny
Referee: J O'Brien (Laois)

== All-Ireland Intermediate Hurling Championship ==
Final

23 July 2017
14:00
Final

Cork	2-18 - 2-23	Kilkenny
S Hayes 0-6 (0-5f, 0-1 sideline), R O’Shea 1-2 (0-1f), W Leahy 0-4, J O’Neill 1-1, M Collins, D Drake 0-2 each, D Flynn 0-1.	Report	R Donnelly 1-11 (0-9f, 1-0 pen), E Delaney 0-4, M Keoghan, P Holden 0-3 each, T Phelan 1-0, J Cahill, M Power 0-1 each.

Páirc Uí Chaoimh, Cork
Referee: C Cunning (Antrim)

== Scoring statistics ==
Top scorers overall

Rank	Player	County	Tally	Total	Matches	Average
1	Robbie Donnelly	Kilkenny	1-20	23	2	11.50
2	Paul Holden	Kilkenny	1-08	11	2	5.50
3	Seán Hayes	Cork	0-06	6	1	6.00

Top scorers in a single game

Rank	Player	County	Tally	Total	Opposition
1	Robbie Donnelly	Kilkenny	1-11	14	Cork
2	Robbie Donnelly	Kilkenny	0-09	9	Wexford
3	Paul Holden	Kilkenny	1-05	8	Wexford
4	Seán Hayes	Cork	0-06	6	Kilkenny
5	Rob O'Shea	Cork	1-02	5	Kilkenny
5	Darragh Brennan	Kilkenny	0-05	5	Wexford
5	Jack Hobbs	Wexford	0-05	5	Kilkenny
8	Jerry O'Neill	Cork	1-01	4	Kilkenny
8	Willie Leahy	Cork	0-04	4	Kilkenny
8	Edmond Delaney	Kilkenny	0-04	4	Cork
