= Derek Barrett =

Irish hurler & coach (born 1977)

Personal information
- Native name: Deiric Bairéid (Irish)
- Born: 4 February 1977 (age 49) Cobh, County Cork, Ireland
- Occupation: Process operator
- Height: 5 ft 11 in (180 cm)

Sport
- Sport: Hurling
- Position: Right wing-back
Clubs
- Years: Club
- Cobh; Imokilly
Club titles
- Cork titles: 2
Inter-county*
Years	County	Apps (scores)
1996-2003	Cork	10 (0-02)
Inter-county titles
- Munster titles: 3
- All-Irelands: 1
- NHL: 1
- All Stars: 0
- *Inter County team apps and scores correct as of 21:01, 16 April 2019.

Derek Barrett (born 4 February 1977) is an Irish hurling coach and former player. He is the coach of Cork Senior Championship division Imokilly. Barrett had a lengthy career with East Cork club Cobh while he also played for the Cork senior hurling team for eight years, during which time he usually lined out as a right wing-back.

Barrett began his hurling and Gaelic football career at club level with Cobh. He enjoyed his greatest success in 1994 when he was part of the Cork Minor Football Championship-winning team. Barrett's prowess also saw him selected for the Imokilly divisional hurling team with whom he won back-to-back Cork Hurling Championship medals in 1997 and 1998.

At inter-county level, Barrett was part of the successful Cork minor team that won the All-Ireland Championship in 1995 before later winning back-to-back All-Ireland Championships with the under-21 team in 1997 and 1998. After one season with the Cork junior team he won an All-Ireland Championship with the intermediate team in 1997. Barrett joined the Cork senior team in 1996. From his debut, he usually lined out in the half-back line and made 10 Championship appearances in a career that ended with his last game in 2003. During that time Barrett was part of Cork's All-Ireland Championship-winning team in 1999. He also secured three Munster Championship medals and a National Hurling League medal.

Barrett is one of only a handful of players to have won the complete set of Munster Championship medals - minor, under-21, junior, intermediate and senior. At inter-provincial level, he was selected to play in two championship campaigns with Munster, with Railway Cup medals being won on both occasion in 2000 and 2001.

== Career statistics ==
Team	Year	National League			Munster		All-Ireland		Total	
Team	Year	Division	Apps	Score	Apps	Score	Apps	Score	Apps	Score
Cork	1995-96	Division 1	x	x-xx	0	0-00	—		x	x-xx
Cork	1997	Division 1	x	x-xx	—		—		x	x-xx
Cork	1998	Division 1B	x	x-xx	0	0-00	—		x	x-xx
Cork	1999	Division 1B	x	x-xx	0	0-00	0	0-00	x	x-xx
Cork	2000	Division 1B	x	x-xx	3	0-01	1	0-01	x	x-xx
Cork	2001	Division 1B	3	0-00	1	0-00	—		4	0-00
Cork	2002	Division 1B	7	0-00	1	0-00	2	0-00	10	0-00
Cork	2003	Division 1B	4	0-02	1	0-00	1	0-00	6	0-02

== Honours ==
=== Player ===
Cobh

- Cork Minor A Football Championship (1): 1994

Imokilly

- Cork Senior Hurling Championship (1): 1997, 1998

Cork

- All-Ireland Senior Hurling Championship (1): 1999
- Munster Senior Hurling Championship (3): 1999, 2000, 2003
- National Hurling League (1): 1998
- All-Ireland Intermediate Hurling Championship (1): 1997
- Munster Intermediate Hurling Championship (1): 1997
- Munster Junior Hurling Championship (1): 1996
- All-Ireland Under-21 Hurling Championship (2): 1997, 1998
- Munster Under-21 Hurling Championship (3): 1996, 1997, 1998
- All-Ireland Minor Hurling Championship (1): 1995
- Munster Minor Hurling Championship (2): 1994, 1995

=== Management ===
Cobh

- East Cork Junior A Hurling Championship (1): 2025

Imokilly

- Cork Senior Hurling Championship (1): 2017, 2018
