= Fergal Healy =

Galway hurler

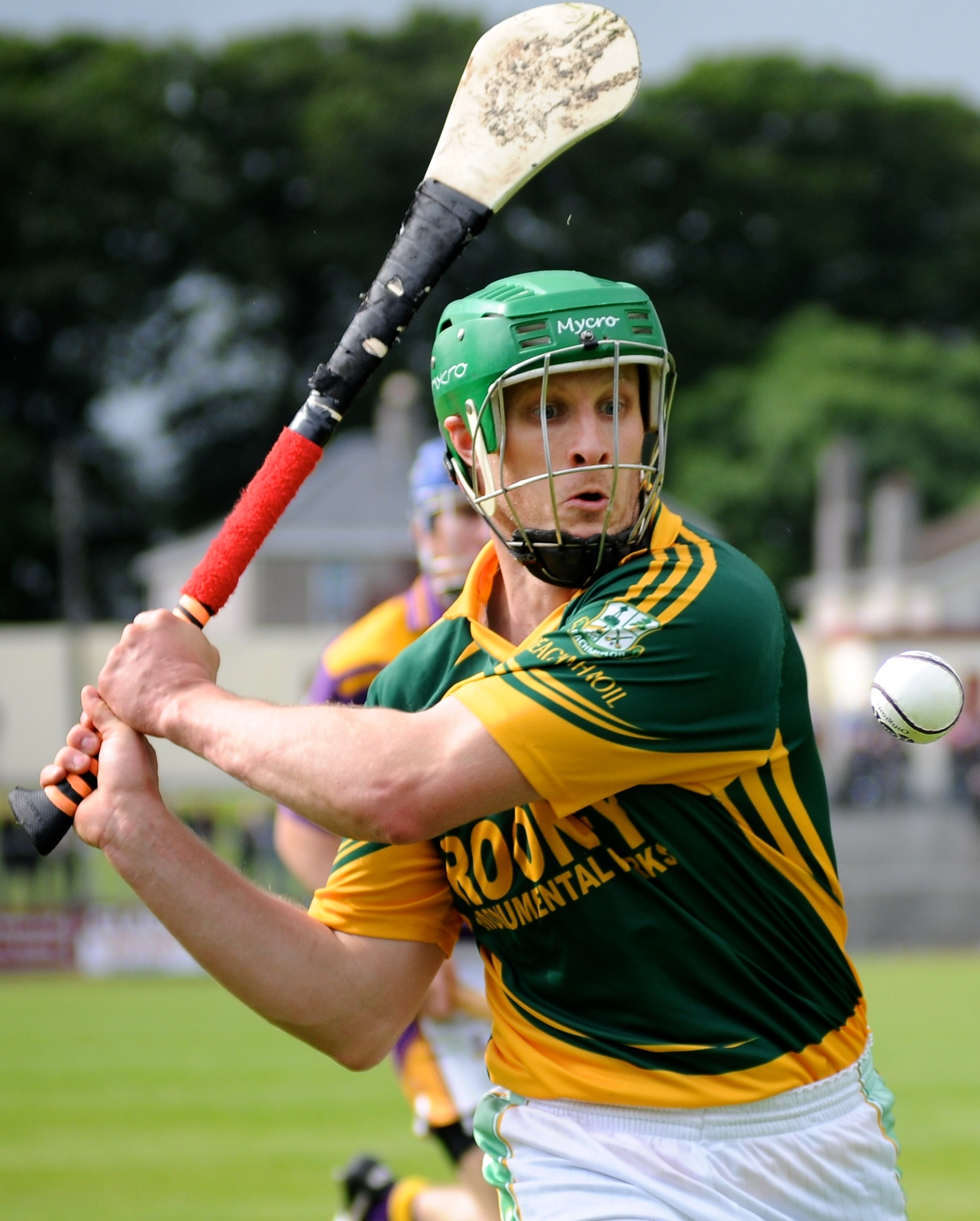
- Fergal Healy in action for Craughwell in 2013

Personal information
- Native name: Feargall Ó hÉilí (Irish)
- Born: 21 September 1977 (age 49) Craughwell, County Galway, Ireland
- Occupation: Process engineer
- Height: 5 ft 9 in (175 cm)

Sport
- Sport: Hurling
- Position: Midfield
Club
- Years: Club
- Craughwell
Club titles
- Galway titles: 0
College
- Years: College
- University of Limerick
College titles
- Fitzgibbon titles: 0
Inter-county
- Years: County
- 1997–2009: Galway
Inter-county titles
- Leinster titles: 0
- All-Irelands: 0
- NHL: 2
- All Stars: 0

Fergal Healy (born 21 September 1977) is an Irish former hurler and manager. At club level he played with Craughwell, and also lined out at inter-county level with various Galway teams.

== Playing career ==
Born in Craughwell, County Galway, Healy first played hurling as a student at Loughrea Vocational School. He was part of the school's team that won the All-Ireland Vocational Schools JHC title after a defeat of Killenaule VS in 1994. As a member of the Galway vocational team, Healy won three consecutive All-Ireland titles.

Healy first played for the Craughwell club at juvenile and underage levels. He lined out in under-14 and under-16 finals before helping the club to an under-21 title in 1997. Healy was part of the Craughwell intermediate team that lost Galway IHC finals in 1996 and 1998.

Healy first appeared on the inter-county scene with Galway during a three-year tenure with the minor team. After losing the All-Ireland minor final to Kilkenny in 1993, he claimed a winners' medal a year later after a defeat of Cork. Healy later spent three years with the under-21 team, winning an All-Ireland medal in 1996 before losing consecutive finals to Cork.

As a member of Galway's junior team, Healy was at left wing-forward when Galway beat Kilkenny in the 1996 All-Ireland junior final. He later won an All-Ireland IHC medal as Kilkenny were once again beaten in 1999. By that stage Healy had already joined the senior team, however, it took a few years before he became a regular member of the team. He won a National League medal in 2000 before lining out in Galway's defeat by Tipperary in the 2001 All-Ireland final.

Healy claimed a second league title in 2004 but was again denied an All-Ireland medal when Cork beat Galway in the 2005 All-Ireland final. In spite of this, he won a Railway Cup medal with Connacht in 2004. Healy continued to line out with Galway until 2009.

== Coaching career ==
Healy had been involved in coaching at all levels with Craughwell, including a spell as senior team manager in 2019. That year he also served as a selector with the Galway minor team that won the All-Ireland MHC title. Healy was later promoted to senior team selector before being appointed Galway minor team manager in December 2021.

== Honours ==
=== Player ===
Loughrea Vocational School

- All-Ireland Vocational Schools Junior Hurling Championship: 1994

Galway

- National Hurling League: 2000, 2004
- All-Ireland Intermediate Hurling Championship: 1999
- Connacht Intermediate Hurling Championship: 1997, 1998
- All-Ireland Junior Hurling Championship: 1996
- All-Ireland Under-21 Hurling Championship: 1996
- All-Ireland Minor Hurling Championship: 1994
- All-Ireland Vocational Schools Senior Hurling Championship: 1993, 1994, 1995

Munster

- Interprovincial Hurling Championship: 2004

=== Management ===
Galway

- All-Ireland Minor Hurling Championship: 2019
- Leinster Minor Hurling Championship: 2023
