= 1997 All-Ireland Intermediate Hurling Championship =

Championship Details
- Dates: 25 May – 11 October 1997
- Teams: 19

All Ireland Champions
- Winners: Cork (2nd win)
- Captain: Pat Mulcahy
- Manager: Ted O'Mahony

All Ireland Runners-up
- Runners-up: Galway
- Captain: Noel Power
- Manager: Micheál Linnane

Provincial Champions
- Munster: Cork
- Leinster: Kilkenny
- Ulster: Derry
- Connacht: Galway

Championship Statistics
- Matches Played: 19
- Total Goals: 60 (3.15 per game)
- Total Points: 451 (23.73 per game)
- Top Scorer: Ollie O'Connor (4-26)

The 1997 All-Ireland Intermediate Hurling Championship was the 14th staging of the All-Ireland Intermediate Hurling Championship since its establishment by the Gaelic Athletic Association in 1961. It was the first championship to be staged in 24 years. The championship ran from 25 May to 11 October 1997.

The All-Ireland final was played at the Gaelic Grounds in Limerick on 11 October 1997 between Cork and Galway, in what was their first ever meeting in the final. Cork won the match by 2-11 to 1-12 to claim a second All-Ireland title overall and a first title in 32 years.

Kilenny's Ollie O'Connor was the championship's top scorer with 4-26.

== Connacht Intermediate Hurling Championship ==
=== Connacht final ===
| 19 July 1997 Final | Galway | 7-19 - 1-07 | Roscommon | Kenny Park |
| | B Larkin 3-1, F Healy 1-4, R Ganley 1-4, M Connolly 1-3, N Kenny 1-0, M Forde 0-3, M Kenny 0-2, L Hogan 0-1, P Forde 0-1. | | B Boyle 0-7, C Kelly 1-0. |

== Leinster Intermediate Hurling Championship ==
=== Leinster quarter-finals ===
| 21 June 1997 Quarter-final | Wicklow | 1-12 - 1-02 | Westmeath | Aughrim County Ground |
| | J O'Neill 1-2, J Keogh 0-3, MA O'Neill 0-3, D Highland 0-2, E King 0-1, J O'Toole 0-1. | | B Kennedy 1-0, D Scally 0-2. |

| 21 June 1997 Quarter-final | Wexford | 1-05 - 1-15 | Carlow | St. Patrick's Park |
| | T Tonks 1-0, C McGrath 0-2, J Mackey 0-1, D Kelly 0-1, M Foley 0-1, | | M Mullins 0-4, P Coady 0-4, K Nolan 1-0, D Doyle 0-2, J Hayden 0-2, J Kavanagh 0-2, B Murphy 0-1. |

| 22 June 1997 Quarter-final | Dublin | 1-11 - 3-16 | Kilkenny | Parnell Park |
| | D Lawlor 1-1, A O'Grady 0-3, M O'Kenny 0-2, L Bergin 0-2, B Hogan 0-2, L Rainsford 0-1. | | O O'Connor 1-11, D Fennelly 1-2, R Moore 1-1, C Connery 0-1, D Maher 0-1. |

| 25 June 1997 Quarter-final | Kildare | 0-09 - 1-10 | Meath | St. Conleth's Park |
| | G Deering 0-6, N Swan 0-1, C Buggy 0-1, T Spain 0-1. | | N Horan 0-5, M Massey 1-0, M Cole 0-2, T McKeown 0-1, K Dowd 0-1, T Byrne 0-1. |

=== Leinster semi-finals ===
| 5 July 1997 Semi-final | Carlow | 2-09 - 0-14 | Meath | Dr. Cullen Park |
| | D Murphy 1-2, D Doyle 1-0, M Mullins 0-3, J Hayden 0-2, P Coady 0-1, J Kavanagh 0-1. | | N Horan 0-9, K Dowd 0-2, B Gilsenan 0-2, M Massey 0-1. |

| 5 July 1997 Semi-final | Kilkenny | 2-13 - 2-10 | Wicklow | Nowlan Park |
| | R Moore 0-4, P Treacy 0-4, D Fennelly 1-0, G Walsh 1-0, D Maher 0-3, A Cleere 0-1, C Harrington 0-1. | | D Hyland 0-5, J O'Toole 1-0, J O'Neill 1-0, T McGrath 0-2, J Keogh 0-2, M O'Neill 0-1. |

=== Leinster final ===
| 20 July 1997 Final | Carlow | 2-11 - 5-15 | Kilkenny | Dr. Cullen Park |
| | M Mullins 0-5, D Doyle 1-0, P Coady 1-0, D Murphy 0-2, K Nolan 0-1, J Nevin 0-1, J Cavanagh 0-1, N English 0-1. | | O O'Connor 2-5, P Treacy 1-3, R Shortall 1-2, D Fennelly 1-1, W O'Keeffe 0-2, D Maher 0-1, C Harrington 0-1. |

== Munster Intermediate Hurling Championship ==
=== Munster quarter-finals ===
| 25 May 1997 Quarter-final | Limerick | 5-11 - 1-11 | Waterford | Semple Stadium |
| | D Ryan 3-0, M O'Brien 1-3, J Cormican 1-2, M Roche 0-4, G Galvin 0-1, T Barry 0-1. | | P Foley 1-0, S Burns 0-3, JJ Fitzpatrick 0-3, JJ Ronayne 0-2, K Walsh 0-1, M Power 0-1, T Reid 0-1. |

| 8 June 1997 Quarter-final | Cork | 0-14 - 1-10 | Clare | Gaelic Grounds |
| | T Crowley 0-4, J Smiddy 0-3, T McCarthy 0-2, A Walsh 0-2, D Barrett 0-1, D Mulcahy 0-1, A O'Driscoll 0-1. | | S Doyle 0-6, PJ Kelleher 1-0, P Minogue 0-2, M Daffy 0-1, J McInerney 0-1. |

=== Munster semi-finals ===
| 15 June 1997 Semi-final | Tipperary | 0-16 - 1-14 | Limerick | Semple Stadium |
| | P Hogan 0-7, G Maguire 0-4, D O'Connor 0-2, K Maguire 0-1, P O'Keeffe 0-1, E Corcoran 0-1. | | M Roche 1-7, G Galvin 0-3, D Ryan 0-2, J Cormican 0-1, M O'Brien 0-1. |

| 25 June 1997 Semi-final | Kerry | 1-04 - 1-19 | Cork | Austin Stack Park |
| | V Murphy 1-3, M Slattery 0-1. | | J Smiddy 0-10, D Barrett 0-4, D Moher 1-0, R Dwane 0-2, T McCarthy 0-1, T Crowley 0-1, B Sheehan 0-1. |

=== Munster final ===
| 23 July 1997 Final | Limerick | 1-12 - 1-15 | Cork | Gaelic Grounds |
| | D Ryan 1-3, M Roche 0-6, T Hayes 0-1, P Neenan 0-1, J Butler 0-1. | | D Barrett 1-1, A Walsh 0-4, B O'Driscoll 0-4, J Smiddy 0-2, G Cummins 0-1, J O'Sullivan 0-1, R Dwane 0-1, T Crowley 0-1. |

== Ulster Intermediate Hurling Championship ==
=== Ulster final ===
| 17 August 1997 Final | Derry | 6-18 - 1-06 | Armagh | Celtic Park |
| | Gary Biggs 2-3, M Collins 1-6, P McEldowney 0-5, D Kelly 1-2, B Ward 1-1, J O'Dwyer 1-0, E Farren 0-1. | | N McKee 1-2, N McCann 0-2, C McKee 0-1, M Lennon 0-1. |

== All-Ireland Intermediate Hurling Championship ==
=== All-Ireland quarter-final ===
| 9 August 1997 Quarter-final | Galway | 1-16 - 0-11 | London | Dunlo GAA Grounds |
| | R Gantley 0-7, B Larkin 1-0, M Connolly 0-3, P Forde 0-2, L Hogan 0-2, F Healy 0-1, M Forde 0-1. | | T Moloney 0-11. |

=== All-Ireland semi-final ===
| 7 September 1997 Semi-final | Galway | 6-26 - 0-04 | Derry | Markievicz Park |
| | B Larkin 3-2, R Gantley 1-6, M Connolly 1-5, M Kenny 1-5, P Forde 0-3, F Healy 0-3, L Hogan 0-2, K Gavin 0-1. | | D Cassidy 0-2, S Lagan 0-1, P Ó Mainín 0-1. |

| 13 September 1997 Semi-final | Cork | 0-12 - 1-09 | Kilkenny | Fraher Field |
| | B O'Driscoll 0-4, D Murphy 0-2, T McCarthy 0-2, P Cahill 0-1, R Dwane 0-1, D Barrett 0-1, D Moher 0-1. | | O O'Connor 1-4, D Maher 0-2, R Shortall 0-1, P Treacy 0-1, B O'Keeffe 0-1. |

| 27 September 1997 Semi-final replay | Cork | 0-13 - 0-09 | Kilkenny | Fraher Field |
| | S O'Farrell 0-4, J Smiddy 0-4, R Dwane 0-2, C Murphy 0-1, D Moher 0-1, A Walsh 0-1. | | O O'Connor 0-6, G Walsh 0-2, A Cleere 0-1. |

=== All-Ireland final ===
| 11 October 1997 Final | Cork | 2-11 - 1-12 | Galway | Gaelic Grounds |
| | J Smiddy 0-5, R Dwane 1-1, S O'Farrell 1-0, A Walsh 0-3, D Moher 0-1, M Landers 0-1. | | R Gantley 0-4, F Healy 1-2, M Connolly 0-3, N Kenny 0-2, P Forde 0-1. |

== Championship statistics ==
=== Top scorers ===
Overall

| Rank | Player | Team | Tally | Total | Matches | Average |
|---|---|---|---|---|---|---|
| 1 | Ollie O'Connor | Kilkenny | 4-26 | 38 | 4 | 9.50 |
| 2 | Rory Gantley | Galway | 2-21 | 27 | 4 | 6.75 |
| 3 | Basil Larkin | Galway | 7-03 | 24 | 3 | 8.00 |
| 3 | Jimmy Smiddy | Cork | 0-24 | 24 | 5 | 4.80 |
| 5 | Michael Connolly | Galway | 2-14 | 20 | 4 | 5.00 |
| 5 | Maurice Roche | Limerick | 1-17 | 20 | 3 | 6.66 |
| 7 | Donal Ryan | Limerick | 4-05 | 17 | 3 | 5.66 |
| 8 | Fergal Healy | Galway | 2-10 | 16 | 4 | 4.00 |
| 9 | Nicky Horan | Meath | 0-14 | 14 | 2 | 7.00 |
| 10 | Dermot Fennelly | Kilkenny | 3-03 | 12 | 4 | 3.00 |
| 10 | Mark Mullins | Carlow | 0-12 | 12 | 3 | 4.00 |

In a single game

| Rank | Player | Team | Tally | Total | Opposition |
|---|---|---|---|---|---|
| 1 | Ollie O'Connor | Kilkenny | 1-11 | 14 | Dublin |
| 2 | Basil Larkin | Galway | 3-02 | 11 | Derry |
| 2 | Ollie O'Connor | Kilkenny | 2-05 | 11 | Carlow |
| 2 | Timmy Moloney | London | 0-11 | 11 | Galway |
| 5 | Basil Larkin | Galway | 3-01 | 10 | Roscommon |
| 5 | Maurice Roche | Limerick | 1-07 | 10 | Tipperary |
| 5 | Jimmy Smiddy | Cork | 0-10 | 10 | Roscommon |
| 8 | Donal Ryan | Limerick | 3-00 | 9 | Waterford |
| 8 | Gary Biggs | Derry | 2-03 | 9 | Armagh |
| 8 | Michael Collins | Derry | 1-06 | 9 | Armagh |
| 8 | Rory Gantley | Galway | 1-06 | 9 | Derry |
| 8 | Nicky Horan | Meath | 0-09 | 9 | Carlow |
