= Brian Molloy (hurler) =

Irish hurler

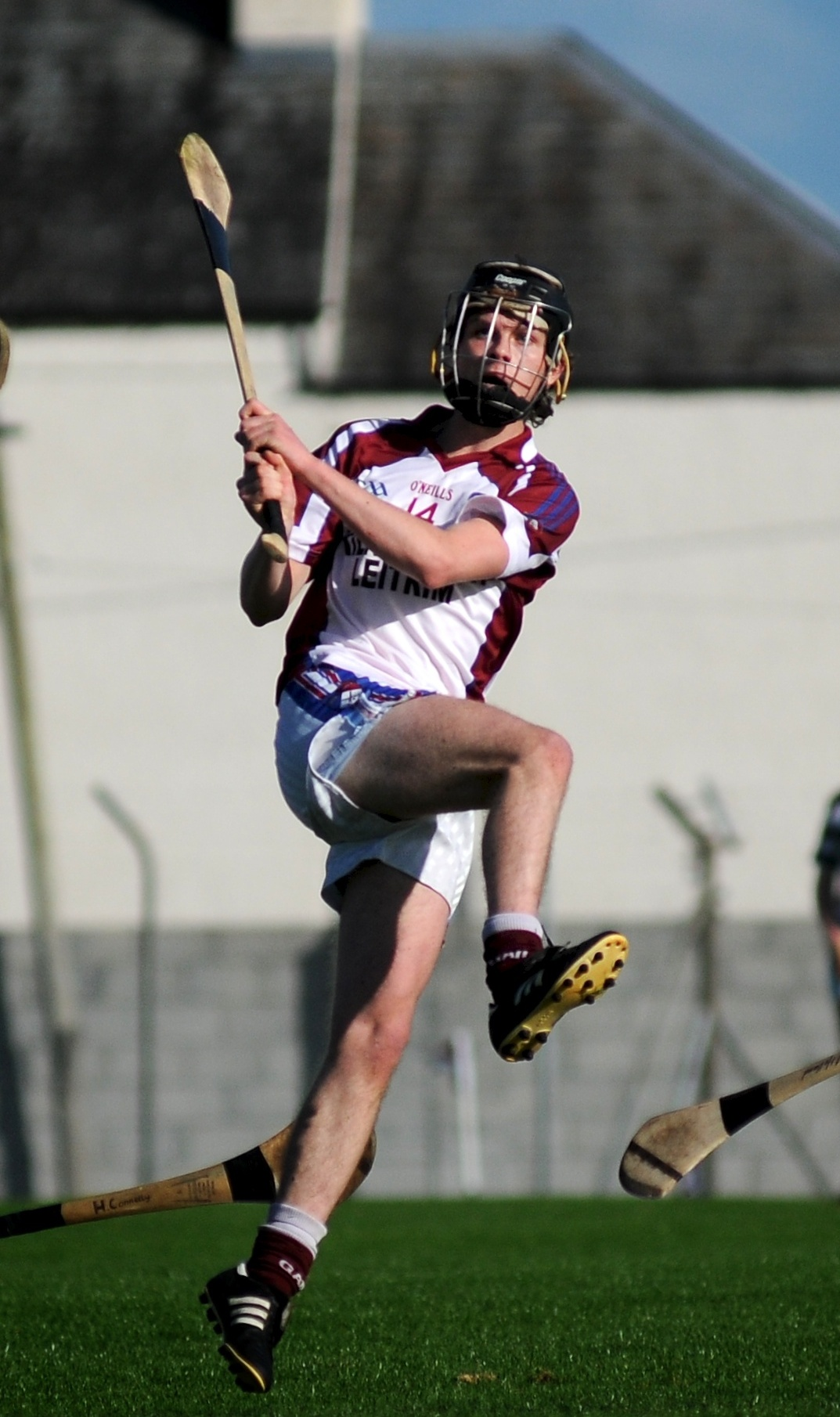
- Molloy in 2013

Personal information
- Native name: Brían Ó Maolmhuaidh (Irish)
- Born: 9 September 1995 (age 31) Ballinasloe, County Galway, Ireland
- Height: 1.78 m (5 ft 10 in)

Sport
- Sport: Hurling
- Position: Right corner forward
Club
- Years: Club
- 2012-present: Kilnadeema–Leitrim
Club titles
- Galway titles: 0
College
- Years: College
- Maynooth University
College titles
- Fitzgibbon titles: 0
Inter-county
- Years: County
- 2015-2017: Galway
Inter-county titles
- Leinster titles: 1
- All-Irelands: 1
- NHL: 1
- All Stars: 0

Brian Molloy (born 9 September 1995) is an Irish hurler. At club level, he plays with Kilnadeema–Leitrim and he has also lined out at inter-county level with various Galway teams.

== Career ==
Molloy first played hurling to a high standard as a student at St. Brigid's Vocational School in Loughrea. He was part of the school's senior team that won the All-Ireland Vocational Schools SHC title in 2011. He later lined out with Maynooth University in the Fitzgibbon Cup, while he also captured a Kehoe Cup title in 2017.

At club level, Molloy first played at juvenile and underage levels with Kilnadeema–Leitrim, before eventually progressing to adult level. He was full-forward on the team that suffered defeat by Rower-Inistioge in the 2014 All-Ireland Club IHC final.

Molloy's inter-county career with Galway began with a three-year association with the minor team. He was a 15-year-old non-playing substitute when he claimed an All-Ireland MHC winners' medal in 2011. Molloy was denied a second medal when Waterford beat Galway in the 2013 All-Ireland minor final. A three-year association with the under-21 team yielded little in terms of on-field success. He captained the team to a defeat by Waterford in the 2016 All-Ireland under-21 final. Molloy also earned inclusion on the Team of the Year in 2015 and 2016.

By this stage, Molloy had already joined the senior team, having made his debut during the successful Walsh Cup campaign in 2015. He also won an All-Ireland IHC medal that year and was a non-playing substitute when Kilkenny beat the senior team in the 2015 All-Ireland final. Molloy remained a peripheral figure with the team over the following few years and was a member of the extended training panel when Galway beat Waterford to claim the All-Ireland SHC title in 2017.

== Career statistics ==
| Team | Year | National League | | | Leinster | | All-Ireland | | Total | |
| Team | Year | Division | Apps | Score | Apps | Score | Apps | Score | Apps | Score |
|---|---|---|---|---|---|---|---|---|---|---|
| Galway | 2015 | Division 1A | 4 | 0-02 | 0 | 0-00 | 0 | 0-00 | 4 | 0-02 |
| Galway | 2016 | Division 1A | 0 | 0-00 | 0 | 0-00 | 0 | 0-00 | 0 | 0-00 |
| Galway | 2017 | Division 1B | 2 | 1-01 | 0 | 0-00 | 0 | 0-00 | 2 | 1-01 |
| Total | | | 6 | 1-03 | 0 | 0-00 | 0 | 0-00 | 6 | 1-03 |

== Honours ==
St. Brigid's Vocational School

- All-Ireland Vocational Schools Senior A Hurling Championship: 2011

Maynooth University

- Kehoe Cup: 2017

Kilnadeema–Leitrim

- Connacht Intermediate Club Hurling Championship: 2013
- Galway Intermediate Hurling Championship: 2013

Galway

- All-Ireland Senior Hurling Championship: 2017
- Leinster Senior Hurling Championship: 2017
- National Hurling League: 2017
- Walsh Cup: 2015
- All-Ireland Intermediate Hurling Championship: 2015
- Leinster Intermediate Hurling Championship: 2015
- All-Ireland Minor Hurling Championship: 2011
