= Colm Spillane =

Irish hurler

Personal information
- Native name: Colm Ó Spealáin (Irish)
- Born: 1 July 1993 (age 33) Castlelyons, County Cork, Ireland
- Occupation: Secondary school teacher
- Height: 6 ft 0 in (183 cm)

Sport
- Sport: Hurling
- Position: Left corner-back
Clubs
- Years: Club
- 2010-present 2015-2016 2017-2018: Castlelyons → University College Cork → Imokilly
Club titles
- Cork titles: 2
College
- Years: College
- 2012-2017: University College Cork
College titles
- Fitzgibbon titles: 0
Inter-county*
Years	County	Apps (scores)
2013-2021	Cork	13 (0-01)
Inter-county titles
- Munster titles: 2
- All-Irelands: 0
- NHL: 0
- All Stars: 0
- *Inter County team apps and scores correct as of 21:52, 31 July 2021.

Colm Spillane (born 1 July 1993) is an Irish hurler who plays for Cork Championship club Castlelyons. He played for the Cork senior hurling team at various stages between 2013 and 2021, during which time he usually lined out as a corner-back.

Spillane began his hurling career at club level with Castlelyons. He broke onto the club's top adult team as a 16-year-old in 2010, before later lining out for University College Cork and Imokilly, winning consecutive County Championship titles with the latter.

At inter-county level, Spillane enjoyed five consecutive but unsuccessful seasons with the Cork minor and under-21 teams, before later winning an All-Ireland Intermediate Championship title. He joined the Cork senior team in 2013. Spillane's senior career was blighted by a series of injuries, however, he made a combined total of 31 National League and Championship appearances in a career that ended with his last game in 2021. During that time he was part of two Munster Championship-winning teams – in 2017 and 2018. Spillane was an All-Ireland Championship runner-up on one occasion. He announced his retirement from inter-county hurling on 6 December 2021.

== Playing career ==
=== College ===
Spillane first came to prominence as a hurler with St. Colman's College in Fermoy. Having played hurling in every grade during his time at the school, winning a White Cup title in the under-15 grade, he usually lined out in the forwards on the senior team in the Harty Cup.

=== University ===
As a student at University College Cork, Spillane joined the college senior team. In 2017 he was captain of the team for the Fitzgibbon Cup, while he has also lined out with the college in the county championship.

=== Club ===
Spillane joined the Castlelyons club at a young age and played in all grades at juvenile and underage levels, winning an under-21 championship medal in 2010 following a defeat of Ballinascarthy. He has also been selected for divisional side Imokilly in the senior championship.

=== Inter-county ===
==== Minor, under-21 and intermediate ====
Spillane first played for Cork at minor level on 26 June 2010 in a draw with Waterford. He was captain of the team for Cork's unsuccessful season in 2011 before playing for three unsuccessful seasons with the Cork under-21 team. By this stage, Spillane had also joined the Cork intermediate team, winning a Munster medal on 25 June 2014 after a 4–15 to 2–08 defeat of Tipperary. On 9 August 2014, he won an All-Ireland medal following a 2–18 to 2–12 defeat of Wexford in the final.

==== Senior ====
Spillane made his senior debut for Cork on 19 January 2013 in a Waterford Crystal Cup defeat of University College Cork at the Mardyke Arena. He made his first start in a National League relegation play-off defeat by Clare on 14 April 2013.

Spillane was a regular member of the league panel for the 2014 campaign, before being released prior to the start of the championship and being omitted completely in 2015.

Spillane returned to the senior panel in 2016, however, he missed the latter stages of the league and the championship after suffering a cruciate ligament injury in a game against Waterford.

After recovering, he made his first championship start on 21 May 2017 in a Munster Championship quarter-final defeat of Tipperary. On 9 July 2017, Spillane won his first Munster medal following a 1–25 to 1–20 defeat of Clare in the final.

On 1 July 2018, Spillane won a second successive Munster medal following a 2–24 to 3–19 defeat of Clare in the final. He ended the season by being nominated for an All-Star Award.

On 5 March 2019, it was confirmed that Spillane, who had missed the early stages of the National League, was not able to get back to full training until closer to the Munster Championship. The extent of his injuries resulted in Spillane missing the entire championship campaign.

On 7 January 2020, Spillane returned to the Cork senior team when he lined out at right corner-back in Cork's 2–18 to 1–20 defeat by University College Cork in the Canon O'Brien Cup.

== Career statistics ==
Team	Year	National League			Munster		All-Ireland		Total	
Team	Year	Division	Apps	Score	Apps	Score	Apps	Score	Apps	Score
Cork	2013	Division 1A	1	0-00	0	0-00	0	0-00	1	0-00
Cork	2014	Division 1B	1	0-00	—		—		1	0-00
Cork	2015	Division 1A	—		—		—		—	
Cork	2016	Division 1A	1	0-00	0	0-00	0	0-00	1	0-00
Cork	2017	Division 1A	6	0-00	3	0-00	1	0-00	10	0-00
Cork	2018	Division 1A	5	0-02	5	0-01	1	0-00	11	0-03
Cork	2019	Division 1A	—		—		—		—	
Cork	2020	Division 1A	4	0-00	0	0-00	2	0-00	6	0-00
Cork	2021	Division 1A	0	0-00	0	0-00	1	0-00	1	0-00
Total			18	0-02	8	0-01	5	0-00	31	0-03

== Honours ==
Castlelyons

- Cork Under-21 B Hurling Championship: 2010

Imokilly

- Cork Senior Hurling Championship: 2017, 2018

Cork

- Munster Senior Hurling Championship: 2017, 2018
- All-Ireland Intermediate Hurling Championship: 2014
- Munster Intermediate Hurling Championship: 2014

Sporting positions
Preceded by	Cork Minor Hurling Captain; 2011	Succeeded by Stephen Murphy
