= 2018 All-Ireland Intermediate Hurling Championship =

Championship Details
- Dates: 28 July 2018
- Teams: 2

All Ireland Champions
- Winners: Cork (9th win)
- Captain: Michael Russell
- Manager: Ronan Dwane

All Ireland Runners-up
- Runners-up: Kilkenny
- Captain: Eamonn Egan
- Manager: Dave O'Neill

Provincial Champions
- Munster: Not Played
- Leinster: Not Played
- Ulster: Not Played
- Connacht: Not Played

Championship Statistics
- Matches Played: 1
- Total Goals: 2 (2.00 per game)
- Total Points: 37 (37.00 per game)
- Top Scorer: Dan Mangan (2-02); James Bergin (0-08)

The 2018 All-Ireland Intermediate Hurling Championship was the 35th staging of the All-Ireland Intermediate Hurling Championship since its establishment by the Gaelic Athletic Association in 1961. The championship was held on 28 July 2018.

Kilkenny were the defending champions.

On 28 July 2018, Cork won the title following a 2-19 to 0-18 defeat of Kilkenny in the All-Ireland final at Nowlan Park. It was their ninth championship title overall and their first since 2014.

== Teams ==
=== Overview ===
The 2018 championship saw the fewest teams participating in recent years. Both of the provincial championships in Leinster and Munster were suspended, resulting in Kilkenny and Cork being nominated to represent the respective provinces in the All-Ireland final.

=== Summaries ===
Team	Colours	Most recent success	
Team	Colours	All-Ireland	Provincial
Cork	Red and white	2014	2015
Kilkenny	Black and amber	2017	2017

== Result ==
=== All-Ireland Intermediate Hurling Championship ===
Final

28 July 2018
14:00
Final

Kilkenny	0-18 – 2-19	Cork
J Bergin (0-8 frees), P Walsh (0-3), P Hennebry, S Murphy and C Hennessy (0-2 each), R Hickey (0-1).	Report	D Mangan (2-2), S Condon (0-7, 0-6 frees), C O'Leary (0-2 frees) and C Murphy (0-3 each), J Walsh (0-2), S Hegarty and M Collins (0-1 each).

Nowlan Park, Kilkenny
Referee: J Keane (Galway)
