= CIHC =

CIHC may refer to:

- Connacht Intermediate Hurling Championship, a hurling competition in Ireland
- CIHC-TV, a Canadian channel
