= 1968 All-Ireland Intermediate Hurling Championship =

All Ireland Champions
- Winners: London (2nd win)

All Ireland Runners-up
- Runners-up: Dublin

Provincial Champions
- Munster: Limerick
- Leinster: Dublin
- Ulster: Down
- Connacht: Roscommon

The 1968 All-Ireland Intermediate Hurling Championship was the eighth staging of the All-Ireland Intermediate Hurling Championship since its establishment by the Gaelic Athletic Association in 1961.

London entered the championship as the defending champions.

The All-Ireland final was played at Croke Park in Dublin on 29 September 1968 between London and Dublin, in what was their first ever meeting in the final. London won the match by 4–15 to 0–03 to claim their second All-Ireland title overall and a second title in succession.

== Munster Intermediate Hurling Championship ==
=== Munster quarter-finals ===
21 April 1968 Quarter-final	Tipperary	2-03 - 4-02	Limerick	MacDonagh Park
	C Hartigan 1-0, M Cawley 1-0, M Heffernan 0-2, S Maher 0-1.		P Fogarty 2-0, J McGrath 1-0, P Carroll 1-0, J Ryan 0-1, T Hickey 0-1.

21 April 1968 Quarter-final	Cork	3-12 - 1-03	Kerry	Castle Grounds
	F Sheedy 2-2, F Kelleher 1-3, J Sheehy 0-3, L Walsh 0-2, A Twomey 0-1, N Gallagher 0-1.		E O'Sullivan 1-0, T McEnery 0-2, D Lovett 0-1.

5 May 1968 Quarter-final	Waterford	2-06 - 6-03	Clare	Walsh Park
	E Callaghan 1-6, M Gilmann 1-0.		M Linnane 4-0, M Clune 1-3, J McNamara 1-0.

=== Munster semi-finals ===
12 May 1968 Semi-final	Cork	3-09 - 4-02	Galway	Gaelic Grounds
	L McAuliffe 1-1, N Gallagher 1-0, J Murphy 1-0, F Kelleher 0-3, F Sheedy 0-3, T Meaney 0-2.		H Conway 2-1, I Madden 2-0, S Stanley 0-1.

23 May 1968 Semi-final	Clare	2-08 - 2-08	Limerick	Cusack Park
	M Clune 1-3, M Linnane 1-0, P Ryan 0-3, J Teefy 0-1, V Arthur 0-1.		J McGrath 1-2, T McAuliffe 1-0, C McCarthy 0-3, J O'Donnell 0-1, T Hickey 0-1, P Carroll 0-1.

23 June 1968 Semi-final	Limerick	0-13 - 1-02	Clare	Gaelic Grounds
	C McCarthy 0-4, P Carey 0-3, F Costello 0-2, P Ryan 0-2, A Hickey 0-1, M McLoughlin 0-1.		J McNamara 1-0, S O'Leary 0-1, M Clune 0-1.

=== Munster final ===
11 August 1968 Final	Limerick	3-08 - 1-06	Cork	Gaelic Grounds
	C McCarthy 1-5, R Martin 1-1, P Ryan 1-0, R Ryan 0-1, K Dermody 0-1.		D Ryan 1-2, B O'Connell 0-2, J O'Mahony 0-1, L Walsh 0-1.	Referee: M Slattery (Clare)

== All-Ireland Intermediate Hurling Championship ==
=== All-Ireland quarter-final ===
11 August 1968 Quarter-final	Down	2-03 - 1-14	Roscommon	St. Coman's Park
	B Mitchell 1-1, R Fallon 1-0, F Kenny 0-2.		B Falloona 1-4, P Braniff 0-7, H Dorrian 0-1, P Byers 0-1, J McGivern 0-1.

=== All-Ireland semi-finals ===
25 August 1968 Semi-final	Limerick	3-06 - 3-10	London	Gaelic Grounds
	C McCarthy 1-2, M Fitzgerald 1-0, T Hickey 1-0, M O'Brien 0-2, E Prendeville 0-2.		M Loughnane 1-1, M Kirwan 1-1, T Cleary 1-0, M Ryan 0-3, F Condon 0-3, S Lambe 0-2.	Referee: M Slattery (Clare)

25 August 1968 Semi-final	Down	1-07 - 0-14	Dublin	McKenna Park
	H Dorrian 1-3, P Braniff 0-2, R Faloona 0-1, C Duff 0-1.		J Hackett 0-4, C Ryan 0-2, W Lee 0-2, L Heneberry 0-2, T Cunningham 0-2, S Doran 0-1, J Kenny 0-1.

=== All-Ireland final ===
29 September 1968 Final	London	4-15 - 0-03	Dublin	Croke Park
	F Condon 0-10, S Lambe 1-3, T Connolly 1-1, M Kirwan 1-0, T Cleary 1-0, M Loughnane 0-1.		G Hackett 0-1, J Kenny 0-1, C Ryan 0-1.	Referee: J Dowling (Offaly)
