= 1963 All-Ireland Intermediate Hurling Championship =

Championship Details
- Dates: 7 April – 8 September 1963
- Teams: 15

All Ireland Champions
- Winners: Tipperary (1st win)
- Captain: Jackie Lanigan

All Ireland Runners-up
- Runners-up: London

Provincial Champions
- Munster: Tipperary
- Leinster: Wexford
- Ulster: Not Played
- Connacht: Not Played

Championship Statistics
- Matches Played: 16
- Total Goals: 98 (6.12 per game)
- Total Points: 245 (15.31 per game)
- Top Scorer: Michael Keating (0-33)

The 1963 All-Ireland Intermediate Hurling Championship was the third staging of the All-Ireland Intermediate Hurling Championship since its establishment by the Gaelic Athletic Association in 1961. The championship ran from 7 April to 8 September 1963.

Carlow were the defending champions, however, they availed of their right to promotion to the All-Ireland Senior Hurling Championship and did not field a team.

The All-Ireland final was played at Thurles Sportsfield on 8 September 1963 between Tipperary and London, in what was their first ever championship meeting. Tipperary won the match by 1-10 to 1-07 to claim their first ever All-Ireland title.

Tipperary's Michael Keating was the championship's top scorer with 0-33.

== Leinster Intermediate Hurling Championship ==
=== Leinster first round ===
7 April 1963 First round	Dublin	1-05 - 3-07	Antrim	Croke Park
	J Shields 1-1, C Walsh 0-1, L Byrne 0-1, N Dempsey 0-1, C Daly 0-1.		D Elliott 1-2, E McMullan 1-2, O Campbell 1-0, G Mulholland 0-1, B McGurk 0-1, P Reilly 0-1.

14 April 1963 First round	Kildare	6-03 - 3-01	Laois	Geraldine Park
	M Leahy 2-2, OG 2-0, N Kenny 1-1, S Schwer 1-0,		T Fitzgerald 1-0, C Delaney 1-0, P Bates 0-1.	Referee: E Long (Carlow)

5 May 1963 First round	Meath	5-07 - 2-07	Offaly	St. Loman's Park
	P Christie 2-2, M McCabe 1-1, C Cunningham 1-1, P Darby 1-1, J Kane 0-2.

=== Leinster second round ===
26 May 1963 Second round	Meath	2-06 - 3-12	Wexford	Ashford Grounds
	A Kavanagh 1-1, J Kane 1-1, P Christie 0-2, P Darby 0-1, S Curtis 0-1.		L Kehoe 1-5, E Doyle 1-2, W Sinnott 1-0, R O'Leary 0-2, J Creane 0-2, M Doyle 0-1.

=== Leinster semi-finals ===
9 June 1963 Semi-final	Wexford	7-08 - 7-07	Antrim	Croke Park
	M Nolan 4-2, L Kehoe 2-2, M Doyle 1-4.		P Mullaney 3-0, E McMullan 2-1, D Elliott 1-2, P O'Reilly 1-0, B McGurk 0-3, A Forsythe 0-1.

30 June 1963 Semi-final	Kilkenny	5-16 - 1-06	Kildare	Nowlan Park
	T Murphy 1-7, S O'Brien 2-1, M Ryan 1-2, N Teehan 1-1, T Walsh 0-2, P Walsh 0-2, J Murphy 0-1.		P Dunny 1-1, T O'Connell 0-2, A Shape 0-2, E O'Brien 0-1.

=== Leinster final ===
14 July 1963 Final	Wexford	3-08 - 3-06	Kilkenny	O'Kennedy Park
	J Harding 2-0, E Doyle 0-4, L Crane 1-0, L Kehoe 0-3, M Doyle 0-1.		N Teehan 2-0, M Aylward 1-1, Carrigan 0-2, J Delaney 0-2, J Murphy 0-1.

== Munster Intermediate Hurling Championship ==
=== Munster quarter-finals ===
28 April 1963 Quarter-final	Cork	4-10 - 3-04	Waterford	Clonmult Memorial Park
	R Browne 3-4, C Cooney 1-1, J O'Connor 0-3, J White 0-2.		P Dee 2-0, M Connolly 1-0, D Long 0-3, J Mason 0-1.

28 April 1963 Quarter-final	Tipperary	3-10 - 6-01	Limerick	Seán Treacy Park
	M Keating 0-6, M Roche 1-2, J Lanigan 1-0, W Horgan 1-0, TJ Grace 0-2.		M Geary 2-0, J Begley 2-0, P Carroll 1-1, P Salmon 1-0.

5 May 1963 Quarter-final	Clare	3-07 - 0-09	Kerry	Cusack Park
	M Keane 2-6, A Clancy 1-0, A O'Riordan 0-1.		J Barry 0-4, M Hennessy 0-2, R McCarthy 0-1, D McCarthy 0-1, M Horton 0-1.

26 May 1963 Quarter-final replay	Limerick	2-07 - 3-09	Tipperary	FitzGerald Park
	R McLoughlin 1-0, J Dunworth 1-0, M O'Brien 0-3, J Begley 0-1, P Carroll 0-1, P Kiely 0-1, M Geary 0-1.		T Flynn 1-1, T Larkin 1-1, J Lanigan 1-0, M Roche 0-3, W Whelan 0-2, M Keating 0-1, PJ Grace 0-1.

=== Munster semi-finals ===
19 May 1963 Semi-final	Clare	6-05 - 3-12	Galway	MacDonagh Park
	M Keane 2-2, J Taaffe 2-0, M Farry 1-0, J McMahon 1-0, P O'Loughlin 0-2, F Keane 0-1.		F Connaire 2-2, P Gardiner 1-4, P Mitchell 0-3, F Loughnane 0-2, P Gordon 0-1.

16 June 1963 Semi-final	Tipperary	3-09 - 1-12	Cork	Leahy Park
	M Keating 0-5, M Roche 1-1, J Lanigan 1-0, T Larkin 1-0, PJ Grace 0-2, T Flynn 0-1.		J O'Connor 0-6, P O'Brien 1-0, P Behan 0-3, B Ahern 0-1, C Sheehan 0-1, C Cooney 0-1.

=== Munster final ===
21 July 1963 Final	Tipperary	6-10 - 0-04	Clare	MacDonagh Park
	T Larkin 2-0, J Lanigan 1-3, F Condon 1-1, M Keating 0-4, J Collison 1-0, M Kearns 1-0, M Roche 0-2.		P O'Loughlin 0-1, M Keane 0-1, M Barry 0-1, J Dunne 0-1.

== All-Ireland Intermediate Hurling Championship ==
=== All-Ireland home final ===
18 August 1963 Home final	Tipperary	0-17 - 2-03	Wexford	Walsh Park
	M Keating 0-11, T Larkin 0-4, M Roche 0-1, PJ Grace 0-1.		L Creane 1-3, L Kehoe 1-0.	Referee: S Power (Waterford)

=== All-Ireland final ===
8 September 1932 Final	Tipperary	1-10 - 1-07	London	Thurles Sportsfield
	M Keating 0-6, J Lanigan 1-0, M Roche 0-3, M Kearns 0-1.		P O'Dwyer 1-0, P Ryan 0-2, J Tiernan 0-2, T Cleary 0-2, P Spillane 0-1.	Referee: P Johnston (Kilkenny)

== Championship statistics ==
=== Top scorers ===
Overall

Rank	Player	Team	Tally	Total
1	Michael Keating	Tipperary	0-33	33
2	Milo Keane	Clare	4-09	21
3	Larry Kehoe	Wexford	3-10	19
4	Jackie Lanigan	Tipperary	5-03	18
4	Mick Roche	Tipperary	2-12	18
6	Tom Larkin	Tipperary	4-05	17
7	Martin Nolan	Wexford	4-02	14
8	Richie Browne	Cork	3-04	13
9	E. McMullan	Antrim	3-03	12
10	Larry Creane	Wexford	2-05	11
