= Michael O'Sullivan (hurler) =

Irish hurler

Personal information
- Native name: Mícheál Ó Súilleabháin (Irish)
- Nickname: Big Micky
- Born: 15 August 1990 (age 36) Minane Bridge, County Cork, Ireland
- Occupation: Student
- Height: 6 ft 0 in (183 cm)

Sport
- Sport: Hurling
- Position: Full-forward
Club
- Years: Club
- Tracton
Club titles
- Cork titles: 0
Inter-county*
Years	County	Apps (scores)
2012-2014	Cork	0 (0-00)
Inter-county titles
- Munster titles: 0
- All-Irelands: 0
- NHL: 0
- All Stars: 0
- *Inter County team apps and scores correct as of 12:57, 14 August 2013.

Michael O'Sullivan (born 15 August 1990) is an Irish hurler who played as a full-forward for the Cork senior team.

Born in Minane Bridge, County Cork, O'Sullivan first played competitive hurling in his younger days and at school. He arrived on the inter-county scene at the age of nineteen when he first linked up with the Cork under-21 team, before later lining out with the intermediate side. He joined the senior panel for the 2012 National Hurling League.

O'Sullivan currently plays in the United States.

On 3 April 2014 it was announced that O'Sullivan had been dropped from Cork's championship panel.

== Honours ==
=== Team ===
Cork

- All-Ireland Intermediate Hurling Championship (1): 2014, 2018
- Munster Intermediate Hurling Championship (1): 2014, 2018
