= James Skehill =

Galway hurling goalkeeper

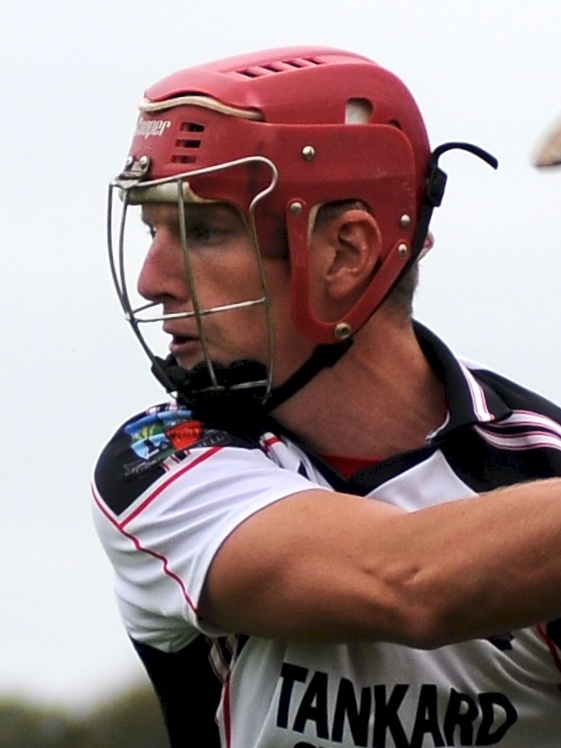

Personal information
- Native name: Séamus Ó Sceacháil (Irish)
- Born: 22 February 1988 (age 38) Ballinasloe, County Galway, Ireland
- Occupation: Contract manager
- Height: 6 ft 5 in (196 cm)

Sport
- Sport: Hurling
- Position: Goalkeeper
Club
- Years: Club
- 2003–: Cappataggle
Club titles
- Galway titles: 0
College
- Years: College
- 2005–2009: Limerick Institute of Technology
College titles
- Fitzgibbon titles: 1
Inter-county*
Years	County	Apps (scores)
2007–2020	Galway	24 (0–0)
Inter-county titles
- Leinster titles: 3
- All-Irelands: 1
- NHL: 2
- All Stars: 0
- *Inter County team apps and scores correct as of 14:44, 17 October 2019.

James Skehill (born 22 February 1988) is an Irish hurler who plays as a goalkeeper for club side Cappataggle and previously at senior level with the Galway county team.

== Playing career ==
=== University ===
During his studies at the Limerick Institute of Technology, Skehill was selected for the college's senior hurling team. On 10 March 2007, he won a Fitzgibbon Cup medal as LIT won the title after a 2–16 to 0–13 defeat of the NUI Galway in the final.

=== Club ===
Skehill joined the Cappataggle club at a young age and played in all grades at juvenile and underage levels before joining the club's top adult team.

On 9 November 2008, Skehill was on the panel when Cappataggle defeated Killimordaly by 1–10 to 0–11 in the final of the Galway Intermediate Championship. He later won a Connacht Championship medal following a 0–14 to 2–07 defeat of Four Roads. On 5 February 2009, Skehill was an unused substitute when Cappataggle were defeated by 2–14 to 1–12 by Blarney in the All-Ireland final at Croke Park.

On 8 November 2014, Skehill won a second Galway Intermediate Championship medal after a 0–19 to 1–08 defeat of Ahascragh-Fohenagh in a replay of the final. A day later he won the East Galway U10 League after a 0–15 to 1–10 defeat of Ballyhaunis in the final.

=== Inter-county ===
==== Minor and under-21 ====
Skehill first played for Galway as goalkeeper on the minor hurling team on 23 July 2005. He made his first appearance in a 3–13 to 1-11 All-Ireland quarter-final defeat of Wexford. In the subsequent All-Ireland final on 11 September 2005, Skehill kept a clean sheet and claimed a winners' medal after Galway's 3–12 to 0–17 defeat of Limerick.

Skehill was eligible for the minor grade again the following year. On 3 September 2006, he was in goal when Galway were defeated by eleven points by Tipperary in the All-Ireland final.

By 2007 Skehill had progressed onto the Galway under-21 hurling team. On 8 September 2007, he won an All-Ireland medal after keeping a clean sheet in Galway's 5–11 to 0–12 defeat of dublin in the final.

Skehill's final two seasons ended with All-Ireland semi-final defeats by eventual champions Kilkenny and Clare.

==== Intermediate ====
On 1 July 2015, Skehill made his first appearance for the Galway intermediate hurling team. He later won a Leinster Championship medal following Galway's 1–20 to 0–11 defeat of Wexford in the final. On 8 August 2015, Skehill won an All-Ireland medal after Galway's 0–23 to 0–14 defeat of Cork in the final.

==== Senior ====
Skehill made his first appearance for the Galway senior hurling team in 2007 against Tipperary in the NHL. His second was in a 2–24 to 3-17 National Hurling League defeat of Clare on 10 February 2008. He later made his championship debut on 28 June 2008 in a 6–21 to 1–10 defeat of Antrim at Casement Park.

Over the next few seasons Skehill made several National League appearances, however, Colm Callanan was Galway's first-choice goalkeeper for the championship. On 2 May 2010, Skehill won a National League medal as a non-playing substitute following Galway's 2–22 to 1–17 defeat of Cork in the final.

On 8 July 2012, Skehill was in goal for Galway's first ever Leinster Championship title following a 2–21 to 2–11 defeat of Kilkenny in the final. He later lined out in goal for Galway's All-Ireland final meeting with Kilkenny on 9 September 2012. Galway led by 1–09 to 0–07 at half-time, however, it took a 73rd-minute free from Joe Canning to level the scores a 2–13 to 0–19. In Galway's final training session, Skehill dislocated his shoulder and was a doubt for the replay. Medics gave him a "20-80" chance of playing, however, Skehill was named on the starting team and lined out in goal on 30 September 2012. The injury affected his puck-outs, which were much shorter, while he also kicked a ball away from his own goalmouth instead of stooping to lift it. Skehill later admitted that even with a heavy dose of painkillers every puck-out "was like getting stabbed". He left the field in a distressed state at half-time, with Galway trailing by 1–11 to 2-04, and was replaced in goal by Fearghal Flannery. Galway eventually lost the game by 3–22 to 3–11. Skehill ended the season by being nominated for an All-Star award.

After a winter of recuperation, Skehill returned to the Galway panel in May 2013. He returned as first-choice goalkeeper for the Leinster Championship but was replaced by Colm Callanan for the All-Ireland Championship.

On 11 March 2014, news broke of Skehill's shock departure from the Galway senior panel. Selector Damien Curley stated: "There is no real spin to put on it at all, James just told us after training on Friday night that he wanted to leave the panel. We spoke with him and tried to talk him round, but he was adamant he wanted to leave. He works in Cong and I think the long drive over and back to training might have something to do with it. Apart from that I don’t know why he might have decided to leave." Skehill later admitted that he had lost his "bite" for the game.

After a period of time in the United States, Skehill returned to the Galway senior panel for the 2015 season. On 6 September 2015, he was an unused substitute in Galway's 1–22 to 1–18 defeat by Kilkenny in the All-Ireland final.

On 23 April 2017, Skehill was sub-goalkeeper when Galway defeated Tipperary by 3–21 to 0–14 to win the National League. Later that season he won his second Leinster Championship medal as an unused substitute after Galway's 0–29 to 1–17 defeat of Wexford in the final. On 3 September 2017, Skehill was sub-goalkeeper for Galway when they won their first All-Ireland in 29 years after a 0–26 to 2–17 defeat of Waterford in the final.

On 8 July 2018, Skehill won a third Leinster Championship medal, his second on the field of play, following Galway's 1–28 to 3–15 defeat of Kilkenny in the final. On 19 August 2018, Skehill lined out in goal for Galway's 3–16 to 2-18 All-Ireland final defeat by Limerick. In the 58th minute he was replaced by Fearghal Flannery after injuring himself when he went to block a Cian Lynch shot at goal.

Skehill announced his retirement form inter-county hurling in January 2021.

=== Inter-provincial ===
Skehill has also been selected as goalkeeper for Connacht in the Inter-provincial Championship.

=== International ===
In 2007, Skehill was selected for the Ireland national hurling team. He was in goal for the 4–10 to 0–11 defeat by Scotland in the Shinty/Hurling International Series.

== Career statistics ==
As of match played 15 June 2019.

Team	Year	National League			Leinster		All-Ireland		Total	
Team	Year	Division	Apps	Score	Apps	Score	Apps	Score	Apps	Score
Galway	2008	Division 1B	7	0-00	—		3	0-00	10	0-00
Galway	2009	Division 1	1	0-00	0	0-00	0	0-00	1	0-00
Galway	2010	Division 1	4	0-00	0	0-00	0	0-00	4	0-00
Galway	2011	Division 1	0	0-00	2	0-00	3	0-00	5	0-00
Galway	2012	Division 1A	4	0-00	2	0-00	3	0-00	9	0-00
Galway	2013	Division 1A	0	0-00	2	0-00	0	0-00	2	0-00
Galway	2014	Division 1A	0	0-00	—		—		0	0-00
Galway	2015	Division 1A	0	0-00	0	0-00	0	0-00	0	0-00
Galway	2016	Division 1A	6	0-00	0	0-00	0	0-00	6	0-00
Galway	2017	Division 1B	2	0-00	0	0-00	0	0-00	2	0-00
Galway	2018	Division 1B	6	0-00	6	0-00	3	0-00	15	0-00
Galway	2019	Division 1B	1	0-00	0	0-00	—		1	0-00
Galway	2020	Division 1A	2	0-00	0	0-00	0	0-00	2	0-00
Total			33	0-00	12	0-00	12	0-00	57	0-00

== Honours ==
Limerick Institute of Technology

- Fitzgibbon Cup (1): 2007

Cappataggle

- Connacht Intermediate Club Hurling Championship (2): 2008, 2014
- Galway Intermediate Hurling Championship (2): 2008, 2014

Galway

- All-Ireland Senior Hurling Championship (1): 2017
- Leinster Senior Hurling Championship (3): 2012, 2017, 2018
- National Hurling League (2): 2010, 2017
- All-Ireland Intermediate Hurling Championship (1): 2015 (c)
- All-Ireland Under-21 Hurling Championship (1): 2007
- All-Ireland Minor Hurling Championship (1): 2005

Achievements
Preceded by John O'Callaghan	All-Ireland IHC winning captain 2015	Succeeded by Nicky Cleere
