= 2016 All-Ireland Intermediate Hurling Championship =

Championship Details
- Dates: 22 May 2016 – 6 August 2016
- Teams: 8

All Ireland Champions
- Winners: Kilkenny (4th win)
- Captain: Nicky Cleere
- Manager: Pat O'Grady

All Ireland Runners-up
- Runners-up: Clare
- Captain: Shane McGrath

Provincial Champions
- Munster: Clare
- Leinster: Kilkenny
- Ulster: Not Played
- Connacht: Not Played

Championship Statistics
- Matches Played: 7
- Total Goals: 26 (3.71 per game)
- Total Points: 229 (32.71 per game)
- Top Scorer: Shane McGrath (0-23)

The 2016 All-Ireland Intermediate Hurling Championship is the 33rd staging of the All-Ireland hurling championship for players in the intermediate grade since its establishment by the Gaelic Athletic Association in 1961. The championship began on 22 May 2016 and ended on 6 August 2016.

Galway were the defending champions, however, they were defeated by Kilkenny in the Leinster final. Kilkenny won the title after defeating Clare by 5-16 to 1-16 in the final.

== Team summaries ==
| Team | Colours | Most recent success | |
| Team | Colours | All-Ireland | Provincial |
|---|---|---|---|
| Clare | Saffron and blue | | 2011 |
| Cork | Red and white | 2014 | 2015 |
| Galway | Maroon and white | 2015 | 2015 |
| Kilkenny | Black and amber | 2010 | 2013 |
| Limerick | Green and white | 1998 | 2008 |
| Tipperary | Blue and gold | 2013 | 2013 |
| Waterford | White and blue | | 2007 |
| Wexford | Purple and gold | 2004 | 2014 |

== Provincial championships ==
=== Leinster Intermediate Hurling Championship ===
Semi-final

| 29 June 2016 Semi-final | Galway | 0-16 - 1-16 | Wexford | O'Moore Park, Portlaoise |
| | N Morrissey (0-4f), A Helebert (0-3f) 0-4 each, S Loftus 0-3, C Burke 0-2, R Lane, R Cummins, B Concannon 0-1 each. | Report | T Dwyer 0-6 (0-5f), J Pettitt 1-2, J Doyle 0-4 (0-1f), S Donohoe, B Dunne, G Moore & R Mahon 0-1 each. | Referee: G Quilty (Kilkenny) |

Final

| 13 July 2016 Final | Kilkenny | 3-14 - 2-14 | Wexford | Nowlan Park, Kilkenny |
| | M Bergin 1-4 (0-2f), R Leahy 1-1, B Ryan 1-0, J Langton, N Cleere (0-1f), J Walsh, C Tobin 0-2 each, S Donnelly 0-1. | Report | T Dwyer 0-7 (0-7f), J Pettitt, N Kirwan 1-2 each, D Martin Carroll 0-2 (1f), R Mahon, J Doyle 0-1 each. | Referee: M Murtagh (Westmeath) |

=== Munster Intermediate Hurling Championship ===
Quarter-final

| 22 May 2016 Quarter-final | Tipperary | 3-20 - 1-15 | Cork | Semple Stadium, Thurles |
| 14:00 | A McCormack 0-14 (12f), M Russell 2-0, B Hogan 1-0 pen, B McCarthy 0-3, S Ryan, L McGrath & D Fitzell 0-1 each. | Report | N McNamara 0-5f, D Dalton 1-1 (1-0 pen, 0-1f), P O’Rourke 0-3, K Kavanagh, B Murray, K O’Neill, D Brosnan, E O’Sullivan & E Brosnan 0-1 each. | Referee: D O'Driscoll (Limerick) |

Semi-finals

| 5 June 2016 Semi-final | Clare | 3-20 - 2-12 | Waterford | Semple Stadium, Thurles |
| 14:00 | S McGrath 0-7 (5f, 1 65), D Russell, R Taylor & C Crehan 1-2 each, O Donnellan & M O’Malley 0-2 each, J McCarthy, D Conroy & R Hayes 0-1 each. | Report | DJ Foran 2-4, D Gartland 0-4f, M Harney, S Keating, A Molumby & T Waring 0-1 each. | Referee: J McCormack (Tipperary) |

| 19 June 2016 Semi-final | Tipperary | 0-15 - 2-11 | Limerick | Semple Stadium, Thurles |
| 14:00 | A McCormack 0-5 (0-3f), B Stapleton 0-3, S Quirke 0-2, B Hogan (0-1f), J Cahill, T Fox, A Coffey, M Russell 0-1 each. | Report | A Gillane 0-6 (0-5f), P Ryan 1-2, D Dempsey 1-0, W O’Donoghue, K O’Brien, B Murphy 0-1 each. | Referee: D Fox (Clare) |

Final

| 6 July 2016 Final | Limerick | 2-18 - 1-26 | Clare | Gaelic Grounds, Limerick |
| | R Lynch (0-6, 2 frees), A Gillane (1-2, 2 frees), P Ryan (1-0), Willie Griffin (0-3 frees), B Murphy (0-2) A La Touche Cosgrave, K O’Brien, D Dempsey, L Lyons, M Carmody. | Report | S Gleeson (0-8, 5frees) S McGrath (0-6, 4 frees), O Donnellan (1-1), B O’Gorman, R Taylor, D Conroy (0-2 each), K Hehir, J McCarthy, R Hayes, D Russell, M O’Neill (0-1 each). | Referee: J Larkin (Cork) |

== All-Ireland Intermediate Hurling Championship ==
Final

| 6 August 2016 Final | Kilkenny | 5-16 - 1-16 | Clare | Semple Stadium, Thurles |
| | J Walsh 2-2; B Ryan, N Cleere (4f), 1-4 each; L Scanlon 1-2; A Murphy 0-2 (2f); J Langton, S Morrissey 0-1 each. | Report | S McGrath 0-10 (8f); K Hehir 0-3; R Taylor 1-0; J McCarthy 0-2; D Russell 0-1. | Referee: P O'Dwyer (Carlow) |

== Statistics ==
=== Top scorers ===
Overall

| Rank | Player | County | Tally | Total | Matches | Average |
|---|---|---|---|---|---|---|
| 1 | Shane McGrath | Clare | 0-23 | 23 | 3 | 7.66 |
| 2 | Aidan McCormack | Tipperary | 0-19 | 19 | 2 | 9.50 |
| 3 | Tommy Dwyer | Wexford | 0-13 | 13 | 2 | 6.50 |
| 4 | Aaron Gillane | Limerick | 1-08 | 11 | 2 | 5.50 |
| 5 | D. J. Foran | Waterford | 2-04 | 10 | 1 | 10.00 |
| 5 | Billy Ryan | Kilkenny | 2-04 | 10 | 2 | 5.00 |
| 5 | John Walsh | Kilkenny | 2-04 | 10 | 2 | 5.00 |
| 5 | Jack Pettitt | Wexford | 2-04 | 10 | 2 | 5.00 |
| 5 | Ryan Taylor | Clare | 2-04 | 10 | 3 | 3.33 |
| 10 | Nicky Cleere | Kilkenny | 1-06 | 9 | 2 | 4.50 |

Single game

| Rank | Player | County | Tally | Total | Opposition |
|---|---|---|---|---|---|
| 1 | Aidan McCormack | Tipperary | 0-14 | 14 | Cork |
| 2 | D. J. Foran | Waterford | 2-04 | 10 | Clare |
| 2 | Shane McGrath | Clare | 0-10 | 10 | Kilkenny |
| 4 | John Walsh | Kilkenny | 2-02 | 8 | Clare |
| 4 | Shane Gleeson | Clare | 0-08 | 8 | Limerick |
| 6 | Mark Bergin | Kilkenny | 1-04 | 7 | Wexford |
| 6 | Nicky Cleere | Kilkenny | 1-04 | 7 | Clare |
| 6 | Billy Ryan | Kilkenny | 1-04 | 7 | Clare |
| 6 | Shane McGrath | Clare | 0-07 | 7 | Waterford |
| 6 | Tommy Dwyer | Clare | 0-07 | 7 | Kilkenny |

=== Scoring ===
- First goal of the championship
  - Brian Hogan for Tipperary against Cork (Munster quarter-final)
- Widest winning margin: 12 points
  - Kilkenny 5-16 - 1-16 Clare (All-Ireland final)
- Most goals in a match: 6
  - Kilkenny 5-16 - 1-16 Clare (All-Ireland final)
- Most points in a match: 44
  - Clare 1-26 - 2-18 Limerick (Munster final)
- Most goals by one team in a match: 5
  - Kilkenny 5-16 - 1-16 Clare (All-Ireland final)
- Highest aggregate score: 53
  - Clare 1-26 - 2-18 Limerick (Munster final)
- Most goals scored by a losing team: 2
  - Wexford 2-14 - 3-14 Kilkenny
  - Waterford 2-12 - 3-20 Clare
  - Limerick 2-18 - 1-26 Clare
