= 2011 All-Ireland Intermediate Hurling Championship =

Championship Details
- Dates: 29 May 2011 – 27 August 2011
- Teams: 8

All Ireland Champions
- Winners: Clare (1st win)
- Captain: Tony Carmody
- Manager: Kevin Kennedy

All Ireland Runners-up
- Runners-up: Kilkenny
- Captain: Adrian Stapleton
- Manager: Pat Hoban

Provincial Champions
- Munster: Clare
- Leinster: Kilkenny
- Ulster: Not Played
- Connacht: Not Played

Championship Statistics
- Matches Played: 7
- Total Goals: 25 (3.5 per game)
- Total Points: 190 (27.1 per game)
- Top Scorer: Niall Gilligan (1-22)

The 2011 All-Ireland Intermediate Hurling Championship was the 28th staging of the All-Ireland hurling championship since its establishment by the Gaelic Athletic Association in 1961. The championship began on 29 May 2011 and ended on 27 August 2011.

Kilkenny were the defending champions, however, they were defeated by Clare who won the title following a 2-13 to 1-11 victory in the final.

== Team summaries ==
| Team | Colours | Most recent success | |
| Team | Colours | All-Ireland | Provincial |
|---|---|---|---|
| Clare | Saffron and blue | | |
| Cork | Red and white | 2009 | 2010 |
| Galway | Maroon and white | 2002 | 2008 |
| Kilkenny | Black and amber | 2010 | 2010 |
| Limerick | Green and white | 1998 | 2008 |
| Tipperary | Blue and gold | 2000 | 2002 |
| Waterford | White and blue | | 2007 |
| Wexford | Purple and gold | 2007 | 2007 |

== Results ==
=== Leinster Intermediate Hurling Championship ===
| 6 July 2011 Final | Kilkenny | 2-15 - 2-13 | Wexford | Nowlan Park |
| | E Murphy (1-7, 0-5 frees, 0-1 65); G Shelly (1-2); A Stapleton (0-3); J.J. Farrell (0-2); K Joyce, W O’Dwyer, W Walsh, S Burke, S Kenny (0-1 each). | Report | T O’Leary, N Higgins (1-1); J O’Connor (0-3, free), B Jordan, P Whitley, C O’Shaughnessy (0-1 each). |

=== Munster Intermediate Hurling Championship ===
| 29 May 2011 Quarter-final | Tipperary | 2-12 - 2-16 | Cork | Semple Stadium |
| | P Ivors 1-2, L Dwan 1-0, R McLoughney (2f), J Ryan (1f) 0-2 each, J McLoughney, T Stapleton (f), P O’Dwyer, D Hickey, E Sweeney, B Fox 0-1 each. | Report | M O’Sullivan 1-2, M Sexton 0-5 (4f), C Casey 1-1, D Drake 0-4 (0-1 sideline), T Murphy 0-2, J Wall, B Corry 0-1 each. | Referee: D O'Driscoll (Limerick) |

| 12 June 2011 Semi-final | Limerick | 2-12 - 2-9 | Waterford | Semple Stadium |
| | D O’Connor 1-4 (0-2f), T Quaid 1-2, D Reale, S O’Brien 0-2, C Allis (0-1 ‘65), S Madden 0-1. | Report | S Power 1-6 (1-0 pen, 0-6f), P Nevin 1-0, D Twomey 0-2. | Referee: J O'Connell (Cork) |

| 19 June 2011 Semi-final | Cork | 0-15 - 2-19 | Clare | Gaelic Grounds |
| | D Drake 0-4, M Sexton (3f), B Corry 0-3 each, E Conway 0-2, M O’Sullivan, K Hartnett, E Brosnan 0-1 each. | Report | N Gilligan 1-5 (0-5f), D Keane 1-2, T Carmody 0-3, R Keane, P Hickey, S Golden 0-2 each, K Moynihan, A Lynch, D O’Rourke 0-1 each. | Referee: S Hourigan (Limerick) |

| 13 July 2011 Final | Clare | 2-15 - 2-13 | Limerick | Cusack Park |
| | N Gilligan 0-6 (4f), R Keane, D Keane 1-2 each, D O'Rourke, P Hickey 0-2 each, T Carmody 0-1. | Report | M Ryan, N Maher 1-1 each, C Allis 0-4 (2 '65s'), S O'Brien, D O'Connor 0-2 each, S Madden, T Quaid, N Kennedy 0-1 each. | Referee: C McAllister (Cork) |

=== All-Ireland Intermediate Hurling Championship ===
| 13 August 2011 Semi-final | Clare | 2-18 - 2-9 | Galway | Cusack Park |
| | N Gilligan (0-8) 4 f’s, 2 ‘65’s, P Hickey (1-4), J O’Connor (1-0), T Carmody (0-2), M Duggan, S Golden, R Keane, K Dilleen (0-1). | Report | K Keehan (1-6) 0-4 f’s, B Murphy (1-2), J O’Leary (0-1) ‘65. | Referee: T Carroll (Offaly) |

| 27 August 2011 Final | Clare | 2-13 - 1-11 | Kilkenny | Semple Stadium |
| | T Carmody, D Keane 1-0 each, N Gilligan 0-3 (2fs), J O’Connor, P Hickey, S Golden 0-2 each, M Duggan, K Dilleen, R Keane, D O’Rourke 0-1 each. | Report | P O’Flynn 1-2, E Hickey, G Aylward, S Burke (2fs) 0-2 each, S Byrne, M Grace (f), C Conway (f) 0-1 each. | Referee: D Kirwan (Cork) |

== Statistics ==
=== Top scorers ===
Overall

| Rank | Player | County | Tally | Total | Matches | Average |
|---|---|---|---|---|---|---|
| 1 | Niall Gilligan | Clare | 1-22 | 25 | 4 | 6.25 |
| 2 | Daire Keane | Clare | 3-4 | 13 | 3 | 4.33 |
| 2 | Padraig Hickey | Clare | 1-10 | 13 | 4 | 3.25 |

Single game

| Rank | Player | County | Tally | Total | Opposition |
|---|---|---|---|---|---|
| 1 | Eoin Murphy | Kilkenny | 1-7 | 10 | Wexford |
| 2 | Stephen Power | Waterford | 1-6 | 9 | Limerick |
| 2 | Kevin Keehan | Galway | 1-6 | 9 | Clare |
| 4 | Niall Gilligan | Clare | 1-5 | 8 | Cork |
| 4 | Niall Gilligan | Clare | 0-8 | 8 | Galway |
| 6 | Denis O'Connor | Limerick | 1-4 | 7 | Waterford |
| 6 | Padraig Hickey | Clare | 1-4 | 7 | Galway |
| 8 | Niall Gilligan | Clare | 0-6 | 6 | Limerick |
| 9 | Ger Shelly | Kilkenny | 1-2 | 5 | Wexford |
| 9 | Phillip Ivors | Tipperary | 1-2 | 5 | Cork |
| 9 | Michael O'Sullivan | Cork | 1-2 | 5 | Tipperary |
| 9 | Tommy Quaid | Limerick | 1-2 | 5 | Waterford |
| 9 | Daire Keane | Clare | 1-2 | 5 | Cork |
| 9 | Ronan Keane | Clare | 1-2 | 5 | Limerick |
| 9 | Daire Keane | Clare | 1-2 | 5 | Limerick |
| 9 | Paul O'Flynn | Kilkenny | 1-2 | 5 | Clare |
