= 1962 All-Ireland Intermediate Hurling Championship =

Championship Details
- Dates: 8 April – 9 September 1962
- Teams: 16

All Ireland Champions
- Winners: Carlow (1st win)
- Captain: Pat Somers

All Ireland Runners-up
- Runners-up: London

Provincial Champions
- Munster: Galway
- Leinster: Carlow
- Ulster: Not Played
- Connacht: Not Played

The 1962 All-Ireland Intermediate Hurling Championship was the second staging of the All-Ireland Intermediate Hurling Championship since its establishment by the Gaelic Athletic Association in 1961. The championship ran from 8 April to 9 September 1962.

Wexford entered the championship as the defending champions, however, they were beaten by Kilkenny in the Leinster Championship.

The All-Ireland final was played at Wexford Park on 9 September 1962 between Carlow and London, in what was their first ever championship meeting. Carlow won the match by 6-15 to 3-03 to claim their first ever All-Ireland title.

== Leinster Intermediate Hurling Championship ==
=== Leinster quarter-finals ===
8 April 1962 Quarter-final	Offaly	4-06 - 1-07	Laois	St. Brendan's Park
	N Dooley 2-1, M Healion 2-0, M Dooley 0-2, J Claffey 0-2, J Lambe 0-1.		P Bates 1-5, M Fitzgerald 0-1, W Bennett 0-1.

8 April 1962 Quarter-final	Wexford	2-08 - 4-09	Kilkenny	O'Kennedy Park
			D White 1-1, J Lynch 1-0, L Brophy 1-0, F Aylward 1-0, P Walsh 0-3, A Comerford 0-3, M Brophy 0-1, N Murphy 0-1.

22 April 1962 Quarter-final	Carlow	8-15 - 1-03	Westmeath	Dr. Cullen Park
	P Brophy 4-0, Mulhall 1-2, Red W Walsh 0-4, W Hogan 0-4, M Morrissey 1-0, M O'Brien 0-2, E Gladney 0-2, Black W Walsh 0-2.		P McDonnell 1-0, Loughlin 0-2.

27 May 1962 Quarter-final	Meath	4-08 - 3-12	Dublin	Páirc Tailteann

=== Leinster semi-finals ===
3 June 1962 Semi-final	Kilkenny	7-10 - 5-13	Offaly	Nowlan Park

10 June 1962 Semi-final	Dublin	3-05 - 7-08	Carlow	Croke Park
	M Bermingham 1-1, L Barry 1-0, M Dempsey 1-0, M Lamb 0-2, C Daly 0-2.		Black W Walsh 3-0, Red W Walsh 2-1, W Hogan 2-1, T Nolan 0-2, M Morrissey 0-2, E Gladney 0-1, P O'Connell 0-1.

=== Leinster final ===
24 June 1962 Final	Carlow	2-11 - 2-03	Kilkenny	O'Kennedy Park
	Red W Walsh 1-3, Black W Walsh 1-0, M Morrissey 0-3, M O'Brien 0-2, P O'Connell 0-1, L Hogan 0-1, E Gladney 0-1.		E Doyle 1-0, M Morrissey 1-0, P Freaney 0-2, E Murphy 0-1.

== Munster Intermediate Hurling Championship ==
=== Munster quarter-finals ===
29 April 1962 Quarter-final	Cork	2-11 - 2-03	Tipperary	Páirc Mac Gearailt
	G Allen 1-2, V Barrett 0-5, L O'Driscoll 1-1, B Ahern 0-1, S Daly 0-1, D O'Driscoll 0-1.		J McCarthy 1-2, O'Meara 1-0, Heffernan 0-1.

29 April 1962 Quarter-final	Kerry	3-03 - 5-05	Waterford	Castleisland Grounds
	M Hennessy 2-1, T Costello 1-0, B McCarthy 0-1, P Hennessy 0-1.		J Whelan 3-1, V Long 1-1, J Hobbart 1-0, JB McCarthy 0-2, P Kennelly 0-1.

6 May 1962 Quarter-final	Clare	0-09 - 1-10	Limerick	Gaelic Grounds
	P Ryan 0-4, C Ryan 0-2, P Mullins 0-1, S McKenna 0-1, J McGrath 0-1.		M Noone 1-1, M Treacy 0-3, M McKenna 0-1, M O'Donoghue 0-1, B Hartigan 0-1, M O'Brien 0-1, P Kiely 0-1, J Shanahan 0-1.

=== Munster semi-finals ===
14 May 1962 Semi-final	Waterford	2-02 - 4-09	Galway	Walsh Park
	V Long 1-1, T Geary 1-0, J Whelan 0-1.		J O'Donoghue 3-2, M King 1-1, L Marmion 0-3, P Mitchell 0-1, M Curtin 0-1, P Egan 0-1.

3 June 1962 Semi-final	Limerick	4-03 - 4-18	Cork	Gaelic Grounds
	M Treacy 1-1, J Begley 1-0, B McLoughlin 1-0, P Kiely 1-0, B Hartigan 0-2.		C Nyhan 2-4, V Barrett 0-10, M O'Brien 1-1, DJ Daly 1-1, R Sisk 0-1, P Behan 0-1.

=== Munster final ===
24 June 1962 Final	Galway	5-04 - 4-06	Cork	Gaelic Grounds
	J O'Donoghue 2-0, S Devlin 1-3, P Egan 1-0, L Marmion 1-0, M King 0-1.		V Barrett 3-3, P Behan 1-0, S Daly 0-1, M O'Brien 0-1, L O'Driscoll 0-1.	Referee: A Murphy (Tipperary)

== All-Ireland Intermediate Hurling Championship ==
=== All-Ireland home final ===
26 August 1961 Home final	Carlow	3-09 - 2-05	Galway	St. Brendan's Park
	M Morrissey 1-3, Black W Walsh 2-0, Red W Walsh 0-3, P Connell 0-2, W Hogan 0-1.		M Curtin 2-3, P Egan 0-1, K O'Shaughnessy 0-1.	Referee: S Spain (Offaly)

=== All-Ireland final ===
9 September 1961 Final	Carlow	6-15 - 3-03	London	Wexford Park
	Black W Walsh 2-3, W Hogan 2-2, Red W Walsh 0-5, E Gladney 1-0, C Hynes 1-0, T Nolan 0-2, M Morrissey 0-2, P Nolan 0-1.		T Morrissey 2-0, W Dargan 1-1, T Cleary 0-1, P Spillane 0-1.	Referee: G Fitzgerald (Limerick)
