= Fearghal Flannery =

Galway hurling goalkeeper

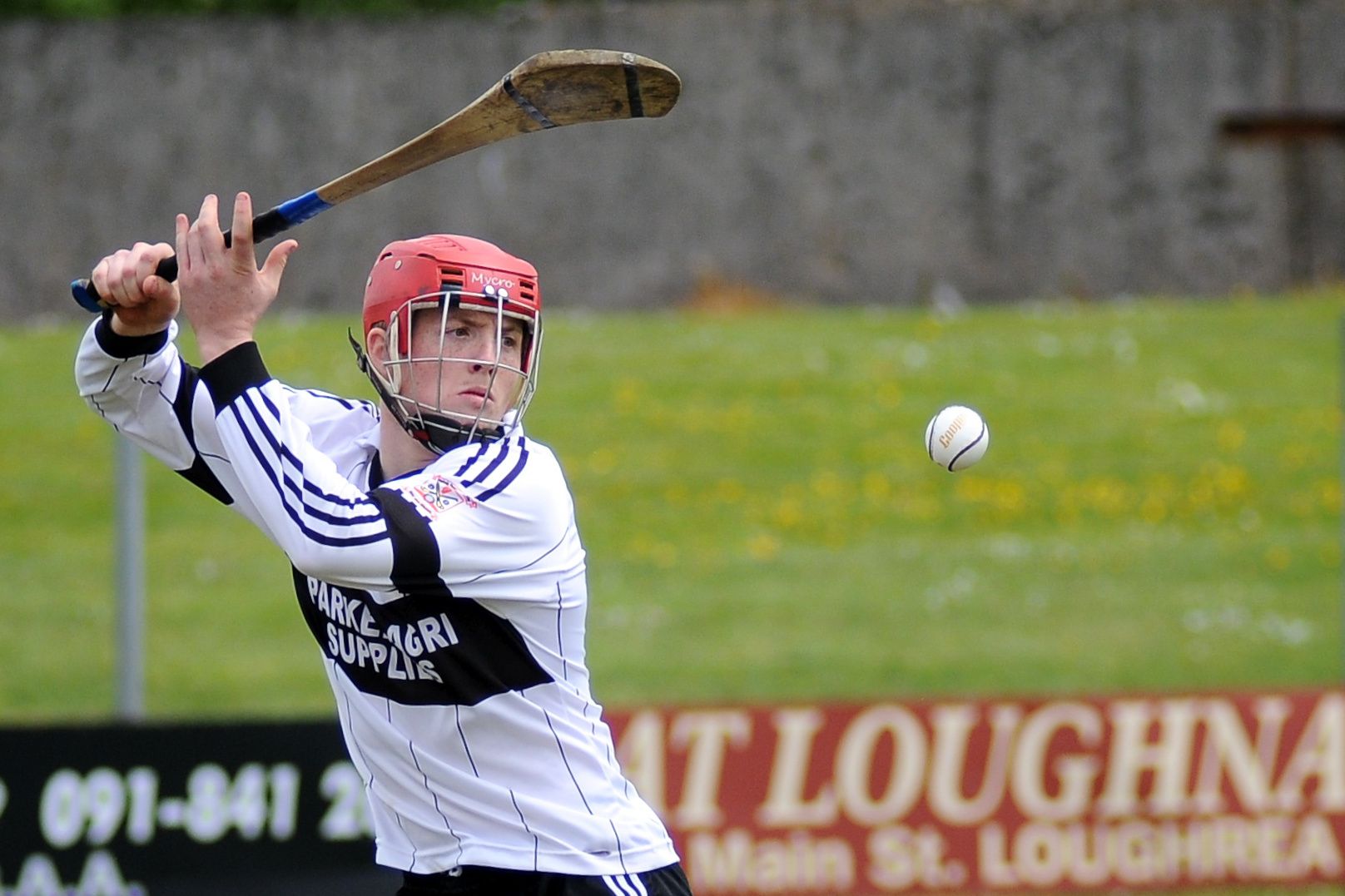
- Fearghal Flannery in action for Pádraig Pearse's against Kiltormer in the 2013 Galway Senior Hurling Championship

Personal information
- Native name: Fearghal Ó Flannabhra (Irish)
- Born: 3 January 1991 (age 35) Ballinasloe, Ireland
- Height: 1.82 m (6 ft 0 in)

Sport
- Sport: Hurling
- Position: Goalkeeper
Club
- Years: Club
- 2008–: Pádraig Pearse's
Inter-county
Years	County	Apps (scores)
2012–	Galway	2 (0–0)
Inter-county titles
- Leinster titles: 1

Fearghal Flannery (born 3 January 1991) is an Irish hurler who formerly played as a substitute goalkeeper for the Galway senior team.

Flannery joined the team as sub-goalie to James Skehill during the 2012 championship. An All-Ireland medalist in the minor grade, Flannery has won one Leinster medal in the senior grade as a non-playing substitute.

Flannery came on in the second half of the 2012 All-Ireland Senior Final replay for his championship debut, to replace the injured James Skehill.

At club level Flannery plays with the Pádraig Pearse's club.
