= Ulster Intermediate Hurling Championship =

- Code: Hurling
- Founded: 1966; 59 years ago
- Abolished: 1998
- Region: (Republic of Ireland) Ireland (GAA)
- No. of teams: 9
- Last Title holders: Down (4th title)
- Most titles: Antrim (5 titles)
- Official website: Official website

The Ulster Intermediate Hurling Championship is an inter county competition between the Intermediate Hurling county teams in the province of Ulster in Ireland. The series of games are organised by the Ulster Council.

The winners of the Ulster Intermediate Hurling Championship each year progress to play the other provincial champions for a chance to win the All-Ireland Intermediate Hurling Championship. The competition has not been played since 1999. In 2000, Down and London took part in open draw portion of the All-Ireland Championship. Hurling is not strong enough in the province to keep the championship in existence. Only Antrim is capable of fielding a second team. In fact, prior to the establishment of this championship, Antrim competed in the Leinster Intermediate Hurling Championship from 1961 until 1965.

== Roll of honour ==
=== Performance by county ===
County	Titles	Runners-up	Years won	Years runner-up
Antrim	5	3	1966, 1967, 1969, 1970, 1973	1968, 1971, 1972
Down	4	5	1968, 1971, 1972, 1998	1966, 1967, 1969, 1970, 1973
Derry	1	0	1997	—
London	0	1	—	1998
Armagh	0	1	—	1997

=== Performance by province ===
County	Titles	Runners-up	Total
Ulster	10	9	19
Britain	0	1	1

== List of finals ==
Year	Winners		Runners-up	
Year	County	Score	County	Score
2000–	Discontinued			
1999	No competition			
1998	Down	3-11	London	2-12
1997	Derry	6-18	Armagh	1-06
1974–1996	No competition			
1973	Antrim	3-11	Down	1-06
1972	Down	3-13, 2-09	Antrim	5-07, 1-10
1971	Down	5-08	Antrim	1-12
1970	Antrim	5-10	Down	3-13
1969	Antrim	5-06	Down	3-09
1968	Down	4-05	Antrim	2-09
1967	Antrim	6-13	Down	2-07
1966	Antrim	3-11	Down	4-05

== See also ==
- Ulster Senior Hurling Championship
- Ulster Junior Hurling Championship
- All-Ireland Intermediate Hurling Championship
  - Connacht Intermediate Hurling Championship
  - Leinster Intermediate Hurling Championship
  - Munster Intermediate Hurling Championship
