= 1966 All-Ireland Intermediate Hurling Championship =

All Ireland Champions
- Winners: Tipperary (2nd win)
- Captain: Bill O'Grady

All Ireland Runners-up
- Runners-up: Dublin

Provincial Champions
- Munster: Tipperary
- Leinster: Dublin
- Ulster: Antrim
- Connacht: Not Played

The 1966 All-Ireland Intermediate Hurling Championship was the sixth staging of the All-Ireland Intermediate Hurling Championship since its establishment by the Gaelic Athletic Association in 1961.

Cork entered the championship as the defending champions, however, they were beaten by Tipperary in the Munster semi-final.

The All-Ireland final was played at St. Patrick's Park in Enniscorthy on 18 September 1966 between Tipperary and Dublin, in what was their first ever meeting in the final. Tipperary won the match by 4-11 to 2-12 to claim their second All-Ireland title overall and a first title in three years.

== Munster Intermediate Hurling Championship ==
=== Munster quarter-finals ===
17 April 1966 Quarter-final	Kerry	3-05 - 4-08	Cork	Fr. Breen Park
	D Lovett 1-3, J Culloty 1-1, T McGrath 1-0, P Finnegan 0-1.		D Coleman 2-1, J O'Connell 1-2, P Hegarty 1-1, T Corbett 0-4.

24 April 1966 Quarter-final	Tipperary	2-06 - 0-03	Waterford	Clonmel Sportsground
	W O'Grady 1-3, M Jones 1-2, N O'Shea 0-1.		F Moran 0-1, A Browne 0-1, M Tobin 0-1.

22 May 1966 Quarter-final	Clare	8-06 - 8-03	Limerick	Cusack Park
	M Keane 2-3, J Teeffy 2-1, J McMahon 2-0, M O'Leary 1-0, J Keane 0-1, P Henchy 0-1.		A Dunworth 4-3, P Healy 2-0, T Hickey 1-0, G Cagney 1-0.

=== Munster semi-finals ===
29 May 1966 Semi-final	Tipperary	2-11 - 2-07	Cork	Seán Treacy Park
	M Jones 0-5, W O'Grady 1-1, T Brennan 1-1, J Fogarty 0-2, M Cooney 0-1, N O'Gorman 0-1.		J O'Connell 2-1, T Corbett 0-3, N O'Regan 0-1, J O'Flynn 0-1, D Coleman 0-1.

29 May 1966 Semi-final	Galway	4-16 - 4-01	Clare	Duggan Park
	M Derivan 2-4, M Hanley 1-1, B Lally 0-5, M Devlin 1-0, B O'Connor 0-3, S Devlin 0-2, M Hoare 0-1.		J Smith 2-0, J McNamara 1-0, M Keane 1-0, J Teefy 0-1.

=== Munster final ===
10 July 1966 Final	Galway	1-07 - 4-02	Tipperary	Duggan Park
	S Dillon 1-1, M Derivan 0-2, B Geraghty 0-1, M Devlin 0-1, K Kennedy 0-1, N Treacy 0-1.		P McLoughlin 1-0, T Brennan 1-0, M Jones 1-0, S Kenny 1-0, W O'Grady 0-1, D Dunne 0-1.

== All-Ireland Intermediate Hurling Championship ==
=== All-Ireland semi-final ===
21 August 1966 Semi-final	Antrim	3-06 - 4-10	Dublin	Casement Park
	S Burns 1-3, B McGarry 1-0, S Gallagher 1-0, P McShane 0-1, S McMullan 0-1, B McGurk 0-1.		E Flynn 0-5, D Doody 1-1, H Kinsella 1-1, T Burke 1-0, S Sunderland 1-0, P Dalton 0-1, T Woods 0-1, T Cunningham 0-1.

21 August 1966 Semi-final	Tipperary	6-17 - 2-09	London	Páirc Daibhín
	S Kenny 2-4, M Jones 2-3, T Brennan 2-2, J Fogarty 0-4, S Noonan 0-2, L Connolly 0-2.		E Murray 1-3, M Power 1-2, A Gordon 0-2, L Murphy 0-2.

=== All-Ireland final ===
18 September 1966 Final	Tipperary	4-11 - 2-12	Dublin	St. Patrick's Park
	S Kenny 2-2, M Jones 0-7, T Brennan 1-2, L Connolly 1-0.		E Flynn 0-8, D Doody 1-2, N Kinsella 1-0, S Armstrong 0-1, H Dalton 0-1.
