= 1967 All-Ireland Intermediate Hurling Championship =

All Ireland Champions
- Winners: London (1st win)
- Captain: Willie Barnaville

All Ireland Runners-up
- Runners-up: Cork
- Captain: Paddy Dunne

Provincial Champions
- Munster: Cork
- Leinster: Kilkenny
- Ulster: Antrim
- Connacht: Not Played

The 1967 All-Ireland Intermediate Hurling Championship was the seventh staging of the All-Ireland Intermediate Hurling Championship since its establishment by the Gaelic Athletic Association in 1961.

Tipperary entered the championship as the defending champions, however, they were beaten by Cork in the Munster quarter-final.

The All-Ireland final was played at the Gaelic Grounds in Limerick on 17 September 1967 between London and Cork, in what was their second All-Ireland final meeting and a first in two years. London won the match by 1-09 to 1-05 to claim their first ever All-Ireland title.

== Munster Intermediate Hurling Championship ==
=== Munster quarter-finals ===
9 April 1967 Quarter-final	Cork	3-12 - 1-01	Tipperary	Páirc Mac Gearailt
	J O'Connell 2-0, JK Coleman 1-2, T Browne 0-4, R Ennis 0-2, P Hegarty 0-1, J Hogan 0-1, W Fitton 0-1, P Curley 0-1.		T Ryan 1-0, W Moloughney 0-1.

9 April 1967 Quarter-final	Waterford	4-08 - 3-08	Kerry	Fraher Field
	J Regan 1-4, J Rooney 2-0, M Walsh 1-1, N Power 0-3.		D Lovett 2-4, E Sullivan 1-0, E Diggins 0-2, P Finnegan 0-1, J Barry 0-1.

9 April 1967 Quarter-final	Limerick	5-05 - 4-04	Clare	Gaelic Grounds
	L Hogan 2-1, P O'Brien 1-4, J McGrath 2-0.		M Clune 2-0, J McNamara 1-1, P Daly 1-0, J Cullinane 0-2, J Teefey 0-1.

=== Munster semi-finals ===
28 May 1967 Semi-final	Cork	4-14 - 3-09	Waterford	Clonmult Memorial Park
	J O'Connell 3-2, T Ryan 0-7, JK Coleman 1-0, M Kenneally 0-3, T Browne 0-1, W Fitton 0-1.		B Dunphy 1-1, P O'Grady 1-1, N Power 0-4, L O'Rourke 1-0, S Reid 0-2, M White 0-1.

18 June 1967 Semi-final	Limerick	6-11 - 1-05	Galway	MacDonagh Park
	J McGrath 3-2, P O'Brien 1-3, L Moloney 1-2, C McCarthy 1-1, L Hogan 0-2, T Ryan 0-1.		L Carlos 1-0, K Hanniffy 0-1, P Fahy 0-1, T Quinn 0-1, M McTigue 0-1, S Canning 0-1.

=== Munster final ===
23 July 1967 Final	Cork	5-14 - 2-12	Limerick	Buttevant Sportsfield
	JK Coleman 2-4, T Ryan 0-6, D Coleman 1-1, J O'Connell 1-1, W Fitton 1-0, J Hogan 0-1, P Murphy 0-1.		L Hogan 0-6, L Moloney 2-0, P Hartnett 0-3, P O'Brien 0-2, T Markham 0-1.	Referee: M Slattery (Clare)

== All-Ireland Intermediate Hurling Championship ==
=== All-Ireland quarter-final ===
30 July 1967 Quarter-final	Antrim	6-13 - 2-07	Roscommon	Casement Park
	B McGarry 2-4, E Donnelly 2-4, W Richmond 1-3, PJ McCamphill 1-0, S Burns 0-1, P McSHane 0-1.		G Keane 1-3, P Healy 1-0, G Flanagan 0-2, J Keane 0-1, R Fallon 0-1.

=== Munster semi-finals ===
27 August 1967 Semi-final	Cork	4-06 - 2-06	Antrim	Páirc Uí Chaoimh
	D Daly 2-0, JK Coleman 1-1, M Kenneally 1-1, J Hogan 0-1, D O'Connell 0-1, P Ryan 0-1, P Murphy 0-1.		S Burns 1-0, B Campbell 1-0, B McGarry 0-2, S Richmond 0-1, D McMullen 0-1, P McShane 0-1, S Richmond 0-1.	Referee: P Buggy (Kilkenny)

27 August 1967 Semi-final	Kilkenny	2-07 - 2-11	London	Nowlan Park
	O Harrington 1-3, W Harte 1-1, T Ryan 0-1, L Ryan 0-1, J Doherty 0-1.		E Murray 0-7, J Horgan 1-0, D O'Keeffe 1-0, T Connolly 0-3, T Cleary 0-1.	Referee: S Power (Waterford)

=== All-Ireland final ===
17 September 1967 Final	London	1-09 - 1-05	Cork	Gaelic Grounds
	D O'Keeffe 1-2, P Fahy 0-2, S Lamb 0-2, M Loughnane 0-1, E Murray 0-1, R Cashin 0-1.		J Coleman 1-2, T Ryan 0-1, M Kenneally 0-1, J O'Connell 0-1.	Referee: J Hatton (Wicklow)
