= Connacht Intermediate Hurling Championship =

- Region: Connacht (GAA)
- Number of teams: 2
- Current champions: Mayo

The Connacht Intermediate Hurling Championship is an inter county competition between the intermediate hurling county teams in the province of Connacht in Ireland. The series of games are organised by the Connacht Council. The winners of the Connacht Intermediate Hurling Championship progress to play the other provincial champions for a chance to win the All-Ireland Intermediate Hurling Championship.

The competition has not been played since 1999, and Galway has represented the province in the All-Ireland series. The other counties in the province are not strong enough to field a second hurling team for this competition.

Intermediate level Connacht counties now compete in the Christy Ring Cup and all-Connacht matches in the Christy Ring Cup are doubled-up as Connacht Intermediate Championship matches.

== History ==
First held in the mid 20th century, the competition has not been played since 1999. Since that time, Galway has represented the province in the All-Ireland series. The other counties in the province are not strong enough to field a second hurling team for this competition.

Intermediate level Connacht counties now compete in the Christy Ring Cup and all-Connacht matches in the Christy Ring Cup are doubled up as Connacht Intermediate Championship matches.

== Teams ==
=== Eligible teams ===
The championship is currently suspended but four counties would be eligible for the championship:

County	Qualification	Location	Stadium	Province	Championship Titles	Last Championship Title
Galway	Intermediate development team	Galway	Pearse Stadium	Connacht	2	1998
London	Christy Ring Cup team	South Ruislip	McGovern Park	Britain	0	—
New York	First team	Bronx	Gaelic Park	North America	0	—
Sligo	Christy Ring Cup team	Sligo	Markievicz Park	Connacht	0	—

== Roll of honour ==
County	Title(s)	Runners-up	Years won	Years runner-up
Roscommon	3	2	1968, 2013, 2015	1997, 1998
Galway	2	0	1997, 1998	—
Mayo	1	3	1969	1968, 2013, 2015

== List of finals ==
Year	Winners		Runners-up	
Year	County	Score	County	Score
2016–present	No Championship			
2015	Roscommon	2-14	Mayo	0-13
2014	No Championship			
2013	Roscommon	1-11	Mayo	0-12
1999–2012	No Championship			
1998	Galway	2-22	Roscommon	1-11
1997	Galway	7-19	Roscommon	1-07
1973–1996	No Championship			
1970–1972	Galway represented the province			
1969	Mayo			
1968	Roscommon	4-04, 7-11 (R)	Mayo	3-07, 3-05 (R)
1966–1967	Roscommon represented the province			

- Galway participated in the Munster Intermediate Hurling Championship between 1961 and 1969.
- In 1966 and 1967, Roscommon represented the province.
- From 1970 to 1972, Galway represented the province.
- In 1999, Galway represented the province in the All-Ireland series. Roscommon took part in the Open Draw section, and they qualified for the All-Ireland semi-final in which they lost to Galway.

=== Unofficial finals ===
Year	Winners		Runners-up	
Year	County	Score	County	Score
2024	Sligo represented the province			
2023	Sligo	2-26	Mayo	1-23
2022	Mayo	2-24	Sligo	1-20
2021	Sligo	2-18	Roscommon	1-20
2020	Roscommon	0-20	Sligo	0-17
2019	Roscommon represented the province			
2018	Roscommon	1-17	Mayo	0-11
2017	Mayo	1-25	Roscommon	2-12

== See also ==
- All-Ireland Intermediate Hurling Championship
- Munster Intermediate Hurling Championship
- Leinster Intermediate Hurling Championship
- Ulster Intermediate Hurling Championship
- Christy Ring Cup

== Sources ==
- Roll of Honour on gaainfo.com
- Complete Roll of Honour on Kilkenny GAA bible
