= 2015 All-Ireland Intermediate Hurling Championship =

Championship Details
- Dates: 24 May 2015 – 8 August 2015
- Teams: 8

All Ireland Champions
- Winners: Galway (4 win)
- Captain: James Skehill
- Manager: Anthony Cunningham

All Ireland Runners-up
- Runners-up: Cork
- Captain: Kevin Kavanagh
- Manager: Ronan Dwane

Provincial Champions
- Munster: Cork
- Leinster: Galway
- Ulster: Not Played
- Connacht: Not Played

Championship Statistics
- Matches Played: 7
- Total Goals: 14 (2.0 per game)
- Total Points: 253 (36.1 per game)
- Top Scorer: Willie Griffin (2-16)

The 2015 All-Ireland Intermediate Hurling Championship was the 32nd staging of the All-Ireland hurling championship for players in the intermediate grade since its establishment by the Gaelic Athletic Association in 1961. The championship began on 26 May 2015 and ended on 8 August 2015.

Cork were the defending champions, however, they were defeated by 0-23 to 0-14 by Galway in the final.

== Team summaries ==
Team	Colours	Most recent success	
Team	Colours	All-Ireland	Provincial
Clare	Saffron and blue		2011
Cork	Red and white	2014	2014
Galway	Maroon and white	2002	2008
Kilkenny	Black and amber	2010	2013
Limerick	Green and white	1998	2008
Tipperary	Blue and gold	2013	2013
Waterford	White and blue		2007
Wexford	Purple and gold	2007	2014

== Results ==
=== Leinster Intermediate Hurling Championship ===
1 July 2015 Semi-final	Kilkenny	1-17 - 3-22	Galway	O'Connor Park
19:30	R Hickey 0-5 (2f, 2 65) J Hayes 0-4, G Malone 1-1, M Rice 0-3, L Blanchfield 0-2 N Doherty 0-1, M Maloney 0-1.	Report	S Moloney 1-10, C Whelan 2-2, B Molloy 0-4, E Brannigan 0-3, J Regan 0-1, K McHugo 0-1, E Burke 0-1.

15 July 2015 Final	Wexford	0-11 - 1-20	Galway	O'Moore Park
19:30	J Kelly 0-8 (6 fs), J Berry, T Dwyer, M O’Hanlon 0-1 each.	Report	B Molloy 1-4, S Moloney 0-4 (2 fs, 1 ’65), P Flaherty and T Haran 0-3 each, R O’Meara 0-2, É Burke, P Flaherty, D Nevin, C Whelan 0-1 each.

=== Munster Intermediate Hurling Championship ===
24 May 2015 Quarter-final	Limerick	3-14 - 2-15	Clare	Semple Stadium
14:00	W Griffin 2-6 (0-3f), M Fitzgerald 1-0, D Byrnes 0-3 (2f, 1 65), W Hickey & M Carmody 0-2 each, K O’Brien 0-1.	Report	I Galvin 1-5 (0-4f), D Conroy 0-4, R Taylor 1-0, M O’Malley 0-3 (1f), S McGrath, S Ward & D Moloney 0-1 each.	Referee: J O'Brien (Tipperary)

7 June 2015 Semi-final	Waterford	1-16 - 0-27	Cork	Semple Stadium
14:00	O Connors 1-8 (0-8f), T Waring 0-3, P Walsh 0-2, J Dee, T Connors & M O’Brien 0-1 each.	Report	N McNamara 0-7 (4f, 2 65s), D Flynn, W Leahy & D O’Donovan (3f) 0-3 each, A Cagney, M Collins, F O’Leary, T Murphy & J Sheehan 0-2 each, S McCarthy 0-1.	Referee: D Fox (Clare)

21 June 2015 Semi-final	Limerick	1-23 - 2-13	Tipperary	Gaelic Grounds
14:00	T Morrissey (1-3), W Griffin (0-5, 2 frees), D Byrnes (0-4, 3 frees, 1 65), M Carmody, and M Fitzgibbon (0-3 each), A Brennan (0-2), R O’Donnell, T Quaid and M Fitzgerald (0-1 each.)	Report	L McGrath 1-5 (0-4f), K Morris 1-1 (0-1f), A Ryan 0-4, D Butler, D Flynn & J Cahill 0-1 each.	Referee: T Walsh (Waterford)

8 July 2015 Final	Cork	0-20 - 0-18	Limerick	Páirc Uí Rinn
19:30	N McNamara (0-8, 7f), T Murphy (0-4), W Leahy, K O'Neill, D O'Donovan (2f) (0-2 each), M Collins, S McCarthy, (0-1 each).	Report	W Griffin (4f), D Byrnes (2f) (0-5 each,) T Morrissey (0-4), R O’Donnell, R English, M Fitzgibbon, D O’Donovan (0-1 each).	Referee: D Fox (Clare)

=== All-Ireland Intermediate Hurling Championship ===
8 August 2015 Final	Cork	0-14 - 0-23	Galway	Gaelic Grounds
19:00	N McNamara (0-4fs), T Murphy (2fs), W Leahy, F O’Leary (0-3 each), K O’Neill (0-1).	Report	T Haran (4fs, 1 sideline), D Nevin (0-5 each), D Higgins (0-3), K McHugo, E Burke, S Moloney, E Brannigan, J Kennedy (0-2 each).	Referee: F Horgan (Tipperary)

== Statistics ==
=== Top scorers ===
Overall

Rank	Player	County	Tally	Total	Matches	Average
1	Willie Griffin	Limerick	2-16	22	3	7.33
2	Shane Moloney	Galway	1-16	19	3	6.33
2	Noel McNamara	Cork	0-19	19	3	6.33
4	Brian Molloy	Galway	1-8	11	3	3.66
5	Diarmaid Byrnes	Limerick	0-12	12	3	4.00

Single game

Rank	Player	County	Tally	Total	Opposition
1	Shane Moloney	Galway	1-10	13	Kilkenny
2	Willie Griffin	Limerick	2-6	12	Clare
3	Owen Connors	Waterford	1-8	11	Cork
4	Conor Whelan	Galway	2-2	8	Kilkenny
4	Ian Galvin	Clare	1-5	8	Limerick
4	Liam McGrath	Tipperary	1-5	8	Limerick
4	Noel McNamara	Cork	0-8	8	Limerick
4	Joe Kelly	Wexford	0-8	8	Galway
9	Brian Molloy	Galway	1-4	7	Wexford
9	Noel McNamara	Cork	0-7	7	Waterford

=== Scoring ===
- First goal of the championship
  - Ian Galvin for Clare against Limerick (Munster quarter-final)
- Widest winning margin: 12 points
  - Galway 1-20 - 0-11 Wexford (Leinster final)
- Most goals in a match: 5
  - Limerick 3-14 - 2-15 Clare (Munster quarter-final)
- Most points in a match: 43
  - Waterford 1-16 - 0-27 Cork (Munster semi-final)
- Most goals by one team in a match: 3
  - Limerick 3-14 - 2-15 Clare (Munster quarter-final)
  - Galway 3-22 - 1-17 Kilkenny (Leinster semi-final)
- Highest aggregate score: 51
  - Galway 3-22 - 1-17 Kilkenny (Leinster semi-final)
- Most goals scored by a losing team: 2
  - Clare 2-15 - 3-14 Limerick (Munster quarter-final)
  - Tipperary 2-13 - 1-23 Limerick (Munster semi-final)

=== Miscellaneous ===
- Galway, a team who have faced no competition in their own province for a number of years, enter the Leinster championship for the first time. They later claim their first ever Leinster title.
