= 2014 All-Ireland Intermediate Hurling Championship =

Championship Details
- Dates: 25 May – 9 August 2015
- Teams: 8

All Ireland Champions
- Winners: Cork (8th win)
- Captain: John O'Callaghan
- Manager: Liam Hayes

All Ireland Runners-up
- Runners-up: Wexford
- Manager: Larry Doyle

Provincial Champions
- Munster: Cork
- Leinster: Wexford
- Ulster: Not Played
- Connacht: Not Played

Championship Statistics
- Matches Played: 7
- Total Goals: 26 (3.7 per game)
- Total Points: 222 (31.7 per game)
- Top Scorer: Peter O'Brien (0-46)

The 2014 All-Ireland Intermediate Hurling Championship was the 31st staging of the All-Ireland hurling championship for players in the intermediate grade since its establishment by the Gaelic Athletic Association in 1961. The championship began on 25 May 2014 and ended on 9 August 2014.

Tipperary were the defending champions, however, they were defeated in the provincial decider. Cork won the title after defeating Wexford by 2-18 to 2-12 in the All-Ireland final.

== Team summaries ==
Team	Colours	Most recent success	
Team	Colours	All-Ireland	Provincial
Clare	Saffron and blue		2011
Cork	Red and white	2009	2010
Galway	Maroon and white	2002	2008
Kilkenny	Black and amber	2010	2013
Limerick	Green and white	1998	2008
Tipperary	Blue and gold	2013	2013
Waterford	White and blue		2007
Wexford	Purple and gold	2007	2007

== Results ==
=== Leinster Intermediate Hurling Championship ===
23 July 2014 Final	Kilkenny	0-14 - 2-11	Wexford	Nowlan Park
	W Phelan (0-5, two frees), O McGrath, W O'Dwyer, J Brennan (0-2 each), M Grace (0-2, one fee), P Phelan (0-1).	Report	J Barry (0-5, two frees), J Reck (1-1), R Barry (1-0), T Dwyer, G Doran, M O'Hanlon, B Doran (0-1 each), J Lawlor (0-1 free).	Referee: D Harrington (Dublin)

=== Munster Intermediate Hurling Championship ===
25 May 2014 Quarter-final	Cork	1-21 - 3-9	Waterford	Semple Stadium
14:00	P O'Brien 0-13 (0-8f), J Wall 1-1, C Casey 0-2, C Murphy, J Cronin, M O'Sullivan, R Crowley, C Spillane 0-1 each.	Report	K Fitzgerald 0-7 (0-5f), R Donnelly 2-0, G Crotty 1-0, T Ryan 0-1.	Referee: D O'Driscoll (Limerick)

1 June 2014 Semi-final	Tipperary	3-17 - 1-22 (AET)	Limerick	Semple Stadium
14:00	T O’Brien 1-6 (0-5fs), T Heffernan 1-3, K Fox 1-1, M Sheedy, D Collins 0-2 each, A McGrath (’65′), T Cleary, J Sheedy 0-1 each.	Report	W Griffin 0-8 (5fs, 1 ’65′), M Ryan 1-2, D O’Neill, M Fitzgerald, P Leahy 0-3 each, A Brennan, P Ryan, R Ryan 0-1 each.	Referee: D Fox (Laois)

15 June 2014 Semi-final	Clare	2-20 - 4-17	Cork	Semple Stadium
14:00	B Duggan (1-10, 0-8fs), C Malone (1-2), P Fitzgerald (0-2), S Gleeson, S McGrath, M O’Neill, A Lynch, C O’Connell, G O’Connell (0-1 each).	Report	P O’Brien (0-8, 4fs), M O’Sullivan, D Drake (2-1 each), C Murphy (0-2), R Cashman, M Walsh, J Cronin, R Crowley, K Hallissey (0-1 each).	Referee: J O'Brien (Tipperary)

25 June 2014 Final	Tipperary	2-8 - 4-15	Cork	Páirc Uí Rinn
19:30	M Sheedy, K Morris 1-0 each, T O'Brien (3fs), A McGrath (2 '65', 1f) 0-3 each, K Fox, J Sheedy 0-1 each	Report	D Drake 3-0, P O'Brien 0-4 (4fs), M Sugrue 1-1, J Cronin, M O'Sullivan 0-3 each, C Murphy 0-2 (0-1f), C Casey, C Barry 0-1 each	Referee: D O'Driscoll (Limerick)

=== All-Ireland Intermediate Hurling Championship ===
26 July 2014 Semi-final	Galway	0-17 - 0-21	Cork	O'Connor Park
14:45	S Maloney 0-4 (3f, 1 ’65), D Higgins 0-3 (3f), R O’Meara, D Dolan, B Molloy, A Tuohy 0-2 each, E Burke, J Carr 0-1 each.	Report	P O’Brien 0-13 (7f), M Walsh 0-3, C Murphy, C Spillane 0-2 each, J Cronin 0-1.	Referee: J Keenan (Wicklow)

9 August 2014 Final	Wexford	2-12 - 2-18	Cork	Nowlan Park
15:00	N Kirwan (1-2), T Dwyer (2fs), E Kent (3fs) (0-3 each), R Barry (1-0), P Murphy (0-2), B Jordan, J Berry (0-1 each).	Report	P O’Brien (0-8, five frees), C Casey (0-4), M O’Sullivan, D Drake (1-1 each), B Lawton (0-2), J Cronin, A Spillane (0-1 each).	Referee: A Kelly (Galway)

== Statistics ==
=== Top scorers ===
Overall

Rank	Player	County	Tally	Total	Matches	Average
1	Peter O'Brien	Cork	0-46	46	5	9.20
2	David Drake	Cork	6-2	20	5	4.00
3	Bobby Duggan	Clare	1-10	13	1	13.00
4	Tony O'Brien	Tipperary	1-9	12	2	6.00
5	Michael O'Sullivan	Cork	3-6	15	5	3.00

Single game

Rank	Player	County	Tally	Total	Opposition
1	Bobby Duggan	Clare	1-10	13	Cork
1	Peter O'Brien	Cork	0-13	13	Waterford
1	Peter O'Brien	Cork	0-13	13	Galway
4	David Drake	Cork	3-0	9	Tipperary
4	Tony O'Brien	Tipperary	1-6	9	Limerick
6	Peter O'Brien	Cork	0-8	8	Clare
6	Willie Griffin	Limerick	0-8	8	Tipperary
6	Peter O'Brien	Cork	0-8	8	Wexford
9	David Drake	Cork	2-1	7	Clare
9	Michael O'Sullivan	Cork	2-1	7	Clare
9	Killian Fitzgerald	Waterford	0-7	7	Cork
