= All-Ireland Intermediate Hurling Championship =

Gaelic sport tournament

- Irish: Craobh Idimhéanach Iomána na hÉireann
- Code: Hurling
- Founded: 1961; 65 years ago
- Abolished: 2019
- Region: (Republic of Ireland) Ireland (GAA)
- Trophy: Michael Cusack Cup
- No. of teams: 2
- Last Title holders: Cork (9th title)
- Most titles: Cork (9 titles)
- Official website: Official website

The GAA Hurling Intermediate All-Ireland Championship, known simply as the All-Ireland Intermediate Championship, was an annual inter-county hurling competition organised by the Gaelic Athletic Association (GAA). Effectively contested by the second string teams of the top inter-county hurling sides in Ireland, the tournament took place every year between 1997 and 2018—having originally been run between 1961 and 1973.

The final served as the culmination of a series of games played during the early summer, and the results determined which team receives the Michael Cusack Cup. The All-Ireland Championship was always played on a straight knockout basis whereby once a team loses they were eliminated from the championship, however, the qualification procedures for the championship changed several times throughout its history. In the final editions of the competition, qualification was limited to teams competing in the Leinster Championship and the Munster Championship.

The most successful teams came from the province of Munster, with teams representing this province winning a total of 17 All-Ireland titles.

The title was won by 11 different teams, 6 of whom have won the title more than once. The all-time record-holders are Cork, who won the championship on 9 occasions. Cork were also the last champions.

== History ==
=== Creation ===
The Commission for the Improvement and Spread of Hurling had suggested the introduction of a new grade to improve the standard of hurling. It was also hoped that a new grade would prove successful in bridging the gap between the junior and senior grades. At the GAA's annual Congress in April 1960, the All-Ireland Intermediate Hurling Championship won the approval of the delegates. It was the fourth All-Ireland championship to be created after the corresponding championships in senior (1887), junior (1912) and minor (1928).

=== Beginnings ===
The inaugural All-Ireland Championship in 1961 used a provincial format, with teams contesting the respective championships in Leinster and Munster. Galway continued with their policy of competing in the Munster Championship in all grades, while Antrim, a team who faced little competition in Ulster, competed in the Leinster Championship.

Dublin and Antrim contested the very first championship match on Sunday 2 April 1961 at Croke Park, Dublin. The inaugural All-Ireland final took place on 17 September 1961, with Wexford defeating London to take the title.

=== Format ===
The first five All-Ireland Championships featured the Leinster and Munster champions contesting the All-Ireland home final, with the winners of that game facing London in the All-Ireland final proper. Semi-finals were introduced in 1966 as the respective champions from Connacht and Ulster entered the All-Ireland series for the first time. After winning the All-Ireland title for the second year in succession, London left the intermediate grade in 1969. Because of this, the All-Ireland series was reduced to two semi-finals and a final.

In 1970, Galway became the sole representatives of Connacht and gained automatic entry to the All-Ireland semi-finals. The format of facing a British team in the All-Ireland final returned with the entry of Warwickshire to the All-Ireland series.

Following the conclusion of the 1973 championship, the All-Ireland Championship was disbanded and replaced with the All-Ireland Senior B Hurling Championship.

At the GAA Congress in 1996, the All-Ireland Championship was reintroduced.

== Format ==
=== Qualification ===
| Province | Championship | Qualifying teams |
|---|---|---|
| Leinster | Leinster Intermediate Hurling Championship | Champions |
| Munster | Munster Intermediate Hurling Championship | Champions |
| Ulster | Ulster Intermediate Hurling Championship | Champions |
| Connacht | Connacht Intermediate Hurling Championship | Champions |
| Britain | British Intermediate Hurling Championship | Champions |

== Trophy and medals ==
At the end of the All-Ireland final, the winning team was presented with a cup. The cup was named in honour of Michael Cusack. GAA Central Council awarded up to twenty-four gold medals to the winners of the All-Ireland final.

== List of finals ==
| Year | Winners | | Runners-up | | Venue | Winning Captain |
| Year | County | Score | County | Score | Venue | Winning Captain |
|---|---|---|---|---|---|---|
| 1961 | Wexford | 3–15 | London | 4–04 | Wexford Park | Larry Byrne |
| 1962 | Carlow | 6–15 | London | 3–03 | Croke Park | Pat Somers |
| 1963 | Tipperary | 1–10 | London | 1–07 | Thurles Sportsfield | Jackie Lanigan |
| 1964 | Wexford | 4–07 | London | 1–11 | O'Kennedy Park | |
| 1965 | Cork | 2–20 | London | 5–05 | Cork Athletic Grounds | Dave Murphy |
| 1966 | Tipperary | 4–11 | Dublin | 2–12 | O'Kennedy Park | Bill O'Grady |
| 1967 | London | 1–09 | Cork | 1–05 | Gaelic Grounds | |
| 1968 | London | 4–15 | Dublin | 0–03 | Croke Park | |
| 1969 | Kildare | 2–08 | Cork | 3–04 | Thurles Sportsfield | Bobby Burke |
| 1970 | Antrim | 3–16 | Warwickshire | 3–13 | Croke Park | Seán Burns |
| 1971 | Tipperary | 3–16 | Wicklow | 3–13 | Nowlan Park | Éamonn Butler |
| 1972 | Tipperary | 2–13 | Galway | 1–09 | St. Brendan's Park | Paddy Kelly |
| 1973 | Kilkenny | 5–15 | London | 2–09 | Walsh Park | Paddy Grace |
| 1974–1996 | Championship suspended | | | | | |
| 1997 | Cork | 2–11 | Galway | 1–12 | Gaelic Grounds | Pat Mulcahy |
| 1998 | Limerick | 4–16 | Kilkenny | 2–17 | Semple Stadium | John Cormican |
| 1999 | Galway | 3–13 | Kilkenny | 2–10 | St. Brendan's Park | Noel Larkin |
| 2000 | Tipperary | 2–17 | Galway | 1–10 | St. Brendan's Park | Declan Corcoran |
| 2001 | Cork | 2–17 | Wexford | 2–08 | Fraher Field | Paddy Barry |
| 2002 | Galway | 2–15 (1–20) | Tipperary | 1–10 (2–17) | St. Brendan's Park | |
| 2003 | Cork | 1–21 | Kilkenny | 0–23 | Semple Stadium | Brendan Lombard |
| 2004 | Cork | 1–16 (2–11) | Kilkenny | 1–10 (2–11) | Semple Stadium | Brendan Walsh |
| 2005 | Wexford | 1–15 | Galway | 0–16 | O'Moore Park | |
| 2006 | Cork | 3–15 | Kilkenny | 1–18 | Fraher Field | Darren Dineen |
| 2007 | Wexford | 1–11 | Waterford | 1–09 | Nowlan Park | |
| 2008 | Kilkenny | 1–16 | Limerick | 0–13 | Semple Stadium | David Prendergast |
| 2009 | Cork | 2–23 | Kilkenny | 0–16 | Semple Stadium | Dara McSweeney |
| 2010 | Kilkenny | 2–17 | Cork | 1–13 | Semple Stadium | Bill Beckett |
| 2011 | Clare | 2–13 | Kilkenny | 1–11 | Semple Stadium | Tony Carmody |
| 2012 | Tipperary | 3–13 | Kilkenny | 1–17 | Semple Stadium | Michael Ryan |
| 2013 | Tipperary | 2–14 | Kilkenny | 2–11 | Nowlan Park | David Young |
| 2014 | Cork | 2–18 | Wexford | 2–12 | Nowlan Park | John O'Callaghan |
| 2015 | Galway | 0–23 | Cork | 0–14 | Gaelic Grounds | James Skehill |
| 2016 | Kilkenny | 5–16 | Clare | 1–16 | Semple Stadium | Nicky Cleere |
| 2017 | Kilkenny | 2–23 | Cork | 2–18 | Páirc Uí Chaoimh | Darragh Brennan |
| 2018 | Cork | 2–19 | Kilkenny | 0–18 | Nowlan Park | Michael Russell |
| 2019– | No championship | | | | | |

== Roll of Honour ==
=== By county ===
| County | Titles | Runners-up | Years won | Years runners-up |
|---|---|---|---|---|
| Cork | 9 | 5 | 1965, 1997, 2001, 2003, 2004, 2006, 2009, 2014, 2018 | 1967, 1969, 2010, 2015, 2017 |
| Tipperary | 7 | 1 | 1963, 1966, 1971, 1972, 2000, 2012, 2013 | 2002 |
| Kilkenny | 5 | 10 | 1973, 2008, 2010, 2016, 2017 | 1998, 1999, 2003, 2004, 2006, 2009, 2011, 2012, 2013, 2018 |
| Wexford | 4 | 2 | 1961, 1964, 2005, 2007 | 2001, 2014 |
| Galway | 3 | 5 | 1999, 2002, 2015 | 1972, 1973, 1997, 2000, 2005 |
| London | 2 | 5 | 1967, 1968 | 1961, 1962, 1963, 1964, 1965 |
| Limerick | 1 | 1 | 1998 | 2008 |
| Clare | 1 | 1 | 2011 | 2016 |
| Carlow | 1 | 0 | 1962 | — |
| Kildare | 1 | 0 | 1969 | — |
| Antrim | 1 | 0 | 1970 | — |
| Dublin | 0 | 2 | — | 1966, 1988 |
| Warwickshire | 0 | 1 | — | 1970 |
| Wicklow | 0 | 1 | — | 1971 |
| Waterford | 0 | 1 | — | 2007 |

=== By province ===
| Division | Titles | Runners-up | Total |
|---|---|---|---|
| Munster | 18 | 9 | 27 |
| Leinster | 11 | 15 | 26 |
| Connacht | 3 | 5 | 8 |
| Britain | 2 | 6 | 8 |
| Ulster | 1 | 0 | 1 |

== Team records and statistics ==
=== Provincial champions by year ===
* = representative of province

| Year | Britain | Connacht | Leinster | Munster | Ulster |
|---|---|---|---|---|---|
| 2018 | — | — | Kilkenny* | Cork* | — |
| 2017 | — | — | Kilkenny | Cork | — |
| 2016 | — | — | Kilkenny | Clare | — |

== See also ==
- All-Ireland Senior Hurling Championship
  - Connacht Senior Hurling Championship
  - Leinster Senior Hurling Championship
  - Munster Senior Hurling Championship
  - Ulster Senior Hurling Championship
- All-Ireland Senior B Hurling Championship
- All-Ireland Intermediate Hurling Championship
  - Connacht Intermediate Hurling Championship
  - Leinster Intermediate Hurling Championship
  - Munster Intermediate Hurling Championship
  - Ulster Intermediate Hurling Championship
- All-Ireland Junior Hurling Championship
  - Connacht Junior Hurling Championship
  - Leinster Junior Hurling Championship
  - Munster Junior Hurling Championship
  - Ulster Junior Hurling Championship
