= Leinster Intermediate Hurling Championship =

Hurling competition in Ireland

Flag of Leinster

The Leinster Intermediate Hurling Championship was an inter county competition between the Intermediate Hurling county teams in the province of Leinster. The Leinster Council organised the competition.

The winners of the championship each year progressed to play the other provincial champions for a chance to win the All-Ireland Intermediate Hurling Championship.

== History ==
The championship was first played in 1961. The championship was abolished in 2017 and the counties now play in the Joe McDonagh Cup and the Christy Ring Cup.

== Teams ==
=== Eligible teams ===
The championship is currently suspended but 9 counties would be eligible for the championship

County	Qualification	Location	Stadium	Province	Championship titles	Last championship title
Dublin	Intermediate development team	Donnycarney	Parnell Park	Leinster	4	1972
Kildare	Christy Ring Cup team	Newbridge	St Conleth's Park	Leinster	1	1969
Kilkenny	Intermediate development team	Kilkenny	Nowlan Park	Leinster	17	2017
Laois	Joe McDonagh Cup team	Portlaoise	O'Moore Park	Leinster	0	—
Meath	Joe McDonagh Cup team	Navan	Páirc Tailteann	Leinster	0	—
Offaly	Joe McDonagh Cup team	Tullamore	O'Connor Park	Leinster	0	—
Westmeath	Joe McDonagh Cup team	Mullingar	Cusack Park	Leinster	0	—
Wexford	Intermediate development team	Wexford	Chadwicks Wexford Park	Leinster	9	2014
Wicklow	Christy Ring Cup team	Aughrim	Aughrim County Ground	Leinster	1	1971

== Qualification for subsequent competitions ==
At the end of the championship, the winning team progressed to the All-Ireland Intermediate Hurling Championship.

== Roll of honour ==
County	Title(s)	Runners-up	Years won	Years runner-up
Kilkenny	17	7	1967, 1973, 1997, 1998, 1999, 2000, 2003, 2004, 2006, 2008, 2009, 2010, 2011, 2012, 2013, 2016, 2017	1962, 1963, 1964, 2002, 2005, 2007, 2014
Wexford	9	14	1961, 1963, 1964, 1965, 2001, 2002, 2005, 2007, 2014	1966, 1972, 1998, 2000, 2004, 2006, 2009, 2010, 2011, 2012, 2013, 2015, 2016, 2017
Dublin	4	3	1966, 1968, 1970, 1972	1971, 2003, 2008
Carlow	1	2	1962	1968, 1997
Wicklow	1	2	1971	1969, 1970
Kildare	1	1	1969	1967
Galway	1	0	2015	—
Antrim	0	1	—	1963
Meath	0	1	—	1973
Laois	0	1	—	1999

== List of finals ==
Year	Winners		Runners-up	
Year	County	Score	County	Score
2018–	No competition			
2017	Kilkenny	1-26	Wexford	1-08
2016	Kilkenny	3-14	Wexford	2-14
2015	Galway	1-20	Wexford	0-11
2014	Wexford	2-11	Kilkenny	0-14
2013	Kilkenny		Wexford	
2012	Kilkenny	3-20	Wexford	2-14
2011	Kilkenny	2-19	Wexford	2-08
2010	Kilkenny	2-16	Wexford	0-13
2009	Kilkenny	0-12	Wexford	0-11
2008	Kilkenny	4-26	Dublin	3-15
2007	Wexford	2-11	Kilkenny	1-12
2006	Kilkenny	2-20	Wexford	0-08
2005	Wexford	0-14	Kilkenny	0-13
2004	Kilkenny	3-17	Wexford	1-10
2003	Kilkenny	4-20	Dublin	1-10
2002	Wexford	2-16	Kilkenny	0-19
2001	Wexford	5-13	Laois	1-09
2000	Kilkenny	2-12	Wexford	1-13
1999	Kilkenny	2-15	Laois	0-09
1998	Kilkenny	3-13	Wexford	0-11
1997	Kilkenny	5-15	Carlow	2-11
1974–96	No Competition			
1973	Kilkenny	11-15	Meath	1-03
1972	Dublin	3-13	Wexford	3-04
1971	Wicklow	1-15	Dublin	2-09
1970	Dublin	4-09	Wicklow	3-10
1969	Kildare	3-16	Wicklow	4-06
1968	Dublin	2-14	Carlow	2-12
1967	Kilkenny	6-08	Kildare	2-08
1966	Dublin	2-09	Wexford	1-08
1965	Wexford	4-16	Antrim	3-08
1964	Wexford	1-09	Kilkenny	2-05
1963	Wexford	3-08	Kilkenny	3-06
1962	Carlow	2-11	Kilkenny	2-03
1961	Wexford	3-11	Dublin	2-10

== Records and statistics ==
=== Top scorers ===
==== By year ====
Year	Top scorer	Team	Score	Total
1972	Noel Kinsella	Dublin	3-05	14
1972	Vinny Holden	Dublin	1-11	14
1973	Shem Muldowney	Kilkenny	4-05	17
1997	Ollie O'Connor	Kilkenny	3-16	25
1998	Henry Shefflin	Kilkenny	1-22	25
1999	Ollie O'Connor	Kilkenny	2-17	13
2000	Ollie O'Connor	Kilkenny	0-18	18
2001	Eddie Cullen	Wexford	1-06	9
2002	Chris McGrath	Wexford	3-16	25
2003	Des Mythen	Wexford	2-07	13
2004	David Buggy	Kilkenny	1-04	7
2005	Stephen Nolan	Wexford	0-05	5
2006	Eddie Walsh	Kilkenny	1-02	5
2006	Michael Murphy	Kilkenny	0-05	5
2006	Eddie O'Donoghue	Kilkenny	0-05	5
2007	Richie Hogan	Kilkenny	0-19	19
2008	Noel Doherty	Kilkenny	2-04	10
2008	Cathal Dunne	Kilkenny	1-07	10
2009	Eoin Guinan	Kilkenny	0-10	10
2010	Eoin Guinan	Kilkenny	0-17	17
2011	Eoin Murphy	Kilkenny	1-07	10
2012	Rory Hickey	Kilkenny	1-07	10
2013	No championship			
2014	Red Barry	Wexford	0-05	5
2014	Willie Phelan	Kilkenny	0-05	5
2015	Shane Moloney	Galway	1-14	17
2016	Tommy Dwyer	Wexford	0-13	13
2017	Robbie Donnelly	ilkenny	0-09	9

== See also ==
- Leinster Senior Hurling Championship
- Leinster Junior Hurling Championship
- All-Ireland Intermediate Hurling Championship
  - Munster Intermediate Hurling Championship
  - Connacht Intermediate Hurling Championship
  - Ulster Intermediate Hurling Championship
