= 2005 All-Ireland Intermediate Hurling Championship =

Championship Details
- Dates: 15 May – 3 September 2005
- Teams: 8

All Ireland Champions
- Winners: Wexford (3rd win)
- Captain: Kevin Kavanagh
- Manager: Séamus Murphy

All Ireland Runners-up
- Runners-up: Galway
- Captain: Enda Tannion
- Manager: Kieran Rabbitte

Provincial Champions
- Munster: Cork
- Leinster: Wexford
- Ulster: Not Played
- Connacht: Not Played

Championship Statistics
- Matches Played: 7
- Total Goals: 8 (1.10 per game)
- Total Points: 198 (28.20 per game)
- Top Scorer: Maurice O'Sullivan (0-25)

The 2005 All-Ireland Intermediate Hurling Championship was the 22nd staging of the All-Ireland hurling championship. The championship began on 15 May 2005 and ended on 3 September 2005.

Cork were the defending champions, however, they were defeated in the All-Ireland semi-final. Wexford won the title after defeating Galway by 1–15 to 0–16 in the final.

== Team summaries ==
Team	Colours	Most recent success	
Team	Colours	All-Ireland	Provincial
Clare	Saffron and blue		
Cork	Red and white	2004	2004
Dublin	Blue and navy		1972
Galway	Maroon and white	2002	1998
Kilkenny	Black and amber	1973	2004
Limerick	Green and white	1998	1998
Tipperary	Blue and gold	2000	2002
Waterford	White and blue		
Wexford	Purple and gold	2002	1964

== Leinster Intermediate Hurling Championship ==
=== Leinster final ===
13 July 2005 Final	Kilkenny	0-13 - 0-14	Wexford	Semple Stadium
	J Power 0-3, M Rice 0-3, W O'Dwyer 0-2, M Phelan 0-2, A Cummins 0-1, K Moore 0-1, E Walsh 0-1.		S Nolan 0-5, S Doyle 0-4, MJ Cooper 0-1, M Byrne 0-1, MJ Furlong 0-1, S O'Neill 0-1, E Cullen 0-1.	Referee: B Gavin (Offaly)

== Munster Intermediate Hurling Championship ==
=== Munster quarter-final ===
15 May 2005 Quarter-final	Tipperary	0-19 - 1-12	Limerick	Semple Stadium
	P Lawlor 0-9, R O'Brien 0-4, S Stapleton 0-2, W Keogh 0-1, S Everard 0-1, T Slevin 0-1, S Sweeney 0-1.		M Keane 1-8, M Bodie 0-3, G O'Leary 0-1.	Referee: A Heagney (Clare)

=== Munster semi-finals ===
22 May 2005 Semi-final	Cork	0-17 - 1-13	Waterford	Semple Stadium
	M O'Sullivan 0-8, K Canty 0-3, R O'Dwyer 0-2, J Hughes 0-2, D O'Riordan 0-1, B Coleman 0-1.		J Wall 0-6, S Molumphy 1-1, J Hartley 0-2, D Howard 0-1, P Fitzgerald 0-1, A Kirwan 0-1, S McCarthy 0-1.	Referee: J O'Mahony (Limerick)

5 June 2005 Semi-final	Tipperary	0-17 - 1-12	Clare	Gaelic Grounds
	C O'Brien 0-4, S McGrath 0-3, S Everard 0-3, P Lawlor 0-3, S Stapleton 0-2, W Keogh 0-1, T Connors 0-1.		P Vaughan 0-4, C Egan 1-0, C Earlie 0-3, B McMahon 0-2, H Hayes 0-1, A O'Brien 0-1, F Lynch 0-1.	Referee: M Wadding (Waterford)

=== Munster final ===
20 July 2005 Final	Tipperary	2-11 - 2-17	Cork	Semple Stadium
	R O'Brien 1-1, A Fitzgerald 1-1 P Lawlor 0-4, S Stapleton 0-2, S Everard 0-1, T Slevin 0-1, S McGrath 0-1.		M O'Sullivan 0-10, S Dinneen 1-2, K Hartnett 1-0, S Kearney 0-2, K Canty 0-1, K Morrisson 0-1, J Hughes 0-1.

== All-Ireland Intermediate Hurling Championship ==
=== All-Ireland semi-final ===
6 August 2005 Semi-final	Galway	1-15 - 0-14	Cork	Semple Stadium
	K Burke 0-8, T Kavanagh 1-0, B Gantley 0-2, E Ryan 0-2, N Kelly 0-1, K Hoban 0-1, B Lawless 0-1.		M O'Sullivan 0-7, K Morrisson 0-2, K Hartnett 0-2, J Murphy 0-1, K Canty 0-1, J Hughes 0-1.	Referee: J Guinan (Kilkenny)

=== All-Ireland final ===
3 September 2005 Final	Wexford	1-15 - 0-16	Galway	O'Moore Park
	S Doyle 0-7, P Roche 1-0, MJ Furlong 0-3, PJ Carley 0-2, L Gleeson 0-1, PJ Nolan 0-1, M Kelly 0-1.		K Burke 0-9, B Lucas 0-3, N Kenny 0-1, J Gantley 0-1, B Gantley 0-1, N Earls 0-1.	Referee: M Wadding (Waterford)

== Championship statistics ==
=== Top scorers ===
Top scorers overall

Rank	Player	County	Tally	Total	Matches	Average
1	Maurice O'Sullivan	Cork	0-25	25	3	8.33
2	Kenneth Burke	Galway	0-17	17	2	8.50
3	Pat Lawlor	Tipperary	0-16	16	3	5.33
4	Mark Keane	Limerick	1-08	11	1	11.00
4	Stephen Doyle	Wexford	0-11	11	2	5.50

In a single game

Rank	Player	County	Tally	Total	Opposition
1	Mark Keane	Limerick	1-08	11	Tipperary
2	Maurice O'Sullivan	Cork	0-10	10	Tipperary
3	Pat Lawlor	Tipperary	0-09	9	Limerick
3	Kenneth Burke	Galway	0-09	9	Wexford
5	Maurice O'Sullivan	Cork	0-08	8	Waterford
5	Kenneth Burke	Galway	0-08	8	Cork
7	Maurice O'Sullivan	Cork	0-07	7	Wexford
7	Stephen Doyle	Wexford	0-07	7	Galway
9	John Wall	Waterford	0-06	6	Cork
10	Stephen Dineen	Cork	1-02	5	Tipperary
10	Stephen Nolan	Wexford	0-05	5	Kilenny
