= 2007 All-Ireland Intermediate Hurling Championship =

Championship Details
- Dates: 27 May – 25 August 2007
- Teams: 9

All Ireland Champions
- Winners: Wexford (4th win)
- Captain: John O'Connor
- Manager: John Meyler

All Ireland Runners-up
- Runners-up: Waterford
- Captain: Shane Kearney
- Manager: Michael Walsh

Provincial Champions
- Munster: Waterford
- Leinster: Wexford
- Ulster: Not Played
- Connacht: Not Played

Championship Statistics
- Matches Played: 8
- Total Goals: 20 (2.50 per game)
- Total Points: 193 (.12 per game)
- Top Scorer: Shane Casey (5-13)

The 2007 All-Ireland Intermediate Hurling Championship was the 24th staging of the All-Ireland Intermediate Hurling Championship since its establishment by the Gaelic Athletic Association in 1961. The championship began on 27 May 2007 and ended on 25 August 2007.

Cork entered the championship as the defending champions, however, they were beaten by Clare in the Munster quarter-final.

The All-Ireland final was played on 25 August 2007 at Nowlan Park in Kilkenny, between Wexford and Waterford, in what was their first ever meeting in the final. Wexford won the match by 1-11 to 1-09 to claim their fourth championship title overall and a first title since 2005.

Waterford's Shane Casey was the championship's top scorer with 5-13.

== Team summaries ==
Team	Colours	Most recent success	
Team	Colours	All-Ireland	Provincial
Clare	Saffron and blue		
Cork	Red and white	2006	2006
Dublin	Blue and navy		1972
Galway	Maroon and white	2002	1998
Kilkenny	Black and amber	1973	2006
Limerick	Green and white	1998	1998
Tipperary	Blue and gold	2000	2002
Waterford	White and blue		
Wexford	Purple and gold	2005	2005

== Leinster Intermediate Hurling Championship ==
=== Leinster semi-final ===
27 June 2007 Semi-final	Dublin	0-10 - 0-14	Kilkenny	Parnell Park
	A McCrabbe 0-5, S O'Connor 0-3, D Russell 0-1, G Bennett 0-1.		R Hogan 0-10, M Phelan 0-1, B Beckett 0-1, P Hogan 0-1, D Butler 0-1.

=== Leinster final ===
11 July 2007 Final	Kilkenny	1-12 - 2-11	Wexford	Nowlan Park
	R Hogan 0-9, N Doherty 1-2, P Hogan 0-1.		P Doran 1-6, E Martin 1-1, N Kirwan 0-2, D Redmond 0-1, S Banville 0-1, C O'Connor 0-1.

== Munster Intermediate Hurling Championship ==
=== Munster quarter-final ===
27 May 2007 Quarter-final	Clare	0-12 - 1-06	Cork	Semple Stadium
	M O'Flaherty 0-8, C Lafferty 0-1, P Keyes 0-1, C McMahon 0-1, A Fleming 0-1.		S O'Sullivan 1-1, L Desmond 0-2, J Halbert 0-1, T Murray 0-1, J Horgan 0-1.

=== Munster semi-finals ===
10 June 2007 Semi-final	Limerick	0-17 - 0-15	Tipperary	Gaelic Grounds
	A O'Connor 0-9, P Storan 0-4, L O'Dwyer 0-1, D O'Brien 0-1, R McKeogh 0-1, R O'Neill 0-1.		R O'Brien 0-10, G Ryan 0-2, T Ruth 0-1, D O'Brien 0-1, A Fitzgerald 0-1.

17 June 2007 Semi-final	Waterford	2-17 - 1-13	Clare	Semple Stadium
	S Barron 0-6, N Jacob 1-1, P Fitzgerald 0-3, S Casey 1-0, E Bennett and W Hutchinson 0-2 each, D Howard, C Carey, M Molumphy 0-1 each		M Hawes 1-0, C Lafferty, C McMahon, C Hassett and D Kennedy 0-2 each, M Flaherty, P Keyes, A Flemming, B McNamara, G Arthur 0-1 each

=== Munster final ===
18 July 2007 Final	Waterford	5-11 - 1-12	Limerick	Semple Stadium
	S Casey 3-5, S Barron 1-1, C Carey 1-0, G Power 0-2, M Molumphy, E Bennett, P Fitzgerald 0-1 each.	Report	A O'Connor 0-7, P Storan 1-0, R O'Neill 0-2, A Brennan, R McKeogh, D Sullivan 0-1 each.	Referee: J Healy (Clare)

== All-Ireland Intermediate Hurling Championship ==
=== All-Ireland semi-final ===
11 August 2007 Semi-final	Waterford	3-17 - 2-06	Galway	Semple Stadium
	S Casey 1-5 (0-4 frees); P Kearney 1-3; C Carey 1-2; P Fitzgerald 0-4 (0-1 free); S Barron 0-2; G Power 0-1.	Report	M Greaney 2-0; B Lawless 0-3; E Hyland (free), T Tierney, M Lydon 0-1.	Referee: D Richardson (Limerick)

=== All-Ireland final ===
25 August 2007 Final	Wexford	1-11 - 1-09	Waterford	Nowlan Park
	P Doran 0-6, C Lyng 1-0, J Breen 0-2, R Barry 0-1, D Redmond 0-1, J Roche 0-1.	Report	C Carey 1-0, S Casey 0-3, M Molumphy 0-1, N Jacob 0-1, D Power 0-1, G Power 0-1, P Fitzgerald 0-1, S Barron 0-1.	Referee: E Morris (Dublin)

== Championship statistics ==
=== Top scorers ===
Top scorers overall

Rank	Player	County	Tally	Total	Matches	Average
1	Shane Casey	Waterford	5-13	28	4	7.00
2	Richie Hogan	Kilkenny	0-19	19	2	9.50
3	Alan O'Connor	Limerick	0-16	16	2	8.00
4	Pat Doran	Wexford	1-12	15	2	7.50
5	Stephen Barron	Waterford	1-10	13	4	3.25

Top scorers in a single game

Rank	Player	County	Tally	Total	Opposition
1	Shane Casey	Waterford	3-05	14	Limerick
2	Richie Hogan	Kilkenny	0-10	10	Dublin
2	Ronan O'Brien	Tipperary	0-10	10	Limerick
4	Pat Doran	Wexford	1-06	9	Kilkenny
4	Richie Hogan	Kilkenny	0-09	9	Wexford
4	Alan O'Connor	Limerick	0-09	9	Tipperary
7	Shane Casey	Waterford	1-05	8	Galway
7	Mark O'Flaherty	Clare	0-08	8	Cork
9	Alan O'Connor	Limerick	0-07	7	Waterford
9	Michael Greaney	Galway	2-00	6	Waterford
9	Patrick Kearney	Waterford	1-03	6	Galway
9	Stephen Barron	Waterford	0-06	6	Clare
9	Pat Doran	Wexford	0-06	6	Waterford

=== Miscellaneous ===
- Waterford won the Munster title for the first time in their history.
