= 2008 All-Ireland Intermediate Hurling Championship =

Championship Details
- Dates: 31 May – 30 August 2008
- Teams: 9

All Ireland Champions
- Winners: Kilkenny (2nd win)
- Captain: Conor Phelan
- Manager: Pat Hoban

All Ireland Runners-up
- Runners-up: Limerick
- Captain: Alan O'Connor
- Manager: Jerry Molyneaux

Provincial Champions
- Munster: Limerick
- Leinster: Kilkenny
- Ulster: Not Played
- Connacht: Not Played

Championship Statistics
- Matches Played: 8
- Total Goals: 27 (3.375 per game)
- Total Points: 252 (31.5 per game)
- Top Scorer: Paddy Hogan (6-15)

The 2008 All-Ireland Intermediate Hurling Championship was the 25th staging of the All-Ireland Intermediate Hurling Championship since its establishment by the Gaelic Athletic Association in 1961. The championship began on 31 May 2008 and ended on 30 August 2008.

Wexford entered the championship as the defending champions, however, they were beaten by Kilkenny in the Leinster semi-final.

The All-Ireland final was played on 30 August 2008 at Semple Stadium in Thurles, between Kilkenny and Limerick, in what was their first meeting in the final in 10 years. Kilkenny won the match by 1-16 to 0-13 to claim their second championship title overall and a first title since 1973.

Kilkenny's Paddy Hogan was the championship's top scorer with 6-15.

== Team summaries ==
Team	Colours	Most recent success	
Team	Colours	All-Ireland	Provincial
Clare	Saffron and blue		
Cork	Red and white	2006	2006
Dublin	Blue and navy		1972
Galway	Maroon and white	2002	1998
Kilkenny	Black and amber	1973	2006
Limerick	Green and white	1998	1998
Tipperary	Blue and gold	2000	2002
Waterford	White and blue		2007
Wexford	Purple and gold	2007	2007

== Leinster Intermediate Hurling Championship ==
=== Leinster semi-final ===
28 June 2008 Semi-final	Wexford	0-12 - 1-19	Kilkenny	Wexford Park
	J Berry (0-7), D Nolan (0-2), J Dwyer (0-1), S O’Neill (0-1), P Atkinson (0-1).		C Dunne (1-4), K Joyce (0-4) (4f), P Cleere (0-3), P Lonergan (0-2); P Hogan (0-2), E Hennebry (0-2), A Healy (0-1), J Nolan (0-1).

=== Leinster final ===
2 August 2008 Final	Kilkenny	4-26 - 3-15 (aet)	Dublin	Nowlan Park
	N Doherty 2-4, P Hogan 1-3, M Grace 0-6, P Cleere 1-2, B Beckett 0-3, C Dunne 0-3, K Joyce 0-2, P Hartley 0-1, J Nolan 0-1, N Walsh 0-1.		D Treacy 0-8, S Martin 2-1, A Nolan 1-0, D Russell 0-2, T Sweeney 0-1, P Brennan 0-1, E Carroll 0-1, D Sweeney 0-1.

== Munster Intermediate Hurling Championship ==
=== Munster quarter-final ===
1 June 2008 Quarter-final	Clare	2-12 - 2-16	Waterford	Gaelic Grounds
	S Chaplin 0-8f, P Chaplin 1-4, G Lyons, C Earley, N Sheedy and P Hickey 0-1 each.	Report	M Gorman 0-8 (7f, 1 '65), P Murray, P Fitzgerald, S Barron and L Lawlor 0-2 each, JJ Hutchinson and G O'Connor 0-1 each.	Referee: D O'Driscoll (Limerick)

=== Munster semi-finals ===
8 June 2008 Semi-final	Cork	0-17 - 1-21	Tipperary	Páirc Uí Chaoimh
	A Mannix (0-5, 0-4 frees); L Desmond (0-4); P O'Brien (0-3), J O'Callaghan (0-2), J O'Leary (0-2), JP Murphy (0-1).	Report	J Ryan (1-4, 0-4 frees, 1-0 penalty), C Dillon (0-6), G Ryan (0-3), T Minogue (0-2), D Morrissey (0-2), R O'Meara (0-1), P Maher (0-1), E Hanley (0-1), M Harding (0-1).	Referee: P Casey (Waterford)

22 June 2008 Semi-final	Limerick	1-16 - 0-15	Clare	Semple Stadium
	David Moloney (1-2), P McNamara (0-4), D O'Neill (0-3), A Brennan (0-2), R McCarthy (0-2), D Hanley (0-1), A O'Connor (0-1), P Harty (0-1).	Report	S Chaplin (0-5), P Hickey (0-4), D Browne (0-2), A McNamara (0-1), G Lyons (0-1), N Sheedy (0-1), Clive Early (0-1).	Referee: T Ryan (Tipperary)

=== Munster final ===
31 July 2008 Final	Tipperary	2-12 - 2-16	Limerick	Semple Stadium
	N Hogan 2-5, T Minogue 0-2, M Harding 0-2, JB McCarthy 0-1, C Dillon 0-1, A Fitzgerald 0-1.	Report	D O’Connor 0-6, D O’Neill 1-1, P McNamara 1-1, A O’Connor 0-4, David Moloney 0-2, P O’Reilly 0-1, A Brennan 0-1.	Referee: P Casey (Waterford)

== All-Ireland Intermediate Hurling Championship ==
=== All-Ireland semi-final ===
9 August 2008 Semi-final	Kilkenny	5-14 - 3-12 (aet)	Galway	O'Connor Park
	P Hogan 4-4, N Doherty 1-1, E Heneberry 0-4, M Grace 0-3, K Joyce 0-1, P Cleere 0-1.	Report	E Hyland 2-1, N Carr 0-6, N Kenny 1-0, T Flannery 0-2, M Kelly 0-1, D McEvoy 0-1, K Huban 0-1.	Referee: A Stapleton (Laois)

=== All-Ireland final ===
30 August 2008 Final	Limerick	0-13 - 1-16	Kilkenny	Semple Stadium
	A O’Connor (0-6, 4f, 2 65’), P McNamara (0-3), M Keane (0-1, 1f), P O’Reilly (0-1), D O’Neill (0-1), A Brennan (0-1).	Report	P Hogan (1-6, 5f), N Doherty (0-3), D Fogarty (0-2, 1f), B Beckett (0-2), M Grace (0-2), K Joyce (0-1, 1f).	Referee: J McGrath (Westmeath)

== Championship statistics ==
=== Top scorers ===
Top scorers overall

Rank	Player	County	Tally	Total	Matches	Average
1	Paddy Hogan	Kilkenny	6-15	33	4	8.25
2	Noel Doherty	Kilkenny	3-08	17	4	4.25
3	Seán Chaplin	Clare	0-13	13	2	6.50
4	Noel Hogan	Tipperary	2-05	11	2	5.50
4	Paudie McNamara	Limerick	1-08	11	3	3.66
4	Alan O'Connor	Limerick	0-11	11	3	3.66
4	Michael Grace	Kilkenny	0-11	11	3	3.66

Top scorers in a single game

Rank	Player	Club	Tally	Total	Opposition
1	Paddy Hogan	Kilkenny	4-04	16	Galway
2	Noel Hogan	Tipperary	2-05	11	Limerick
3	Noel Doherty	Kilkenny	2-04	10	Dublin
4	Paddy Hogan	Kilkenny	1-06	9	Limerick
5	David Treacy	Dublin	0-08	8	Kilkenny
5	Seán Chaplin	Clare	0-08	8	Waterford
5	Mark Gorman	Waterford	0-08	8	Clare
8	Shane Martin	Dublin	2-01	7	Kilkenny
8	Eamon Hyland	Galway	2-01	7	Kilkenny
8	Cathal Dunne	Kilkenny	1-04	7	Wexford
8	Pádraig Chaplin	Clare	1-04	7	Waterford
8	Jody Ryan	Tipperary	1-04	7	Cork
8	Jim Berry	Wexford	0-07	7	Kilkenny
