= Anthony Nash (hurler) =

Cork hurler (born 1984)

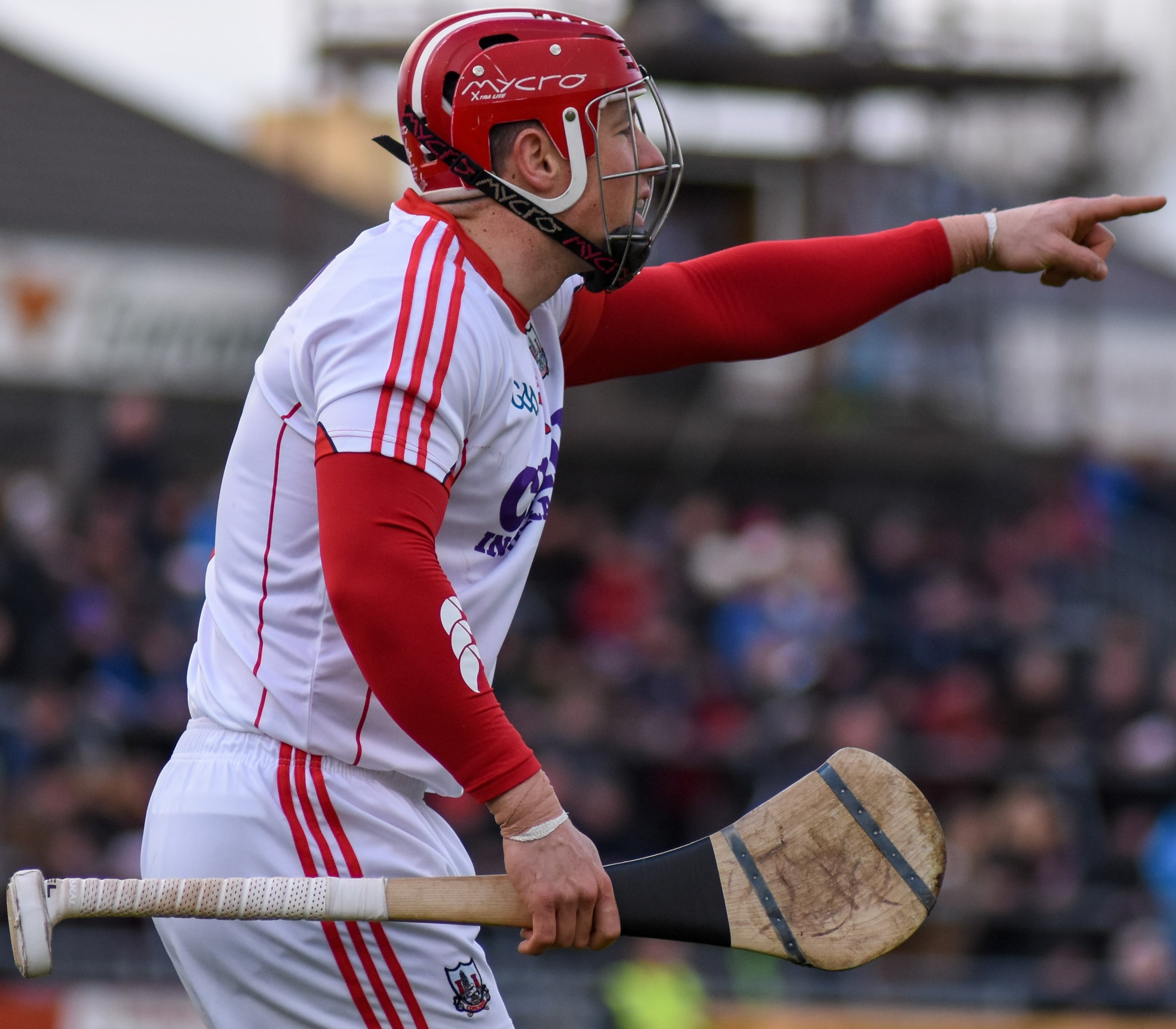

Personal information
- Native name: Antóin de Nais (Irish)
- Nickname: Nasher
- Born: 12 October 1984 (age 42) Kanturk, County Cork, Ireland
- Occupation: Secondary school teacher
- Height: 5 ft 10 in (178 cm)

Sport
- Sport: Hurling
- Position: Goalkeeper
Clubs*
Years	Club	Apps (scores)
2001-2020 2001-2005 2006-2007 2008-2009 2010-2017 2021-2022	Kanturk → Duhallow → Cork IT → UCC → Duhallow; South Liberties	6 (0-03); 6 (0-00); 6 (1-00); 6 (1-01); 18 (2-12); 10 (0-15)
Club titles
	Football	Hurling
Cork titles	0	0
College
- Years: College
- University College Cork
College titles
- Fitzgibbon titles: 1
Inter-county**
Years	County	Apps (scores)
2005–2020	Cork	43 (3–12)
Inter-county titles
- Munster titles: 4
- All-Irelands: 0
- NHL: 0
- All Stars: 2
- * club appearances and scores correct as of 22:29, 5 October 2021. **Inter County team apps and scores correct as of 18:52, 14 November 2020.

Anthony Nash (born 12 October 1984) is a retired Irish hurler who played for the Kanturk and Limerick Championship Club South Liberties clubs. He played for the Cork senior hurling team for 15 seasons, during which time he lined out as a goalkeeper.

Nash began his hurling career at club level with Kanturk. He broke onto the club's top adult team as a 16-year-old in 2001 and, after winning Intermediate and Premier Intermediate championship titles, he enjoyed his greatest success in 2018 when he claimed an All-Ireland Club Championship winners' medal in the intermediate grade. Nash's prowess also saw him being selected for divisional side Duhallow, Cork Institute of Technology and University College Cork, with whom he won a Fitzgibbon Cup medal in 2009.

At inter-county level, Nash was part of the successful Cork minor team that won the All-Ireland Minor Championship in 2001 before later winning a record four All-Ireland Intermediate Championships with the intermediate team in 2003, 2004, 2006 and 2009. He joined the Cork senior team in 2005. Nash eventually succeeded Donal Óg Cusack as first-choice goalkeeper and made a combined total of 91 National League and Championship appearances in a career that ended with his last game in 2020. During that time he was part of four Munster Championship-winning teams – in 2006, 2014, 2017 and 2018. Nash was an All-Ireland Championship runner-up on two occasions. He announced his retirement from inter-county hurling on 6 December 2020.

Nash won his first All-Star in 2012. He claimed a second successive accolade in 2013, the same year he was also nominated for Hurler of the Year. At inter-provincial level, Nash was selected to play in several championship campaigns with Munster, with his sole Railway Cup medal being won in 2013.

Nash transferred to Limerick club South Liberties in 2021. In October 2022, he announced his retirement from club hurling after South Liberties were beaten in the 2022 Limerick Senior Hurling Championship semi-final by Na Piarsaigh.

== Early life ==
Nash was born in Kanturk, County Cork. His uncles, Declan and Mike Nash won Munster medals with Limerick. In 2000 Nash had a trial as a goalkeeper with then Premier League side Wimbledon F.C.

== Playing career ==
=== University ===
On 7 March 2009, Nash was in goal for the University College Cork team that faced the University of Limerick in the final of the Fitzgibbon Cup. A 2–17 to 0–14 victory gave him his sole Fitzgibbon Cup medal.

=== Club ===
Nash joined the Kanturk club at a young age and played in all grades at juvenile and underage levels as a dual player. In 2002 he was in goal in the final as Kanturk defeated Meelin by 2–14 to 1–12 to take the Duhallow JAHC title. Nash won a second divisional championship medal in 2003 when Kanturk retained the title after a defeat of Freemount after a replay.

In 2009 Nash was an outfield player with the Kanturk junior football team that defeated Rockchapel to win the Duhallow JAFC title. He won a second divisional title in 2011 after another defeat of Rockchapel in the final. On 11 November 2011, Nash won a county junior championship medal following a 1–20 to 0–04 defeat of Mitchelstown in the final. He ended the game as man of the match.

On 3 November 2013, Nash was in goal when the Kanturk hurlers faced Éire Óg in the final of the county intermediate championship. He scored a point from a free in the 2–22 to 1–12 victory.

The 2017–18 season proved to be a hugely successful one for Nash and the Kanturk club. After claiming a premier intermediate championship medal following a two-point defeat of Mallow in the final, he later won a Munster medal after a 1–23 to 0-25 extra time defeat of Kilmaley. On 4 February 2018, Nash won an All-Ireland medal after scoring two points from long-range frees in a 1–18 to 1–17 defeat of St Patrick's Ballyragget in the final.

He subsequently joined Limerick club South Liberties in 2020. He announced his retirement following the 2022 Limerick Senior Hurling Championship semi-final.

=== Inter-county ===
==== Minor and under-21 ====
Nash was just sixteen years old when he joined the Cork minor hurling team in 2001 as sub goalkeeper to Martin Coleman. In spite of losing out to Tipperary in the Munster final, Cork later claimed the All-Ireland title following a 2–10 to 1–08 defeat of Galway. Nash was a non-playing substitute for the entire championship, however, he was still presented with an All-Ireland winners' medal. He was sub goalkeeper once again in 2002, however, Cork's championship campaign ended with a defeat to Galway.

Nash subsequently joined the Cork under-21 team in 2003. After spending two seasons as sub goalkeeper he made his first appearance for the team on 8 June 2005 in a Munster Championship quarter-final defeat of Waterford. On 3 August 2005, Nash won a Munster medal after a 4–08 to 0–13 defeat of Tipperary in the final.

==== Intermediate ====
Nash was selected for the Cork intermediate team in 2003. As goalkeeping understudy to Martin Coleman, he won a set of Munster and All-Ireland medals following defeats of Waterford and Kilkenny.

Due to his non-playing role in 2003, Nash was eligible to line out as first-choice goalkeeper the following season. After making his debut on 30 May 2004, he later won his second Munster medal, his first on the field of play, after an 0–18 to 1–09 defeat of Tipperary in the final. On 4 September 2004, Nash won a second successive All-Ireland medal after a 1–16 to 1–10 defeat of Kilkenny in a replay of the final.

After being ineligible for the team in 2005, Nash was back in goal the following season and won a third Munster medal after a five-point defeat of Tipperary in the final. On 26 August 2006, Nash won a third All-Ireland medal after a 3–15 to 1–18 defeat of Kilkenny in the final.

Nash won his fourth Munster medal in 2009 after a 5–24 to 3–09 defeat of Waterford. On 29 August 2009, he won a record fourth All-Ireland medal after a 2–23 to 0–16 defeat of Kilkenny.

==== Senior ====
Nash joined the Cork senior hurling team for the first time in 2005. He was a non-playing substitute on Cork's Oireachtas Cup-winning team on 31 October 2005.

On 12 March 2006, Nash made his National League debut in a 3–25 to 0–09 defeat of Down at Páirc Uí Rinn. Regular goalkeeper Donal Óg Cusack remained as Cork's first-choice goalkeeper for the championship, however, Nash won his first Munster medal as a non-playing substitute following Cork's three-point defeat of Tipperary in the final.

As a result of Donal Óg Cusack's suspension, Nash made his championship debut as goalkeeper in a Munster semi-final against Waterford on 17 June 2007. Cork conceded five goals, however, Nash was praised for his display after his side lost by only three points. He later described the game as a "blur".

On 22 April 2012, Nash was introduced as a substitute against Tipperary in the National League semi-final after Donal Óg Cusack ruptured his Achilles tendon. He scored a point from a free in that game, however, he was left out of the starting fifteen in favour of Martin Coleman for Cork's subsequent league final defeat by Kilkenny. Nash became Cork's first-choice goalkeeper for the subsequent championship. On 14 July 2012, Nash scored his first championship goal from a penalty in an All-Ireland quarter-final defeat of Wexford. He finished the year by claiming his first All-Star award.

On 8 September 2013, Nash lined out in his first All-Ireland final against Clare having earlier lost the Munster final to Limerick. After two of his frees were saved, Nash scored a second-half goal from a close-in free. Conor Lehane and Pa Cronin also scored second-half goals while Patrick Horgan's tenth point of the game gave Cork a one-point lead as injury time came to an end. A last-second point from corner-back Domhnall O'Donovan earned Clare a 0–25 to 3–16 draw. The replay on 28 September 2013 also saw Nash score a goal, however, a hat-trick by Clare's Shane O'Donnell and further goals from Conor McGrath and Darach Honan secured a 5–16 to 3–16 victory for Clare. Nash ended the season with a second consecutive All-Star award. He was also nominated for Hurler of the Year.

On 13 July 2014, Nash won his second Munster medal and his first on the field of play after a six-point defeat of Limerick in the final.

Nash was appointed captain of the Cork senior hurling team for the 2015 season. On 9 February 2015, a Twitter Q&A session with Nash was hijacked by his Cork teammates Luke O'Farrell, Paudie O'Sullivan and Luke O'Farrell.

On 9 July 2017, Nash won his third Munster medal following a 1–25 to 1–20 defeat of Clare in the final. After the game footage emerged of a man in a Clare training top taking Nash's bag of sliotars from behind the Cork goal and throwing it into the terrace. Clare later issued a formal apology to the Cork County Board. Nash ended the season with his third All-Star nomination, however, he lost out to Waterford's Stephen O'Keeffe.

On 1 July 2018, Nash won a fourth Munster medal following a 2–24 to 3-19 second successive defeat of Clare in the final. He ended the season by being nominated for an All-Star Award.

On 6 December 2020, Nash announced his retirement from inter-county hurling.

=== Inter-provincial ===
Nash made his debut as goalkeeper with the Munster inter-provincial team on 15 October 2006 in a 2–17 to 1–16 defeat by Connacht in the Railway Cup semi-final. On 3 March 2013, Nash won a Railway Cup medal after a 1–22 to 0–15 defeat of Connacht in the final.

Nash was also included on the Munster team for the 2014 and 2016 Railway Cup campaigns.

== Style of play ==
Although regularly lining out as a goalkeeper, Nash has also been noted as a long-range free-taker and as a penalty taker. His technique for the latter — right hand on top but striking left handed — required such a high throw that it carried six or seven metres ahead of him. Using his run-in and stroke to achieve maximum velocity, Nash was only about 13 metres from the goal when he connected with the sliotar. His penalty technique was first highlighted when he scored in Cork's All-Ireland quarter-final defeat of Wexford in 2012. Commentator Ger Canning noticed how far Nash had lifted the ball, saying that it looked like the strike was closer to being 15 metres from goal as opposed to the regulation 20 metres. Nash's technique gained more prominence when he scored goals from close-in frees in each of the drawn and replayed All-Ireland finals in 2013, in spite of being charged down by Clare goalkeeper Patrick Kelly. His advancing penalties subsequently became a major talking point. The dangerous nature of it was being discussed by former goalkeepers such as Ger Cunningham and Davy Fitzgerald, while techniques to stop it were also being discussed. Other players, such as Kilkenny's T. J. Reid, also developed their own Nash-style penalty. The issue was raised again following Stephen O'Keeffe's charging down of a Nash penalty in the Munster quarter-final replay against Waterford in 2014. O'Keeffe's save with his thigh sparked a further debate regarding the safety of the penalty technique and the role of the defending goalkeeper. The GAA's Management Committee quickly clarified the rules in relation to penalties and 20-metre frees insisting that shots should be taken from the full 20 metres out with no rushing the ball from defenders. This clarification was immediately dubbed the "Nash Rule". The rule was later changed again with one-on-one penalties being implemented in 2015.

== Career statistics ==
=== Club ===
As of 3 October 2021.

Team	Year	Cork JAHC		Munster		All-Ireland		Total	
Team	Year	Apps	Score	Apps	Score	Apps	Score	Apps	Score
Kanturk	2001	—		—		—		—	
Kanturk	2002	1	0-00	—		—		1	0-00
Kanturk	2003	1	0-02	—		—		1	0-02
Kanturk	Total	2	0-02	—		—		2	0-02
Kanturk	Year	Cork IHC		Munster		All-Ireland		Total	
Kanturk	Year	Apps	Score	Apps	Score	Apps	Score	Apps	Score
Kanturk	2004	2	0-01	—		—		2	0-01
Kanturk	2005	2	0-02	—		—		2	0-02
Kanturk	2006	2	2-01	—		—		2	2-01
Kanturk	2007	3	1-01	—		—		3	1-01
Kanturk	2008	3	0-01	—		—		3	0-01
Kanturk	2009	3	1-05	—		—		3	1-05
Kanturk	2010	2	1-02	—		—		2	1-02
Kanturk	2011	3	0-01	—		—		3	0-01
Kanturk	2012	6	3-01	—		—		6	3-01
Kanturk	2013	5	2-04	—		—		5	2-04
Kanturk	Total	31	10-19	—		—		31	10-19
Kanturk	Year	Cork PIHC		Munster		All-Ireland		Total	
Kanturk	Year	Apps	Score	Apps	Score	Apps	Score	Apps	Score
Kanturk	2014	4	0-03	—		—		4	0-03
Kanturk	2015	5	0-07	—		—		5	0-07
Kanturk	2016	3	0-00	—		—		3	0-00
Kanturk	2017	5	0-05	3	0-00	3	1-03	11	1-08
Kanturk	Total	17	0-15	3	0-00	3	1-03	23	1-18
Kanturk	Year	Cork SHC		Munster		All-Ireland		Total	
Kanturk	Year	Apps	Score	Apps	Score	Apps	Score	Apps	Score
Kanturk	2018	3	0-00	—		—		3	0-00
Kanturk	2019	3	0-03	—		—		3	0-03
Kanturk	Total	6	0-03	—		—		6	0-03
Kanturk	Year	Cork SAHC		Munster		All-Ireland		Total	
Kanturk	Year	Apps	Score	Apps	Score	Apps	Score	Apps	Score
Kanturk	2020	5	1-04	—		—		5	1-04
Kanturk	Total	5	1-04	—		—		5	1-04
Career total		61	11-43	3	0-00	3	1-03	67	12-46
	Year	Limerick SHC		Munster		All-Ireland		Total	
	Year	Apps	Score	Apps	Score	Apps	Score	Apps	Score
South Liberties	2021	3	0-07	—		—		3	0-07
South Liberties	2022	7	0-08	—		—		7	0-08
South Liberties	Total	10	0-15	—		—		10	0-15
Career total		71	11-58	3	0-00	3	1-03	77	12-61

=== Division/colleges ===
Team	Year	Cork SHC	
Team	Year	Apps	Score
Duhallow	2001	0	0-00
Duhallow	2002	1	0-00
Duhallow	2003	1	0-00
Duhallow	2004	1	0-00
Duhallow	2005	3	0-00
Cork Institute of Technology	2006	4	1-00
Cork Institute of Technology	2007	2	0-00
University College Cork	2008	4	1-01
University College Cork	2009	2	0-00
Duhallow	2010	1	1-00
Duhallow	2011	3	1-02
Duhallow	2012	1	0-00
Duhallow	2013	2	0-01
Duhallow	2014	1	0-03
Duhallow	2015	3	0-03
Duhallow	2016	3	0-00
Duhallow	2017	4	0-03
Total		37	4-13

=== Inter-county ===
Team	Year	National League			Munster		All-Ireland		Total	
Team	Year	Division	Apps	Score	Apps	Score	Apps	Score	Apps	Score
Cork	2006	Division 1A	1	0-00	0	0-00	0	0-00	1	0-00
Cork	2007	Division 1A	1	0-00	1	0-00	0	0-00	2	0-00
Cork	2008	Division 1A	2	0-00	0	0-00	0	0-00	2	0-00
Cork	2009	Division 1	0	0-00	0	0-00	0	0-00	0	0-00
Cork	2010	Division 1	2	0-00	0	0-00	0	0-00	2	0-00
Cork	2011	Division 1	2	0-00	0	0-00	0	0-00	2	0-00
Cork	2012	Division 1A	1	0-01	1	0-00	4	1-04	6	1-05
Cork	2013	Division 1A	6	1-00	2	0-02	4	2-03	12	3-05
Cork	2014	Division 1B	4	1-00	4	0-01	1	0-02	9	1-03
Cork	2015	Division 1A	8	0-01	1	0-00	3	0-00	12	0-01
Cork	2016	Division 1A	4	0-01	1	0-00	2	0-00	7	0-01
Cork	2017	Division 1A	6	0-02	3	0-00	1	0-00	10	0-02
Cork	2018	Division 1A	4	0-00	5	0-00	1	0-00	10	0-00
Cork	2019	Division 1A	5	0-00	4	0-00	2	0-00	11	0-00
Cork	2020	Division 1A	2	0-00	1	0-00	2	0-00	5	0-00
Career total			48	2-05	23	0-03	20	3-09	91	5-17

=== Inter-provincial ===
Team	Year	Railway Cup	
Team	Year	Apps	Score
Munster	2006	1	0-00
Munster	2007	—	
Munster	2008	—	
Munster	2009	—	
Munster	2010	—	
Munster	2011	—	
Munster	2012	—	
Munster	2013	2	0-01
Munster	2014	1	0-02
Munster	2015	—	
Munster	2016	1	0-00
Total		5	0-03

== Honours ==
=== Player ===
University College Cork

- Fitzgibbon Cup (1): 2009

Kanturk

- All-Ireland Intermediate Club Hurling Championship (1): 2018
- Munster Intermediate Club Hurling Championship (1): 2017
- Cork Premier Intermediate Hurling Championship (1): 2017
- Cork Intermediate Hurling Championship (1): 2013 (c)
- Cork Junior Football Championship (1): 2011

Cork

- Munster Senior Hurling Championship (4): 2006, 2014, 2017, 2018
- Oireachtas Cup (1): 2005
- Munster Under-21 Hurling Championship (1): 2005
- All-Ireland Minor Hurling Championship (1): 2001
- All-Ireland Intermediate Hurling Championship (4): 2003, 2004, 2006, 2009
- Munster Intermediate Hurling Championship (4): 2003, 2004, 2006, 2009

Munster

- Railway Cup (1): 2013

Honours

- All Stars (2): 2012, 2013

=== Management ===
University of Limerick

- Fitzgibbon Cup: 2022

London

- Christy Ring Cup: 2025

Sporting positions
Preceded by Pa Cronin	Cork Senior Hurling Captain; 2015	Succeeded by Stephen McDonnell
