= 2009 All-Ireland Intermediate Hurling Championship =

Championship Details
- Dates: 31 May 2009 – 29 August 2009
- Teams: 9

All Ireland Champions
- Winners: Cork (7th win)
- Captain: Dara McSweeney
- Manager: Johnny Keane

All Ireland Runners-up
- Runners-up: Kilkenny
- Manager: Pat Hoban

Provincial Champions
- Munster: Cork
- Leinster: Kilkenny
- Ulster: Not Played
- Connacht: Not Played

Championship Statistics
- Matches Played: 8
- Total Goals: 25 (3.125 per game)
- Total Points: 235 (29.5 per game)
- Top Scorer: Leigh Desmond (1-23)

The 2009 All-Ireland Intermediate Hurling Championship was the 26th staging of the All-Ireland hurling championship. It started on 31 May 2015 and ended on 29 August 2009.

Kilkenny were the defending champions, however, they were defeated in the final by Cork who won the title by 2-23 to 0-16.

== Team summaries ==
Team	Colours	Most recent success	
Team	Colours	All-Ireland	Provincial
Clare	Saffron and blue		
Cork	Red and white	2006	2006
Dublin	Blue and navy		1972
Galway	Maroon and white	2002	2008
Kilkenny	Black and amber	2008	2008
Limerick	Green and white	1999	2008
Tipperary	Blue and gold	2000	2002
Waterford	White and blue		2007
Wexford	Purple and gold	2007	2007

== Leinster Intermediate Hurling Championship ==
=== Leinster semi-final ===
24 June 2009 Semi-final	Kilkenny	1-13 - 0-13	Dublin	Nowlan Park
	B Lannon, JJ Farrell, P Murphy 0-3 each, C Dunne 1-0, E Guinan 0-2 (2f), E Brennan, E Hickey 0-1 each.	Report	P Garbutt 0-7 (3f), R O’Carroll 0-3, P O’Driscoll, B O’Rorke, M May 0-1each.	Referee: A Stapleton (Laois)

=== Leinster final ===
19 July 2009 Final	Kilkenny	0-12 - 0-11	Wexford	Nowlan Park
	E Guinan (0-8, four frees, two 65s), JJ Farrell (0-2), M Boran (0-1), B Lannon (0-1).	Report	J Gahan (0-4, two frees), J Lawlor (0-4, one free), G Jacob (0-1), E Moore (0-1), P Nolan (0-1).	Referee: F Smith (Meath)

== Munster Intermediate Hurling Championship ==
=== Munster quarter-final ===
31 May 2009 Quarter-final	Tipperary	2-06 - 1-24	Cork	Semple Stadium
	T Dalton 1-1, F Horgan 1-0, W O'Dwyer, M Dunne, A Ryan, D Stapleton, J Ryan (f) 0-1 each.	Report	B Ring 0-7 (0-3f), Maurice O'Sullivan 1-2, R Dwyer 0-4, J Carey, S Moylan 0-3 each, B Coleman 0-2, J O'Leary (f), E Collins, M Collins 0-1 each,	Referee: D Richardson (Limerick)

=== Munster semi-finals ===
14 June 2009 Semi-final	Waterford	5-15 - 0-07	Limerick	Semple Stadium
	P Kearney (3-1), B Hannon (0-6f), P Hurney (1-2), J Kearney (1-1), D Murphy 0-3, P Fitzgerald and L Lawlor (0-1 each).	Report	T O’Brien (0-4; 0-2f, 0-1 ‘65), N Quaid and M Keane (0-1) and T Quaid (0-1f).	Referee: S McMahon (Clare)

21 June 2009 Semi-final	Cork	2-16 - 1-14	Clare	Gaelic Grounds
	L Farrell (1-3), Maurice O’Sullivan (1-0), B Ring (0-3, frees), A Mannix (0-2), J O’Leary (0-2, one free), B Coleman (0-2), S Moylan (0-2), R Dwyer (0-1), J Carey (0-1).	Report	C O’Donovan (1-1), N O’Connell (0-4, two frees), S Chaplin (0-4, frees), P O’Brien (0-2), B Lynch (0-1), C Earley (0-1), P Hickey (0-1).	Referee: N Cosgrove (Tipperary)

=== Munster final ===
22 July 2009 Final	Cork	5-24 - 3-09	Waterford	Páirc Uí Chaoimh
	Maurice O’Sullivan 2-3; L Desmond 1-7 (0-5 frees, 0-1 65); Mark O’Sullivan 1-2; S Moylan 0-5; L Farrell 0-3; L O’Loughlin 1-0; R Dwyer 0-1, B Ring (free), J Jordan 0-1 each.	Report	D Howard 1-1; B Hannon 0-4 (frees); J Kearney, P Hurney 1-0 each; P Fitzgerald 0-2; P, Kearney, L Lawlor 0-1 each.	Referee: N Cosgrove (Tipperary)

== All-Ireland Intermediate Hurling Championship ==
=== All-Ireland semi-final ===
8 August 2009 Semi-final	Galway	1-10 - 2-23	Cork	O'Moore Park
	T Tierney 0-6 (five frees), M Kelly (1-1), D O’Reilly (0-2), M Lydon (0-1).	Report	Mark O’Sullivan (1-5), L Farrell (1-4), L Desmond 0-5 (three frees, one 1 65), É Collins (0-2), L McLoughlan (0-2), E Dillon (0-1), B Ring (0-1), A Mannix (0-1, free), B Lawton (0-1), W Egan (0-1).	Referee: J O'Mahoney (Limerick)

=== All-Ireland final ===
29 August 2009 Final	Kilkenny	0-16 - 2-23	Cork	Fraher Field
	E Guinan 0-8 (7f), JJ Farrell, P Murphy 0-2 each, M Boran, B Lannon, N Kennedy, E Hickey 0-1 each.	Report	L Desmond 0-11 (7f), L Farrell 1-2, R Dwyer 0-4 (3f), E Collins 1-0, S Moylan 0-2, J Carey, L McLoughlin, M O'Sullivan, A Mannix 0-1 each.

== Statistics ==
=== Top scorers ===
Overall

Rank	Player	County	Tally	Total	Matches	Average
1	Leigh Desmond	Cork	1-23	26	4	6.50
2	Luke O'Farrell	Cork	3-12	21	4	5.25
3	Eoin Guinan	Kilkenny	0-18	18	3	6.00

Single game

Rank	Player	County	Tally	Total	Opposition
1	Leigh Desmond	Cork	0-11	11	Kilkenny
2	Pa Kearney	Waterford	3-1	10	Limerick
2	Leigh Desmond	Cork	1-7	10	Waterford
4	Maurice O'Sullivan	Cork	2-3	9	Waterford
5	Mark O'Sullivan	Cork	1-5	8	Galway
5	Eoin Guinan	Kilkenny	0-8	8	Cork
5	Eoin Guinan	Kilkenny	0-8	8	Wexford
8	Luke O'Farrell	Cork	1-4	7	Galway
8	Brendan Ring	Cork	0-7	7	Tipperary
8	Paul Garbutt	Dublin	0-7	7	Kilkenny
