= 2006 All-Ireland Intermediate Hurling Championship =

Championship Details
- Dates: 14 May – 26 August 2006
- Teams: 8

All Ireland Champions
- Winners: Cork (6th win)
- Captain: Darren Dineen
- Manager: Johnny Keane

All Ireland Runners-up
- Runners-up: Kilkenny
- Captain: David Carroll
- Manager: Maurice Power

Provincial Champions
- Munster: Cork
- Leinster: Kilkenny
- Ulster: Not Played
- Connacht: Not Played

Championship Statistics
- Matches Played: 7
- Total Goals: 20 (2.8 per game)
- Total Points: 197 (28.1 per game)
- Top Scorer: Eddie O'Donoghue (0-23)

The 2006 All-Ireland Intermediate Hurling Championship was the 23rd staging of the All-Ireland Intermediate Hurling Championship since its establishment by the Gaelic Athletic Association in 1961. The championship began on 14 May 2006 and ended on 26 August 2006.

Wexford entered the championship as the defending champions, however, they were beaten by Kilkenny in the Leinster final.

The All-Ireland final was played on 26 August 2006 at Fraher Field in Dungarvan, between Cork and Kilkenny, in what was their first meeting in the final in two years. Cork won the match by 3-15 to 1-18 to claim their sixth championship title overall and a first title since 2004.

Kilkenny's Eddie O'Donoghue was the championship's top scorer with 0-23.

== Team summaries ==
Team	Colours	Most recent success	
Team	Colours	All-Ireland	Provincial
Clare	Saffron and blue		
Cork	Red and white	2004	2005
Galway	Maroon and white	2002	1998
Kilkenny	Black and amber	1973	2004
Limerick	Green and white	1998	1998
Tipperary	Blue and gold	2000	2002
Waterford	White and blue		
Wexford	Purple and gold	2005	2005

== Results ==
=== Leinster Intermediate Hurling Championship ===
==== Leinster final ====
12 July 2006 Final	Wexford	0-08 - 2-20	Kilkenny	Wexford Park
	M Cleere 0-4, J Berry 0-3, O Pitt 0-1.		E Walsh 1-2, A Healy 1-1, E Donoghue and M Murphy 0-5 each, A Murphy, G Nolan, A McCarthy 0-2 each, P Hogan 0-1.

=== Munster Intermediate Hurling Championship ===
==== Munster quarter-final ====
14 May 2006 Quarter-final	Tipperary	4-13 - 2-08	Limerick	Semple Stadium
	A Fitzgerald 2-2, S Sweeney 0-4, S Stapleton 1-0, J Dixon 1-0, R O'Brien 0-3, E O Riain 0-2; C O'Brien 0-1; N Hogan 0-1.		J Moran 2-4, J Deere 0-1, M Clancy 0-1; J Quane 0-1, M Bodie 0-1.	Referee: A Heagney (Clare)

==== Munster semi-finals ====
28 May 2006 Semi-final	Cork	0-24 - 1-10	Clare	Semple Stadium
	D Dinneen 0-9, R O'Dwyer 0-5, R Doherty 0-4, M O'Sullivan 0-3, J Russell 0-2; S Hayes 0-1.		B Gaffney 1-5, C McKeogh 0-2, J Cusack 0-2, C Lafferty 0-1.	Referee: D Richardson (Limerick)

4 June 2006 Semi-final	Tipperary	1-13 - 0-15	Waterford	Páirc Uí Chaoimh
	R O'Brien 1-5, B Hogan 0-4; W Keogh 0-1, S Sweeney 0-1, C O'Brien 0-1, S Stapleton 0-1.		J Wall 0-9, E Bennett 0-2, N Dunphy 0-2, D Howard 0-1; S Barron 0-1.	Referee: J Sexton (Cork)

==== Munster final ====
16 July 2006 Final	Cork	2-18 - 2-13	Tipperary	Páirc Uí Chaoimh
	R Conway (1-2), R O'Dwyer (1-2, 1f), D Dineen (0-4, 1 free, 1 65), J Russell (0-4), K Hartnett (0-2), M O'Sullivan (0-2), M O'Callaghan (0-1), R Doherty (0-1).	Report	R O'Brien (1-3, 1-1f), J Dixon (1-1), S Sweeney (0-4), A Fitzgerald (0-2), E Ryan (0-2), W Keogh (0-1).	Referee: G Hoey (Clare)

=== All-Ireland Intermediate Hurling Championship ===
==== All-Ireland semi-final ====
5 August 2006 Semi-final	Kilkenny	2-15 - 0-07	Galway	Semple Stadium
	E O'Donoghue 0-8 (8f), A Healy 1-1, C O'Loughlin 1-0, A Murphy 0-3, G Nolan, E Walsh, D O'Gorman 0-1 each.	Report	M Broderick 0-4 (4f), K Hooban 0-2, A Diviney 0-1 (f).	Referee: J Ryan (Tipperary)

==== All-Ireland final ====
26 August 2006 Final	Cork	3-15 - 1-18 (aet)	Kilkenny	Fraher Field
	R O’Dwyer 2-1, R Doherty 1-4, M O’Sullivan 0-5, D Dineen 0-4.	Report	E O’Donoghue 0-10, R Hogan 1-0, P Hogan 0-2, E Walsh 0-1, A Murphy 0-1, C O’Loughlin 0-1, D O’Gorman 0-1, M Murphy 0-1, A Hickey 0-1.

== Championship statistics ==
=== Top scorers ===
Top scorers overall

Rank	Player	County	Tally	Total	Matches	Average
1	Eddie O'Donoghue	Kilkenny	0-23	23	3	7.66
2	Rory O'Dwyer	Cork	3-08	17	3	5.66
2	Ronan O'Brien	Tipperary	2-11	17	3	5.66
2	Darren Dineen	Cork	0-17	17	3	5.66
5	Rory O'Doherty	Cork	1-09	12	3	4.00

Top scorers in a single game

Rank	Player	Club	Tally	Total	Opposition
1	John Anthony Moran	Limerick	2-04	10	Tipperary
1	Eddie O'Donoghue	Kilkenny	0-10	10	Cork
3	Darren Dineen	Cork	0-09	9	Clare
3	John Wall	Waterford	0-09	9	Tipperary
5	Aidan Fitzgerald	Tipperary	2-02	8	Limerick
5	Bernard Gaffney	Clare	1-05	8	Cork
5	Ronan O'Brien	Tipperary	1-05	8	Waterford
5	Eddie O'Donoghue	Kilkenny	0-08	8	Galway
9	Rory O'Dwyer	Cork	2-01	7	Kilkenny
9	Rory O'Doherty	Cork	1-04	7	Kilkenny
