= Eoin Dillon =

Irish hurler

Personal information
- Native name: Eoin Diolún (Irish)
- Born: 1 June 1987 (age 39) Milford, County Cork, Ireland
- Height: 6 ft 2 in (188 cm)

Sport
- Sport: Hurling
- Position: Full-back
Clubs
- Years: Club
- Milford; Avondhu
Club titles
- Cork titles: 0
College
- Years: College
- Cork Institute of Technology
College titles
- Fitzgibbon titles: 0
Inter-county*
Years	County	Apps (scores)
2010-2012	Cork	0 (0-00)
Inter-county titles
- Munster titles: 0
- All-Irelands: 0
- NHL: 0
- All Stars: 0
- *Inter County team apps and scores correct as of 16:49, 26 March 2019.

Eoin Dillon (born 1 June 1987) is an Irish hurler who plays for Cork Intermediate Championship club Milford. He played for the Cork senior hurling team for three years, during which time he usually lined out as a full-back.

Dillon began his hurling career at club level with Milford, while his early prowess also saw him selected for the Cork Institute of Technology in the Fitzgibbon Cup and the Avondhu divisional team.

At inter-county level, Dillon was part of the Cork minor team that won back-to-back Munster Championships in 2004 and 2005 before later winning a Munster Championship with the under-21 team in 2007. He was at midfield for the Cork intermediate All-Ireland Championship-winning team in 2009. Dillon joined the Cork senior team in 2010. From his debut he made a number of National League appearances but never lined out in the Championship. He left the panel in 2012.

== Career statistics ==
Team	Year	National League			Munster		All-Ireland		Total	
Team	Year	Division	Apps	Score	Apps	Score	Apps	Score	Apps	Score
Cork	2010	Division 1	1	0-00	0	0-00	0	0-00	1	0-00
Cork	2011	Division 1	2	0-00	—		—		2	0-00
Cork	2012	Division 1	—		—		—		—	
Career total			3	0-00	—		—		3	0-00

== Honours ==
Cork

- All-Ireland Intermediate Hurling Championship (1): 2009
- Munster Intermediate Hurling Championship (1): 2009
- Munster Under-21 Hurling Championship (1): 2007
- Munster Minor Hurling Championship (1): 2004, 2005
