= Kieran Joyce (hurler) =

Irish hurler

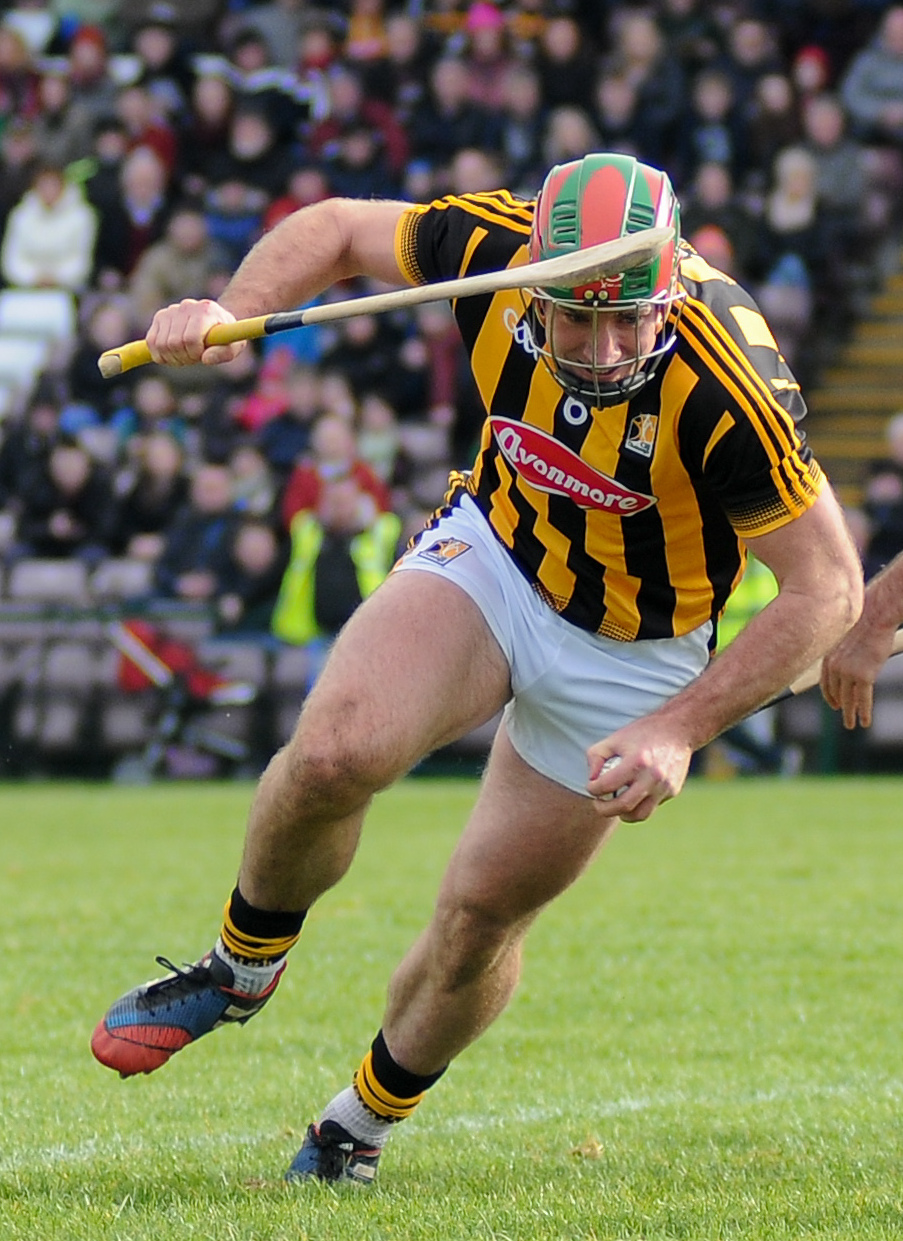
- Joyce with Kilkenny in the 2015 National Hurling League at Pearse Stadium

Personal information
- Native name: Ciarán Seoige (Irish)
- Born: 4 April 1987 (age 39) Portlaoise, County Laois, Ireland
- Occupation: Bank official
- Height: 6 ft 0 in (183 cm)

Sport
- Sport: Hurling
- Position: Left wing-back
Club
- Years: Club
- Rower–Inistioge
Club titles
- Kilkenny titles: 0
College
- Years: College
- 2006-2010: University of Limerick
College titles
- Fitzgibbon titles: 1
Inter-county*
Years	County	Apps (scores)
2011-2017	Kilkenny	23 (0-01)
Inter-county titles
- Leinster titles: 4
- All-Irelands: 4
- NHL: 3
- All Stars: 0
- *Inter County team apps and scores correct as of 19:58, 28 October 2017.

Kieran Joyce (born 4 April 1987) is an Irish hurler. His league and championship career with the Kilkenny senior team lasted seven seasons from 2011 until 2017.

Born in Portlaoise, County Laois, Joyce developed as a hurler during his secondary schooling at Good Counsel College in New Ross. While subsequently studying at the University of Limerick he captained the university hurling team to the Fitzgibbon Cup title.

At club level Joyce came to prominence at juvenile and underage levels with the Rower–Inistioge club, before eventually joining the club's adult team. An All-Ireland medal winner in the intermediate grade in 2014, Joyce also won Leinster and county championship medals.

Joyce made his debut on the inter-county scene at the age of seventeen when he was selected for the Kilkenny minor team. He enjoyed two championship seasons with the minor team and ended his tenure as an All-Ireland runner-up. He subsequently joined the Kilkenny under-21 team, winning two All-Ireland medals over the course of three years. After also winning an All-Ireland medal with the intermediate team, Joyce joined the extended Kilkenny senior panel in 2009, however, he didn't become a member of the regular panel until the 2011 championship. Over the course of the following seven seasons he won four All-Ireland medals, beginning with back-to-back championships in 2011 and 2012 and ending with back-to-back championships in 2014 and 2015. Joyce also won four Leinster medals and three National Hurling League medals. He announced his retirement on 26 October 2017.

After being selected for the Leinster inter-provincial team for the first time in 2013, Joyce was also selected on a number of subsequent occasions. He ended his career without an Interprovincial Championship medal.

== Playing career ==
=== University ===
In 2011 Joyce was captain of the University of Limerick team that reached the final of the inter-varsities championship. Local rivals Limerick Institute of Technology provided the opposition and led by nine points on two separate occasions in the first half. UL were transformed in the second half, even after being reduced to fourteen men after the dismissal of Willie Hyland. A 1–17 to 2–11 victory gave Joyce a Fitzgibbon Cup medal.

=== Club ===
In 2013 Joyce's club Rower–Inistioge faced Emeralds in the intermediate championship decider. The Rower started and finished strongly as they got the better of Emeralds in a tense decider. The 2–13 to 2–11 victory gave Joyce a championship medal. The Rower subsequently secured the Leinster crown following a narrow 1–9 to 0–10 defeat of Buffers Alley. On 8 February 2014 Rower–Inistioge faced Kilnadeema–Leitrim in the All-Ireland decider. Extra time was needed to separate the sides, however, Joyce collected an All-Ireland Intermediate Club Hurling Championship medal following a 1–16 to 1–9 victory.

=== Minor, under-21 and intermediate ===
Joyce first came to prominence on the inter-county scene as a member of the Kilkenny minor team in 2004. He won a Leinster medal that year following a heavy 1–15 to 1–4 defeat of Dublin. The subsequent All-Ireland decider on 12 September 2004 pitted Kilkenny against Galway. Richie Hogan proved to be the hero for Kilkenny, as his point, a minute into injury time, earned "the Cats" a 1–18 to 3–12 draw. The replay a week later was also a close affair, with Galway just about holding off the Kilkenny challenge. A 0–16 to 1–12 victory gave Joyce an All-Ireland Minor Hurling Championship medal.

By 2006 Joyce had linked up with the Kilkenny under-21 team. He won a Leinster medal that year following a 2–18 to 2–10 defeat of Dublin before later lining out in the All-Ireland decider against Tipperary on 10 September 2006. A last second opportunist goal by Richie Hogan saved Kilkenny and secured a 2-14 apiece draw. The replay a week later was another close encounter, however, Paddy Hogan's first half goal helped Kilkenny claw their way to the title. The 1–11 to 0–11 victory gave Joyce an All-Ireland medal.

After surrendering their provincial and All-Ireland crowns the following year, Joyce won a second Leinster medal in 2008 following a facile 2–21 to 2–9 defeat of Offaly. Old rivals Tipperary provided the opposition in the All-Ireland decider on 14 September 2008. Tipperary whittled down a six-point half-time deficit to just two with minutes to go, however, Kilkenny hung on to win by 2–13 to 0–15 and secure the Grand Slam of championship titles. It was also a second All-Ireland medal for Joyce.

Joyce was also a key member of the Kilkenny intermediate for a number of seasons. He won his first Leinster medal in this grade in 2006 following a 2–20 to 0-8 trouncing of Wexford. On 26 August 2006 Kilkenny faced Cork in the All-Ireland decider, however, a 3–15 to 1–18 defeat was Joyce's lot on that occasion.

Two years later in 2008 Joyce captured his second Leinster medal following a 4–26 to 3-15 trouncing of Dublin. On 30 August 2008 Kilkenny faced Limerick in the All-Ireland decider. A 1–16 to 0–13 victory gave Joyce an All-Ireland medal in that grade.

Joyce won a third Leinster medal in 2011 following a 2–19 to 2–8 defeat of Wexford in the provincial decider.

=== Senior ===
Joyce first linked up with the Kilkenny senior team in 2009 when he was a member of the extended training panel. He spent two years in this capacity before becoming a member of the match-day panel in 2011. He was an unused substitute during Kilkenny's successful Leinster and All-Ireland campaigns that year. In spite of not playing, Joyce was still presented with winners' medals.

2012 began well for Joyce as he made his debut during the National Hurling League. He ended the campaign with a winners' medal following a 3–21 to 0–16 demolition of old rivals Cork. Kilkenny were later shocked by Galway in the Leinster decider, losing by 2–21 to 2–11, however, both sides subsequently met in the All-Ireland decider on 9 September 2012. Kilkenny had led going into the final stretch, however, Joe Canning struck a stoppage time equaliser to level the game at 2–13 to 0–19 and send the final to a replay for the first time since 1959. The replay took place three weeks later on 30 September 2012. Galway stunned the reigning champions with two first-half goals, however, Kilkenny's championship debutant Walter Walsh gave a man of the match performance. The 3–22 to 3–11 Kilkenny victory gave Joyce a second All-Ireland medal and his first on the field of play.

Kilkenny's dominance showed no sign of abating in 2013, with Joyce winning a second league medal following a 2–17 to 0–20 defeat of Tipperary in the decider.

In 2014 Joyce collected his third successive league medal, as Kilkenny secured a narrow one-point 2–25 to 1–27 extra-time victory over Tipperary. Joyce subsequently secured his first Leinster medal on the field of play, as a dominant Kilkenny display gave "the Cats" a 0–24 to 1–9 defeat of Dublin. On 7 September 2014 Kilkenny faced Tipperary in the All-Ireland decider. In what some consider to be the greatest game of all time, the sides were level when Tipperary were awarded a controversial free. John O'Dwyer had the chance to win the game, however, his late free drifted wide resulting in a draw. The replay on 27 September 2014 was also a close affair. Goals from brothers Richie and John Power inspired Kilkenny to a 2–17 to 2–14 victory. It was Joyce's third All-Ireland medal overall.

Joyce won a third Leinster medal in 2015 following a 1–25 to 2–15 defeat of Galway in the provincial decider. It was Kilkenny's 70th provincial title. Kilkenny and Galway later renewed their rivalry when they faced each other again in the All-Ireland final on 6 September 2015. The team struggled in the first half, however, a T. J. Reid goal and a dominant second half display, which limited Galway to just 1–4, saw Kilkenny power to a 1–22 to 1–18 victory. It was Joyce's fourth All-Ireland medal overall.

Kilkenny retained the Leinster title in 2016, with Joyce claiming a fourth winners' medal following a 1–26 to 0–22 defeat of Galway. Kilkenny subsequently qualified for an All-Ireland final meeting with Tipperary on 5 September 2016. While just two points separated the sides at the interval, Tipperary completely outplayed Kilkenny for the second half. A total of 2-21 for their inside forward line of Séamus Callanan, John McGrath and John O'Dwyer helped them to a huge 2–29 to 2–20 victory.

After disappointing league and championship campaigns in 2017, Joyce announced his retirement from inter-county hurling on 26 October 2017.

== Career statistics ==
Team	Year	National League			Leinster		All-Ireland		Total	
Team	Year	Division	Apps	Score	Apps	Score	Apps	Score	Apps	Score
Kilkenny	2011	Division 1	0	0-00	0	0-00	0	0-00	0	0-00
Kilkenny	2012	Division 1A	4	0-01	1	0-00	4	0-01	9	0-02
Kilkenny	2013	Division 1A	7	0-01	3	0-00	3	0-00	13	0-01
Kilkenny	2014	Division 1A	4	0-01	2	0-00	1	0-00	7	0-01
Kilkenny	2015	Division 1A	6	0-02	2	0-00	2	0-00	10	0-02
Kilkenny	2016	Division 1A	6	0-01	2	0-00	2	0-00	10	0-01
Kilkenny	2017	Division 1A	4	0-01	1	0-00	0	0-00	5	0-01
Total			31	0-07	11	0-00	12	0-01	54	0-08

== Honours ==
University of Limerick

- Fitzgibbon Cup (1): 2011 (c)

Rower–Inistioge

- All-Ireland Intermediate Club Hurling Championship (1): 2014
- Leinster Intermediate Club Hurling Championship (1): 2013
- Kilkenny Intermediate Hurling Championship (1): 2013

Kilkenny

- All-Ireland Senior Hurling Championship (4): 2011, 2012, 2014, 2015
- Leinster Senior Hurling Championship (4): 2011, 2014, 2015, 2016
- National Hurling League (3): 2012, 2013, 2014
- All-Ireland Intermediate Hurling Championship (1): 2008
- Leinster Intermediate Hurling Championship (3): 2006, 2008, 2011
- All-Ireland Under-21 Hurling Championship (2): 2006, 2008
- Leinster Under-21 Hurling Championship (2): 2006, 2008
- Leinster Minor Hurling Championship (1): 2004

Achievements
Preceded by Finian Coone	Fitzgibbon Cup Final winning captain 2011	Succeeded by Shane Bourke
Awards
Preceded by Richie Hogan	All-Ireland Senior Hurling Final; Man of the Match; 2014 (replay)	Succeeded by Michael Fennelly
