= 2004 All-Ireland Intermediate Hurling Championship =

Championship Details
- Dates: 16 May – 4 September 2004
- Teams: 9

All Ireland Champions
- Winners: Cork (5th win)
- Captain: Brendan Walsh
- Manager: Johnny Keane

All Ireland Runners-up
- Runners-up: Kilkenny
- Captain: David Buggy
- Manager: Maurice Power

Provincial Champions
- Munster: Cork
- Leinster: Kilkenny
- Ulster: Not Played
- Connacht: Not Played

Championship Statistics
- Matches Played: 9
- Total Goals: 31 (3.44 per game)
- Total Points: 230 (25.55 per game)
- Top Scorer: Darren Dineen (1-18)

The 2004 All-Ireland Intermediate Hurling Championship was the 21st staging of the All-Ireland hurling championship. The championship began on 16 May 2004 and ended on 4 September 2004.

Cork were the defending champions and successfully retained the title after defeating Kilkenny by 1–16 to 1–10 in a replay of the final.

== Team summaries ==
Team	Colours	Most recent success	
Team	Colours	All-Ireland	Provincial
Antrim	Saffron and white		1973
Clare	Saffron and blue		
Cork	Red and white	2003	2003
Galway	Maroon and white	2002	1998
Kilkenny	Black and amber	1973	2003
Limerick	Green and white	1998	1998
Tipperary	Blue and gold	2000	2002
Waterford	White and blue		
Wexford	Purple and gold	1964	2002

== Leinster Intermediate Hurling Championship ==
=== Leinster final ===
30 June 2004 Final	Wexford	1-10 - 3-17	Kilkenny	Wexford Park
	P White 0-6, J Lawlor 1-0, D Mythen 0-2, G Coleman 0-1, M Kelly 0-1.	Report	D Buggy 1-4; M Grace 0-6; J Power 1-2; E McGrath 1-1; E Walsh 0-3; D Mackey 0-1.

== Munster Intermediate Hurling Championship ==
=== Munster quarter-final ===
16 May 2004 Quarter-final	Clare	2-13 - 0-11	Waterford	Semple Stadium
	E Taaffe 1-6, B Nugent 0-5, S Arthur 1-1, C Earlie 0-1.		P Kearney 0-7, D Howard 0-2, C Watt 0-1, D Murphy 0-1.	Referee: D Richardson (Limerick)

=== Munster semi-finals ===
30 May 2004 Semi-final	Limerick	1-10 - 1-21	Cork	Gaelic Grounds
	P Heffernan 0-5, D Clancy 1-1, P Neenan 0-2, J Lynch 0-1, A O'Connor 0-1.		D Dineen 1-5, R O'Doherty 0-5, P McGrath 0-3, D Fitzgerald 0-3, S Dineen 0-2, S Hayes 0-1, E Conway 0-1.	Referee: G Hoey (Clare)

6 June 2004 Semi-final	Tipperary	2-20 - 3-09	Clare	Páirc Uí Chaoimh
	T Slevin 1-5, P Buckley 1-1, B Gaynor 0-3, R O'Brien 0-3, B Hogan 0-2, C O'Brien 0-2, S Everard 0-2, E Ryan 0-1, S McGrath 0-1.		E Taaffe 2-3, B Nugent 1-3, F Flynn 0-1, C Earlie 0-1, B Shally 0-1.	Referee: J Sexton (Limerick)

=== Munster final ===
14 July 2004 Final	Cork	0-18 - 1-09	Tipperary	Páirc Uí Rinn
	D Dineen 0-9 (0-8f), C O'Reilly 0-3, P McGrath 0-2, E Conway 0-2, S Hayes 0-1, R O'Doherty 0-1.	Report	J Leahy 1-1 (1-0f), T Slevin 0-2, B Hogan 0-2f, B Gaynor 0-2, D Maher 0-1, R O'Brien 0-1.	Referee: P Moore (Waterford)

== All-Ireland Intermediate Hurling Championship ==
=== All-Ireland semi-finals ===
7 August 2004 Semi-final	Kilkenny	2-13 - 2-11	Galway	St. Brendan's Park
	J Power 2-1, D Buggy 0-4f, C Herity 0-4, M Grace 0-2, D Mackey, J Phelan 0-1 each.	Report	A Callanan 2-1, C Dervan 0-4, K Burke, K Hubin 0-2 each, W Lawless, D Reilly 0-1 each.	Referee: J McDonnell (Tipperary)

14 August 2004 Semi-final	Cork	5-09 - 2-11	Antrim	Parnell Park
	R O’Doherty, E Conway 2-0 each; P Dineen 1-0; D Dineen (0-1 free), B O’Dwyer 0-3 each; J Olden, J Russell, D Fitzgerald (free) 0-1 each	Report	P Cunningham 0-7 (0-4 frees); B Quinn 1-2 (0-1 free); K McMullen 1-0; E McKellop (free), P Donnelly 0-1 each.	Referee: J Kelly (Wexford)

=== All-Ireland final ===
22 August 2004 Final	Cork	2-11 - 2-11	Kilkenny	Semple Stadium
	R Doherty 1-2, J Russell 1-1, D Fitzgerald 0-5 (0-3 frees, 0-1 65), S Hayes, E Conway, D Dineen (free) 0-1 each.	Report	B Phelan 1-1, E Walsh 1-0, D Buggy 0-5 (0-2 frees, 0-1 65), C Herity 0-3 (0-2 65s), PJ Corcoran, M Grace 0-1 each.	Referee: S Roche (Tipperary)

4 September 2004 Final replay	Cork	1-16 - 1-10	Kilkenny	Semple Stadium
	S Hayes (1-1), D Fitzgerald (0-3), R Doherty (0-2), E Conway (0-2), D Dineen (0-2), B O'Dwyer (0-2), J Masters (0-2), N Murphy (0-1), J Olden (0-1).	Report	R Power (0-5), J Power (1-0), D Buggy (0-2), C Herity (0-1), M Grace (0-1), JP Corcoran (0-1).	Referee: P Ahern (Carlow)

== Championship statistics ==
=== Top scores ===
Overall

Rank	Player	Team	Tally	Total	Matches	Average
1	Darren Dineen	Cork	1-18	21	5	4.20
2	Rory O'Doherty	Cork	3-10	19	5	3.80
3	Éamonn Taaffe	Clare	3-09	18	2	9.00
4	David Buggy	Kilkenny	1-15	18	4	4.50
5	Jamie Power	Kilkenny	4-03	15	4	3.75

In a single game

Rank	Player	Team	Tally	Total	Opposition
1	Éamonn Taaffe	Clare	2-03	9	Tipperary
1	Éamonn Taaffe	Clare	1-06	9	Waterford
1	Darren Dineen	Cork	0-09	9	Tipperary
4	Darren Dineen	Cork	1-05	8	Limerick
4	Tadhg Slevin	Tipperary	1-05	8	Clare
6	Jamie Power	Kilkenny	2-01	7	Galway
6	Aonghus Callanan	Galway	2-01	7	Kilkenny
6	David Buggy	Kilkenny	1-04	7	Wexford
6	Paul Kearney	Waterford	0-07	7	Clare
6	Paddy Cunningham	Antrim	0-07	7	Cork
