= Stephen Doyle =

Stephen, Steve or Steven Doyle may refer to:

- Stephen Doyle (footballer) (born 1981), Australian rules footballer
- Stephen Doyle (hurler), Irish hurler
- Steve Doyle (footballer) (born 1958), Welsh football midfielder
- Steve Doyle (politician) (born 1958), Wisconsin politician
- Steven Doyle, president of the United States Chess Federation from 1984 to 1987
