= David Redmond =

Irish hurler

Personal information
- Native name: Daithí Mac Réamoinn (Irish)
- Born: 19 September 1987 (age 39) The Ballagh, County Wexford, Ireland
- Occupation: Teacher

Sport
- Sport: Hurling
- Position: Midfield
Club
- Years: Club
- Oulart–The Ballagh
Club titles
- Wexford titles: 8
- Leinster titles: 1
Inter-county
| Years | County | Apps (scores) |
| 2007-2018 | Wexford | 33 (4-32) |
Inter-county titles
- Leinster titles: 0
- All-Irelands: 0
- NHL: 0
- All Stars: 0

David Redmond (born 19 September 1987) is an Irish hurler. His league and championship career with the Wexford senior team lasted eleven seasons from 2007 until 2017.

Born in The Ballagh, County Wexford, Redmond first played competitive hurling and Gaelic football at juvenile and underage levels with Oulart–The Ballagh. After much success in these grades he later joined the club's senior team. Since then he has won one Leinster medal and eight county senior championship medal.

Redmond made his debut on the inter-county scene at the age of seventeen when he was selected for the Wexford minor team. His sole season with the minor team ended without success. Redmond subsequently enjoyed an unsuccessful period with the Wexford under-21 team, however, his tenure with the intermediate team yielded an All-Ireland medal in 2007. By this stage he had also joined the Wexford senior team, making his debut during the 2008 league. Over the next decade, Redmond proved to be one of the team's most versatile players, having lined out in defence, midfield, and in attack. He played his last game for Wexford in July 2017 and announced his retirement from inter-county hurling on 17 January 2018.

== Career statistics ==
| Team | Year | Leinster | | All-Ireland | | Total | |
| Team | Year | Apps | Score | Apps | Score | Apps | Score |
|---|---|---|---|---|---|---|---|
| Wexford | 2007 | 0 | 0-00 | 0 | 0-00 | 0 | 0-00 |
| Wexford | 2008 | 3 | 0-04 | 1 | 0-02 | 4 | 0-06 |
| Wexford | 2009 | 2 | 0-03 | 2 | 0-02 | 4 | 0-05 |
| Wexford | 2010 | 0 | 0-00 | 0 | 0-00 | 0 | 0-00 |
| Wexford | 2011 | 2 | 1-02 | 1 | 0-01 | 3 | 1-03 |
| Wexford | 2012 | 1 | 0-00 | 3 | 0-04 | 4 | 0-04 |
| Wexford | 2013 | 2 | 0-00 | 3 | 1-02 | 5 | 1-02 |
| Wexford | 2014 | 2 | 0-01 | 4 | 1-02 | 6 | 1-03 |
| Wexford | 2015 | 2 | 0-05 | 1 | 0-03 | 3 | 0-08 |
| Wexford | 2016 | 0 | 0-00 | 0 | 0-00 | 0 | 0-00 |
| Wexford | 2017 | 3 | 1-01 | 1 | 0-00 | 4 | 1-01 |
| Total | | 17 | 2-16 | 16 | 2-16 | 33 | 4-32 |

== Honours ==
Oulart–The Ballagh

- Leinster Senior Club Hurling Championship (1): 2015
- Wexford Senior Hurling Championship (8): 2007, 2009, 2010, 2011, 2012, 2013, 2015, 2016

Wexford

- All-Ireland Intermediate Hurling Championship (1): 2007
- Leinster Intermediate Hurling Championship (1): 2007
