= Luke O'Farrell =

Irish hurler

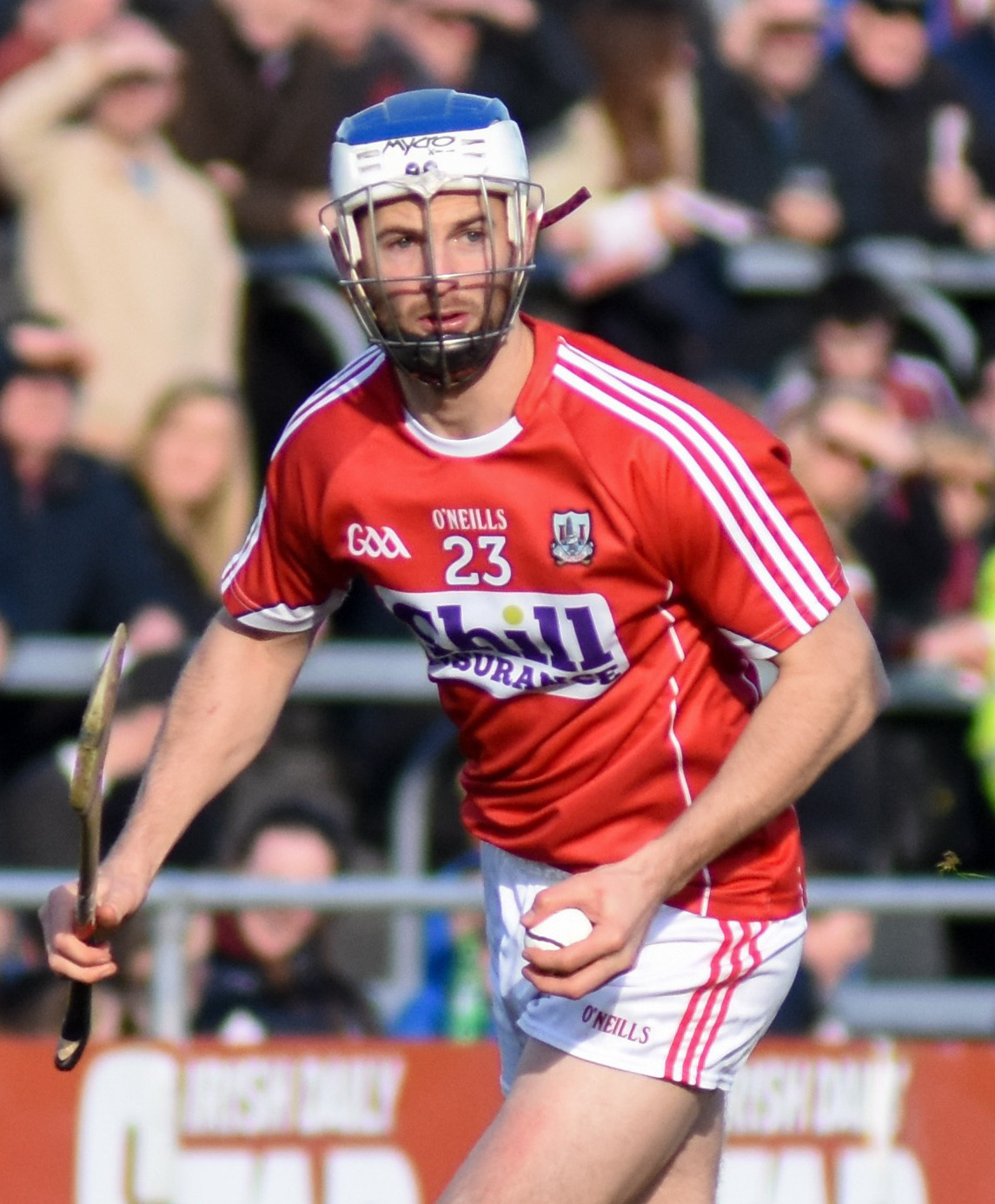
- O'Farrell in 2016

Personal information
- Native name: Lúc Ó Fearghaill (Irish)
- Born: 25 February 1990 (age 36) Midleton, County Cork, Ireland
- Occupation: Primary school teacher
- Height: 6 ft 0 in (183 cm)

Sport
- Sport: Hurling
- Position: Right corner-forward
Club*
Years	Club	Apps (scores)
2007-present	Midleton	69 (24-134)
Club titles
- Cork titles: 1
College(s)
- Years: College
- University College Cork; Mary Immaculate College
College titles
- Fitzgibbon titles: 0
Inter-county**
Years	County	Apps (scores)
2010-2017	Cork	24 (4-19)
Inter-county titles
- Munster titles: 1
- All-Irelands: 0
- NHL: 0
- All Stars: 0
- * club appearances and scores correct as of 22:13, 31 October 2024. **Inter County team apps and scores correct as of 19:28, 27 March 2019.

Luke O'Farrell (born 25 February 1990) is an Irish hurler who plays for Cork Senior Championship club Midleton. He played for the Cork senior hurling team for seven years, during which time he usually lined out as a right corner-forward.

== Playing career ==
=== Midleton CBS ===
O'Farrell played in all grades of hurling with Midleton CBS Secondary School before progressing onto the college's senior team. On 12 March 2006, he scored a goal from full-forward when Midelton CBS defeated St. Flannan's College from Ennis by 2–08 to 0–12 to win the Harty Cup.

=== Midleton ===
O'Farrell joined the Midleton club at a young age and played in all grades at juvenile and underage levels. On 20 November 2011, he was at full-forward when Midleton defeated Duhallow by 1–11 to 0–08 to win the Cork Under-21 Championship title for the first time in 22 years.

O'Farrell was just 17-years-old when made his senior championship debut on 5 May 2007. He scored 1–01 in a 1–11 to 0–12 defeat of Killeagh in the first round.

On 3 November 2013, O'Farrell was at right wing-forward when Midleton faced Sarsfields in the final. He scored three points from play and collected a winners' medal after the 2–15 to 2–13 victory.

O'Farrell was appointed captain of the Midleton team for the 2018 championship. On 14 October, he led the team to a 4–19 to 1–18 defeat by Imokilly in the final.

=== Cork ===
==== Minor and under-21 ====
O'Farrell first played for Cork as a member of the minor team. He made his first appearance on 2 May 2007 when he scored three points from right wing-forward in Cork's 3–15 to 0–09 defeat of Waterford. On 8 July, O'Farrell was again at right corner-forward for Cork's 0–18 to 1-11 Munster Championship final defeat by Tipperary. On 2 September, he again lined out at right corner-forward in the All-Ireland final against Tipperary. O'Farrell scored a goal in the 3–14 to 2–11 defeat.

O'Farrell was also eligible for the minor grade in 2008. On 13 July, he was an unused substitute for Cork's 0–19 to 0-18 Munster Championship final defeat of Tipperary.

On 3 June 2009, O'Farrell made his first appearance for the Cork under-21 team. He scored two points from play after being introduced as a 34th-minute substitute for Robert O'Driscoll in a 2–22 to 0–25 defeat by Tipperary in the Munster Championship.

On 3 August 2011, O'Farrell, who was in his final year in the under-21 grade, lined out in the Munster Championship final. He scored 1-02 from play in the 4–20 to 1-27 extra-time defeat by Limerick. It was his last game for the Cork under-21 team.

==== Intermediate ====
O'Farrell was drafted onto the Cork intermediate team for the 2009 Munster Championship. He made his first appearance on 21 June when he scored 1-03 from full-forward in Cork's 2–15 to 1–14 defeat of Clare. On 22 July, O'Farrell won a Munster Championship medal after scoring three points in Cork's 5–24 to 3–09 defeat of Waterford in the final. On 29 August, he scored 1-02 from full-forward in Cork's 2–23 to 0–16 defeat of Kilkenny in the All-Ireland final.

==== Senior ====
O'Farrell made his first appearance for the Cork senior team on 21 March 2010. He was introduced as a half-time substitute in Cork's 3–17 to 2–20 draw with Waterford in the National League. On 2 May, O'Farrell was an unused substitute when Cork suffered a 2–22 to 1–17 defeat by Galway in the National League final. He made his first championship appearance on 17 July when he came on as a 65th-minute substitute for Kieran Murphy in Cork's 1–16 to 1–13 defeat by Waterford in the Munster Championship final replay.

On 6 May 2012, O'Farrell lined out in his second National League final. He was held scoreless from right corner-forward in the 3–21 to 0–16 defeat by Kilkenny.

O'Farrell lined out in his second Munster Championship final on 14 July 2013. He scored a point from play in Cork's 0–24 to 0–15 defeat by Limerick. On 8 September, O'Farrell lined out at right corner-forward against Clare in the All-Ireland final. He was held scoreless in the 3–16 to 0–25 draw. O'Farrell was again at right corner-forward for the replay on 28 September and was again held scoreless in the 5–16 to 3–16 defeat.

On 3 May 2015, O'Farrell was introduced as a substitute for Rob O'Shea in Cork's 1–24 to 0–17 defeat by Waterford in the National League final.

O'Farrell won a Munster Championship medal on 9 July 2017 after coming on as a substitute for Darragh Fitzgibbon in the 1–25 to 1–20 defeat of Clare in the final.

== Career statistics ==
=== Club ===
As of 6 October 2024.

Team	Season	Cork		Munster		All-Ireland		Total	
Team	Season	Apps	Score	Apps	Score	Apps	Score	Apps	Score
Midleton	2007-08	3	1-03	—		—		3	1-03
Midleton	2008-09	0	0-00	—		—		0	0-00
Midleton	2009-10	4	1-12	—		—		4	1-12
Midleton	2010-11	4	2-10	—		—		4	2-10
Midleton	2011-12	4	2-06	—		—		4	2-06
Midleton	2012-13	3	1-01	—		—		3	1-01
Midleton	2013-14	5	0-13	1	0-01	—		6	0-14
Midleton	2014-15	3	1-06	—		—		3	1-06
Midleton	2015-16	4	0-06	—		—		4	0-06
Midleton	2016-17	5	3-13	—		—		5	3-13
Midleton	2017-18	3	2-09	—		—		3	2-09
Midleton	2018-19	5	1-09	1	0-01	—		6	1-10
Midleton	2019-20	2	0-03	—		—		2	0-03
Midleton	2020-21	3	2-05	—		—		3	2-05
Midleton	2021-22	6	4-14	—		—		6	4-14
Midleton	2022-23	3	1-05	—		—		3	1-05
Midleton	2023-24	5	2-06	—		—		5	2-06
Midleton	2024-25	5	1-11	—		—		5	1-11
Career total		67	24-132	2	0-02	—		69	24-134

=== Inter-county ===
Team	Year	National League			Munster		All-Ireland		Total	
Team	Year	Division	Apps	Score	Apps	Score	Apps	Score	Apps	Score
Cork	2010	Division 1	3	1-01	1	0-00	0	0-00	4	1-01
Cork	2011	Division 1	4	2-06	1	0-00	3	2-00	8	4-06
Cork	2012	Division 1A	4	1-02	1	0-00	4	2-04	9	3-06
Cork	2013	Division 1A	6	3-05	2	0-03	4	0-03	12	3-11
Cork	2014	Division 1B	1	0-00	—		—		1	0-00
Cork	2015	Division 1A	8	2-06	1	0-01	0	0-00	9	2-07
Cork	2016	Division 1A	4	0-05	1	0-01	2	0-04	7	0-10
Cork	2017	Division 1A	2	0-00	3	0-02	1	0-01	6	0-03
Total			32	9-25	10	0-07	14	4-12	56	13-44

== Honours ==
Midleton CBS

- Dr. Harty Cup (1): 2006

Midleton

- Cork Senior Hurling Championship (1): 2013

Cork

- Munster Senior Hurling Championship (1): 2017
- All-Ireland Intermediate Hurling Championship (1): 2009
- Munster Intermediate Hurling Championship (1): 2009
- Munster Minor Hurling Championship (1): 2008
