= Andy Dunworth =

Irish hurler

Personal information
- Native name: Aindriú Ó Donnuartaigh (Irish)
- Born: 1946 Banogue, County Limerick, Ireland
- Died: 25 April 2013 (aged 66) New York City, United States
- Occupation: Hospitality industry worker
- Height: 5 ft 9 in (175 cm)

Sport
- Sport: Hurling
- Position: Goalkeeper
Clubs
- Years: Club
- Banogue; Emmets; Bruree; Claughaun
Club titles
- Limerick titles: 2
Inter-county*
Years	County	Apps (scores)
1966-1973	Limerick	9 (0-00)
Inter-county titles
- Munster titles: 0
- All-Irelands: 0
- NHL: 0
- All Stars: 0
- *Inter County team apps and scores correct as of 21:50, 16 September 2014.

Andy Dunworth (1946 – 25 April 2013) was an Irish hurler who played as a goalkeeper for the Limerick senior team.

Born in Banogue, County Limerick, Dunworth first arrived on the inter-county scene at the age of sixteen when he first linked up with the Limerick minor team. He made his senior debut during the 1966 championship. Dunworth went on to play a key part for Limerick, and won one All-Ireland medal, one Munster medal and one National Hurling League medal, albeit as a non-playing substitute.

At club level Dunworth was a two-time championship medallist with Claughaun. He also played with Banogue, Emmets and Bruree.

Throughout his career Dunworth made 9 championship appearances. He retired from inter-county hurling following the conclusion of the 1973 championship.

== Honours ==
=== Team ===
Bruree

- Limerick Under-21 Hurling Championship (1): 1965

Claughaun

- Limerick Senior Hurling Championship (2): 1968, 1971

Limerick

- All-Ireland Senior Hurling Championship (1): 1973 (sub)
- Munster Senior Hurling Championship (1): 1973 (sub)
- National Hurling League (1): 1970-71 (sub)
- Munster Minor Hurling Championship (1): 1963
