= Shane Casey (hurler) =

Irish sportsperson

Personal information
- Native name: Seán Ó Cathasaigh (Irish)
- Nickname: Bangors
- Born: 1989 (age 36–37) Dunhill, County Waterford

Sport
- Sport: Hurling
- Position: Right corner forward
Club
- Years: Club
- 1990s -: Dunhill
Inter-county*
Years	County	Apps (scores)
2009-	Waterford	1 (0-00)
Inter-county titles
- Munster titles: 1
- All-Irelands: 0
- NHL: 0
- *Inter County team apps and scores correct as of 18 July 2010.

Shane Casey (born 1989) is an Irish sportsperson. He plays hurling with his local club Dunhill and with the Waterford senior inter-county team.

== Hurling career ==
=== Club ===
Casey has played with this local club, Dunhill since underage, including in the Waterford Intermediate Hurling Championship and the Waterford Intermediate Football Championship. At underage, Casey played with the amalgamation club Dunhill/Fenor.

=== Inter-county ===
At inter-county level, Casey has played with Waterford. Casey made his championship debut on 26 July 2009 having been named in the team which beat Galway in the 2009 All-Ireland Senior Hurling Championship quarter-final.

Casey also played with the Waterford under-21 team. Casey was named in the squad to face Clare in the Munster Under-21 Hurling Final on 29 July 2009.
