= Stephen Doyle (hurler) =

Irish sportsman

Personal information
- Native name: Stiofáin Ó Dúil (Irish)
- Born: Oulart, County Wexford

Sport
- Sport: Hurling
- Position: Midfield
Club
- Years: Club
- Oulart–The Ballagh
Inter-county
- Years: County
- 2007-2011: Wexford
Inter-county titles
- NHL: 1 (Div 2)

Stephen Doyle is an Irish sportsman. He plays hurling for Wexford and his club, Oulart–The Ballagh.
