= 2002 All-Ireland Intermediate Hurling Championship =

Championship Details
- Dates: 19 May – 21 September 2002
- Teams: 11

All Ireland Champions
- Winners: Galway (2nd win)
- Captain: Shane McClearn
- Manager: Vincent Mullins

All Ireland Runners-up
- Runners-up: Tipperary
- Captain: Colin Morrissey
- Manager: Liam Sheedy

Provincial Champions
- Munster: Tipperary
- Leinster: Wexford
- Ulster: Not Played
- Connacht: Not Played

Championship Statistics
- Matches Played: 11
- Total Goals: 44 (4.00 per game)
- Total Points: 311 (28.27 per game)
- Top Scorer: Brian Cunningham (1-30)

The 2002 All-Ireland Intermediate Hurling Championship was the 19th staging of the All-Ireland Intermediate Hurling Championship since its establishment by the Gaelic Athletic Association in 1961. The championship ran from 19 May to 22 September 2002.

Cork entered the championship as the defending champions, however, they were beaten by Waterford in the Munster semi-final.

The All-Ireland final replay was played at St. Brendan's Park in Birr on 21 September 2002 between Galway and Tipperary, in what was their first meeting in the final in two years. Galway won the match by 2-15 to 1-10 to claim a second All-Ireland title overall and a first title in three years.

Galway's Brian Cunningham was the championship's top scorer with 1-30.

== Leinster Intermediate Hurling Championship ==
=== Quarter-finals ===
5 June 2002 Quarter-final	Laois	0-06 - 3-21	Wexford	O'Moore Park
	E Meagher 0-2, T Russell 0-2, D Russell 0-1, T Doran 0-1.		E Cullen 2-3, M Jacob 0-8, MJ Reck 0-4, P Carley 1-0, C McGrath 0-2, PJ Carley 0-2, R Hassey 0-1, R Murphy 0-1.

=== Leinster semi-finals ===
19 June 2002 Semi-final	Wexford	6-25 - 1-06	Offaly	Wexford Park
	C McGrath 2-7, M Jacob 1-4, R Murphy 1-2, D Kent 1-0, N Higgins 1-0, MJ Reck 0-3, M O'Leary 0-2, PJ Carley 0-2, E Cullen 0-2, J Kenny 0-2, R Hassey 0-1.		N Hogan 1-1, D Hanniffy 0-3, D McEvoy 0-2.

19 June 2002 Semi-final	Dublin	0-06 - 2-26	Kilkenny	Parnell Park
	P Berrigan 0-2, D Sweeney 0-2, E Duane 0-1, B Rush 0-1.		O O'Connor 0-11, B Phelan 2-0, J Barron 0-4, J Power 0-3, N Doherty 0-2, A Cleere 0-2, P Sheehan 0-2, S Lanigan 0-1, C Muldowney 0-1.

=== Leinster final ===
10 July 2002 Final	Wexford	2-15 - 0-19 (aet)	Kilkenny	Wexford Park
	C McGrath 1-7, E Cullen 1-1, F Simpson 0-3, M Jacob 0-3, N Higgins 0-1, D Lyng 0-1.		O O'Connor 0-6, P Farrell 0-4, J Barron 0-2, B Phelan 0-2, D Mackey 0-2, J Power 0-1, N Doherty 0-1, P Sheehan 0-1.

== Munster Intermediate Hurling Championship ==
=== Munster quarter-final ===
19 May 2002 Quarter-final	Tipperary	2-13 - 1-10	Clare	Páirc Uí Chaoimh
	B Hogan 1-2, S Everard 1-2, B Stritch 0-4, P Buckley 0-3, G Maguire 0-1, D Hackett 0-1.		E Taaffe 1-5, A O'Brien 0-2, I Conway 0-1, F Lynch 0-1, G O'Grady 0-1.	Referee: M Healy (Cork)

=== Munster semi-finals ===
26 May 2002 Semi-final	Waterford	3-16 - 2-13	Cork	Semple Stadium
	S Daly 1-7, S Ryan 1-1, S Cunningham 1-0, P Prendergast 0-3, M Molumphy 0-2, N Power 0-2, R McGrath 0-1.		J Quinlan 1-6, S O'Farrell 1-1, D Broderick 0-2, S Killeen 0-2, D Dineen 0-1, G Holland 0-1.

2 June 2002 Semi-final	Tipperary	4-22 - 3-10	Limerick	Páirc Uí Chaoimh
	B Hogan 1-10, G Maguire 1-4, S Everard 1-2, D Hackett 1-0, B Stritch 0-3, P Buckley 0-2; S Maher 0-1.		P Kirby 1-4, J McDermott 1-1, T O'Connor 1-0, A O'Connor 0-2, M Tobin 0-1; B Tobin 0-1, D O'Brien 0-1.

=== Munster final ===
17 July 2002 Final	Tipperary	4-08 - 2-07	Waterford	Páirc Uí Chaoimh
	G Maguire (1-2), S Everard (1-1), J Teehan (1-1); D Hackett (1-0), B Hogan (0-3), S Maher (0-1).		M Molumphy (2-0), B Phelan (0-3), P Fitzgerald (0-2), Alan Kirwin (0-1), M Walsh (0-1).

== All-Ireland Intermediate Hurling Championship ==
=== All-Ireland semi-final ===
10 August 2002 Semi-final	Galway	1-19 - 1-07	Wexford	O'Connor Park
	B Cunningham 1-9, J Conroy 0-4, K Brady 0-2, S Tierney 0-2, Aidan Diviney 0-1, T Kavanagh 0-1.		E Cullen 0-4, F Simpson 1-0, C McGrath 0-2, D Lyng 0-1.

=== All-Ireland final ===
31 August 2002 Final	Galway	2-20 - 2-17 (aet)	Tipperary	St. Brendan's Park
	B Cunningham 0-12, J Conroy 1-1, K Brady 0-3, J Campbell 0-2, A Diviney 0-1, G Glynn 0-1.		M Keeshan 1-3, B Hogan 0-5, B Gaynor 1-0, B Stritch 0-2, T Connors 0-2, P Buckley 0-1, G Maguire 0-1, C Ryan 0-1, S Maher 0-1, J Teehan 0-1.	Referee: P Neary (Kilkenny)

21 September 2002 Final replay	Galway	2-15 - 1-10	Tipperary	St. Brendan's Park
	B Cunningham 0-9, B Lawless 1-0, J Campbell 1-0, C Ryan 0-2, Aidan Diviney 0-2, K Brady 0-2.		S Everard 1-2, B Hogan 0-3, P Buckley 0-1, G Maguire 0-1, Shane Maher 0-1, Seán Maher 0-1, C Ryan 0-1.	Referee: E Morris (Dublin)

== Championship statistics ==
=== Top scorers ===
Overall

Rank	Player	County	Tally	Total	Matches	Average
1	Brian Cunningham	Galway	1-30	33	3	11.00
2	Brendan Hogan	Tipperary	2-23	29	5	5.80
3	Chris McGrath	Wexford	3-18	27	4	6.75
4	Simon Everard	Tipperary	4-07	19	5	3.80
4	Eddie Cullen	Wexford	3-10	19	4	4.75
6	Michael Jacob	Wexford	1-15	18	4	4.50
7	Ollie O'Connor	Kilkenny	0-17	17	2	8.50
8	Ger Maguire	Tipperary	2-09	15	5	3.00
9	Seán Daly	Waterford	1-07	10	1	10.00
10	John Quinlan	Cork	1-06	9	1	9.00
10	Brian Stritch	Tipperary	0-09	9	5	1.80

In a single game

Rank	Player	Club	Tally	Total	Opposition
1	Chris McGrath	Wexford	2-07	13	Offaly
1	Brendan Hogan	Tipperary	1-10	13	Limerick
3	Brian Cunningham	Galway	1-09	12	Wexford
3	Brian Cunningham	Galway	0-12	12	Tipperary
5	Ollie O'Connor	Kilkenny	0-11	6	Dublin
6	Seán Daly	Waterford	1-07	10	Cork
6	Chris McGrath	Wexford	1-07	10	Kilkenny
8	Eddie Cullen	Wexford	2-03	9	Laois
8	John Quinlan	Cork	1-06	9	Waterford
8	Brian Cunningham	Galway	0-09	9	Tipperary
