= 1973 All-Ireland Intermediate Hurling Championship =

Championship Details
- Dates: 22 April – 16 September 1973
- Teams: 9

All Ireland Champions
- Winners: Kilkenny (1st win)
- Captain: Paddy Grace

All Ireland Runners-up
- Runners-up: London

Provincial Champions
- Munster: Kerry
- Leinster: Kilkenny
- Ulster: Antrim
- Connacht: Not Played

Championship Statistics
- Matches Played: 9
- Total Goals: 61 (6.77 per game)
- Total Points: 153 (17.00 per game)
- Top Scorer: Shem Muldowney (6-11)

The 1973 All-Ireland Intermediate Hurling Championship was the 13th staging of the All-Ireland Intermediate Hurling Championship since its establishment by the Gaelic Athletic Association in 1961. The championship ran from 22 April to 16 September 1973.

Tipperary were the defending champions, however, they declined to field a team.

The All-Ireland final was played at Walsh Park in Waterford on 16 September 1973 between Kilkenny and London, in what was their first ever meeting in the final. Kilkenny won the match by 5-15 to 2-09 to claim their first ever All-Ireland title.

Kilkenny's Shem Muldowney was the championship's top scorer with 6-11.

== Leinster Intermediate Hurling Championship ==
=== Leinster quarter-final ===
| 22 April 1973 Quarter-final | Meath | 8-09 - 2-09 | Carlow | Parnell Park |
| | R Melia 4-0, TJ Reilly 2-2, M Mullan 1-2, V Grey 1-1, S Kearney 0-2, F McCann 0-1. | | J Mitchell 1-4, T Kelly 1-0, P O'Neill 0-1, P Kehoe 0-1, D Dunne 0-1, O Hynes 0-1, T Foley 0-1. |

=== Leinster smei-finals ===
| 6 May 1973 Semi-final | Meath | 2-13 - 1-13 | Dublin | St. Loman's Park |
| | S Kearney 0-6, F McCann 1-2, TJ Reilly 1-0, M Mullen 0-2, M Garrigan 0-1, P Curley 0-1, R Melia 0-1. | | E Kealy 1-3, P Maycock 0-4, J Finnegan 0-2, E Hudson 0-2, G Ryan 0-1, J Kenny 0-1. |

| 20 May 1973 Semi-final | Laois | 5-06 - 9-04 | Kilkenny | O'Moore Park |
| | N Wall 2-0, M O'Brien 1-2, P Kavanagh 1-2, R Maloney 1-0, J Cummins 0-1, L O'Shaughnessy 0-1. | | J Walsh 4-0, F Cleere 3-0, J O'Connor 1-3, S Muldowney 1-0, R Dunne 0-1. |

=== Leinster final ===
| 29 July 1973 Final | Kilkenny | 11-15 - 1-03 | Meath | Croke Park |
| | S Muldowney 3-5, P Holden 3-4, F Cleere 2-0, P Walsh 1-2, L Ryan 1-1, J Walsh 1-0, S McGarry 0-2, J Dunne 0-1. | | S Carney 1-0, T Reilly 0-1, F McCann 0-1, B McGuey 0-1. |

== Ulster Intermediate Hurling Championship ==
=== Ulster final ===
| 19 August 1973 Final | Antrim | 3-11 - 1-06 | Down | Pearse Park |
| | E Donnelly 1-3, M Loughrey 1-1, B McGarry 1-0, D McAuley 0-3, M McKillop 0-3, S Collins 0-1. | | B Gilmour 1-2, M O'Flynn 0-2, L Clarke 0-1, P Braniff 0-1. |

== All-Ireland Intermediate Hurling Championship ==
=== All-Ireland semi-finals ===
| 26 August 1973 Semi-final | Kerry | 2-06 - 3-06 | London | Austin Stack Park |
| | T Kenny 0-4, F Thornton 1-0, J O'Sullivan 1-0, J O'Grady 0-1, T Nolan 0-1. | | D McCarthy 2-0, D Hallissey 1-2, C Danagher 0-2, S Coughlan 0-1, D O'Sullivan 0-1. |

| 26 August 1973 Semi-final | Kilkenny | 5-18 - 1-10 | Antrim | Nowlan Park |
| | F Cleere 2-2, S O'Connor 0-7, S Muldowney 1-2, S McGarry 1-2, J Walsh 1-0, P Kavanagh 0-2, R Bourke 0-2, P Holden 0-1. | | E Donnelly 1-6, M McKillop 0-2, S Collins 0-1, S O'Neill 0-1. |

=== All-Ireland final ===
| 16 September 1973 Final | Kilkenny | 5-15 - 2-09 | London | Walsh Park |
| | J Walsh 2-1, S Muldowney 1-4, F Cleere 1-1, J O'Connor 0-4, J Doyle 1-0, P Holden 0-2, D Burke 0-1, P Kavanagh 0-1, T Murphy 0-1. | | C Danagher 2-0, D Hallissey 0-6, P Fahy 0-2, F Birrane 0-1. | Referee: S O'Grady (Limerick) |

== Championship statistics ==
=== Top scorers ===
Top scorers overall

| Rank | Player | County | Tally | Total | Matches | Average |
|---|---|---|---|---|---|---|
| 1 | Shem Muldowney | Kilkenny | 6-11 | 29 | 4 | 7.25 |
| 2 | Frank Cleere | Kilkenny | 8-03 | 27 | 4 | 6.75 |
| 3 | Jim Walsh | Kilkenny | 8-01 | 25 | 4 | 6.25 |
| 4 | Jack O'Connor | Kilkenny | 1-14 | 17 | 3 | 5.66 |
| 5 | Pat Holden | Kilkenny | 3-07 | 16 | 3 | 5.33 |
| 6 | Eddie Donnelly | Antrim | 2-09 | 15 | 2 | 7.50 |
| 7 | Richard Melia | Meath | 4-01 | 13 | 2 | 6.50 |
| 8 | T. J. Reilly | Meath | 3-03 | 12 | 3 | 4.00 |
| 9 | Dinny Hallissey | London | 1-08 | 11 | 2 | 5.50 |
| 9 | Séamus Kearney | Meath | 1-08 | 11 | 3 | 3.66 |

In a single game

| Rank | Player | County | Tally | Total | Opposition |
|---|---|---|---|---|---|
| 1 | Shem Muldowney | Kilkenny | 3-05 | 14 | Meath |
| 2 | Pat Holden | Kilkenny | 3-04 | 13 | Meath |
| 3 | Richard Melia | Meath | 4-00 | 12 | Carlow |
| 3 | Jim Walsh | Kilkenny | 4-00 | 12 | Laois |
| 5 | Frank Cleere | Kilkenny | 3-00 | 9 | Laois |
| 6 | Eddie Donnelly | Antrim | 1-06 | 9 | Kilkenny |
| 7 | T. J. Reilly | Meath | 2-02 | 8 | Carlow |
| 7 | Frank Cleere | Kilkenny | 2-02 | 8 | Antrim |
| 9 | Jim Walsh | Kilkenny | 2-01 | 7 | London |
| 9 | Shem Muldowney | Kilkenny | 1-04 | 7 | London |
| 9 | John Mitchell | Carlow | 1-04 | 7 | Meath |
| 9 | Jack O'Connor | Kilkenny | 0-07 | 7 | Antrim |
