= 1998 All-Ireland Intermediate Hurling Championship =

Championship Details
- Dates: 31 May – 10 October 1998
- Teams: 18

All Ireland Champions
- Winners: Limerick (1st win)
- Captain: John Cormican
- Manager: Frank Costelloe

All Ireland Runners-up
- Runners-up: Kilkenny
- Captain: Paddy Farrell
- Manager: Noel Skehan

Provincial Champions
- Munster: Limerick
- Leinster: Kilkenny
- Ulster: Down
- Connacht: Galway

Championship Statistics
- Matches Played: 20
- Total Goals: 69 (3.45 per game)
- Total Points: 523 (26.15 per game)
- Top Scorer: Andrew Ryan (2-39)

The 1998 All-Ireland Intermediate Hurling Championship was the 15th staging of the All-Ireland Intermediate Hurling Championship since its establishment by the Gaelic Athletic Association in 1961. The championship ran from 31 May to 10 October 1998.

Cork entered the championship as the defending champions; however, they were beaten by Limerick in the Munster quarter-final.

The All-Ireland final was played at Semple Stadium in Thurles on 10 October 1998 between Limerick and Kilkenny, in what was their first ever championship meeting. Limerick won the match by 4–16 to 2–17 to claim their first ever All-Ireland title.

Limerick's Andrew Ryan was the championship's top scorer with 2–39.

== Connacht Intermediate Hurling Championship ==
=== Connacht final ===
18 July 1998 Final	Roscommon	1-11 - 2-22	Galway	Dr. Hyde Park
	T Galvin 1-2, J Mannion 0-4, B Boyle 0-2, M Cunniffe 0-2, A Kelly 0-1.		R Duane 0-7, M Connolly 0-7, B Larkin 1-3, N Kenny 1-2, R Burke 0-1, D Curley 0-1, F Healy 0-1.

== Leinster Intermediate Hurling Championship ==
=== Leinster quarter-finals ===
13 June 1998 Quarter-final	Kildare	0-08 - 4-30	Kilkenny	St. Conleth's Park
	T Carew 0-3, T Spain 0-3, J Brennan 0-1, N Casey 0-1.		H Shefflin 0-10, R Shortall 1-3, D Maher 1-2, T Shefflin 1-2, P Treacy 1-2, B Barcoe 0-4, PJ Cody 0-3, A Cleere 0-2, J Bolger 0-2.

20 June 1998 Quarter-final	Dublin	0-07 - 2-15	Wexford	Parnell Park
	D Lawlor 0-3, C Quigley 0-2, L Bergin 0-2.		E Cullen 1-8, J Cooper 1-0, C McGrath 0-3, S Ryan 0-2, J Bolger 0-2.

20 June 1998 Quarter-final	Carlow	0-07 - 0-07	Wicklow	Dr. Cullen Park
	P Coady 0-3, D Kavanagh 0-2, B Murphy 0-2.		J Keogh 0-4, T McGrath 0-1, J O'Toole 0-1, S Cody 0-1.

20 June 1998 Quarter-final	Meath	4-05 - 6-15	Westmeath	St. Loman's Park
	R Dorran 2-1, G O'Neill 2-0, G Cole 0-2, T Reilly 0-1, N Horan 0-1.		S McLoughlin 2-5, R Galvin 1-2, K Kennedy 1-1, J Gavigan 1-1, B Kennedy 1-1, P Clarke 0-2, P Connaughton 0-2, P Williams 0-1.

27 June 1998 Quarter-final replay	Wicklow	0-20 - 1-08	Carlow	Aughrim County Ground
	D Hyland 0-9, J Keogh 0-3, T McGrath 0-2, D Doyle 0-1, C O'Toole 0-1, D Curran 0-1, S O'Loughlin 0-1, J O'Toole 0-1, T Collins 0-1.		B Murphy 1-2, D Kavanagh 0-2, K Griffin 0-2, P Coady 0-1, M Galvin 0-1.

=== Leinster semi-finals ===
4 July 1998 Semi-final	Westmeath	3-11 - 2-14	Wexford	Cusack Park
	B Kennedy 2-1, F O'Farrell 0-5, R Galvin 1-1, S McLoughlin 0-2, J Gavigan 0-1, A Devine 0-1.		E Cullen 0-5, S Ryan 1-1, J Bolger 1-0, S Hughes 0-3, C McGrath 0-2, F Parker 0-1, O Bolger 0-1, S Greene 0-1.

11 July 1998 Semi-final	Wicklow	1-08 - 3-23	Kilkenny	Aughrim County Ground
	C Byrne 1-0, J Keogh 0-3, T McGrath 0-1, T Collins 0-1, D Hyland 0-1, S Cody 0-1, A Fagan 0-1.		H Shefflin 0-8, A Cleere 1-4, B Barcoe 1-2, T Shefflin 1-1, R Shortall 0-4, B Phelan 0-1, J Bolger 0-1, R Moran 0-1, P Treacy 0-1.

18 July 1998 Semi-final replay	Wexford	3-14 - 0-11	Westmeath	Dr. Cullen Park
	C McGrath 1-2, J Bolger 1-1, E Cullen 0-4, S Ryan 0-4, S Bennett 1-0, S Hughes 0-2, F Parker 0-1.		A Mitchell 0-4, S McLoughlin 0-3, P Clarke 0-2, R Galvin 0-1, F Farrell 0-1.

=== Leinsterinal ===
29 July 1998 Final	Kilkenny	3-13 - 0-11	Wexford	St. Patrick's Park
	H Shefflin 1-4, T Shefflin 1-1, B Barcoe 1-0, R Shortall 0-2, J Bolger 0-2, A Cleere 0-2, P Treacy 0-1, R Moore 0-1.		C McGrath 0-5, S Ryan 0-5, E Cullen 0-1.

== Munster Intermediate Hurling Championship ==
=== Munster quarter-finals ===
31 May 1998 Quarter-final	Limerick	0-12 - 0-10	Cork	Gaelic Grounds
	A Ryan 0-3, D Murphy 0-3, J Butler 0-2, C O'Brien 0-1, P Keyes 0-1, J Cormican 0-1, G Galvin 0-1.		C Buckley 0-2, J O'Dwyer 0-2, J Nyhan 0-2, D O'Donoghue 0-2, B Coleman 0-1, M Walsh 0-1.	Referee: M Wadding (Waterford)

7 June 1998 Quarter-final	Tipperary	0-25 - 0-05	Waterford	Páirc Uí Chaoimh
	K McCormack 0-6, D Browne 0-4, K Maguire 0-4, D Corcoran 0-4, S O'Meara 0-3, A Doyle 0-2, E Corcoran 0-1, S McKeogh 0-1.		O Atkins 0-3, A Lannon 0-1, A Robinson 0-1.

=== Munster semi-finals ===
21 June 1998 Semi-final	Limerick	0-17 - 0-07	Clare	Semple Stadium
	A Ryan 0-9, O O'Neill 0-4, J Cormican 0-2, M O'Brien 0-1, P Keyes 0-1.		D Considine 0-3, E Flynn 0-2, A Markham 0-1, C Dillon 0-1.	Referee: B Dunne (Kerry)

1 July 1998 Semi-final	Tipperary	2-21 - 3-13	Kerry	Gaelic Grounds
	K McCormack 2-7, D Browne 0-8, D Corcoran 0-3, A Doyle 0-1, S O'Meara 0-1, J McGrath 0-1.		JM Dooley 2-2, M Slattery 0-4, B O'Sullivan 0-4, I Maunsell 1-0, P Cronin 0-1, C Walshe 0-1.

=== Munster final ===
24 July 1998 Final	Limerick	2-11 - 0-15	Tipperary	Gaelic Grounds
	P Neenan 2-1, A Ryan 0-5, J Cormican 0-3, D Carroll 0-1, D Murphy 0-1.		D Browne 0-5, A Doyle 0-5, K McCormack 0-3, S McKeogh 0-1, T Hogan 0-1.	Referee: L O'Flynn (Cork)

== Ulster Intermediate Hurling Championship ==
=== Ulster final ===
26 July 1998 Final	Down	3-11 - 2-12	London	Casement Park
	B Coulter 2-0, J McGrattan 0-5, G Gordon 1-0, MT Coulter 0-2, T McMahon 0-2, M Coulter 0-1, M Braniff 0-1.		R Murphy 0-7, D Spellman 2-0, S Slattery 0-1, P McManus 0-1, P Linnane 0-1, F Monaghan 0-1, S Tooher 0-1.

== All-Ireland Intermediate Hurling Championship ==
=== All-Ireland semi-finals ===
5 September 1998 Semi-final	Kilkenny	2-12 - 2-11	Galway	O'Connor Park
	H Shefflin 1-3, T Shefflin 1-0, D Maher 0-2, B Phelan 0-2, R Shortall 0-2, J Bolger 0-1, A Cleere 0-1, B Barcoe 0-1.		M Connolly 1-4, B Larkin 1-1, N Kenny 0-3, R Gantley 0-1, R Duane 0-1, F Healy 0-1.	Referee: G Devlin (Armagh)

6 September 1998 Semi-final	Limerick	1-17 - 3-11	Down	Parnell Park
	S Ryan 1-7, M O'Brien 0-3, D Carroll 0-2, D Murphy 0-1, P Cahill 0-1, O O'Neill 0-1, J Butler 0-1, P Neenan 0-1.		M Braniff 2-1, J McGrattan 0-7, N Sands 1-1, M Coulter jnr 0-1, G Savage 0-1.	Referee: E Morris (Dublin)

20 September 1998 Semi-final replay	Limerick	4-13 - 5-07	Down	O'Toole Park
	O O'Neill 3-1, A Ryan 0-6, P Neenan 1-1, J Butler 0-2, M O'Brien 0-1, D Murphy 0-1, D Carroll 0-1.		M Braniff 2-0, G McGrattan 2-0, J McGrattan 0-6, G Savage 1-0, M Coulter 0-1.	Referee: E Morris (Dublin)

=== All-Ireland final ===
10 October 1998 Final	Limerick	4-16 - 2-17	Kilkenny	Semple Stadium
	A Ryan 1-9, O O'Neill 2-2, J Butler 1-1, J Cormican 0-2, P Neenan 0-1, M O'Brien 0-1.		H Shefflin 1-6, O O'Connor 1-1, B Phelan 0-3, D Maher 0-3, A Cleere 0-2, T Shefflin 0-1, R Shortall 0-1.	Referee: J Cooney (Galway)

== Championship statistics ==
=== Top scorers ===
Overall

Rank	Player	Team	Tally	Total	Matches	Average
1	Andrew Ryan	Limerick	2-39	45	6	7.50
2	Henry Shefflin	Kilkenny	3-31	40	5	8.00
3	Owen O'Neill	Limerick	5-08	23	5	4.60
4	Kevin McCormack	Tipperary	2-16	22	3	7.33
5	Eddie Cullen	Wexford	1-18	21	4	5.25
6	Johnny McGrattan	Down	0-18	18	3	6.00
7	Tommy Shefflin	Kilkenny	4-05	17	5	3.40
7	Declan Browne	Tipperary	0-17	17	3	5.66
9	Seán McLoughlin	Westmeath	2-10	16	3	5.33
10	Chris McGrath	Wexford	1-12	15	4	3.75
10	Robert Shortall	Kilkenny	1-12	15	4	3.75

In a single game

Rank	Player	County	Tally	Total	Opposition
1	Kevin McCormack	Tipperary	2-07	13	Kerry
2	Andrew Ryan	Limerick	1-09	12	Kilkenny
3	Seán McLoughlin	Westmeath	2-05	11	Meath
3	Eddie Cullen	Wexford	1-08	11	Westmeath
5	Owen O'Neill	Limerick	3-01	10	Down
5	Andrew Ryan	Limerick	1-07	10	Down
5	Henry Shefflin	Kilkenny	0-10	10	Kildare
8	Henry Shefflin	Kilkenny	1-06	9	Limerick
8	Don Hyland	Wicklow	0-09	9	Carlow
8	Andrew Ryan	Limerick	0-09	9	Clare
