= 2000 All-Ireland Intermediate Hurling Championship =

Hurling championship

Championship Details
- Dates: 28 May – 23 September 2000
- Teams: 12

All Ireland Champions
- Winners: Tipperary (5th win)
- Captain: Declan Corcoran
- Manager: Brendan Bonnar

All Ireland Runners-up
- Runners-up: Galway
- Manager: Josie Harte

Provincial Champions
- Munster: Tipperary
- Leinster: Kilkenny
- Ulster: Not Played
- Connacht: Not Played

Championship Statistics
- Matches Played: 13
- Total Goals: 40 (3.07 per game)
- Total Points: 336 (25.07 per game)
- Top Scorer: Declan Browne (6-47)

The 2000 All-Ireland Intermediate Hurling Championship was the 17th staging of the All-Ireland Intermediate Hurling Championship since its establishment by the Gaelic Athletic Association in 1961. The championship ran from 28 May to 23 September 2000.

Galway entered the championship as the defending champions.

The All-Ireland final was played at the Gaelic Grounds in Limerick on 30 August 2000 between Tipperary and Galway, in what was their first meeting in the final in 28 years. Tipperary won the match by 2-17 to 1-10 to claim a fifth All-Ireland title overall and a first title in 28 years.

Tipperary's Declan Browne was the championship's top scorer with 6-47.

== Leinster Intermediate Hurling Championship ==
=== Leinster quarter-final ===
10 June 2000 Quarter-final	Kilkenny	1-15 - 0-10	Laois	Nowlan Park
	O Behan 1-7, J Barron 0-2, M Gordan 0-2, B Phelan 0-1, JP Corcoran 0-1, G Walsh 0-1, D Lynch 0-1		B Keenan 0-5, E Meagher 0-3, M Dunphy 0-1, J Dollard 0-1

=== Leinster semi-finals ===
1 July 2000 Semi-final	Wexford	2-18 - 0-07	Dublin

1 July 2000 Semi-final	Kilkenny	0-18 - 3-09	Offaly	Nowlan Park
	O O'Connor 0-6, J Barron 0-4, M Gordon 0-3, O Behan 0-2, D Lyng 0-2, B Joyce 0-1.		D Murray 1-6, D Pilkington 1-0, J Guinan 1-0, W Comerford 0-2, P McLoughlin 0-1.

19 July 2000 Semi-final replay	Offaly	1-08 - 2-13	Kilkenny	St. Brendan's Park
	A Mannion 0-4, J Guinan 1-0, P McLoughlin 0-1, P Molloy 0-1, D Pilkington 0-1, D Murray 0-1.		O O'Connor 0-5, M Gordon 1-1, J Young 1-1, J Barron 0-2, J Drea 0-1, S Kelly 0-1, G Walsh 0-1, D Lyng 0-1.

=== Leinster final ===
29 July 2000 Final	Kilkenny	2-12 - 1-13	Wexford	Nowlan Park
	O O'Connor 0-7, J Young 1-0, M Gordon 1-0, O Behan 0-3, G Walsh 0-1, D Lyng 0-1.		O O'Connor 0-4, P Carley 1-0, M Jacob 0-3, MJ Reck 0-2, C Byrne 0-2, E Cullen 0-1, P Redmond 0-1.

== Munster Intermediate Hurling Championship ==
=== Munster quarter-final ===
28 May 2000 Quarter-final	Tipperary	4-17 - 3-09	Waterford	Páirc Uí Chaoimh
	D Browne 4-12, C Morrissey 0-3, P Maguire 0-1, S O'Meara 0-1.		S Daly 1-1, S Barron 1-1, S Cunningham 1-0, B Hannon 0-3, J Fitzgerald 0-1, B Hanley 0-1, A Fitzgerald 0-1.

=== Munster semi-finals ===
4 June 2000 Semi-final	Cork	1-11 - 1-11	Limerick	Semple Stadium
	J Kingston 1-2, J O'Callaghan 0-3, D O'Donoghue 0-2, R Dwane 0-1, S O'Farrell 0-1, G O'Donovan 0-1, D Moher 0-1.		A Ryan 0-6, O O'Neill 1-1, G Galvin 0-2, P Neenan 0-1, D Murphy 0-1.

11 June 2000 Semi-final	Tipperary	3-12 - 2-05	Clare	Páirc Uí Chaoimh
	D Browne 0-8, R Killeen 1-1, D Corcoran 1-0, S Maher 1-0, S O'Meara 0-1, C Morrissey 0-1, P Maguire 0-1.		G O'Donnell 1-1, J Punch 1-0, S Ryan 0-2, C Early 0-2.

12 June 2000 Semi-final replay	Cork	4-14 - 1-13	Limerick	Páirc Uí Chaoimh
	J O'Callaghan 1-6, S Farrell 2-0, D Moher 0-4, J Kingston 1-0, R Dwane 0-2, D O'Donoghue 0-2.		P Coleman 1-0, O O'Neill 0-3, D Murphy 0-2, P Neenan 0-2, T McLoughlin 0-2, A Ryan 0-2, B Tobin 0-1, D Carroll 0-1.

=== Munster final ===
2 August 2000 Final	Tipperary	1-19 - 0-15	Cork	Semple Stadium
	D Browne 1-10, D O'Connor 0-3, P Maguire 0-2, C Morrissey 0-2, D Corcoran 0-1, S Maher 0-1.		D Moher 0-5, J O'Callaghan 0-4, M Daly 0-3, A O'Connor 0-1, R Dwane 0-1, J Kingston 0-1.

== All-Ireland Intermediate Hurling Championship ==
=== All-Ireland semi-finals ===
26 August 2000 Semi-final	Tipperary	1-14 - 2-09	Meath	O'Moore Park
	D Corcoran 1-3, D Browne 0-6, P Maguire 0-2, R Killeen 0-1, C Morrissey 0-1, D Gleeson 0-1.		N Horan 1-3, N Reilly 1-1, F McMahon 0-2, P Donnelly 0-2, D Reilly 0-1.

2 September 2000 Semi-final	Galway	1-15 - 1-12	Kilkenny	St. Brendan's Park
	B Cunningham 0-10, M Greaney 1-0, M Fahy 0-2, J Cummins 0-1, M Headd 0-1, J Conroy 0-1.		O O'Connor 1-3, D Lyng 0-4, G Walsh 0-2, E Behan 0-2, A Barry 0-1.

=== All-Ireland final ===
23 September 2000 Final	Tipperary	2-17 - 1-10	Galway	Gaelic Grounds
	D Browne 1-11, R Killeen 1-0, D Corcoran 0-3, D O'Connor 0-3.	Report	B Cunningham 1-4, M Greaney 0-2, J Cummins 0-1, M Headd 0-1, K Carr 0-1, E Hyland 0-1.	Referee: Tommy McIntyre (Antrim)

== Championship statistics ==
=== Top scorers ===
Overall

Rank	Player	Team	Tally	Total	Matches	Average
1	Declan Browne	Tipperary	6-47	65	5	13.00
2	Ollie O'Connor	Kilkenny	1-21	24	4	6.00
3	Brian Cunningham	Galway	1-14	17	2	8.50
3	Owen Behan	Kilkenny	1-14	17	5	3.40
5	Jonathan O'Callaghan	Cork	1-13	16	3	5.33

=== Miscellaneous ===
- Tipperary's Declan Browne set a number of scoring records in the Munster Championship. His 4-12 against Waterford became the highest personal tally ever recorded by a player in a match. Browne's overall tally of 5-30 during the three games was also the highest score ever recorded by a player in a single Munster Championship campaign. He also overtook Kerry's Declan Lovett to become the top scorer in the history of the Munster Championship.
