= Munster Intermediate Hurling Championship =

Hurling competition in Ireland

- Irish: Craobh Iomána Idirmheánach na Mumhan
- Code: Hurling
- Founded: 1961
- Abolished: 2017
- Region: Munster (GAA)
- Trophy: Sweet Afton Cup
- No. of teams: 5-7
- Last Title holders: Clare (2nd title)
- First winner: Tipperary
- Most titles: Cork (15 titles)
- Official website: Official website

The Munster Intermediate Hurling Championship was an annual inter-county hurling competition organised by the Munster Council of the Gaelic Athletic Association (GAA) between 1961 and 2017. Teams consisted of senior, intermediate and junior club players who were not members of their county's senior panel. The competition was established to prevent the stronger counties from dominating the existing Munster Junior Hurling Championship.

The final, frequently held in July, served as the culmination of a series of games played during the early summer months, often as curtain raisers to Munster SHC games, with the results determining which team received the Sweet Afton Cup. The championship was always played on a straight knockout basis whereby once a team lost they were eliminated from the championship.

The Munster Championship was an integral part of the wider All-Ireland Intermediate Hurling Championship. The winners of the Munster final, like their counterparts in the Leinster Championship, advanced directly to the latter stages of the All-Ireland series of games.

Seven teams have competed at various times since the inception of the Munster Championship. The title has been won at least once by all seven teams, five of whom have won the title more than once. Cork were the most successful team with 15 titles. Clare were the last winners of the title before its abolition.

== Format ==
The Munster Championship is a knockout tournament with pairings drawn at random – there are no seeds.

Each match is played as a single leg. If a match is drawn there is extra time and, if the sides still remain level, a second period of extra time is played.

The format has remained the same since the very first Munster Championship in 1961. An open draw is made in which three of the five teams automatically qualify for the semi-final stage of the competition. Two other teams play in a lone quarter-final with the winner joining the other three teams at the semi-final stage. Once a team is defeated they are eliminated from the championship.

The Munster Championship has wider implications for the All-Ireland Intermediate Hurling Championship. The winners of the Munster final automatically qualify for the latter stages of the All-Ireland series of games. Unlike the final runners-up in the minor and senior championships, there is no 'back-door system' at intermediate level.

Five of the six counties of Munster – Clare, Cork, Limerick, Tipperary and Waterford – participate in the championship. Kerry, the sixth county in the province, contested the Munster Championship until recently. Galway took part in the competition in the 1960s.

== Teams ==
=== Eligible teams ===
The championship is currently suspended but six counties would be eligible for the championship:

| County | Qualification | Location | Stadium | Province | Championship Titles | Last Championship Title |
|---|---|---|---|---|---|---|
| Clare | Intermediate development team | Ennis | Cusack Park | Munster | 2 | 2016 |
| Cork | Intermediate development team | Cork | Páirc Uí Chaoimh | Munster | 15 | 2015 |
| Kerry | Joe McDonagh Cup team | Tralee | Austin Stack Park | Munster | 2 | 1973 |
| Limerick | Intermediate development team | Limerick | Gaelic Grounds | Munster | 3 | 2008 |
| Tipperary | Intermediate development team | Thurles | Semple Stadium | Munster | 9 | 2013 |
| Waterford | Intermediate development team | Waterford | Walsh Park | Munster | 1 | 2007 |

== Trophies ==
At the end of the Munster final, the winning team is presented with a trophy. The cup, named the Sweet Afton Cup, is held by the winning team until the following year's final. Traditionally, the presentation is made at a special rostrum in the stand where GAA dignitaries and special guests view the match.

The cup is decorated with ribbons in the colours of the winning team. During the game the cup actually has both teams' sets of ribbons attached and the runners-up ribbons are removed before the presentation. The winning captain accepts the cup on behalf of his team before giving a short speech. Individual members of the winning team then have an opportunity to come to the rostrum to lift the cup.

The present trophy was presented by Tipperary man Jerry Shelly in 1961 to commemorate the new competition.

== Roll of honour ==
| County | Title(s) | Runners-up | Years won | Years runner-up |
|---|---|---|---|---|
| Cork | 15 | 6 | 1964, 1965, 1967, 1969, 1997, 1999, 2001, 2003, 2004, 2005, 2006, 2009, 2010, 2014, 2015 | 1961, 1962, 1968, 1970, 2000, 2013 |
| Tipperary | 9 | 7 | 1961, 1963, 1966, 1971, 1972, 2000, 2002, 2012, 2013 | 1998, 1999, 2004, 2005, 2006, 2008, 2014 |
| Limerick | 3 | 7 | 1968, 1998, 2008 | 1967, 1971, 1997, 2007, 2011, 2015, 2016 |
| Clare | 2 | 3 | 2011, 2016 | 1963, 2001, 2012 |
| Kerry | 2 | 1 | 1970, 1973 | 1972 |
| Waterford | 1 | 5 | 2007 | 1965, 2002, 2003, 2009, 2010 |
| Galway | 1 | 3 | 1962 | 1964, 1966, 1969 |

== Team records and statistics ==
=== Biggest Munster final wins ===
- The most one sided Munster finals:
  - 24 points – 1963: Tipperary 6–10 (28) – (4) 0–4 Clare
  - 21 points – 2009: Cork 5–24 (39) – (18) 3–9 Waterford
  - 20 points – 1969: Cork 4–14 (26) – (6) 0–6 Galway
  - 13 points – 2014: Cork 4–15 (27) – (14) 2–8 Tipperary
  - 12 points – 1964: Cork 4–13 (25) – (13) 1–10 Galway
  - 12 points – 2007: Waterford 5–12 (27) – (15) 1–12 Limerick

=== Miscellaneous ===
- Cork hold the record for the longest streak of success in finals. They won four championships in-a-row between 2003 and 2006.
- Tipperary hold the record for the longest streak of defeated in finals. They lost three championship deciders in-a-row between 2004 and 2006.
- Cork hold the record for the most consecutive appearances in Munster finals. They played in four-in-a-row on two separate occasions, firstly between 1967 and 1970, and most recently between 2003 and 2006.
- Two counties have completed the Munster intermediate and senior double in the same year:
  - Cork in 1969, 1999, 2003, 2005, 2006
  - Tipperary in 1961, 1971
  - Waterford in 2007
- Cork is the only county to have completed the Munster minor, under-21, intermediate and senior 'grand slam' in the same year. This was achieved in 1969 and again in 2005.
- Only one player has captained his county to Munster titles in both the intermediate and senior grades:
  - Pat Mulcahy captained Cork to the intermediate title in 1997 and the senior title in 2006.

== List of Munster Finals ==
| All-Ireland champions |
| All-Ireland runners-up |

| Year | Winners | Score | Runners-up | Score |
|---|---|---|---|---|
| 1961 | Tipperary | 3–10 (19) | Cork | 2–12 (18) |
| 1962 | Galway | 5–04 (19) | Cork | 4–06 (18) |
| 1963 | Tipperary | 6–10 (28) | Clare | 0–04 (4) |
| 1964 | Cork | 4–13 (25) | Galway | 1–10 (13) |
| 1965 | Cork | 1–15 (18) | Waterford | 3–02 (11) |
| 1966 | Tipperary | 4–02 (14) | Galway | 1–07 (10) |
| 1967 | Cork | 5–14 (29) | Limerick | 2–12 (18) |
| 1968 | Limerick | 3–08 (17) | Cork | 1–06 (9) |
| 1969 | Cork | 4–14 (26) | Galway | 0–06 (6) |
| 1970 | Kerry | 2–13 (19) | Cork | 2–10 (16) |
| 1971 | Tipperary | 1–11 (14) | Limerick | 2–04 (10) |
| 1972 | Tipperary | 4–16 (28) | Kerry | 3–12 (21) |
| 1973 | Kerry | Unopposed | | |
| 1974–96 | No championship | | | |
| 1997 | Cork | 1–15 (28) | Limerick | 1–12 (21) |
| 1998 | Limerick | 2–11 (17) | Tipperary | 0–15 (15) |
| 1999 | Cork | 2–09 (15) | Tipperary | 1–07 (10) |
| 2000 | Tipperary | 1–19 (22) | Cork | 0–15 (15) |
| 2001 | Cork | 1–20 (23) | Clare | 1–11 (14) |
| 2002 | Tipperary | 4–08 (20) | Waterford | 2–07 (13) |
| 2003 | Cork | 2–12 (18) | Waterford | 0–11 (11) |
| 2004 | Cork | 0–18 (18) | Tipperary | 1–09 (12) |
| 2005 | Cork | 2–17 (23) | Tipperary | 2–11 (17) |
| 2006 | Cork | 2–18 (24) | Tipperary | 2–13 (19) |
| 2007 | Waterford | 5–12 (27) | Limerick | 1–12 (15) |
| 2008 | Limerick | 2–16 (22) | Tipperary | 2–12 (18) |
| 2009 | Cork | 5–24 (39) | Waterford | 3–09 (18) |
| 2010 | Cork | 0–15 (15) | Waterford | 0–13 (13) |
| 2011 | Clare | 2–15 (21) | Limerick | 2–13 (19) |
| 2012 | Tipperary | 1–18 (21) | Clare | 0–17 (17) |
| 2013 | Tipperary | 0–19 (19) | Cork | 0–18 (18) |
| 2014 | Cork | 4–15 (27) | Tipperary | 2–08 (14) |
| 2015 | Cork | 0–20 (20) | Limerick | 0–18 (18) |
| 2016 | Clare | 1–26 (29) | Limerick | 2–18 (24) |
| 2017 | Cork | Unopposed | | |

== Records and statistics ==
=== Top scorers ===
==== All time ====
| Rank | Name | Team | Goals | Points | Total |
|---|---|---|---|---|---|
| 1 | Declan Browne | Tipperary | 5 | 52 | 67 |
| 2 | Declan Lovett | Kerry | 9 | 29 | 56 |
| 3 | Jonathan O'Callaghan | Cork | 2 | 49 | 55 |
| 4 | Peter O'Brien | Cork | 0 | 47 | 47 |
| 5 | Milo Keane | Clare | 11 | 13 | 46 |
| 6 | Ronan O'Brien | Tipperary | 3 | 33 | 42 |
| 7 | Eoin Conway | Cork | 3 | 32 | 41 |
| 8 | Maurice O'Sullivan | Cork | 4 | 28 | 40 |
| 9 | Willie Griffin | Limerick | 2 | 30 | 36 |
| 10 | Tom Larkin | Tipperary | 9 | 07 | 34 |

==== By year ====
| Year | Top scorer | Team | Score | Total |
|---|---|---|---|---|
| 1961 | Ray Sisk | Cork | 7-03 | 24 |
| 1962 | Vincent Barrett | Cork | 3-18 | 27 |
| 1963 | Milo Keane | Clare | 4-09 | 21 |
| 1964 | Justin McCarthy | Cork | 2-08 | 14 |
| 1965 | Seán Devlin | Galway | 5-04 | 19 |
| 1966 | Andy Dunworth | Limerick | 4-03 | 15 |
| 1967 | Jerry O'Connell | Cork | 6-03 | 21 |
| 1968 | Martin Linanne | Clare | 5-00 | 15 |
| 1968 | Charlie McCarthy | Cork | 1-12 | 15 |
| 1969 | Séamus Gillen | Cork | 3-12 | 21 |
| 1970 | Seánie Barry | Cork | 2-13 | 19 |
| 1971 | Declan Lovett | Kerry | 2-12 | 18 |
| 1972 | John Darcy | Tipperary | 4-01 | 13 |
| 1997 | Maurice Roche | Limerick | 1-17 | 20 |
| 1998 | Kevin McCormack | Tipperary | 2-16 | 22 |
| 1999 | Seán O'Meara | Tipperary | 0-12 | 12 |
| 2000 | Declan Browne | Tipperary | 5-30 | 45 |
| 2001 | Jonathan O'Callaghan | Cork | 1-20 | 23 |
| 2002 | Brendan Hogan | Tipperary | 2-15 | 21 |
| 2003 | Tom Moylan | Tipperary | 2-08 | 14 |
| 2004 | Éamonn Taaffe | Clare | 3-09 | 18 |
| 2005 | Maurice O'Sullivan | Cork | 0-18 | 18 |
| 2006 | Ronan O'Brien | Tipperary | 2-11 | 17 |
| 2007 | Shane Casey | Waterford | 4-05 | 17 |
| 2008 | Seán Chaplin | Clare | 0-13 | 13 |
| 2009 | Maurice O'Sullivan | Cork | 4-05 | 17 |
| 2010 | Eoin Conway | Cork | 1-25 | 28 |
| 2011 | Niall Gilligan | Clare | 1-11 | 14 |
| 2012 | Kieran Morris | Tipperary | 0-19 | 19 |
| 2013 | Peter O'Brien | Cork | 0-19 | 19 |
| 2014 | Peter O'Brien | Cork | 0-25 | 25 |
| 2015 | Willie Griffin | Limerick | 2-16 | 22 |
| 2016 | Aidan McCormack | Tipperary | 0-19 | 19 |

==== In a single game ====
| Year | Top scorer | Team | Score | Total |
|---|---|---|---|---|
| 1961 | Ray Sisk | Cork | 5-00 | 15 |
| 1962 | Vincent Barrett | Cork | 3-03 | 12 |
| 1963 | Richie Browne | Cork | 3-04 | 13 |
| 1964 | Johnny Culloty | Kerry | 1-07 | 10 |
| 1965 | Seán Devlin | Galway | 3-02 | 11 |
| 1966 | Andy Dunworth | Limerick | 4-03 | 15 |
| 1967 | Jerry O'Connell | Cork | 3-02 | 11 |
| 1967 | Jim McGrath | Cork | 3-02 | 11 |
| 1968 | Martin Linnane | Clare | 4-00 | 12 |
| 1969 | Séamus Gillen | Cork | 2-10 | 16 |
| 1970 | Seánie Barry | Cork | 2-07 | 13 |
| 1971 | Declan Lovett | Kerry | 1-07 | 10 |
| 1972 | Matt Ryan | Tipperary | 2-04 | 10 |
| 1997 | Maurice Roche | Limerick | 1-07 | 10 |
| 1997 | Jimmy Smiddy | Cork | 0-10 | 10 |
| 1998 | Kevin McCormack | Tipperary | 2-07 | 13 |
| 1999 | Seán O'Meara | Tipperary | 0-09 | 9 |
| 2000 | Declan Browne | Tipperary | 4-12 | 24 |
| 2001 | Jonathan O'Callaghan | Cork | 1-11 | 14 |
| 2002 | Brendan Hogan | Tipperary | 1-10 | 13 |
| 2003 | David Clancy | Limerick | 2-01 | 7 |
| 2003 | John Quinlan | Cork | 2-01 | 7 |
| 2003 | Tom Moylan | Tipperary | 1-04 | 7 |
| 2003 | Tom Moylan | Tipperary | 1-04 | 7 |
| 2003 | Jonathan O'Callaghan | Cork | 0-07 | 7 |
| 2004 | Éamonn Taaffe | Clare | 2-03 | 9 |
| 2004 | Éamonn Taaffe | Clare | 1-06 | 9 |
| 2004 | Darren Dineen | Cork | 0-09 | 9 |
| 2005 | Mark Keane | Limerick | 1-08 | 11 |
| 2006 | John Anthony Moran | Limerick | 2-04 | 10 |
| 2007 | Shane Casey | Waterford | 3-05 | 14 |
| 2008 | Noel Hogan | Tipperary | 2-05 | 11 |
| 2009 | Pa Kearney | Waterford | 3-01 | 10 |
| 2009 | Leigh Desmond | Cork | 1-07 | 10 |
| 2010 | Eoin Conway | Cork | 1-12 | 15 |
| 2011 | Stephen Power | Waterford | 1-06 | 9 |
| 2012 | Adrian Mannix | Cork | 0-09 | 9 |
| 2013 | Peter O'Brien | Cork | 0-12 | 12 |
| 2014 | Peter O'Brien | Cork | 1-10 | 13 |
| 2014 | Bobby Duggan | Clare | 0-13 | 13 |
| 2015 | Willie Griffin | Limerick | 2-06 | 12 |
| 2016 | Aidan McCormack | Tipperary | 0-14 | 14 |

== See also ==
- Leinster Intermediate Hurling Championship
- Connacht Intermediate Hurling Championship
- Ulster Intermediate Hurling Championship

== Sources ==
- Roll of Honour on www.gaainfo.com
