= Growler =

Growler may refer to:

== Places ==
- Growler Mine Area, Arizona, United States

== People ==
- "Growler" (calypsonian), Trinidad and Tobago calypsonian singer Errol Duke, also "The Mighty Growler"
- "The Growler", a nickname for Irish hurler Sean Daly

=== Fictional characters ===
- Growler, a house robot in Robot Wars
- Growler, a unit type in VOR: The Maelstrom
- Officer Growler, a character from The Getalong Gang

== Groups, organizations, companies ==
- The Growlers, an American band
- Growler Manufacturing and Engineering, an American manufacturing firm
- Kalamazoo Growlers, a collegiate summer baseball team
- Newfoundland Growlers, a minor league ice hockey team
- Growlr, a dating app owned by The Meet Group

== Technology ==
- Growler (electrical device), a device for testing electric motors
- Growler, a sound-powered telephone used on U.S. Navy ships
- S-400 missile system or SA-21 Growler, a surface-to-air missile

== Vehicles ==
- M1161 Growler, a military light ground vehicle
- Avro Shackleton, a military aircraft of the RAF and the South African Air Force
- Boeing EA-18G Growler, an electronic warfare jet fighter
- British Rail Class 37 or growler, a diesel locomotive
- Clarence (carriage) or growler
- Growler-E, a 2011 concept car by Vizualtech that evolved into the Lyonheart K sports car
- USS Growler, several ships and submarines of the United States Navy

== Other uses ==
- Growler (jug), a type of large beer bottle
- Growler, a Yorkshire pork pie
- Growler, a small iceberg or piece of drift ice that is barely visible above the surface of the water
- Largemouth bass, "growler" in US dialect, the fish two USN submarines were named after

== See also ==
- Growl (disambiguation)
