= 2003 All-Ireland Intermediate Hurling Championship =

Championship Details
- Dates: 18 May – 30 August 2003
- Teams: 11

All Ireland Champions
- Winners: Cork (4th win)
- Captain: Brendan Lombard
- Manager: Seán O'Brien

All Ireland Runners-up
- Runners-up: Kilkenny
- Captain: Aidan Lawlor
- Manager: Maurice Power

Provincial Champions
- Munster: Cork
- Leinster: Kilkenny
- Ulster: Not Played
- Connacht: Not Played

Championship Statistics
- Matches Played: 10
- Total Goals: 35 (3.50 per game)
- Total Points: 283 (28.30 per game)
- Top Scorer: Jonathan O'Callaghan (0-29)

The 2003 All-Ireland Intermediate Hurling Championship was the 20th staging of the All-Ireland Intermediate Hurling Championship since its establishment by the Gaelic Athletic Association in 1961. The championship ran from 18 May to 30 August 2003.

Galway entered the championship as the defending champions, however, they were beaten by Cork in the All-Ireland semi-final.

The All-Ireland final was played at Semple Stadium in Thurles on 30 August 2003 between Cork and Kilkenny, in what was their first ever meeting in the final. Cork won the match by 1-21 to 0-23, after extra time, to claim a fourth championship title overall and a first title in two years.

Cork's Jonathan O'Callaghan as the championship's top scorer with 0-29.

== Leinster Intermediate Hurling Championship ==
=== Leinster quarter-final ===
4 June 2003 Quarter-final	Wexford	3-18 - 0-11	Laois	Wexford Park
	D Mythen 2-5, PJ Carley 0-5, N Sheil 1-1, J O'Connor 0-3, G Laffan 0-1, P Finn 0-1, R Murphy 0-1, D Lyng 0-1.		D Russell 0-6, C Brophy 0-2, T Fennelly 0-2, S Dwyer 0-1, B Keenan 0-1.

=== Leinster semi-finals ===
18 June 2003 Semi-final	Offaly	1-08 - 1-19	Dublin	St. Brendan's Park
	W Comerford 1-1, A Hanrahan 0-4, D Tanner 0-1, N Murphy 0-1, M Corcoran 0-1.		D Curtin 0-7, E Carroll 1-2, N Murphy 0-2, A Breathnach 0-2, E Patterson 0-1, D Daly 0-1, R Brennan 0-1, R Potts 0-1, D Sweeney 0-1, D Owens 0-1.

18 June 2003 Semi-final	Kilkenny	3-14 - 1-09	Wexford	Nowlan Park
	D Mackey 2-3, N Maloney 1-0, J Power 0-3, P Sheehan 0-3, A Fogarty 0-2, P Maher 0-2, J O'Neill 0-1.		M Byrne 1-3, N Higgins 0-2, D Mythern 0-2, A O'Leary 0-1, K Furlong 0-1.

=== Leinster final ===
9 July 2003 Final	Kilkenny	4-20 - 1-10	Dublin	O'Moore Park
	P Sheehan 1-4, J Power 0-5, N Moloney 1-1, A Fogarty 1-1, N Doherty 1-1, P Maher 0-3, G Byrne 0-2, D Mackey 0-2, A Murphy 0-1.		E Carroll 1-3, D Curtin 0-5, D Owens 0-1, E Duane 0-1.

== Munster Intermediate Hurling Championship ==
=== Quarter-finals ===
18 May 2003 Munster quarter-final	Tipperary	3-19 - 1-05	Clare	Páirc Uí Chaoimh
	T Moylan 1-4, T Scroope 1-1, K Nealon 1-1, S Everard 0-3, R O'Brien 0-3, E Ryan 0-2, H Moloney 0-1, T Slevin 0-1, B Hogan 0-1, L O'Connor 0-1, S McGrath 0-1.		J Punch 1-3, Brian O'Donnell 0-1, C Egan 0-1.	Referee: K Healy (Cork)

=== Munster semi-finals ===
1 June 2003 Semi-final	Waterford	2-11 - 2-09	Limerick	Semple Stadium
	S Daly 1-3, Andrew Kirwan 1-1, K Stafford 0-3, T Reid 0-2, N Dunphy 0-2.		D Clancy 2-1, N O'Riordan 0-2, M Clancy 0-2, T McLoughlin 0-1, D O'Grady 0-1, A O'Connor 0-1, P Sheehan 0-1.

8 June 2003 Semi-final	Tipperary	1-14 - 3-16	Cork	Semple Stadium
	T Moylan 1-4, K Nealon 0-2, B Hogan 0-2, E Ryan 0-1, T Scroope 0-1, T Slevin 0-1, S Everard 0-1, T Connors 0-1, L O'Connor 0-1.		J Quinlan 2-1, J O'Callaghan 0-6, V Morrissey 1-2, B Coleman 0-2, R Dwyer 0-2, S Hayes 0-1, D O'Riordan 0-1, J Hughes 0-1.	Referee: P Moore (Waterford)

=== Munster final ===
16 July 2003 Final	Cork	2-12 - 0-11	Waterford	Leahy Park
	J O'Callaghan 0-7; B Coleman 1-2; D O'Riordan 1-1; S Hayes 0-1; J Quinlan 0-1.		S Daly 0-5; B Phelan 0-2; J O'Connor 0-1; D Howard 0-1; O Bennett 0-1, T Kirwin 0-1.	Referee: S Roche (Tipperary)

== All-Ireland Intermediate Hurling Championship ==
=== All-Ireland semi-final ===
20 August 2003 Semi-final	Cork	5-23 - 1-10	Galway	Semple Stadium
	J O'Callaghan 0-8, D O'Riordan 2-1, R Dwyer 1-4, B Coleman 1-3, V Morrissey 1-1, J Quinlan 0-3, J Murphy 0-1, E Conway 0-1, D Moher 0-1.		C Dervan 1-4, S Diviney 0-2, F McCarthy 0-2, K Hayes 0-1, N Kelly 0-1.

=== All-Ireland final ===
30 August 2003 Final	Cork	1-21 - 0-23 (aet)	Kilkenny	Semple Stadium
	J O'Callaghan 0-8, B Coleman 0-4, D O'Riordan 1-0, J Quinlan 0-3, J Barrett 0-2, V Morrissey 0-2, J Hughes 0-1, J Murphy 0-1.		J Power 0-5, D Lawlor 0-4, A Fogarty 0-3, J Maher 0-2, D Mackey 0-2, J O'Neill 0-1, P Buggy 0-1, P Maher 0-1, N Moloney 0-1, E Walsh 0-1, P Sheehan 0-1, JP Corcoran 0-1.	Referee: T McIntyre (Antrim)

== Championship statistics ==
=== Top scorers ===
Overall

Rank	Player	Club	Tally	Total	Matches	Average
1	Jonathan O'Callaghan	Cork	0-29	29	4	7.25
2	Brendan Coleman	Cork	2-11	17	4	4.25
3	Diarmuid O'Riordan	Cork	4-03	15	4	3.75
4	Tom Moylan	Tipperary	2-08	14	3	4.66
4	John Quinlan	Cork	2-08	14	4	3.50
6	Diarmuid Mackey	Kilkenny	2-07	13	3	4.33
6	Des Mythen	Wexford	2-07	13	2	6.50
6	Jamie Power	Kilkenny	0-13	13	3	4.33
9	David Curtin	Dublin	0-12	12	2	6.00
10	Vincent Morrissey	Cork	2-05	11	4	2.75
10	Emmett Carroll	Dublin	2-05	11	2	5.50
10	Seán Daly	Waterford	1-08	11	2	5.50
10	Paul Sheehan	Kilkenny	1-08	11	3	3.33

In a single game

Rank	Player	Club	Tally	Total	Opposition
1	Des Mythen	Wexford	2-05	8	Laois
2	Diarmuid Mackey	Kilkenny	2-03	9	Wexford
3	Jonathan O'Callaghan	Cork	0-08	8	Galway
3	Jonathan O'Callaghan	Cork	0-08	8	Kilkenny
5	David Clancy	Limerick	2-01	7	Waterford
5	John Quinlan	Cork	2-01	7	Tipperary
5	Diarmuid O'Riordan	Cork	2-01	7	Galway
5	Paul Sheehan	Kilkenny	1-04	7	Dublin
5	Tom Moylan	Tipperary	1-04	7	Clare
5	Tom Moylan	Tipperary	1-04	7	Cork
5	Rory Dwyer	Cork	1-04	7	Galway
5	Cathal Dervan	Galway	1-04	7	Cork
5	Jonathan O'Callaghan	Cork	0-07	7	Waterford
5	David Curtin	Dublin	0-07	7	Offaly
