= A Pox on the Pioneers =

Studio album by Andrew Weatherall
- Released: 21 September 2009
- Genre: Electronic; rock
- Length: 44:17
- Label: Rotters Golf Club
- Producer: Andrew Weatherall

Andrew Weatherall chronology
A Pox on the Pioneers (2009)	Convenanza (2016)

A Pox on the Pioneers is the debut solo studio album by Andrew Weatherall. It was released through Rotters Golf Club on 21 September 2009.

== Critical reception ==
Professional ratings
Aggregate scores
Source	Rating
AnyDecentMusic?	6.6/10
Review scores
Source	Rating
Fact	6/10
The Independent	favorable
The List	3/5 stars
NME	7/10
The Quietus	favorable
Record Collector	4/5 stars

David Pollock of The List wrote, "With Weatherall himself singing as if from the heart of a smoke-filled room (and perhaps he was), the album explores dancehall, ambient dub, electro and post-punk in building an atmospheric soundtrack for the city at night." Iain Moffat of The Quietus called it "the most song-based work of his career." Meanwhile, Louise Brailey of Fact commented that "A Pox on the Pioneers is an idiosyncratic and surprising debut at best – I expected something more."

Clash placed it at number 9 on the "Top 40 Albums of 2009" list.

== Track listing ==
All tracks are written by Andrew Weatherall and Steve Boardman, except where noted

No.	Title	Writer(s)	Length
1.	"Fail We May, Sail We Must"		3:54
2.	"Privately Electrified"		5:35
3.	"Miss Rule"		3:35
4.	"Selective Walking"		4:11
5.	"Liar with Wings"		3:55
6.	"Let's Do the 7 Again"		3:41
7.	"A Pox on the Pioneers"	Weatherall; Boardman; Chris Mackin	4:15
8.	"All the Little Things (That Make Life Worth Living)"		4:54
9.	"Built Back Higher"	Weatherall; Boardman; Keith Tenniswood	3:56
10.	"Walk of Shame"		6:25
Total length:			44:17

Expanded edition bonus tracks
No.	Title	Length
11.	"Stalker"	3:04
12.	"Fall We May, Dub We Must"	6:29
Total length:		53:55

== Personnel ==
Credits adapted from liner notes.

- Andrew Weatherall – vocals, keyboards, drums, percussion
- Steve Boardman – programming, keyboards, drums, percussion
- Chris Mackin – guitar, bass guitar, backing vocals
- Tim Fairplay – guitar, bass guitar
- Chris Harris – guitar
- Keith Tenniswood – guitar (9)
- Bobby Gillespie – backing vocals
- Sophie Braithewaite – backing vocals
- Luke Mclean – artwork
