= From the Double Gone Chapel =

Studio album by Two Lone Swordsmen
- Released: 17 May 2004
- Studio: The Rotters Golf Club
- Genre: Electronic rock; dance-punk; post-punk; electroclash; IDM
- Length: 53:42
- Label: Warp
- Producer: Andrew Weatherall; Keith Tenniswood

Two Lone Swordsmen chronology
Tiny Reminders (2000)	From the Double Gone Chapel (2004)	Wrong Meeting (2007)

Singles from From the Double Gone Chapel
- 1. "Sex Beat" Released: 26 July 2004

From the Double Gone Chapel is a studio album by Two Lone Swordsmen. It was released through Warp on 17 May 2004. The album's title derives from a pub in East End of London. The album includes a cover of the Gun Club's "Sex Beat". The album peaked at number 19 on the UK Independent Albums Chart.

== Critical reception ==
Professional ratings
Aggregate scores
Source	Rating
Metacritic	69/100
Review scores
Source	Rating
AllMusic	3/5 stars
The Guardian	4/5 stars
Pitchfork	7.9/10
Stylus Magazine	A

At Metacritic, which assigns a weighted average score out of 100 to reviews from mainstream critics, the album received an average score of 69, based on 13 reviews, indicating "generally favorable reviews".

Heather Phares of AllMusic gave the album 3 out of 5 stars, writing, "Even if the sound they pursue here is just a detour, its seamless and creative fusion of rock and electronic idioms deserves respect." Dan Lett of Pitchfork gave the album a 7.9 out of 10, commenting that "The contrasting styles don't always sit comfortably, but individual tracks sparkle with creativity and the newfound dark side is a surprisingly pleasant fit." Dorian Lynskey of The Guardian gave the album 4 out of 5 stars and called it "the duo's most arresting album yet, introducing live instruments, songwriting and Weatherall's own deadpan vocals to their murky electronic brew."

In 2014, NME placed it at number 64 on the "101 Albums to Hear Before You Die" list.

== Track listing ==
All tracks are written by Andrew Weatherall and Keith Tenniswood, except "Sex Beat" written by Jeffrey Lee Pierce

No.	Title	Length
1.	"Stack Up"	2:52
2.	"Faux"	4:18
3.	"Formica Fuego"	4:57
4.	"The Lurch"	3:58
5.	"Sex Beat"	4:02
6.	"Damp"	4:17
7.	"Punches and Knives"	4:04
8.	"The Valve"	4:46
9.	"Kamanda's Response"	4:42
10.	"Sick When We Kiss"	5:01
11.	"Taste of Our Flames"	5:40
12.	"Driving with My Gears in Reverse (Only Makes You Move Further Away)"	5:05

== Personnel ==
Credits adapted from liner notes.

- Andrew Weatherall – production, mixing
- Keith Tenniswood – production, mixing
- Lung – additional guitar (1), artwork
- Richard Thair – drums (1, 11)
- Nick Burton – guest appearance (3, 4, 5, 7, 12)
- Gordon Mills – guest appearance (6)
- Wildcat Will – guest appearance (9)
- Nina Walsh – vocals (11)
- Moonus – keyboards (12)
- Noel Summerville – mastering

== Charts ==
Chart (2004)	Peak position
UK Independent Albums (OCC)	19
