= Shane Carley =

Irish hurler (born 1974)

Personal information
- Native name: Seán Mac Fhearaile (Irish)
- Born: 1972 (age 53–54) Barntown, County Wexford, Ireland

Sport
- Sport: Hurling
- Position: Centre-back
Club
- Years: Club
- Glynn–Barntown
Club titles
	Football	Hurling
Wexford titles	1	0
Inter-county
- Years: County
- 1995-1998: Wexford
Inter-county titles
- Leinster titles: 2
- All-Irelands: 1
- NHL: 0
- All Stars: 0

Shane Carley (born 1974) is an Irish hurling manager, selector and former player. At club level, he played with Glynn–Barntown and at inter-county level was a member of the Wexford senior hurling team.

== Playing career ==
Carley first played for the Glynn–Barntown club in the juvenile and underage grades as a dual player. He won Wexford U21HC and U21FC titles in 1993 and 1994, by which stage he had progressed to adult level. Carley won a Wexford SFC medal in 1996, following Glynn–Barntown's 2–03 to 0–07 defeat of Kilanerin in the final.

On the inter-county scene, Carley first appeared with Wexford as part of the minor team in 1992. He later progressed to the under-21 team. Carely made his senior team debut in the National Hurling League in October 1995. He later won consecutive Leinster SHC medals as a substitute, as well as an All-Ireland SHC medal as a substitute following Wexford's defeat of Limerick in 1996. Carley dropped back to the intermediate team shortly after and won a Leinster IHC medal in 2001, before losing the subsequent All-Ireland intermediate final to Cork.

== Coaching career ==
In retirement from playing, Carley became involved in team management and coaching at club and inter-county levels. He has served as a selector at minor, under-21 and intermediate levels with Wexford, while he was also Wexford's under-21 hurling team manager for a period. Carley has also served as manager of the Glynn–Barntown and Ballyboden St Enda's senior hurling teams.

== Honours ==
Glynn–Barntown

- Wexford Senior Football Championship: 1996

Wexford

- All-Ireland Senior Hurling Championship: 1996
- Leinster Senior Hurling Championship: 1996, 1997
- Leinster Intermediate Hurling Championship: 2001
