= Brendan Coleman =

Irish hurler and selector (born 1976)

Personal information
- Native name: Breandán Ó Colmáin (Irish)
- Born: 1976 (age 49–50) Youghal, County Cork, Ireland
- Occupation: Project manager
- Height: 6 ft 0 in (183 cm)

Sport
- Sport: Hurling
- Position: Centre-forward
Clubs
- Years: Club
- 1994-2014 1997-2008: Youghal → Imokilly
Club titles
- Cork titles: 2
College
- Years: College
- 1994-1999: University of Limerick
College titles
- Fitzgibbon titles: 0
Inter-county*
Years	County	Apps (scores)
1998-2000	Cork	1 (0-02)
Inter-county titles
- Munster titles: 1
- All-Irelands: 1
- NHL: 0
- All Stars: 0
- *Inter County team apps and scores correct as of 11:57, 5 October 2019.

Brendan Coleman (born 1976) is an Irish hurling selector and former player. He is a selector with the Cork senior hurling team, having previously played for the team. Coleman also played with club team Youghal and divisional side Imokilly.

== Early life ==
Coleman was born and raised in Youghal, County Cork. Educated locally, he later studied at the University of Limerick and was part of their Fitzgibbon Cup panel on a number of occasions.

== Club career ==
Coleman began his club career at juvenile and underage levels as a dual player with the Youghal club, before progressing to adult level. It was as a Gaelic footballer that he claimed his first silverware when, in 1999, he won a Cork JAFC medal from centre-back in the 3–07 to 1–12 defeat of Ilen Rovers in the final. This was followed by a second consecutive promotion the following year, when Coleman collected a Cork IFC medal after a one-point replay defeat of Nemo Rangers.

As a hurler, Coleman earned selection to the Imokilly divisional team and won a Cork SHC medal in 1999, after coming on as a substitute in the 1–18 to 2–12 win over Sarsfields in the final. He claimed a second successive medal a year later, when Imokilly retained the title with a five-point win over Blackrock in the final.

Coleman was at the end of his club career when he won a Cork PIHC as a substitute after an 0–11 to 0–10 defeat of Castlelyons in the final. He later added a Munster Club IHC title to his collection after coming on as a substitute in the three-point win over Ballina.

== Inter-county career ==
Coleman never played for Cork at minor level but was called up to the under-21 team in his final year of eligibility in 1997. He came on as a substitute to win a Munster U21HC medal that year, before later claiming an All-Ireland U21HC medal after again coming on as a substitute in the 2–11 to 0–13 win over Galway in the 1997 All-Ireland U21HC final.

Coleman immediately progressed to the intermediate team in 1998, as well as being on the outskirts of the senior team. He won the first of three Munster IHC medals in 1999, while he was also a member of the senior team's extended panel for their win over Kilkenny in the 1999 All-Ireland final. Coleman made his National Hurling League debut in March 2000 and was part of the panel when Cork claimed a second successive Munster SHC medal that year.

Success at club level resulted in Coleman being called up to Cork's junior football team as a centre-forward in 2001. A 0–17 to 0–11 defeat of Tipperary gave him a Munster JFC medal, while he later claimed an All-Ireland JFC medal after the 1–15 to 3–07 win over Mayo in the All-Ireland JFC final. Coleman added an All-Ireland IHC medal to his collection after scoring four points in the 1-21 to 0-23 win over Kilkenny in the 2003 All-Ireland IHC final.

== Management career ==
Coleman became a selector with the Cork under-20 hurling team in October 2019. His tenure as part of Pat Ryan's management team saw Cork win back-to-back All-Ireland U20HC medals after respective defeats of Dublin in 2020 and Galway in 2021. Coleman became a selector with the Cork senior team in August 2022, again serving under the management of Pat Ryan. After being a selector for Cork's 3–29 to 1–34 extra-time defeat by Clare in the 2024 All-Ireland final, he was part of the management team that guided Cork to National Hurling League and Munster SHC honours in 2025.

== Honours ==
=== Player ===
Youghal

- Munster Intermediate Club Hurling Championship: 2013
- Cork Premier Intermediate Hurling Championship: 2013
- Cork Intermediate Football Championship: 2000
- Cork Junior A Football Championship: 1999
- East Cork Junior A Football Championship: 1999

Imokilly

- Cork Senior Hurling Championship: 1997, 1998

Cork

- All-Ireland Senior Hurling Championship: 1999
- Munster Senior Hurling Championship: 2000
- All-Ireland Intermediate Hurling Championship: 2003
- Munster Intermediate Hurling Championship: 1999, 2003, 2005
- All-Ireland Junior Football Championship: 2001
- Munster Junior Football Championship: 2001
- All-Ireland Under-21 Hurling Championship: 1997
- Munster Under-21 Hurling Championship: 1997

=== Management ===
Cork

- Munster Senior Hurling Championship: 2025
- National Hurling League: 2025
- All-Ireland Under-20 Hurling Championship: 2020, 2021
- Munster Under-20 Hurling Championship: 2020, 2021
