= Growl =

Growling is a low, guttural vocalization produced by predatory animals; producing growls.

Growling or growl may also refer to:

== Sounds ==
- Death growl, the dominant singing style in death metal music
- Stomach growl, or borborygmus, noise produced by movement of the contents of the gastro-intestinal tract
- Growling (wind instruments) a wind instrument (for example, saxophone) technique

== Other uses ==
- Growl (software), a global notifications system for Mac OS X and Microsoft Windows
- Growl (video game), a 1991 arcade game
- Growl (album), a 2008 album by Radioactive Man
- "Growl" (song), a 2013 song by South Korean–Chinese boy band Exo
- "Growl", song by Johnny Kidd And The Pirates 1959

== See also ==
- Growler (disambiguation)
