= Tommy Kehoe =

Irish hurler

Personal information
- Native name: Tomás Mac Eochaidh (Irish)
- Born: 1973 (age 52–53) Barntown, County Wexford, Ireland

Sport
- Sport: Hurling
- Position: Midfield
Club
- Years: Club
- Glynn–Barntown
Club titles
	Football	Hurling
Wexford titles	1	0
Inter-county
- Years: County
- 1993-1998: Wexford
Inter-county titles
- Leinster titles: 2
- All-Irelands: 1
- NHL: 0
- All Stars: 0

Thomas Kehoe (born 1973) is an Irish former hurler. At club level, he played with Glynn–Barntown and at inter-county level was a member of the Wexford senior hurling team.

== Career ==
Kehoe first played for the Glynn–Barntown club in the juvenile and underage grades as a dual player. He won Wexford U21HC and U21FC titles in 1993 and 1994, by which stage he had progressed to adult level. Kehoe won a Wexford SFC medal in 1996, following Glynn–Barntown's 2–03 to 0–07 defeat of Kilanerin in the final.

On the inter-county scene, Kehoe first appeared with Wexford as part of the under-21 team. He made his senior team debut in the National Hurling League in 1993 and quickly became a regular member of the starting fifteen. Kehoe later won consecutive Leinster SHC medals as a substitute, as well as an All-Ireland SHC medal as a substitute following Wexford's defeat of Limerick in 1996.

== Honours ==
Glynn–Barntown

- Wexford Senior Football Championship: 1996

Wexford

- All-Ireland Senior Hurling Championship: 1996
- Leinster Senior Hurling Championship: 1996, 1997
