= Come Together (Primal Scream song) =

Single by Primal Scream

from the album Screamadelica
- Released: August 1990
- Genre: Dance-rock; gospel-house; psychedelia
- Length: 10:21 (album version); 4:23 (7" Farley single edit); 8:05 (12" Farley mix)
- Label: Creation; Sire
- Songwriters: Bobby Gillespie; Andrew Innes; Robert Young
- Producer: Andrew Weatherall

Primal Scream singles chronology
"Loaded" (1990)	"Come Together" (1990)	"Higher Than the Sun" (1991)

"Come Together" is a song by Scottish rock band Primal Scream, released in August 1990 as the second single from their third studio album Screamadelica (1991). The song peaked at number 26 on the UK Singles Chart. The single versions of the song, mixed by Terry Farley, are radically different from the album version which was mixed by Andrew Weatherall. Whilst the Farley mix follows a standard pop song structure, Weatherall's extended album mix is more influenced by house music and dub mixes and features none of Bobby Gillespie's vocals. In the US, the single was released as a double A-side with the band's previous single "Loaded".

A shorter edit of the song was featured on the 1997 soundtrack compilation Trainspotting #2: Music from the Motion Picture, Vol. 2.

In 2013, a remix of the song was produced by Daniel Avery and was signed by British television network BT Sport to provide the theme tune for coverage of the Barclays Premier League and other live events.

== Track listing ==
All tracks written by Bobby Gillespie, Andrew Innes and Robert Young except where noted.

UK 7" vinyl / cassette (Creation)

1. "Come Together (7" Farley Mix)" – 4:23
2. "Come Together (7" Weatherall Mix)" – 4:45

UK 12" vinyl (Creation)

1. "Come Together (12" Farley Mix)" – 8:02
2. "Come Together (12" Weatherall Mix)" – 10:12

UK CD (Creation)

1. "Come Together (7" Farley Mix)" – 4:23
2. "Come Together (12" Weatherall Mix)" – 10:12

US 12" vinyl / CD (Sire)

1. "Come Together (7" Farley Mix)" – 4:23
2. "Loaded (7" Mix)" – 4:15
3. "Come Together (12" Farley Mix)" – 8:02
4. "Loaded (12" Mix)" – 7:01
5. "I'm Losing More Than I'll Ever Have" – 4:33
6. "Ramblin' Rose (Live NYC)" (Fred Burch, Marijohn Wilkin) – 2:25
7. "Loaded (Farley Mix) – 5:56

== Charts ==
Chart (1990)	Peak position
UK Singles (Official Charts)	26
US Alternative Airplay (Billboard)	13
