= This Film's Crap Let's Slash the Seats =

Studio album by David Holmes
- Released: 1995
- Length: 77:28
- Label: Go! Discs
- Producer: David Holmes, Jagz Kooner, Gary Burns

David Holmes chronology
This Film's Crap Let's Slash the Seats (1995)	Let's Get Killed (1997)

This Film's Crap Let's Slash the Seats is the debut studio album by David Holmes, released in 1995. It was reissued in the US with a bonus CD of remixes and B-sides in 1998. "No Man's Land", "Minus 61 in Detroit" and "Gone" were released as singles.

== Critical reception ==
Professional ratings
Review scores
Source	Rating
AllMusic	3/5 stars
Muzik	3/5 stars

The Daily Telegraph wrote: "Combining state-of-the-art rhythm sequences with 32mm atmospherics, Holmes has dragged the techno-album into previously uncharted waters of competence, variety and, occasionally, outright terror."

== Track listing ==
1. "No Man's Land" – 12:45
2. "Slash the Seats" – 7:17
3. "Shake Ya Brain" – 9:14
4. "Got Fucked Up Along the Way" – 8:16
5. "Gone" (featuring Sarah Cracknell) – 8:09
6. "The Atom and You" – 6:40
7. "Minus 61 in Detroit" – 9:21
8. "Inspired by Leyburn" – 8:02
9. "Coming Home to the Sun" – 7:44

Bonus disc

1. "Gone (First Night Without Charge)" (featuring Sarah Cracknell) (remix by Two Lone Swordsmen) – 9:59
2. "Gone (The Kruder & Dorfmeister Session TM)" (featuring Sarah Cracknell) (remix by Kruder & Dorfmeister) – 7:51
3. "Mosh It" – 6:13
4. "Slash the Seats (Slash the Beats)" (B-side to "No Man's Land") – 6:40
5. "The Connecting Flight Syndrome" (B-side "Minus 61 in Detroit") – 7:40
6. "Smoked Oak" (B-side to "No Man's Land") – 7:33
7. "Gone (Alter Ego Decoding Gone Part 2)" (featuring Sarah Cracknell) (remix by Alter Ego) – 5:42
8. "Gone (Second Night Without Charge)" (featuring Sarah Cracknell) (remix by Two Lone Swordsmen) – 8:37
