= Let's Get Killed =

Studio album by David Holmes
- Released: 8 September 1997
- Genres: Electronic; trip hop; instrumental hip hop; alternative dance
- Length: 59:45
- Label: Go! Beat
- Producers: David Holmes, Jagz Kooner, Gary Burns, Keith Tenniswood, Richie Fermie, Tim Goldsworthy

David Holmes chronology
This Film's Crap Let's Slash the Seats (1995)	Let's Get Killed (1997)	Bow Down to the Exit Sign (2000)

Singles from Let's Get Killed
- 1. "Gritty Shaker" Released: 4 August 1997; 2. "Don't Die Just Yet" Released: 5 January 1998; 3. "My Mate Paul" Released: 23 March 1998

Let's Get Killed is the second studio album by Belfast electronica DJ and producer David Holmes. It was released in the UK on 8 September 1997 through Go! Beat Records and contained two UK Top 40 singles: "Don't Die Just Yet" and "My Mate Paul"; "Gritty Shaker" was also released as a single. In addition, the album includes a re-working of the James Bond theme, retitled as "Radio 7", and a remake of Serge Gainsbourg's songs "Melody" and "Cargo Culte", retitled "Don't Die Just Yet".

Let's Get Killed was Holmes's first album release in the United States, following the domestic acclaim of his debut long-player This Film's Crap Let's Slash the Seats.

== Background ==
Holmes grew up in Belfast, Northern Ireland as the youngest of ten children. By the age of 15 he had begun to DJ in his local pubs and bars, playing soul, jazz, rock and disco. This eclecticism would remain into adulthood, and is a feature of his DJ sets. When he was 17, Holmes visited New York City, spending time in the South Bronx, Washington Square and Central Park areas. He took a DAT recorder with him as he explored the city, and taped conversations with many people he spoke to. Holmes kept the recordings for over ten years, using them as the basis for Let's Get Killed.

Let's Get Killed is so called because on one occasion Holmes and his associates were "... chased by eight guys through the South Bronx who were after our expensive audio equipment".

== Music ==
Holmes used the recordings he made in New York City of conversations and other street-level noise as samples on the album. These snippets of conversation were often spoken by people from New York's cultural underbelly, including prostitutes, pimps and drug-dealers. The samples were used in between the tracks on the album, and in some cases in the tracks themselves.

The record contains a wide variety of styles within the electronica spectrum, including techno, breakbeats, trip hop and drum 'n' bass. David Holmes has produced many film scores, and it has often been said that his studio albums have a cinematic feel to them.

== Critical reception ==
Professional ratings
Review scores
Source	Rating
AllMusic	3/5 stars
The Encyclopedia of Popular Music	4/5 stars
Entertainment Weekly	A−
Houston Chronicle	4/5 stars
Los Angeles Times	3/4 stars
Muzik	10/10
NME	7/10
Rolling Stone	3/5 stars
Spin	8/10
Uncut	4/5 stars

Let's Get Killed was well received by critics in general, and the dance music press in particular. Both Jockey Slut and Mixmag awarded it Album of the Month, whilst DJ Magazine gave it a rating of 10/10.

The NME said, "Holmes both evokes the endless possibilities, claustrophobia and madness of The Big Apple and offers a critique ... Not bad at all for a trendy DJ", and placed it number 40 in the 1997 Critics Poll. Melody Maker also included it in their end-of-year poll, this time at number 24.

AllMusic said that the "effect created is like that of a soundtrack, and even though Let's Get Killed isn't attached to a film, it flows with energy and grace". Entertainment Weekly rated the album A-minus, saying "Holmes loves airy cinematic beauty, but he tempers it with frisky Latin percussion, gritty electric guitar ... , sound-collage effects, and snippets of crazed street people.".

On the strength of the album, Holmes won Best Rock Artist at Ireland's National Entertainment Awards, the first time it was awarded to a dance artist. Let's Get Killed was also included in the book 1001 Albums You Must Hear Before You Die.

== Chart performance ==
Let's Get Killed spent two weeks in the UK Albums Chart, entering at number 34 in its first week. It dropped to number 75 in its second and final week in the chart.

== Track listing ==
All tracks written by David Holmes, unless otherwise stated.

1. "Listen" – 0:49
2. "My Mate Paul" – 5:29
3. "Let's Get Killed" – 7:28
4. "Gritty Shaker" – 6:40
5. "Head Rush on Lafayette" – 1:20
6. "Rodney Yates" – 6:24
7. "Radio 7" (Monty Norman) – 5:49
8. "The Parcus & Madder Show" – 0:51
9. "Slashers Revenge" – 4:46
10. "Freaknik" – 6:45
11. "Caddell Returns" – 5:42
12. "Don't Die Just Yet" (Serge Gainsbourg) – 6:43
13. "For You" – 0:59

== Personnel ==
David Holmes wrote and produced the majority of the album, apart from "Radio 7", which is a cover of Monty Norman's James Bond Theme, and "Don't Die Just Yet", which is based on samples of songs by Serge Gainsbourg. Other appearances and credits were:

- Gem Archer – guitar on "Radio 7" and "Freaknik". Archer would later join Oasis.
- London Session Orchestra – "Radio 7" and "Don't Die Just Yet".
- Jagz Kooner – production on "My Mate Paul".
- Keith Tenniswood – guitar/vibraphone on "Rodney Yates"; additional production on "Gritty Shaker", "Rodney Yates" and "Slasher's Revenge".
- Tim Goldsworthy – remixing on "Radio 7".

== Singles ==
Year	Single	Chart	Position
1997	"Gritty Shaker"	—	—
1998	"Don't Die Just Yet"	UK Top 40	33
1998	"My Mate Paul"	UK Top 40	39
