= Bow Down to the Exit Sign =

Studio album by David Holmes
- Released: June 2000
- Length: 54:00
- Label: Go! Beat
- Producer: David Holmes

David Holmes chronology
Let's Get Killed (1997)	Bow Down to the Exit Sign (2000)	David Holmes Presents the Free Association (2002)

Bow Down to the Exit Sign is the third studio album by David Holmes, released in 2000. It features contributions from Bobby Gillespie, Sean Gullette, Jon Spencer, Martina Topley-Bird and Carl Hancock Rux. The song "69 Police" features during the closing scene of the 2001 remake of Ocean's Eleven, and was included in the soundtrack.

== Reception ==
Professional ratings
Aggregate scores
Source	Rating
Metacritic	84/100
Review scores
Source	Rating
AllMusic	4.5/5 stars
Alternative Press	4/5
Entertainment Weekly	A
The Guardian	5/5 stars
Los Angeles Times	3.5/4 stars
Muzik	5/5
NME	6/10
Q	4/5 stars
Rolling Stone	2.5/5 stars
Spin	8/10

Bow Down to the Exit Sign received positive reviews from the majority of critics. AllMusic's John Bush saw it as a "vast improvement" over Holmes' previous studio record, Let's Get Killed, concluding, "while his previous work came off as soundtrack material in desperate search of a film to accompany it, Bow Down to the Exit Sign is very much a fully formed record."

== Track listing ==
No.	Title	Writer(s)	Length
1.	"Live from the Peppermint Store"	David Holmes	0:44
2.	"Compared to What" (featuring Carl Hancock Rux)	Gene McDaniels	6:15
3.	"Sick City" (featuring Bobby Gillespie)	Bobby Gillespie, Holmes, Darren Morris, Phil Mossman	4:20
4.	"Drexler's Apt - Aftermath, Afternoon"	Holmes	0:52
5.	"Bad Thing" (featuring Jon Spencer)	Holmes, Morris, Mossman, Jon Spencer	5:42
6.	"Voices, Siren, Rain"	Holmes	0:22
7.	"Incite a Riot"	Holmes, Morris, Mossman	4:57
8.	"69 Police" (featuring Sean Gullette)	Holmes, Morris, Mossman, Aldo Tagliapietra, Stanley Walden	4:31
9.	"Outrun" (featuring Martina Topley-Bird)	Holmes, Morris, Mossman, Martina Topley-Bird	4:46
10.	"Living Room" (featuring Carl Hancock Rux)	Holmes, Morris, Mossman, Carl Hancock Rux	6:43
11.	"Happiness"	Holmes	1:10
12.	"Slip Your Skin" (featuring Bobby Gillespie)	Gillespie, Holmes, Morris, Mossman	4:20
13.	"Zero Tolerance" (featuring Martina Topley-Bird)	Holmes, Morris, Mossman, Topley-Bird	4:00
14.	"Commercial Break"		0:32
15.	"Hey Lisa"	Holmes, Morris, Mossman	4:38
