= Diarmuid Mackey =

Kilkenny hurler

Personal information
- Native name: Diarmuid Mac Aodha (Irish)
- Born: 30 April 1978 (age 48) Mooncoin, County Kilkenny, Ireland
- Occupation: Sales rep
- Height: 5 ft 11 in (180 cm)

Sport
- Sport: Hurling
- Position: Full-forward
Club
- Years: Club
- Mooncoin
Club titles
- Kilkenny titles: 0
College
- Years: College
- 1996-2000: University College Cork
Inter-county
- Years: County
- 2002–2004: Kilkenny
Inter-county titles
- Leinster titles: 2
- All-Irelands: 2
- NHL: 2
- All Stars: 0

Diarmuid Anthony Mackey (born 30 April 1978) is an Irish former hurler. At club level, he played with Mooncoin and at inter-county level with the Kilkenny senior hurling team.

== Career ==
Born and raised in Mooncoin, County Kilkenny, Mackey played hurling at all levels as a student at De La Salle College in Waterford. He was part of the school's senior team for the Dr Harty Cup on a number of occasions. Mackey continued his hurling during his time as a student at University College Cork.

At club level, Mackey first played for Mooncoin at juvenile and underage levels before progressing to adult level. He first appeared on the inter-county scene with Kilkenny as part of the intermediate team in 2002. Mackey was also a member of the senior team's extended panel that year as Kilkenny made a clean sweep by claiming National Hurling League, Leinster SHC and All-Ireland SHC titles.

Mackey made his senior team debut in February 2003. He was again part of the team's clean sweep of National League, Leinster SHC and All-Ireland SHC victories. Mackey also won back-to-back Leinster IHC medals in 2003 and 2004, but also had back-to-back All-Ireland IHC final defeats by Cork.

== Honours ==
Kilkenny

- All-Ireland Senior Hurling Championship: 2002, 2003
- Leinster Senior Hurling Championship: 2002, 2003
- National Hurling League: 2002, 2003
- Leinster Intermediate Hurling Championship: 2003, 2004
