= Loaded (Primal Scream song) =

1990 single by Primal Scream

Single by Primal Scream

from the album Screamadelica
- B-side: "I'm Losing More Than I'll Ever Have"; "Ramblin' Rose" (live)
- Released: 19 February 1990
- Genre: Indie dance; dance-rock; psychedelia; house
- Length: 7:01
- Label: Creation
- Songwriters: Bobby Gillespie; Andrew Innes; Robert Young
- Producer: Andrew Weatherall

Primal Scream singles chronology
"Ivy Ivy Ivy" (1988)	"Loaded" (1990)	"Come Together" (1990)

"Loaded" is a song by Scottish rock band Primal Scream, released on 19 February 1990 by Creation Records as the lead single from their third studio album Screamadelica (1991). Mixed and produced by Andrew Weatherall, it is a remix of an earlier song titled "I'm Losing More Than I'll Ever Have". In 2014, NME placed the song at number 59 in its list of the "500 Greatest Songs of All Time".

== Inspiration and composition ==
Primal Scream first became aware of Andrew Weatherall after he published a favourable review of their eponymous second album in the Boys Own fanzine. Having subsequently met him at an acid house party at which he was DJing and become friends through various later meetings, it was suggested that he should remix "I'm Losing More Than I'll Ever Have" from the album, work for which he was to receive a fee of £500.

Weatherall's first attempt, which he later described as basically just having "slung a kick drum under the original", was judged by the band to have been too reverential to the source material and was rejected. Guitarist Andrew Innes instructed Weatherall to instead "just fucking destroy it". His subsequent attempt abandoned all of the original track with the exception of a seven-second sample.

At the start of the song, Weatherall added an audio sample of Frank Maxwell and Peter Fonda from the film The Wild Angels.

- Just what is it that you want to do?
- We wanna be free
- We wanna be free to do what we wanna do
- And we wanna get loaded
- And we wanna have a good time
- That's what we're gonna do
- (No way baby, let's go!)
- We're gonna have a good time
- We're gonna have a party

The rest of the song is constructed from the parts of "I'm Losing More Than I'll Ever Have", with a vocal sample from the Emotions' "I Don't Wanna Lose Your Love", and a drum loop from an Italian bootleg remix of Edie Brickell's song "What I Am", plus Bobby Gillespie singing a line from Robert Johnson's "Terraplane Blues".

Gillespie said in 1990 that he views "Loaded" as a dub record which is "closer to the sort of radical reconstructions that Jamaican producers like Joe Gibbs used to do with reggae songs in 1973 or 1974 than anything," adding: "Hopefully people will realise it has a different angle to something the Mondays or the Roses might do. I don't think we can be accused of jumping on any bandwagon. It's not like we're The Wonder Stuff."

== Single release ==
The single was released in February 1990, 18 months before the arrival of Screamadelica in October 1991. It was around 3 minutes shorter than the album version.

Upon the song's release, music journalist Push of Melody Maker wrote that, as "former darlings of indie rock", Primal scream "may lose some deities with their new house-orientated single 'Loaded', but Primal leader Bobby Gillespie is determined to use the dance floor groove to put some excitement back into the charts." Gillespie described "Loaded" as "a great track, probably one of the best records we've ever put out. I'm not even bothered about how our fans react to it. We lost some of our original following over the last LP, but we also gained a lot of others who'd never been into the band before and I'd be daft not to expect the same sort of thing to happen again." The song received over 7,500 advance orders, an achievement credited to its popularity at clubs and raves, rather than airplay or press coverage; as Gillespie said, "It's the first time that anything like that has ever happened to us. With 'Loaded', we're playing a totally different ball game."

"Loaded" reached number 16 on the UK Singles Chart, making it the group's first UK top 40 hit and garnering them a first appearance on television chart show Top of the Pops. The single features a remix from regular Weatherall collaborator Terry Farley whose version reincorporates part of the original vocal from "I'm Losing More Than I'll Ever Have". The 7-inch B-side is a Pat Collier remix of the source track, "I'm Losing More Than I'll Ever Have".

In the Netherlands, a novelty-type mash-up of "Loaded" and "Sympathy for the Devil", made and performed by two radio DJs, became a minor hit.

== Legacy ==
Muzik magazine listed the song as one of the 50 most influential dance records of all time, describing it as "unquestionably the finest indie dance record ever ... something akin to "Sympathy for the Devil" for the E generation". In 2022, it was included in the list "The story of NME in 70 (mostly) seminal songs": Mark Beaumont wrote that with this "majestic" song, "worlds of indie and dance most gloriously collided". Simon Reynolds credits the track's funkiness to Weatherall, "who transformed what was originally a bluesy ballad into a house music update of 'Sympathy for the Devil.'" Lisa Verrico of Vox said in 1994, "When DJ Andy Weatherall turned Primal Scream's 'I'm Losing More Than I'll Ever Have' into 'Loaded', he did more than create clubland's ultimate anthem. At a time when House music threatened to expose rock'n'roll as middle-aged, he showed British guitar bands how to be hip. 'Loaded' got Primal Scream out of an indie rut and launched today's multi-million-pound remix industry." In 2022, Rolling Stone ranked "Loaded" number 56 in their list of the "200 Greatest Dance Songs of All Time". In 2024, Swedish national radio Sveriges Radio P3 ranked it number 170 in their list of "World's 300 Best Songs".

== Track listings ==
- 7-inch vinyl
1. "Loaded" – 4:15
2. "I'm Losing More Than I'll Ever Have" – 4:45
- 12-inch vinyl (1) and CD
1. "Loaded" – 7:00
2. "I'm Losing More Than I'll Ever Have" – 4:45
3. "Ramblin' Rose" (live N.Y.C.) – 2:27
- 12-inch vinyl (2)
1. "Loaded" (Terry Farley re-mix) – 5:59
2. "I'm Losing More Than I'll Ever Have" – 4:45
3. "Ramblin' Rose" (live N.Y.C.) – 2:27

== Charts ==
Weekly chart performance for "Loaded"
Chart (1990)	Peak position
Europe (Eurochart Hot 100)	43
Netherlands (Dutch Top 40)	27
Netherlands (Single Top 100)	31
UK Singles (Official Charts)	16
US Alternative Airplay (Billboard)	19

== Certifications ==
Certifications and sales for "Loaded"
Region	Certification	Certified units/sales
United Kingdom (BPI)	Gold	400,000^{‡}
^{‡} Sales+streaming figures based on certification alone.

== In Popular Culture ==
The song is played in The Favor and Bridget Jones: The Edge of Reason. It was also played at the beginning of the 2013 film The World's End and was included in its soundtrack. The opening dialogue is also echoed by characters in the film's climax.

The song was also used in the premiere of Ryan Murphy’s Love Story, based on the lives of John F. Kennedy Jr. and his wife Carolyn Bessette.
