= Growl (album) =

Studio album by Radioactive Man
- Released: 2008
- Genre: Electronic, breakbeat, IDM
- Label: Control Tower Records

Radioactive Man chronology
Booby Trap (2003)	Growl (2008)

Professional ratings
Review scores
Source	Rating
PopMatters	7/10 stars
XLR8R	7.5/10 stars

Growl is a 2008 album by Radioactive Man, a pseudonym of Keith Tenniswood. It was his first release in five years as well as the first on his own label, Control Tower.

== Track listing ==
1. "Basement Business" (4:09)
2. "Pieces of Eight" (6:26)
3. "Nothing at All" featuring Dot Allison (4:29)
4. "Kristina" (6:11)
5. "Double Dealings" featuring Andrew Weatherall (5:57)
6. "5-Armed Skeleton" (6:06)
7. "Up in the Air" (1:46)
8. "Dalston to Detroit" (6:25)
9. "Growl" (5:03)
10. "State of That" (6:15)
11. "Lungfull of Bass" (6:12)
