= Jonathan O'Callaghan =

Irish hurler

Personal information
- Native name: Seán Ó Ceallacháin (Irish)
- Born: January 1978 (age 48) Castletownroche, County Cork
- Occupation: Postman
- Height: 6 ft 0 in (183 cm)

Sport
- Sport: Hurling
- Position: Right wing-forward
Clubs
- Years: Club
- Castletownroche → Avondhu
Club titles
- Cork titles: 0
Inter-county
Years	County	Apps (scores)
2004-2006	Cork	7 (0-08)
Inter-county titles
- Munster titles: 1
- All-Irelands: 2
- NHL: 0
- All Stars: 0

Jonathan O'Callaghan (born January 1978) is an Irish former hurler who played for club team Castletownroche, divisional side Avondhu and at inter-county level with the Cork senior hurling team. He usually lined out as a forward.

== Career ==
O'Callaghan first came to hurling prominence at juvenile and underage levels with Castletownroche. He progressed onto the club's top adult team and bookended his career with Cork JBHC title success in 1998 and 2019. He also earned selection with the Avondhu divisional side. O'Callaghan first enjoyed success on the inter-county scene as a member of the Cork intermediate hurling team and won All-Ireland Intermediate Championships in 2001 and 2003. He immediately joined the Cork senior hurling team and was an unused substitute when the team won consecutive All-Ireland Championship titles in 2004 and 2005. O'Callaghan was released from the Cork panel in February 2006.

== Career statistics ==
Team	Year	National League			Munster		All-Ireland		Total	
Team	Year	Division	Apps	Score	Apps	Score	Apps	Score	Apps	Score
Cork	2004	Division 1B	7	0-45	3	0-02	2	0-06	12	0-53
Cork	2005	Division 1B	5	0-02	1	0-00	1	0-00	7	0-02
Career total			12	0-47	4	0-02	3	0-06	19	0-55

== Honours ==
Castletownroche

- Cork Junior B Hurling Championship: 1998, 2019

Cork

- All-Ireland Senior Hurling Championship: 2004, 2005
- Munster Senior Hurling Championship: 2005
- All-Ireland Intermediate Hurling Championship: 2001, 2003
- Munster Intermediate Hurling Championship: 1999, 2001, 2003
