= Barntown Castle =

Tower house in County Wexford, Ireland

Coordinates: 52°20′N 6°31′W

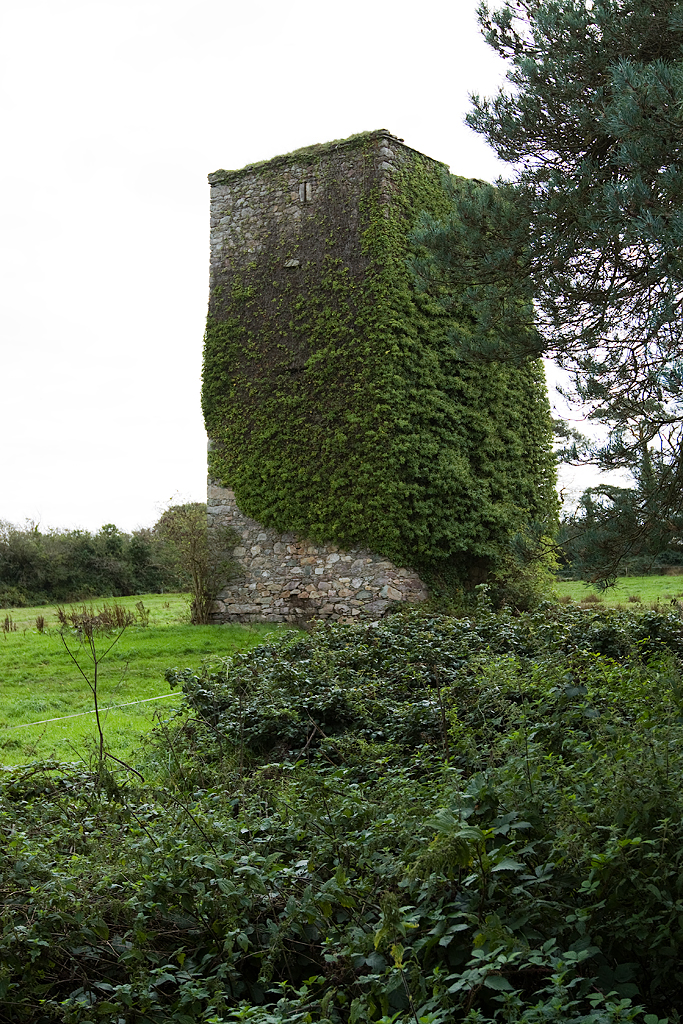
Barntown, Wexford in 2013

Barntown Castle is a tower house near Wexford town in Ireland. It is about 5 kilometres (3 mi) west of the centre of Wexford town, on the main Wexford to New Ross road. The castle, set in the middle of a grazing field, is now in ruins and used as a cattle shelter. A Georgian mansion has replaced the castle as the residence of the local landowners, currently the Joyce family.

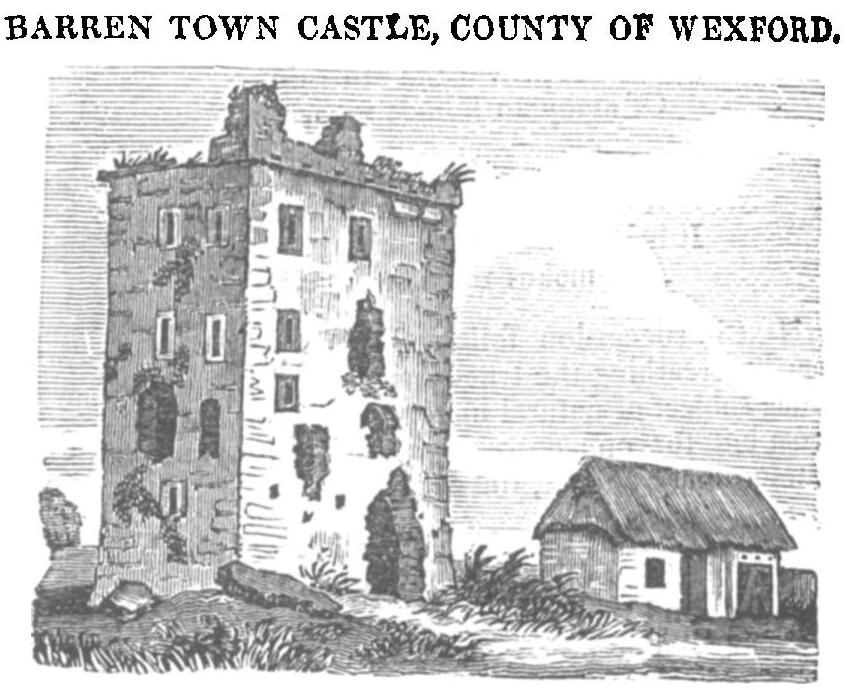
Barren Town Castle, Dublin Penny Journal 1836

Barntown village and townland has a Pugin designed Roman Catholic church and a national school. Close by, on the ridge of the hills south of the castle, is a monument to General Clooney famous for his part in the 1798 Rising. This man is referred to as Col. Clooney on a plaque at the ruins of Geneva Barracks, on Waterford Harbour. He also, reputedly, captured a British warship near Duncannon during the 1798 Rebellion. He is buried in St. Mullins.
