= Screamadelica =

Studio album by Primal Scream
- Released: 23 September 1991
- Recorded: 1990–1991
- Studios: Jam, Townhouse, Bark, and Olympic, London; Eden, Chiswick; Primal Scream's studio, Hackney
- Genres: Alternative rock; alternative dance; neo-psychedelia; Madchester; dance-rock; acid house; baggy
- Length: 62:31
- Labels: Creation (UK); Sire/Warner Bros. (US)
- Producers: Andrew Weatherall; Hugo Nicolson; The Orb; Hypnotone; Jimmy Miller

Primal Scream chronology
Primal Scream (1989)	Screamadelica (1991)	Give Out But Don't Give Up (1994)

Singles from Screamadelica
- 1. "Loaded" Released: February 1990; 2. "Come Together" Released: August 1990; 3. "Higher than the Sun" Released: June 1991; 4. "Don't Fight It, Feel It" Released: August 1991; 5. "Movin' On Up" Released: October 1991 (United States); January 1992 (as the Dixie-Narco EP; United Kingdom); 6. "Damaged" Released: August 1992 (Japan); 7. "Slip Inside This House" Released: September 1992 (Australia)

Screamadelica is the third studio album by Scottish rock band Primal Scream. It was first released on 23 September 1991 in the United Kingdom by Creation Records and on 8 October 1991 in the United States by Sire Records. The album marked a significant departure from the band's early indie rock sound, drawing inspiration from the blossoming house music scene and associated drugs such as LSD and MDMA. Much of the album's production was handled by acid house DJ Andrew Weatherall and engineer Hugo Nicolson, who remixed original recordings made by the band into dance-oriented tracks.

Screamadelica, featuring Manchester-born singer Denise Johnson, was the band's first album to be a commercial success, peaking at number eight on the UK Albums Chart upon its release. It received wide praise from critics, and has been frequently named one of the best albums of the 1990s in various polls. It won the first Mercury Music Prize in 1992 and has sold over three million copies worldwide.

== Background and recording ==
Drawing inspiration from the acid house scene, which was blossoming at the time, the band enlisted house DJs Andrew Weatherall and Terry Farley on producing duties. Weatherall and Gillespie bonded over "Thin Lizzy, dub-reggae, Mott The Hoople, disco music" and they were both attracted by "industrial, experimental funk". The band loved the fact that Weatherall was a DJ who had never been a producer at the helm in a studio before. Gillespie commented on: "It was just this natural talent to make this music and structure and arrange music in a way that we’d never heard before. So he could take our songwriting and our instrumental[s] [...] And the melodies and the gospel singers and the strings and the slate guitars, we played a lot of synthesisers as well. [...]". Weatherall selected the parts he liked and rearranged it: "he was really great at taking all this stuff and rearranging it and making it into this fantastic music". Acid house gave him an opportunity to work with the band.

"Loaded" was the first track on which Weatherall took part. He began remixing "I'm Losing More Than I'll Ever Have", from their previous album, and the resulting track disassembled the song, adding a drum loop from an Italian bootleg mix of Edie Brickell's "What I Am" and a sample from the Peter Fonda B movie The Wild Angels.

Although the band wrote a track also called "Screamadelica", it does not appear on the album. The ten-minute dance track was also produced by Weatherall and sung by Denise Johnson. It appears on the Dixie-Narco EP, released in 1992, and is featured in the opening credits of the now rare Screamadelica VHS video tape.

== Music ==
It seemed only natural that house, blues, soul, dub, ambient, rave, and psychedelic rock should come together in 65 minutes of joyful music; it seemed somehow right that a gang of MC5-obsessed rockers on their critical uppers should create a work of ecstasy-blasted euphoria that provided the Day-Glo yin to Nirvana’s turbulent yang. The results were the epitome of unfettered musical instinct, as Primal Scream and their motley crew powered through the history of modern music and into the future, operating on inspiration and too many early mornings.

— Ben Cardew of Pitchfork (September 28, 2022)

When asked what his influences were for Screamadelica, singer Bobby Gillespie said that Primal Scream were like a rock'n'roll band who had quite diverse taste. Many genres interested them like free jazz, funk, soul, country, blues, electronic music, post-punk, ambient music and psychedelic music from the 1960s. When naming the post-punk bands he listened to during his formative years, he explained: "a lot of those ideas are entrenched in Primal Scream, and maybe the last great rock bands were Siouxsie and the Banshees, the Buzzcocks and Joy Division. [...] The ideas in the music and the lyrics for those three bands completely influenced Primal Scream". Screamadelica was also influenced by the Beach Boys' album Pet Sounds (1966). Gillespie says that after discovering the album, their songs became much softer. Gillespie has also cited Nico's album The Marble Index as a major influence when they were making Screamadelica, claiming he "listened to [it] all the time." The band were also "big fans of '70s reggae and dub. These 12” sounded like dub records". Ben Cardew of Pitchfork assessed: "Its ragtag bag of influences meant Screamadelica sounded a lot like many people, but no one sounded quite like Screamadelica, an album both ahead of its time and light years ahead of the rock/dance curve."

== Artwork ==
The album cover for Screamadelica was painted by Creation Records' in-house artist Paul Cannell. Cannell was inspired by a damp water spot he had seen on the Creation Records offices ceiling after taking LSD.

Screamadelica was among ten album covers chosen by the Royal Mail for a set of "Classic Album Cover" postage stamps issued in January 2010.

The artwork also inspired a Fender Stratocaster for the album's 30th anniversary.

== Release and commercial performance ==
The lead single "Loaded" reached the top 20 in the UK Singles chart in early 1990.

Screamadelica was released on 23 September 1991 in the UK. It reached number 8 on the UK Albums Chart, and was later certified platinum by the British Phonographic Industry. The album has sold 715,000 copies as of September 2020. The single "Movin' On Up" was the band's breakthrough hit in the United States: as it was heavily played on alternative rock radio, it peaked at number 2 on the Billboard Modern Rock Tracks chart. It also reached number 28 on the Billboard Mainstream Rock Tracks chart as it was played on rock radio stations.

== Critical reception and legacy ==
Professional ratings
Review scores
Source	Rating
AllMusic	5/5 stars
Entertainment Weekly	B+
Los Angeles Times	3/4 stars
Mojo	5/5 stars
NME	10/10
Pitchfork	9.0/10
Record Collector	5/5 stars
The Rolling Stone Album Guide	3/5 stars
Select	5/5
Uncut	5/5 stars
Q	2/5 stars

Screamadelica was very well received by critics. In a contemporary review for Spin, Simon Reynolds called it a "totally mind-blowing" record whose best songs were "almost unclassifiable". AllMusic writer Stephen Thomas Erlewine deemed Screamadelica "an album that transcends its time and influence." AllMusic lists the album as the band's best. It was voted number 135 in Colin Larkin's All Time Top 1000 Albums 3rd Edition (2000). Pitchfork praised the album on their 2003 list of the "Top 100 albums of the '90s," saying: "Screamadelica's atmospheric and imaginative hybrid of past, present and future captured its moment in vivid color and splendor, and it still radiates with a kaleidoscopic glow." Robert Christgau of The Village Voice, on the other hand, assigned it a "neither" rating, indicating an album that does not warrant repeated listening despite coherent craft and one or two highlights.

It was Melody Maker's album of the year in 1991. It was also Select's album of the year in 1991, while NME placed it at no. 3 in its "Best Albums of 1991" list. The album won the first Mercury Music Prize in 1992. In 1996, Select named it as the number 1 album of the 1990s. In 2000, Q placed the album at number 18 on their list of the "100 Greatest British Albums." In 2001, Q placed it at number 81 on a list of the "Top 100 Albums of All Time." The album ranked number 2 in Q's "Best 50 Albums of Q's Lifetime" list. In 2003, NME placed it at no. 23 in its "100 Best Albums Ever" list. In 2003, Pitchfork placed it at number 77 in a list of the "Top 100 Albums of the '90s." Also in 2003, the album topped The Scotsman's list of 100 Best Scottish Albums. In 2006, the magazine also placed it at no. 15 in its "Greatest British Albums Ever" list. It appeared in Channel 4's list of the "100 Greatest Albums of All Time." In a 2009 review, the BBC hailed the album as "a solid gold classic." NME also named it the "Druggiest Album Ever" in 2011. It was ranked number 437 in the 2020 revised edition of Rolling Stone's list of the 500 Greatest Albums of All Time, and No. 1 on BrooklynVegan's "Creation Records' 21 Best Records" list.

"Movin' On Up" was used on the previous Telewest Broadband commercials before Virgin Media bought them out. Subsequently, Bacardi spirits used the song on a UK television ad. The song was also featured in the popular game Grand Theft Auto: San Andreas on alternative radio station Radio X. A Northern soul version was also recorded by Edwin Starr for the cult British surfing film Blue Juice. Kellogg's used the song in an advert for their cornflakes in c. 2011.

Guy-Manuel de Homem-Christo of French electronic duo Daft Punk, who drew inspiration from the rock and acid house in the United Kingdom during the early 1990s, referred to Screamadelica as the record that "put everything together in terms of genre".

To commemorate the 20th anniversary of the release of the album, Primal Scream performed the entire album live at Olympia London in West London on 26 and 27 November 2010. The performance included a full gospel choir and horn section. The first of these gigs was broadcast live on BBC 6 Music, presented by Steve Lamacq. These gigs were followed by a UK tour in March 2011, where the band performed the album in full.

For the album's 30th anniversary in 2021, Fender created a limited run of custom Stratocasters depicting the album's artwork on the body. Additionally, Columbia released the Demodelica album on 15 October 2021, with early demos and work-in-progress mixes, accompanied by notes by Jon Savage. "Most of these demos were produced by Andrew Innes at his home studio on the Isle of Dogs and at the band's studio in Hackney in 1990. The Jam and Eden Studio demos were produced by the band in 1991."

In 2022, Ben Cardew of Pitchfork wrote: "Primal Scream made it all sound far too easy on Screamadelica, whose combination of classic songwriting and electronic production left an early high-water mark for forward-thinking rock music in the 1990s."

== Track listing ==
All tracks are written by Bobby Gillespie, Andrew Innes and Robert Young, except "Slip Inside This House" written by Roky Erickson and Tommy Hall.

No.	Title	Producers	Length
1.	"Movin' On Up" (^{[C]})	Jimmy Miller	3:51
2.	"Slip Inside This House" (^{[A]})	Hypnotone; Andrew Innes; Andrew Weatherall (additional production)	5:16
3.	"Don't Fight It, Feel It"	Andrew Weatherall; Hugo Nicolson	6:53
4.	"Higher than the Sun"	The Orb	3:38
5.	"Inner Flight"	Andrew Weatherall; Hugo Nicolson	5:01
6.	"Come Together" (^{[B]})	Andrew Weatherall; Hugo Nicolson	10:21
7.	"Loaded"	Andrew Weatherall	7:02
8.	"Damaged"	Jimmy Miller	5:39
9.	"I'm Comin' Down"	Andrew Weatherall; Hugo Nicolson	6:00
10.	"Higher than the Sun (A Dub Symphony in Two Parts)" (featuring Jah Wobble)	Andrew Weatherall; Hugo Nicolson	7:38
11.	"Shine Like Stars"	Andrew Weatherall; Hugo Nicolson	3:45

=== 20th Anniversary Limited Collector's Edition ===
All tracks are written by Bobby Gillespie, Andrew Innes, and Robert Young, except "Carry Me Home" written by Dennis Wilson and Gregg Jakobson.

Dixie-Narco EP
No.	Title	Length
1.	"Movin' On Up"	3:48
2.	"Stone My Soul"	3:02
3.	"Carry Me Home"	5:16
4.	"Screamadelica"	10:49

Mixes
No.	Title	Length
1.	"Loaded" (Terry Farley 12" Mix)	6:02
2.	"Loaded" (7" Mix)	4:24
3.	"Come Together" (Terry Farley 7" Mix)	4:26
4.	"Come Together" (7" Mix)	4:56
5.	"Come Together" (Terry Farley Extended 12" Mix)	8:04
6.	"Come Together" (Hypnotone Brain Machine Mix)	5:18
7.	"Come Together" (BBG Mix)	6:28
8.	"Higher than the Sun" (Higher than the Orb)	5:02
9.	"Higher than the Sun" (12" Mix)	6:47
10.	"Higher than the Sun" (American Spring Mix)	6:25
11.	"Don't Fight It, Feel It" (7" Mix)	4:09
12.	"Don't Fight It, Feel It" (Graham Massey Mix)	5:00
13.	"Don't Fight It, Feel It" (Scat Mix)	7:57
14.	"I'm Losing More Than I'll Ever Have"	4:39

All tracks are written by Bobby Gillespie, Andrew Innes, and Robert Young, except "Cold Turkey" written by John Lennon, and "No Fun" written by Dave Alexander, Ron Asheton, Scott Asheton, and Iggy Pop.

Live at the Hollywood Palladium
No.	Title	Length
1.	"Movin' On Up"	5:05
2.	"Slip Inside This House"	5:55
3.	"Don't Fight It, Feel It"	5:53
4.	"I'm Losing More Than I'll Ever Have"	4:45
5.	"Damaged"	6:41
6.	"Screamadelica"	6:14
7.	"Loaded"	8:07
8.	"Come Together"	8:11
9.	"Higher than the Sun"	8:54
10.	"Cold Turkey"	5:02
11.	"No Fun"	4:13

DVD 1: The Making of Screamadelica Documentary
No.	Title	Length
1.	"The Making of Screamadelica"

DVD 2: Screamadelica: The Videos
No.	Title	Length
1.	"Screamadelica" (Promo video)
2.	"Movin' On Up" (Promo video)
3.	"Slip Inside This House" (Promo video)
4.	"Don't Fight It, Feel It" (Promo video)
5.	"Higher than the Sun" (Promo video)
6.	"Come Together" (Promo video)
7.	"Damaged" (Promo video)
8.	"Loaded" (Promo video)
9.	"Shine Like Stars" (Promo video)
10.	"Inner Flight" (Promo video)

Notes

- A The lyrics of "Slip Inside This House" were truncated and altered in places in comparison to the song's original recording by the 13th Floor Elevators. A notable example of such modification is in the chorus, where "Slip inside this house" was altered to "Trip inside this house".
- B On the American pressings of the album, the Terry Farley mix of "Come Together" was featured in place of the original UK mix. The Farley mix runs 8:06.
- C the piano part on "Movin' On Up" was recorded in Brighton by Les Field.

Samples

- "Movin' On Up" contains an interpolation of "Yoo Doo Right" by Can.
- "Slip Inside this House" is a cover of "Slip Inside this House" by 13th Floor Elevators, and contains samples of "Sex Machine" by Sly and the Family Stone, and the Amen break.
- "Don't Fight It, Feel It", contains an interpolation from "(I'm a) Road Runner" by Holland–Dozier–Holland.
- "Higher than the Sun" contains samples of "Wah Wah Man" by Young-Holt Unlimited, "Get Away Jordan" by Take 6 and the Blade Runner soundtrack by Vangelis.
- "Inner Flight" contains samples of "The Great Pretender" by Brian Eno, "Gris-Gris Gumbo Ya Ya" by Dr. John, and "Whoa Buck" by Alan Lomax.
- "Come Together" contains an interpolation of "The Dub Station" by Tommy McCook and the Aggrovators. UK versions contain a sample of a speech given by Jesse Jackson, while US versions contain dialogue from the film Sex, Lies, and Videotape, as well as the guitar riff from Elvis Presley's "Suspicious Minds".
- "Loaded" contains samples from "What I Am" by Edie Brickell, "I Don't Want to Lose Your Love" by the Emotions, "I'm Losing More than I'll Ever Have" by Primal Scream, and dialogue from the film The Wild Angels.
- "I'm Comin' Down" contains dialogue from the film Paris, Texas.

== Personnel ==
=== Primal Scream ===
- Bobby Gillespie – lead vocals
- Andrew Innes – guitar
- Robert Young – guitar, lead vocals on "Slip Inside This House"
- Martin Duffy – keyboards, piano
- Henry Olsen – bass, guitar solo on "Damaged"
- Phillip "Toby" Tomanov – drums, percussion

=== Guests ===
- Denise Johnson – lead vocals on track 3
- Jah Wobble – bass on track 10
- Kris Weston – guitar / keyboard on "Higher than the Sun"

=== Additional personnel ===
- Andrew Weatherall, Hugo Nicolson, Jimmy Miller, the Orb, Hypnotone – production
- Paul Anthony Taylor – programming
- Dave Burnham – engineering
- Les Field – piano
- Jimmy Miller – mixing
- Crispin Murray – editing

== Charts ==
1991–1992 chart performance for Screamadelica
Chart (1991–1992)	Peak position
European Albums (Music & Media)	36
UK Albums (Official Charts)	8
UK Independent Albums (OCC)	2
US Heatseekers Albums (Billboard)	31

1999–2000 chart performance for Screamadelica
Chart (1999–2000)	Peak position
Irish Albums (IRMA)	57
Scottish Albums (Official Charts)	19

2004 chart performance for Screamadelica
Chart (2024)	Peak position
Greek Albums (IFPI)	39

== Certifications ==
Certifications for Screamadelica
Region	Certification	Certified units/sales
United Kingdom (BPI)	2× Platinum	600,000^{‡}
^{‡} Sales+streaming figures based on certification alone.

== Release history ==
Release history for Screamadelica
Region	Date	Label	Format	Catalogue Ref
United Kingdom	23 September 1991	Creation	CD	CRECD 076
United Kingdom	23 September 1991	Creation	2LP	CRELP 076
United Kingdom	23 September 1991	Creation	MD	CREMD 076
Japan	1 October 1991	Columbia Music	CD	COCY 7985
United States	8 October 1991	Sire; WEA	CD	9 26714-2
