= 2001 All-Ireland Intermediate Hurling Championship =

Championship Details
- Dates: 27 May – 29 October 2001
- Teams: 12

All Ireland Champions
- Winners: Cork (3rd win)
- Captain: Paddy Barry

All Ireland Runners-up
- Runners-up: Wexford
- Captain: Eddie Cullen

Provincial Champions
- Munster: Cork
- Leinster: Wexford
- Ulster: Not Played
- Connacht: Not Played

Championship Statistics
- Matches Played: 10
- Total Goals: 24 (2.40 per game)
- Total Points: 256 (25.60 per game)
- Top Scorer: Jonathan O'Callaghan (1-32)

The 2001 All-Ireland Intermediate Hurling Championship was the 18th staging of the All-Ireland Intermediate Hurling Championship since its establishment by the Gaelic Athletic Association in 1961. The championship ran from 27 May to 29 October 2001.

Tipperary entered the championship as the defending champions, however, they were beaten by Clare in the Munster semi-final.

The All-Ireland final was played at Fraher Field in Dungarvan on 28 October 2001 between Cork and Wexford, in what was their first ever meeting in the final. Cork won the match by 2-17 to 2-08 to claim a third All-Ireland title overall and a first title in four years.

== Leinster Intermediate Hurling Championship ==
=== Leinster quarter-final ===
13 June 2001 Quarter-final	Laois	w/o - scr.	Dublin

=== Leinster semi-finals ===
4 July 2001 Semi-final	Laois	2-09 - 0-14	Kilkenny	O'Moore Park
	D Conroy 1-1, V Palmer 1-0, T Doran 0-3, J O'Shea 0-2, E Meagher 0-2, J Conroy 0-1.		R Cahill 0-5, C Dunne 0-3, O O'Connor 0-2, K O'Shea 0-2, J Barron 0-1, A Lawlor 0-1.

4 July 2001 Semi-final	Offaly	2-07 - 0-18	Wexford	St. Brendan's Park
	D Murray 1-2, D Kelly 1-0, P Molloy 0-2, C Hanniffy 0-1, M Cordial 0-1, A Mannion 0-1.		J Byrne 0-4, E Cullen 0-3, R Murphy 0-3, F Simpson 0-3, J Berry 0-2, J Kenny 0-1, J Simpson 0-1, S Carley 0-1.

=== Leinster final ===
18 July 2001 Final	Wexford	5-13 - 1-09	Laois	Nowlan Park
	J Kenny 1-3, E Cullen 1-3, F Simpson 1-1, P Carley 1-0, R Murphy 1-0, J Byrne 0-3, P Redmond 0-1, J Berry 0-1, J Simpson 0-1.		E Meagher 1-0, D Conroy 0-3, J Conroy 0-3, P McMahon 0-1, J O'Shea 0-1, V Palmer 0-1.

== Munster Intermediate Hurling Championship ==
=== Munster quarter-final ===
27 May 2001 Quarter-final	Cork	1-18 - 1-11	Limerick	Páirc Uí Chaoimh
	D Moher 1-2, M Daly 0-5, S Hayes 0-4, J O'Callaghan 0-2, N McCarthy 0-2, P Barry 0-1, J Hughes 0-1, J Russell 0-1.		M Tobin 1-7, PJ Garvey 0-2, A O'Connor 0-1, P Neenan 0-1.

=== Munster semi-finals ===
3 June 2001 Semi-final	Clare	0-12 - 1-08	Tipperary	Páirc Uí Chaoimh
	M Lennon 0-6, S Dyer 0-3, B Russell 0-1, S Arthur 0-1, D Conway 0-1.		K Nealon 1-2, B Stritch 0-3, G Slattery 0-2, M Spillane 0-1.

10 June 2001 Semi-final	Cork	0-21 - 3-08	Waterford	Páirc Uí Chaoimh
	J O'Callaghan 0-7, N McCarthy 0-5, D Moher 0-4, J Hughes 0-2, S Hayes 0-1, T O'Mahony 0-1, W Deasy 0-1.		S Daly 3-1, P Fitzgerald 0-5, N Curran 0-1, M Molumphy 0-1.

=== Munster final ===
18 July 2001 Final	Cork	1-20 - 1-11	Clare	Gaelic Grounds
	J O'Callaghan 1-11, N Murphy 0-3, M Daly 0-2, S Hayes 0-2, D Moore 0-2.		T Griffin 1-3, M Lennon 0-4, D Madden 0-2, B McMahon 0-2.

== All-Ireland Intermediate Hurling Championship ==
=== All-Ireland semi-finals ===
7 October 2001 Semi-final	Wexford	1-10 - 0-10	Meath	Geraldine Park
	E Cullen 0-7, R Murphy 1-0, J Byrne 0-2, W Carley 0-1.		N Horan 0-6, F McMahon 0-2, K Dowd 0-1, N Reilly 0-1.

13 October 2001 Semi-final	Cork	1-15 - 0-17	Galway	Gaelic Grounds
	N Murphy 1-3, J O'Callaghan 0-6, N McCarthy 0-3, R Dwyer 0-1; S Hayes 0-1, E Collins 0-1.		K Carr 0-8, D Joyce 0-4, N Kelly 0-3, M Greaney 0-1, B Mahony 0-1.	Referee: P Neary (Kilkenny)

=== All-Ireland final ===
28 October 2001 Final	Cork	2-17 - 2-08	Wexford	Fraher Field
	E Collins (2-0), J O’Callaghan (0-6), R Dwyer (0-5); T O’Mahony (0-2), S Hayes (0-2); N Murphy (0-1), N McCarthy (0-1).		MJ Reck (2-0), R Barry (0-5), W Carley (0-1), E Cullen (0-1); F Simpson (0-1).

== Championship statistics ==
=== Top scorers ===
Overall

Rank	Player	Team	Tally	Total	Matches	Average
1	Jonathan O'Callaghan	Cork	1-32	35	5	7.00
2	Eddie Cullen	Wexford	1-14	17	4	4.25
3	Niall McCarthy	Cork	0-11	11	5	2.20
4	Seán Daly	Waterford	3-01	10	1	10.00
4	Mark Tobin	Limerick	1-07	10	1	10.00
4	Niall Murphy	Cork	1-07	10	3	3.33
4	Mark Lennon	Clare	0-10	10	2	5.00
4	Séamus Hayes	Cork	0-10	10	5	2.00
9	Richard Murphy	Wexford	2-03	9	4	2.25
9	Dave Moher	Cork	1-06	9	5	1.80

In a single game

Rank	Player	Club	Tally	Total	Opposition
1	Jonathan O'Callaghan	Cork	1-11	14	Clare
2	Seán Daly	Waterford	3-01	10	Cork
2	Mark Tobin	Limerick	1-07	10	Cork
4	Keith Carr	Galway	0-08	8	Cork
5	Jonathan O'Callaghan	Cork	0-07	7	Waterford
5	Eddie Cullen	Wexford	0-07	7	Meath
7	Éamonn Collins	Cork	2-00	6	Wexford
7	M. J. Reck	Wexford	2-00	6	Cork
7	Tony Griffin	Clare	1-03	6	Cork
7	Justin Kenny	Wexford	1-03	6	Laois
7	Eddie Cullen	Wexford	1-03	6	Laois
7	Niall Murphy	Cork	1-03	6	Galway
7	Jonathan O'Callaghan	Cork	0-06	6	Galway
7	Nicky Horan	Meath	0-06	6	Wexford
7	Mark Lennon	Clare	0-06	6	Tipperary
7	Jonathan O'Callaghan	Cork	0-06	6	Wexford

=== Miscellaneous ===
- Wexford won the Leinster Championship for the first time since 1965.
