= USS Growler =

USS Growler has been the name of more than one United States Navy ship, and may refer to:

- USS Growler (1812 schooner), schooner acquired in 1812, captured by the British in 1813, recaptured by the United States in 1813, and finally captured by the British again in 1814
- USS Growler (1812 sloop), a sloop acquired in 1812 that the British captured in 1813 and renamed HMS Chubb. The United States recaptured her in 1814 and sold her in 1815.
- USS Growler (SS-215), a submarine commissioned in 1942 and sunk in 1944
- USS Growler (SSG-577), a cruise missile submarine in commission from 1958 to 1964, now a museum ship in New York City
