= David Holmes (musician) =

Northern Irish musician and composer

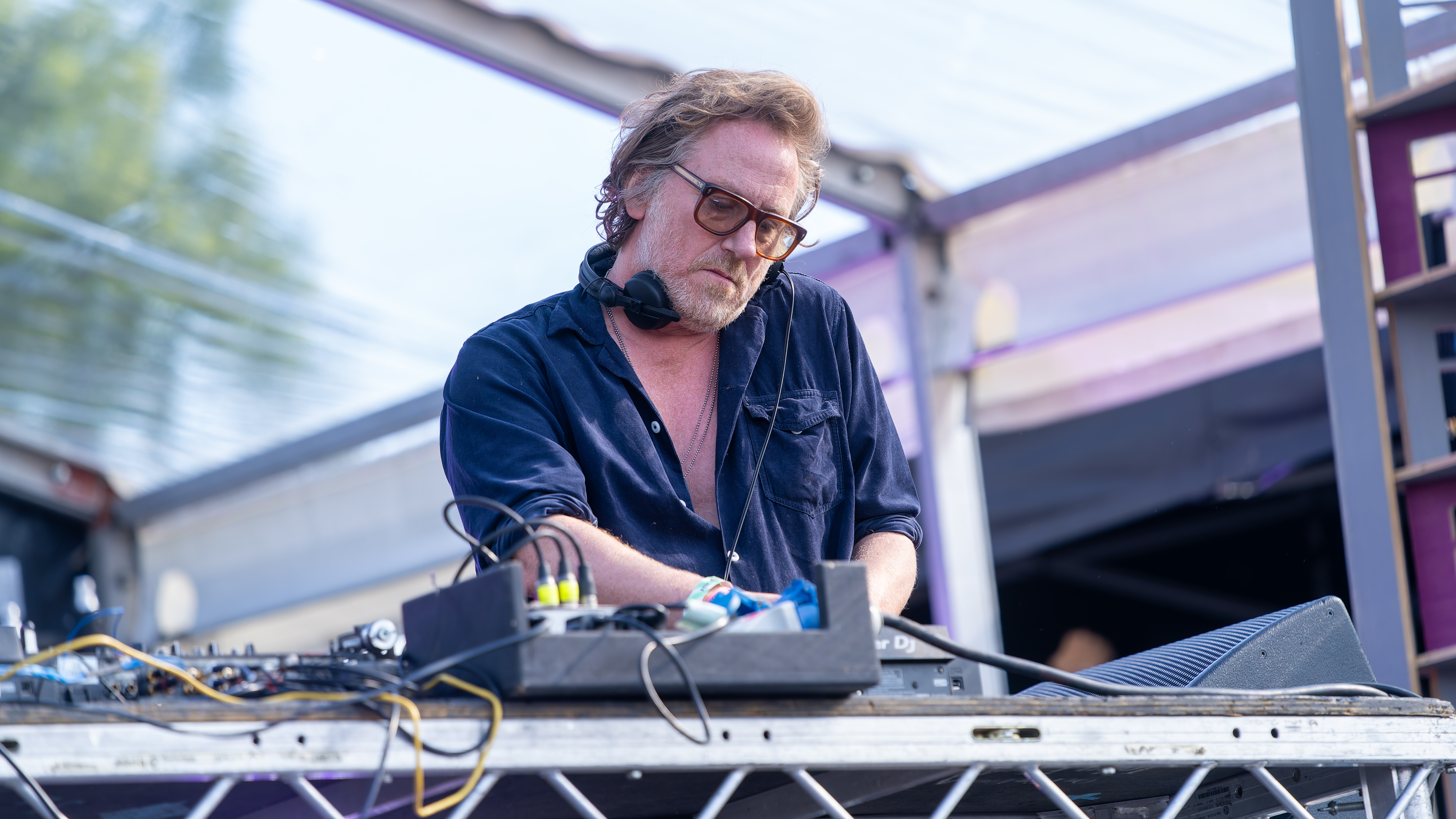
- Holmes in 2024

Background information
- Born: 25 February 1969 (age 57)
- Origin: Belfast, Northern Ireland
- Genres: Electronic, trip hop, krautrock, house
- Occupations: Musician, composer
- Instruments: Turntables, samples, keyboards, guitar, drums, programming

David Holmes (born 25 February 1969) is a Northern Irish musician and composer. He worked as a DJ before releasing several solo albums that incorporated elements of trip hop, big beat, rock and electronic music. In the late 1990s, he also began composing film scores, establishing a long-standing collaboration with director Steven Soderbergh that includes Out of Sight (1998) and the Ocean's trilogy.

Holmes is currently a member of the band Unloved, whose music has been used extensively in the television series Killing Eve, for which Holmes is also a composer. He has remixed songs for numerous artists and produced albums for Primal Scream and Noel Gallagher's High Flying Birds.

== Career ==
=== DJ ===
Holmes began DJing in Belfast from the age of 15. His first hit was the 1992 track "De Niro" as the Disco Evangelists, with Ashley Beedle and Lindsay Edwards (who later joined Tin Tin Out). In the early to mid-1990s, he ran two club nights in the Belfast Art College known as Sugar Sweet and Shake Yer Brain. Orbital wrote the track "Belfast", released on their debut album Orbital, after playing at Sugar Sweet.

Holmes released This Film's Crap Let's Slash the Seats, in July 1995. At the time he described the album as being inspired by movies and movie soundtracks, a recurring theme throughout Holmes' work (see Discography). The opening track, "No Man's Land", featured on the soundtrack to the film, Pi. In the same year, he also provided the ambient links between the songs on the album Infernal Love by Therapy?. In 1997, Holmes released Let's Get Killed. Many of the tracks featured Brazilians dancing in the streets of New York City, recorded by Holmes using a minidisc recorder. The album's first single, "My Mate Paul," was Holmes' first commercial success.

His 1997 Essential Mix, a mixture of northern soul, psychedelic funk and hip-hop was voted mix of the year by Muzik magazine. In 1998, Danny DeVito commissioned him to do the score for Steven Soderbergh's film Out of Sight. He scored a second film for Soderbergh in 2001, including some songs from Let's Get Killed and Bow Down to the Exit Sign on the Ocean's Eleven remake.

After releasing a remix album, Come Get It I Got It, in 2002, Holmes released David Holmes Presents The Free Association. This was a departure for the artist as all his previous work had been solo. The Free Association featured four other bandmates who toured with Holmes after the album was launched. As a remixer he has reworked tracks by artists such as U2, Doves, Manic Street Preachers, Primal Scream, Page and Plant, Saint Etienne and Ice Cube. In 2008, Holmes composed the music for the "New iPhone" ad campaign. An album, The Holy Pictures, was released on 8 September 2008, from which the track "Holy Pictures" was selected for the soundtrack of Pro Evolution Soccer 2010. The first track from this album, "I Heard Wonders", also featured in the movie Cherrybomb and the Opening Ceremony of the 2012 Olympics to accompany the footage of David Beckham and Jade Bailey bringing the olympic flame up the River Thames by speedboat. He worked with Leo Abrahams to create the score for the award-winning film Hunger, directed by Steve McQueen, about the 1981 Irish Hunger Strike. The score won an IFTA at the Irish Film Awards.

In April 2009, he topped The Irish Times' "50 Best Irish Acts Right Now". His film project Good Vibrations, was the first feature film from David's film company Canderblicks Film. Set in the heart of the punk rock scene of 1970s Belfast, it tells the story of Terri Hooley. Directed by Glenn Leyburn and Lisa Barros D'Sa, written by Glen Patterson and Colin Carbury and co-produced by Andrew Eaton (Revolution Films) & BBC Films, it was nominated for a BAFTA and the soundtrack was Rough Trade's Compilation of the year 2013.

=== Soundtracks ===
Holmes scored all three series of The Fall starring Gillian Anderson and Jamie Dornan. His score for the first series was nominated for an RTS Craft and Design Award in 2013 and winner of the best score at the Irish Film and TV Awards in 2014. He scored the film '71, for which he won an Ivor Novello Award. Directed by Yann Demange, the film tells the story of a British Soldier who became separated from his unit during a riot in Belfast at the height of The Troubles in 1971. In May 2015, Holmes' first film which he directed and wrote I Am Here was shown on Channel 4's The Shooting Gallery.

Holmes produced the third album by Noel Gallagher's High Flying Birds. Recorded and mixed in Belfast, the album Who Built the Moon? was released on 24 November 2017. In 2019, he and American musician, composer and music producer Keefus Ciancia won the Original Music category at the BAFTA TV Craft Awards for their work on the Killing Eve soundtrack.

== Discography ==
=== Studio albums ===
- This Film's Crap Let's Slash the Seats (1995) – UK No. 51
- Let's Get Killed (1997) – UK No. 34
- Bow Down to the Exit Sign (2000) – UK No. 22
- David Holmes presents The Free Association (2002) – UK No. 78
- The Holy Pictures (2008) – UK No. 65
- David Holmes ft. Raven Violet - 'Blind On A Galloping Horse' (2023)

=== Compilations and remixes ===
The Sabres of Paradise - "Smokebelch II (David Holmes remix)" 1993

- Essential Mix (1998) – previously broadcast on BBC Radio 1
- Stop Arresting Artists (1998) – remix album
- Holmes on the Decks (2000) – remix album; a limited edition un-mixed vinyl version was also released
- Come Get It I Got It (2002) – remix album
- The Dogs Are Parading (2010) – compilation album
- Late Night Tales: David Holmes (2016) - compilation album

=== Film soundtracks ===
- Resurrection Man (1998)
- Out of Sight (1998)
- Three Chords and a Wardrobe (1998, short film)
- Buffalo Soldiers (2001)
- Ocean's Eleven (2001)
- Analyze That (2002)
- Code 46 (2003)
- Stander (2003)
- Ocean's Twelve (2004)
- The War Within (2005)
- The 18th Electricity Plan (2006, short film)
- Ocean's Thirteen (2007)
- Hunger (2008)
- The Girlfriend Experience (2009)
- Cherrybomb (2009)
- Perrier's Bounty (2009)
- Five Minutes of Heaven (2009)
- The Edge (2010)
- The Shore (2011, short film) (with Foy Vance)
- Haywire (2012)
- Good Vibrations (2012)
- The Motel Life (2012)
- Diana (2013)
- Light of My Eyes (2014, short film)
- '71 (2014)
- 13 Minutes (2015)
- I Am Here (2015)
- I Am Belfast (2015)
- Mindhorn (2016)
- Logan Lucky (2017)
- The Laundromat (2019)
- Ordinary Love (2019)
- Pixie (2020)
- No Sudden Move (2021)
- Lyra (2022)
- Marlowe (2022)
- Black Bag (2025)
- The Christophers (2025)

=== Television soundtracks ===
- Dara Ó Briain's Science Club (2012, theme music)
- The Fall (2013, theme music)
- London Spy (2015)
- Death and Nightingales (2018)
- Mosaic (2018)
- Killing Eve (2018–2019)
- Kin (2021)
- This England (2022)
- The Woman In The Wall (2023)
