= Two Lone Swordsmen =

British electronic music duo

- Also known as: Aramchek; Basic Units; The Black Balloons; C-Pij; Frisch und Munter; Hidden Library; The Hold; Klart; Klunk; Lino Squares; Rude Solo
- Origin: London, England
- Genre: Electronic
- Years active: 1996–2020
- Labels: Emissions Audio Output; Warp; Rotters Golf Club
- Past members: Andrew Weatherall; Keith Tenniswood

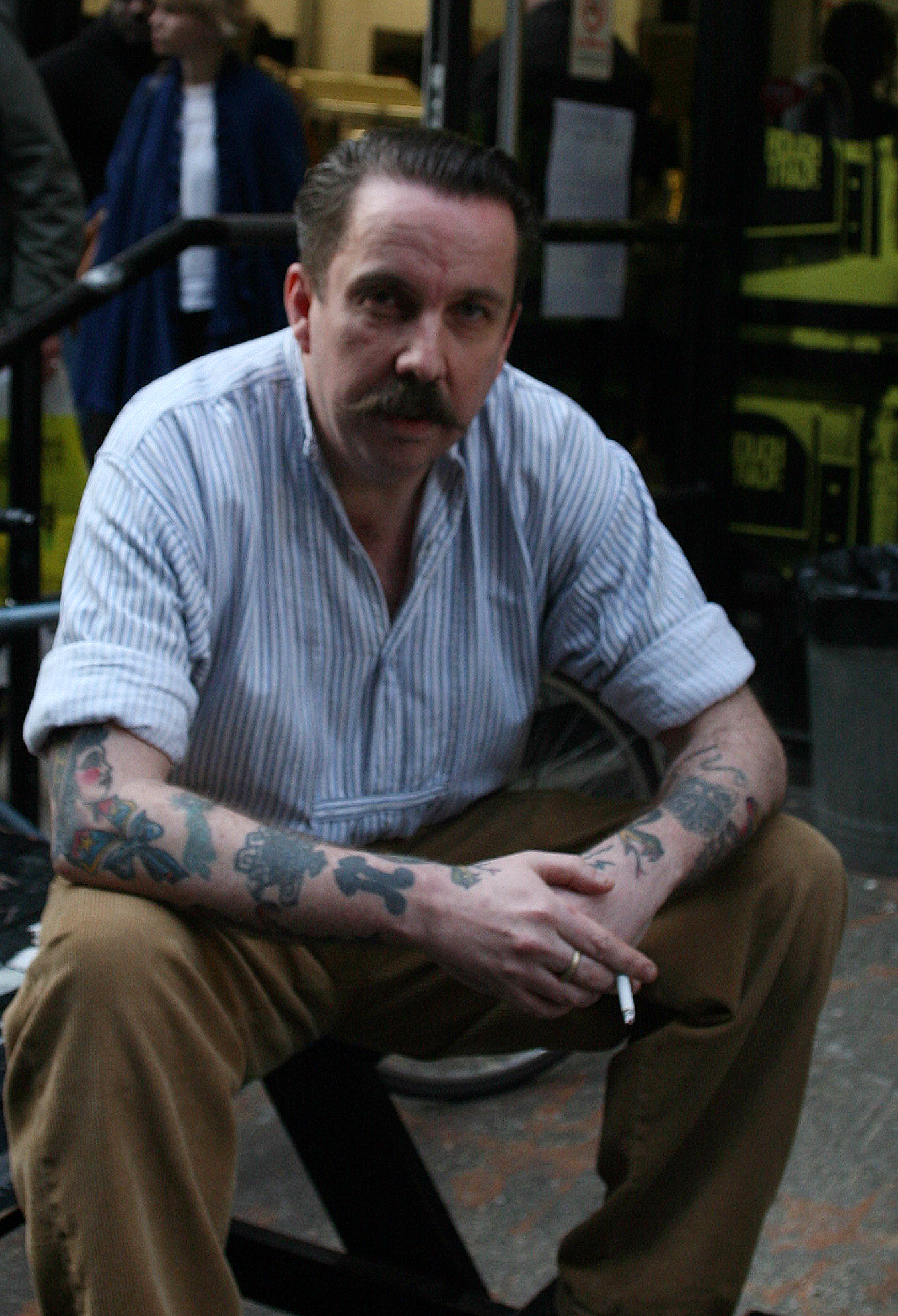
Andrew Weatherall

Two Lone Swordsmen were a British electronic music duo from London, consisting of Andrew Weatherall and Keith Tenniswood.

== History ==
Formed by Andrew Weatherall and Keith Tenniswood in 1996, following the dissolution of Weatherall's the Sabres of Paradise, Two Lone Swordsmen released material on the record label Emissions Audio Output, run by Weatherall. However, the small nature of the operation limited the duo's success and they subsequently signed to Warp.

Two Lone Swordsmen's debut studio album, The Fifth Mission (Return to Flightpath Estate), was released in 1996. 1998's Stay Down was placed at number 22 on Pitchfork's "50 Best IDM Albums of All Time" list. Tiny Reminders (2000) was placed at number 19 on Pitchfork's "Top 20 Albums of 2000" list. The duo released From the Double Gone Chapel in 2004.

On 17 February 2020, Weatherall died due to a pulmonary embolism at the age of 56. Weatherall's death marked the end of Two Lone Swordsmen, as Tenniswood decided to fold the group.

== Discography ==
=== Studio albums ===
- The Fifth Mission (Return to Flightpath Estate) (Emissions Audio Output, 1996)
- Stay Down (Warp, 1998)
- Tiny Reminders (Warp, 2000)
- From the Double Gone Chapel (Warp, 2004)
- Wrong Meeting (Rotters Golf Club, 2007)
- Wrong Meeting II (Rotters Golf Club, 2007)

=== Compilation albums ===
- Further Reminders (Warp, 2001)
- Peppered with Spastic Magic: A Collection of Two Lone Swordsmen Remixes (RGC, 2003)
- Emissions Audio Output: From the Archive Vol/01 (RGC, 2006)

=== Album-length EPs ===
- Swimming Not Skimming (Emissions Audio Output, 1996) – limited release
- Stockwell Steppas (Emissions Audio Output, 1997) – limited release

=== EPs ===
- The Third Mission (Emissions Echoic, 1996)
- The Tenth Mission (Emissions Audio Output, 1996)
- Two Lone Swordsmen and a Being (Special Emissions, 1996) (with Being)
- The Role of Linoleum (Humboldt County, 1997) (as Lino Squares)
- D.C.Fumes EP (New Emissions, 1997) (as Rude Solo)
- A Bag of Blue Sparks (Warp, 1998)
- A Virus with Shoes (Warp, 1999)
- Receive Tactical Support (Warp, 1999)
- Klunk (Subvert, 1999) (as Klunk)
- Locked Swords (Warp, 2001)
- Benicassim EP (RGC, 2001) (as Aramchek)
- For Shavers Only (RGC, 2001) (as Klart)
- Dark Eldar (Art of Perception, 2001) (as Rude Solo)
- Big Silver Shining Motor of Sin E.P. (Warp, 2004)

=== Singles ===
- "Stuka" (Creation Records, 1997) (as Primal Scream Meet the Two Lone Swordsmen)
- "Tuning Up!" (Soundboy Entertainment, 1997) (as Ballistic Brothers vs. the Two Lone Swordsmen)
- "The Gates to Film City" (Domino Recording Company, 1998) (as Future Pilot A.K.A. vs. Two Lone Swordsmen)
- "Have You Ever Wondered Who Really Writes the Tabloids' Club Columns?" (Slut Smalls, 1999)
- "Nostik" / "Tall Lights" (C-Pij, 1999) (as C-Pij)
- "Tiny Reminder No1 (C-Pij Remix Vocal)" / "Tiny Reminder No1 (C-Pij Remix)" (Warp, 2001)
- "Vous Do Funk?" / "Awoken by Beetles" (Voodoo, 2001) (as Rude Solo)
- "Explode" / "Fly Bi Wire" (Firewire, 2002) (as Basic Units)
- "Untitled" (Hidden Library, 2002) (as Hidden Library)
- "Sex Beat" (Warp, 2004)
