= Rotters Golf Club =

British electro record label

- Founded: 2001
- Founder: Andrew Weatherall
- Genre: Electro; Post-rock; Drum'n'bass; Post-punk; Techno
- Country of origin: UK
- Location: London

Rotters Golf Club is an electro record label set up by DJ Andrew Weatherall in 2001. The label was mainly 12" single-orientated, with most releases actually by Two Lone Swordsmen (Weatherall and Keith Tenniswood a.k.a. Radioactive Man) under various guises, with Remote, Craig Walsh and Decal being the only other contributors.

RGC resumed in late 2006 after almost three years of inactivity, with a new LP by Two Lone Swordsmen titled Wrong Meeting, and Andrew Weatherall's debut solo single The Bullet Catcher's Apprentice, a disco-influenced post punk guitar-based effort, moving away from the label's electronic background.

== Discography ==
=== 12" Singles ===
- Klart For Shavers Only (RGC001, 2001)
- Aramchek Benicassim EP (RGC002, 2001)
- Radioactive Man The Uranium EP (RGC003, 2001)
- Rude Solo, Klart, Aramchek and Frisch Und Munter Machine Funk Specialists (Part 1) (RGC004, 2002)
- Decal, The Hold, Craig Walsh and Radioactive Man Machine Funk Specialists (Part 2) (RGC005, 2002)
- Radioactive Man Dive And Lie Wrecked (RGC006, 2002)
- Radioactive Man Wrecked Remixes (RGC007, 2002)
- Decal Freekin' Empires EP (RGC008, 2003)
- Radioactive Man Itisanditisnt (RGC009, 2003)
- Radioactive Man Fed-Ex To Munchen (RGC010, 2003)
- Andrew Weatherall The Bullet Catcher's Apprentice (RGC011, 2006)

=== Albums ===
- Radioactive Man Radioactive Man (RGCLP/CD001, 2001)
- Various Machine Funk Specialists (RGCCD002, 2002)
- Remote Remotion (RGCLP007, 2003)
- Radioactive Man Booby Trap (RGCLP009, 2003)
- Decal Brightest Star (RGCLP/CD010, 2003)
- Various Peppered With Spastic Magic - A Collection Of Two Lone Swordsmen Remixes (RGCCD011, 2003)
- Two Lone Swordsmen Emissions Audio Output - From The Archive Vol/01 (RGCCD012, 2006)
- Two Lone Swordsmen Wrong Meeting (RGCLP013, 2007)
- The Asphodells Ruled by Passion Destroyed by Lust (2013) – Andrew Weatherall and Timothy J Fairplay
- Andrew Weatherall Convenanza (2016)

== See also ==
- List of record labels
