= 1999 Cork Junior A Football Championship =

- Dates: 17 October – 5 December 1999
- Teams: 8
- Champions: Youghal (3rd title); M. O'Brien (captain)
- Runners-up: Ilen Rovers; P. Connolly (captain)

Tournament statistics
- Matches played: 8
- Goals scored: 25 (3.13 per match)
- Points scored: 171 (21.38 per match)

The 1999 Cork Junior A Football Championship was the 101st staging of the Cork Junior A Football Championship since its establishment by Cork County Board in 1895. The championship ran from 17 October to 5 December 1999.

The final was played on 5 December 1999 at Páirc Uí Rinn in Cork, between Youghal and Ilen Rovers, in what was their first ever meeting in the final. Youghal won the match by 3–07 to 1–12 to claim their third championship title overall and a first title in 93 years.

== Qualification ==
Division	Championship	Champions
Avondhu	North Cork Junior A Football Championship	Killavullen
Beara	Beara Junior A Football Championship	Adrigole
Carbery	South West Junior A Football Championship	Ilen Rovers
Carrigdhoun	South East Junior A Football Championship	Kinsale
Duhallow	Duhallow Junior A Football Championship	Kiskeam
Imokilly	East Cork Junior A Football Championship	Youghal
Muskerry	Mid Cork Junior A Football Championship	Canovee
Seandún	City Junior A Football Championship	Nemo Rangers

== Results ==
=== Quarter-finals ===
17 October 1999 Quarter-final	Kiskeam	2–10 – 1–09	Nemo Rangers	Coachford Grounds
	J Doody 1–4, J Dennehy 1–2, N Cronin 0–2, Denis O'Leary 0–1, David O'Leary 0–1.		G O'Regan 1–3, M Kearney 0–2, M Dunne 0–1, A Quinlivan 0–1, D Meighan 0–1, A Hogan 0–1.

30 October 1999 Quarter-final	Youghal	1–10 – 0–11	Adrigole	St Mary's Park
	E Coleman 1–3, M Ó Laochdha 0–2, M Walsh 0–1, K Coleman 0–1, J O'Flynn 0–1, B Coleman 0–1, A Healy 0–1.		BJ O'Sullivan 0–4, M Harrington 0–4, JL O'Sullivan 0–3.

24 October 1999 Quarter-final	Ilen Rovers	3–14 – 2–13	Killavullen	Carrigadrohid Grounds
	B O'Sullivan 2–2, C Collins 1–2, F Collins 0–3, E Sheehy 0–2, K Daly 0–2, P Connolly 0–1, C O'Driscoll 0–1, F Connolly 0–1.		I O'Driscoll 2–1, J O'Mahony 0–3, D Hartnett 0–2, M Whelan 0–2, G Kelleher 0–2, L Dorgan 0–1, A O'Driscoll 0–1, J O'Regan 0–1.

20 November 1999 Quarter-final	Kinsale	2–10 – 1–12	Canovee	Charlie Hurley Park
	G Murphy 1–5, G Farrissey 1–3, F O'Hanlon 0–1, J O'Donovan 0–1.		P Dunlea 0–6, J Barry-Murphy 1–0, R O'Dwyer 0–1, N Dunne 0–1, T McCarthy 0–1, T O'Mahony 0–1.

=== Semi-finals ===
6 November 1999 Semi-final	Youghal	1–10 – 2–07	Kiskeam	Ballyhooly Grounds
	S Landers 1–2, K Dempsey 0–3, M Ó Laochdha 0–2, M Walsh 0–2, E Coleman 0–1.		D O'Leary 0–5, J Dennehy 1–0, M Angland 1–0, J Doody 0–1, N Cronin 0–1.

21 November 1999 Semi-final replay	Youghal	2–17 – 1–12 (aet)	Kiskeam	Ballyhooly Grounds
	S Landers 2–3, J O'Flynn 0–4, M Ó Laochdha 0–3, K Coleman 0–3, B Coleman 0–1, M Walsh 0–1, K Demspey 0–1, E Coleman 0–1.		J Doody 1–2, J Herlihy 0–4, N Cronin 0–4, D O'Leary 0–1, M Angland 0–1.

28 November 1999 Semi-final	Ilen Rovers	3–14 – 0–03	Kinsale	Timoleague Grounds
	K Daly 2–2, P Connolly 0–5, C Collins 1–0, J Whooley 0–2, F Collins 0–2, B O'Sullivan 0–1, C O'Driscoll 0–1, D Duggan 0–1.		G Murphy 0–2, G Condon 0–1.

=== Final ===
5 December 1999 Final	Youghal	3–07 – 1–12	Ilen Rovers	Páirc Uí Rinn
	S Landers 2–1, M Walsh 1–1, J O'Flynn 0–3, E Coleman 0–1, K Dempsey 0–1.		P Connolly 0–5, B O'Sullivan 1–1, F Collins 0–2, C Collins 0–2, J Whooley 0–1, K Daly 0–1.	Referee: J Geaney (Kilshannig)
