= Des Mythen =

Irish hurler

Desmond Mythen is an Irish hurler who played as a right corner-forward with the Wexford senior team.

Mythen made his debut on the inter-county scene at the age of sixteen when he was selected for the Wexford minor team. He enjoyed two unsuccessful championship seasons with the minor team. He subsequently joined the Wexford under-21 team, winning a Leinster medal in 2004. Muthen made his senior debut during the 2005 championship.

== Career statistics ==
=== Club ===
Team	Year	Leinster		All-Ireland		Total	
Team	Year	Apps	Score	Apps	Score	Apps	Score
Oulart-the Ballagh	2004-05	2	1-07	0	0-00	2	1-07
Oulart-the Ballagh	2005-06	2	3-05	0	0-00	2	3-05
Oulart-the Ballagh	2007-08	1	0-04	0	0-00	1	0-04
Oulart-the Ballagh	2009-10	1	0-00	0	0-00	1	0-00
Oulart-the Ballagh	2010-11	1	1-00	0	0-00	1	1-00
Oulart-the Ballagh	2011-12	3	0-00	0	0-00	3	0-00
Oulart-the Ballagh	2012-13	1	0-00	0	0-00	1	0-00
Oulart-the Ballagh	2013-14	3	0-08	0	0-00	3	0-08
Oulart-the Ballagh	2015-16	3	0-09	1	0-03	4	0-12
Oulart-the Ballagh	2016-17	2	0-04	0	0-00	2	0-04
Total		19	5-37	1	0-03	20	5-40
