= 2000 Cork Intermediate Football Championship =

Gaelic football competition

- Sponsor: Permanent TSB
- Champions: Youghal (1st title); Seán Hayes (manager)
- Runners-up: Nemo Rangers

The 2000 Cork Intermediate Football Championship was the 65th staging of the Cork Intermediate Football Championship since its establishment by the Cork County Board in 1909.

The final, a replay, was played on 25 November 2000 at the Rostellan Grounds in Aghada, between Youghal and Nemo Rangers, in what was their first ever meeting in the final. Youghal won the match by 1-01 to 0-03 to claim their first ever championship title.

== Results ==
=== Final ===
18 November 2000 Final	Youghal	1-09 - 2-06	Nemo Rangers	Rostellan Grounds
	J Flynn 1-2, E Coleman 0-2, B Coleman 0-2, JP Joyce 0-1, M Walsh 0-1, M Ó Laochdha 0-1.		M Kearney 1-1, A Morgan 1-1, J Masters 0-3, JP O'Neill 0-1.

=== Final replay ===
25 November 2000 Final replay	Youghal	1-01 - 0-03	Nemo Rangers	Rostellan Grounds
	S Landers 1-0, J Flynn 0-1.		A Morgan 0-1, J Coogan 0-1, J Masters 0-1.	Referee: N Barrett
