= Keith Tenniswood =

British DJ, producer and remixer

Keith Tenniswood is a British DJ, producer, and remixer. He was one half of the electronic act Two Lone Swordsmen alongside Andrew Weatherall, and produces music on his own as Radioactive Man. He co-runs the Control Tower electro label with Simon Brown, and co-ran the Rotters Golf Club imprint with Weatherall. Tenniswood has also worked with David Holmes on his album Let's Get Killed (1997), the Aloof, Red Snapper, Death in Vegas and Primal Scream.

== Discography ==
=== Albums ===
- Radioactive Man (Rotters Golf Club, 2001)
- Booby Trap (Rotters Golf Club, 2003)
- Fabric 08 (Fabric 2003)
- Growl (2008)
- Waits and Measures (WANGTRAX, 2012)
- Luxury Sky Garden (2017)
- Jam Out The Kicks (2024)

=== Singles ===
- "Dive and Lie Wrecked" (Rotters Golf Club, 2001)
- "Sector 6 12"|Sector 6" (Control Tower, 2001)
- The Uranium EP (Rotters Golf Club, 2001)
- "Wrecked Remixes" (Rotters Golf Club, 2002)
- "Itisanditisnt" (Rotters Golf Club, 2003)
- "Wrecked Remixes" (Rotters Golf Club, 2002)
- Ye Olde Skoole Rayve EP (Control Tower, 2006)
- "Go Ahead London" (Tuppence, 2018)
