= Lyonheart K =

The Lyonheart K is a proposed British-built grand tourer based on Jaguar XK running gear. It was planned to be unveiled at the 2012 Geneva Motor Show as a development of the 2011 concept Vizualtech Growler E and is a reinterpretation of the Jaguar E-Type.

The unveiling of the K was delayed and was not shown at the scheduled 2014 Geneva Motor Show following plans to change the platform and engine to the newer Jaguar F-Type. Sales were scheduled to commence in 2015.

The K was to be manufactured in Coventry by the newly created Lyonheart Cars company, owned by Swiss-based Classic Factory. Up until late 2015 there was no evidence that the company had built either a prototype or any other touchable or viewable artefact. This design exists solely as computer-generated 3D images, and as of 2020, the official website is no longer live.

Lyonheart Cars Ltd was dissolved in February 2017.

== Specifications ==
The Lyonheart K was specified to have had a kerb weight of 1,575 kg (3,472 lb), be 4,749 mm (187.0 in) long, 1,893 mm (74.5 in) wide, and 1,289 mm (50.7 in) high, and would have had a wheelbase of 2,752 mm (108.3 in).

It was intended to use the 5.0 L supercharged V8 from the Jaguar XK. It was claimed that it would be able to accelerate from 0 to 60 mph (96.6 km/h) in less than 4 seconds and have a top speed close to 190 mph (305.8 km/h). The engine was to be tuned by Cosworth and produce 567 bhp (423 kW; 575 PS) and 516 lb⋅ft (700 N⋅m) of torque.
