= Barntown =

Village in County Wexford, Ireland

Coordinates: 52.33649°N 6.52554°W

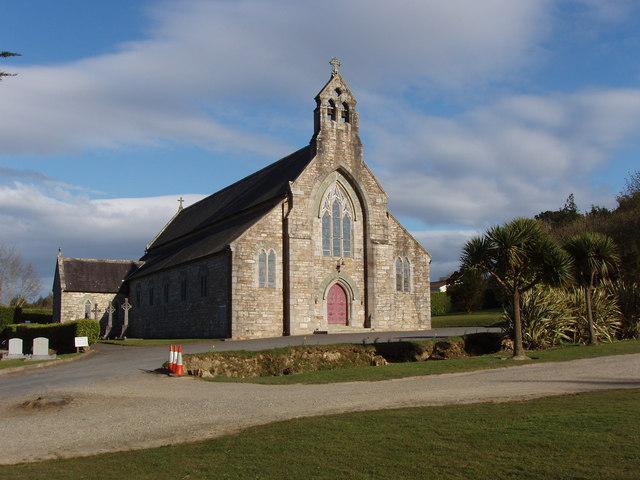
St. Alphonsus' Church, Barntown, designed by Augustus Welby Pugin, was dedicated in 1851

Barntown (Irish: Baile an Bharúnaigh) is a townland and village in County Wexford, Ireland, located just outside the town of Wexford. As of the 2022 census, Barntown had a population of 505 people.

The remains of Barntown Castle, a Norman tower house, lies to the east of the village of Barntown. It was built by the Roche family in the 15th or 16th century, and was used as a watchtower and storehouse for Ferrycarrig Castle.

St Alphonsus Church is the main church of the parish. It was designed by Augustus Welby Pugin, and built in 1848 by the Very Rev Patrick Murphy.

Barntown was joined with the parish of cummers to found the Cummers-Barntown GAA club in 1885.
