= Andrew Weatherall =

English DJ, record producer and remixer (1963–2020)

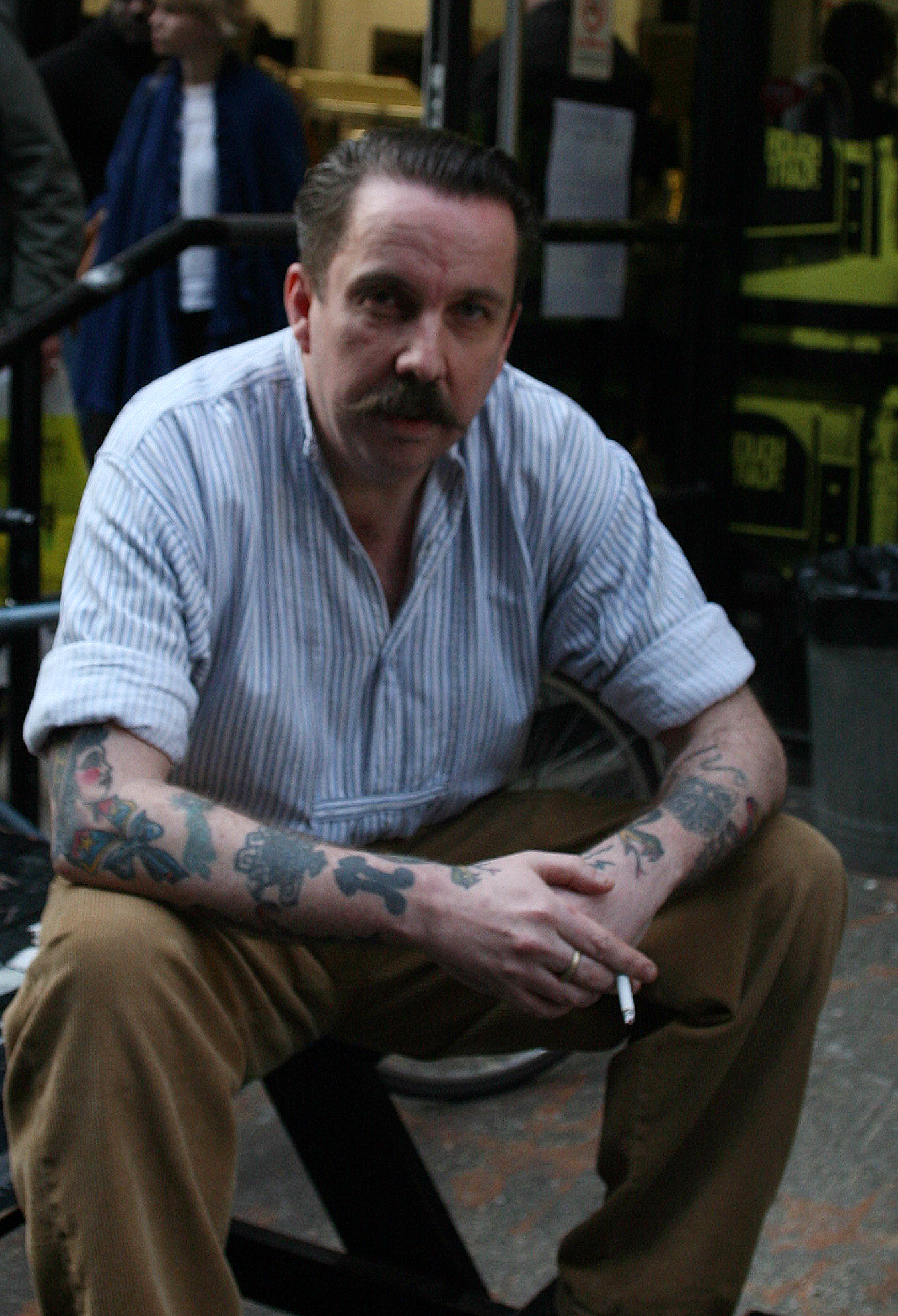
- Weatherall in 2009

Background information
- Also known as: The Chairman
- Born: Andrew James Weatherall; 6 April 1963; Windsor, Berkshire, England
- Died: 17 February 2020 (aged 56) London, England
- Genres: Electronic; house; techno; balearic; dub; post-punk
- Occupations: DJ; producer; musician; remixer
- Instruments: Turntables; synthesiser; sequencer; guitar; bass; drums; voice
- Labels: Hidden Library; Boy's Own; Rotters Golf Club; Sabres of Paradise; Höga Nord
- Website: Rotters Golf Club

Andrew James Weatherall (6 April 1963 – 17 February 2020) was an English musician, DJ, songwriter, producer and remixer. His career took him from being a DJ in the acid house movement of the late 1980s to being a remixer of tracks by Happy Mondays, New Order, Björk, the Orb, the Future Sound of London, My Bloody Valentine, Saint Etienne, Primal Scream, Moby and James.

His production work on Primal Scream's album Screamadelica, adding samples, loops and creating an influential mix of hard rock, house and rave, helped the record win the first ever Mercury Music Prize in 1992 and become one of the most celebrated albums of the 1990s.

== Biography ==
Andrew James Weatherall was born on 6 April 1963, in Windsor, Berkshire, England, to Robert Weatherall and Carol (Spires) Weatherall. During his teenage years, he started going to Funk & Soul Weekenders and disco parties. After leaving the local grammar school, he left home at the age of 18, and worked in a variety of jobs including on building sites, as a carpenter and moving furniture.

He moved to London in the late 1980s, where his record collection and musical knowledge brought him requests to DJ at parties. Terry Farley hired him to play at the Trip club, Weatherall playing mostly northern soul and indie records. Weatherall started writing as a freelance music journalist (using both his own name and the pseudonym "Audrey Witherspoon"). Together with Terry Farley, Cymon Eckel and Steve Mayes, they started Boy's Own, initially as a fanzine commenting on fashion, records, football and other issues.

Weatherall's DJ career started to take off when he met Danny Rampling at actor Bobby's (Bobby Collins) party that he played at in Chapel Market, Islington, and Rampling invited him to play at his club night Shoom. Farley and Weatherall became regular Shoom DJs, playing the upstairs room, and also at Paul Oakenfold's Future/Spectrum nights and Nicky Holloway's Trip. They also did their own parties and started a record label under the name of Boy's Own Recordings. Along with Pete Heller (who was also a Shoom DJ), engineer Hugo Nicolson and singer Anna Haigh, they released two singles as Bocca Juniors on the label, "Raise (53 Steps to Heaven)" and "Substance".

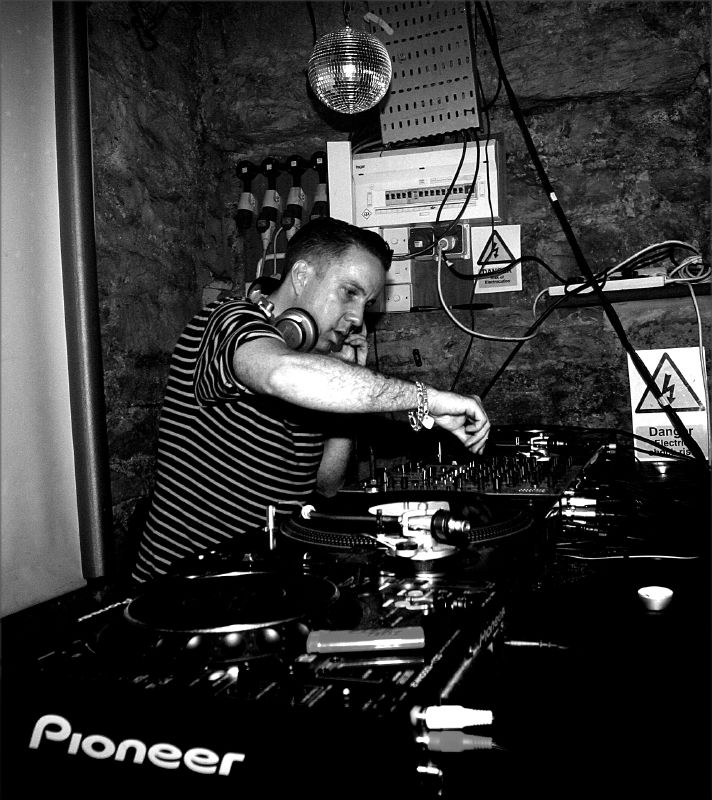
Weatherall DJing in Edinburgh, 2006

Weatherall's first studio work was alongside Paul Oakenfold on the club remix of "Hallelujah" for the Happy Mondays. Other remixes followed, notably "World in Motion" for New Order, "Loaded", a hit remix of Primal Scream's earlier track "I'm Losing More Than I'll Ever Have", and the widely acclaimed 'A Mix of Two-Halves' version of Saint Etienne's cover of Neil Young's "Only Love Can Break Your Heart". His remix of My Bloody Valentine's "Soon" was ranked at number 1 in NME's list of "The 50 Best Remixes Ever". He produced Primal Scream's album Screamadelica.

In 1992, Weatherall left Boy's Own. He formed the electronic music trio the Sabres of Paradise in 1993, starting a record label under the same name. The Sabres of Paradise released three albums between 1993 and 1995. In early 1996, after shutting down Sabresonic, Weatherall and Keith Tenniswood became Two Lone Swordsmen, signing to Warp. His production of Beth Orton's album Trailer Park helped establish the mix of hip hop and electronica that would later become trip hop. He set up the Rotters Golf Club label in 2001.

Weatherall produced for artists Beth Orton, Primal Scream and One Dove, and remixed the work of Björk, Siouxsie Sioux, the Orb, the Future Sound of London, New Order, Manic Street Preachers, My Bloody Valentine and James. He produced the album Tarot Sport for Fuck Buttons to "vast acclaim" and assisted the Twilight Sad with the production of their third studio album, No One Can Ever Know.

In 2006, he released his debut solo EP The Bullet Catcher's Apprentice, followed by his debut solo studio album A Pox on the Pioneers in 2009. Both were released on his Rotters Golf Club imprint. His music has soundtracked commercial advertisements for vehicles; Weatherall's "Feathers" was used for the Volkswagen Tiguan in 2007 and Two Lone Swordsmen's "Shack 54" was used for the Ford Fiesta in 2009. In 2013, the Asphodells, formed by Weatherall and collaborator Timothy J. Fairplay from Battant, released the album Ruled by Passion, Destroyed by Lust on Rotters Golf Club. On 1 July 2014, Weatherall began hosting a monthly radio show, Music's Not For Everyone, on NTS Radio in London. In 2016, he released a studio album Convenanza, as well as a remix album Consolamentum. In 2017, he released a studio album Qualia on Höga Nord Rekords.

Weatherall cited humour as an important component in his musical ideology. He was known as the Chairman or the Guv'nor.

== Death ==
Weatherall died from pulmonary embolism on 17 February 2020 at Whipps Cross University Hospital in London, aged 56.

== Selected discography ==
This lists works on which Weatherall appeared directly.

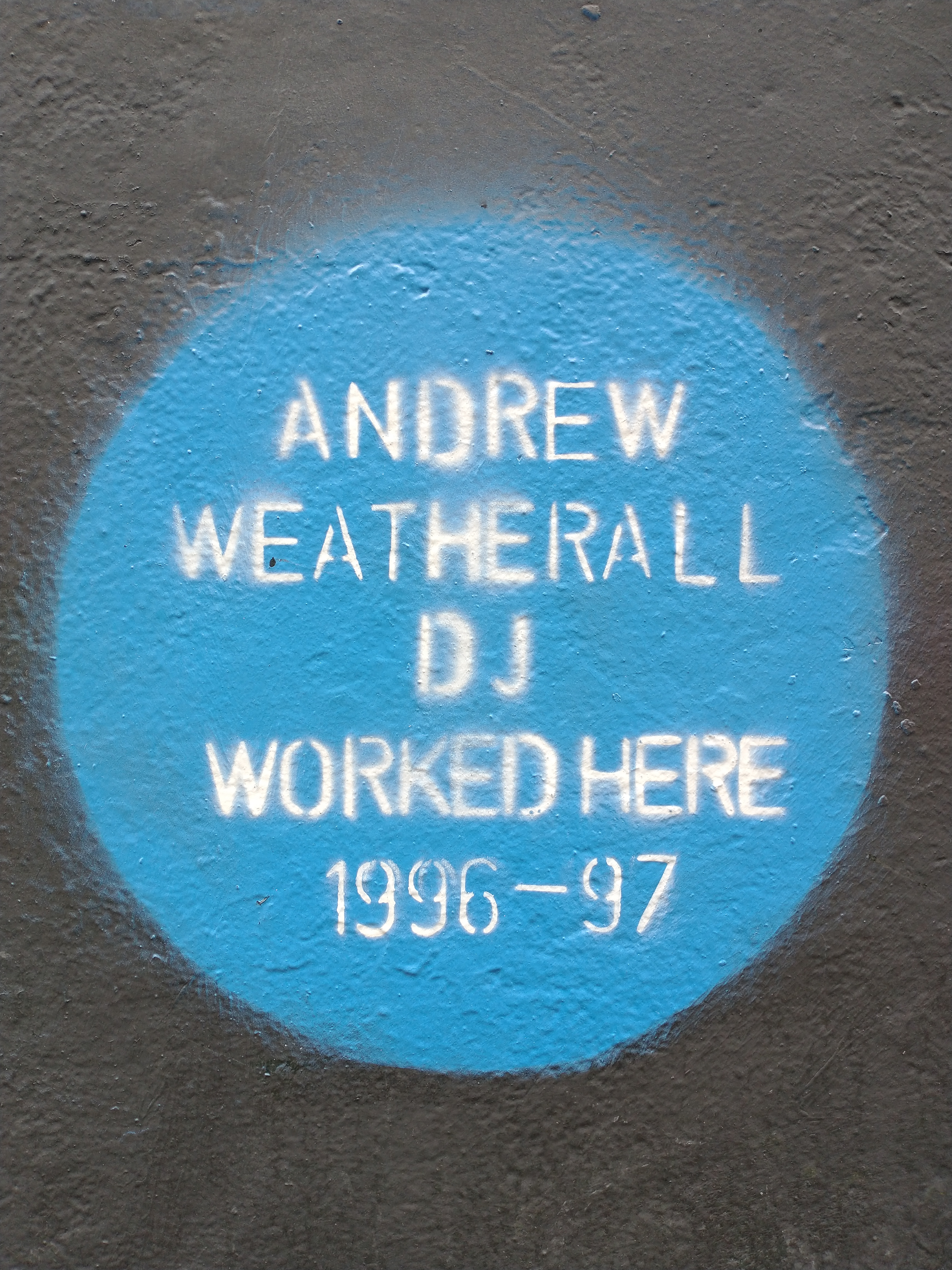
Painted "blue plaque" at the site of The Blue Note on Hoxton Square

=== Studio albums ===
- A Pox on the Pioneers (2009)
- Ruled by Passion, Destroyed by Lust (Rotters Golf Club, 2013) (with Timothy J. Fairplay, as the Asphodells)
- The Phoenix Suburb (and Other Stories) (2015) (with Nina Walsh, as the Woodleigh Research Facility)
- Convenanza (Rotters Golf Club, 2016)
- Qualia (Höga Nord, 2017)
- Phonox Nights (Facility4/K7, 2023) (with Nina Walsh, as the Woodleigh Research Facility)

=== EPs ===
- The Bullet Catcher's Apprentice (2006)
- Kiyadub EP (2017)
- Merry Mithrasmas EP (2017)
- Blue Bullet EP (2018)

=== Singles ===
- "Unknown Plunderer" / "End Times Sound" (2020)

=== Compilation appearances ===
- Nine O'Clock Drop (2000)
- Hypercity (2001)
- Machine Funk Specialists (2002)
- From the Bunker (2004)
- Fabric 19 (2004)
- Sci-Fi-Lo-Fi Vol. 1 (2007)
- Watch the Ride (2008)
- Andrew Weatherall vs the Boardroom (2008)
- Andrew Weatherall vs the Boardroom Volume 2 (2009)
- Masterpiece (2012)
- Consolamentum (2016)
