= Sean Daly =

Irish hurler (born 1972)

Personal information
- Native name: Séan Ó Dálaigh (Irish)
- Nickname: The Growler
- Born: Lismore, County Waterford

Sport
- Sport: Hurling
- Position: Full-forward
Club
- Years: Club
- Lismore GAA
Inter-county
Years	County	Apps (scores)
1993-1998	Waterford	11 (1-08)
Inter-county titles
- Munster titles: 0
- All-Irelands: 0
- All Stars: 0

Sean Daly (born 1972) is an Irish hurler who presently plays with Lismore GAA at club level and formerly with Waterford GAA at inter-county level. Sean for a time also played with Erin's Own GAA of Glounthaune, County Cork. Daly's greatest achievement was winning the All-Ireland Under-21 Hurling Championship with Waterford in 1992.

== Honours ==
- All-Ireland Under 21 Hurling Championship winner - 1992
- Munster Under-21 Hurling Championship winner - 1992
- Waterford Senior Hurling Championship winner - 1991 and 1993
- Waterford Minor Hurling Championship winner - 1990

== Championship Appearances ==
#	Date	Venue	Opponent	Score	Result	Competition	Match report
1	31/05/1992	Semple Stadium, Thurles	Clare	0-0	2-13 : 3-10	Munster Quarter-Final	Irish Times
2	24/05/1992	Semple Stadium, Thurles	Clare	0-2	0-16 : 0-14	Munster Quarter-Final Replay	Irish Times
3	14/06/1992	Semple Stadium, Thurles	Limerick	0-3	1-13 : 2-13	Munster Semi-Final	Irish Times
4	23/05/1993	Walsh Park, Waterford	Kerry	0-1	3-13 : 4-13	Munster Quarter-Final	Irish Times
5	21/05/1995	Páirc Uí Chaoimh, Cork	Tipperary	0-0	1-11 : 4-23	Munster Quarter-Final	Irish Times
6	02/06/1996	Walsh Park, Waterford	Tipperary	0-0	1-14 : 1-11	Munster Quarter-Final	Irish Times
7	24/05/1998	Austin Stack Park, Tralee	Kerry	0-0	0-20 : 1-09	Munster Quarter-Final	Irish Independent
8	12/07/1998	Semple Stadium, Thurles	Clare	0-0	3-10 : 1-16	Munster Final	Irish Independent
9	19/07/1998	Semple Stadium, Thurles	Clare	0-1	0-10 : 2-16	Munster Final Replay	Irish Independent
10	26/07/1998	Croke Park, Dublin	Galway	1-0	1-20 : 1-10	All-Ireland Quarter-Final	Irish Independent
11	16/08/1998	Croke Park, Dublin	Kilkenny	0-1	1-10 : 1-11	All-Ireland Semi-Final	Irish Independent
