= Richie Leahy =

Irish hurler (born 1997)

Personal information
- Native name: Risteard Ó Laocha (Irish)
- Born: 13 March 1997 (age 29) Inistioge, County Kilkenny, Ireland
- Occupation: Glanbia employee
- Height: 6 ft 2 in (188 cm)

Sport
- Sport: Hurling
- Position: Midfield
Club
- Years: Club
- Rower–Inistioge
Club titles
- Kilkenny titles: 0
College
- Years: College
- Institute of Technology, Carlow
College titles
- Fitzgibbon titles: 0
Inter-county*
Years	County	Apps (scores)
2017-present	Kilkenny	15 (0-15)
Inter-county titles
- Leinster titles: 0
- All-Irelands: 0
- NHL: 1
- All Stars: 0
- *Inter County team apps and scores correct as of 10:04, 15 December 2019.

Richard Leahy (born 13 March 1997) is an Irish hurler who plays for Kilkenny Senior Championship club Rower–Inistioge and at inter-county level with the Kilkenny senior hurling team. He usually lines out as a midfielder.

== Playing career ==
=== St. Kieran's College ===
Leahy first came to prominence as a hurler with St. Kieran's College in Kilkenny. Having played in every grade as a hurler, he was eventually called up the college's senior team. On 9 March 2014, Leahy was an unused substitute when St. Kieran's College suffered a 2–13 to 0–13 defeat by Kilkenny CBS in the Leinster final. On 5 April 2014, he was named on the substitutes' bench for the All-Ireland final against Kilkenny CBS. He remained as an unused substitute but collected a winners' medal following the 2–16 to 0–13 victory.

On 28 February 2015, Leahy won a Leinster Championship medal when St. Kieran's College defeated St. Peter's College by 1–14 to 1–06 in the final. He was again selected at midfield when St. Kieran's College faced Thurles CBS in the All-Ireland final. Leahy scored two points and collected a second All-Ireland medal following the 1–15 to 1–12 victory.

=== Rower-Inistioge ===
Leahy joined the Rower–Inistioge club at a young age and played in all grades at juvenile and underage levels. On 27 October 2013, he won a Kilkenny Minor Championship medal after lining out at left wing-forward in a 2–09 to 1–07 defeat of O'Loughlin Gaels in the final.

=== Kilkenny ===
==== Minor and under-21 ====
Leahy first played for Kileknny as a member of the minor team during the 2015 Leinster Championship. He made his first appearance for the team on 25 April 2015 and scored a point from midfield in a 1–18 to 1–17 defeat of Wexford. Leahy was again at midfield when Kilkenny faced Dublin in the Leinster final on 5 July 2015. He ended the game as man of the match after scoring four points in the 1–17 to 1–15 victory.

Leahy was drafted onto the Kilkenny under-21 team for the 2017 Leinster Championship. After missing Kilkenny's opening game through injury he made his debut on 21 June 2017 in a 1–21 to 1–11 defeat of Westmeath. On 5 July 2017, Leahy won a Leinster Championship medal following Kilkenny's 0–30 to 1–15 defeat of Wexford in the final. On 9 September 2017, he lined out at midfield when Kilkenny suffered a 0–17 to 0–11 defeat by Limerick in the All-Ireland final.

Leahy was once again eligible for the under-21 grade in 2018. He made his final appearance for the team on 20 June 2018 when he scored three points from midfield in a 1–17 to 3–13 defeat by Galway in the semi-final.

==== Intermediate ====
Leahy was added to the Kilkenny intermediate team in advance of the 2016 Leinster Championship. On 13 July 2016, he won a Leinster Championship after scoring 1-01 from play in Kilkenny's 3–14 to 2–14 defeat of Wexford in the final. Leahy lined out at left wing-forward for the All-Ireland final against Clare on 6 August 2016 and ended the game with a winners' medal after a 5–16 to 1–16 victory.

==== Senior ====
Leahy was added to the Kilkenny senior team in advance of the 2017 National League. He made his first appearance for the team on 12 February 2017 when he came on as a 56th-minute substitute for Pat Lyng in a 1–15 to 0–17 defeat by Waterford.

On 8 April 2018, Leahy lined out at midfield when Kilkenny faced Tipperary in the National League final. He ended the game with a winners' medal after scoring a point in the 2–23 to 2–17 victory. Leahy was switched to left wing-forward on 1 July 2018 when Kilkenny drew 0-18 apiece with Galway in the Leinster final. He retained his position for the replay a week later, however, Kilkenny suffered a 1–28 to 3–15 defeat.

On 30 June 2019, Leahy lined out at right wing-forward when Kilkenny suffered a 1–23 to 0–23 defeat by Wexford in the Leinster final. On 18 August 2019, Leahy was listed amongst the substitutes when Kilkenny faced Tipperary in the All-Ireland final. He was introduced as a substitute for Cillian Buckley at midfield but ended the game on the losing side after a 3–25 to 0–20 defeat.

== Career statistics ==
As of match played 18 August 2019.

Team	Year	National League			Leinster		All-Ireland		Total	
Team	Year	Division	Apps	Score	Apps	Score	Apps	Score	Apps	Score
Kilkenny	2017	Division 1A	3	0-04	0	0-00	1	0-02	4	0-06
Kilkenny	2018	Division 1A	7	0-10	6	0-03	1	0-04	14	0-17
Kilkenny	2019	Division 1A	6	1-10	5	0-05	2	0-01	13	1-16
Career total			16	1-24	11	0-08	4	0-07	31	1-39

== Honours ==
St. Kieran's College

- All-Ireland Colleges Senior Hurling Championship (2): 2014, 2015
- Leinster Colleges Senior Hurling Championship (1): 2015

Rower–Inistioge

- Kilkenny Under-21 Hurling Championship (1): 2016
- Kilkenny Minor Hurling Championship (1): 2013

Kilkenny

- National Hurling League (1): 2018
- All-Ireland Intermediate Hurling Championship (1): 2016
- Leinster Intermediate Hurling Championship (1): 2016
- Leinster Under-21 Hurling Championship (1): 2017
- Leinster Minor Hurling Championship (1): 2015
