= Willie Murphy (Kilkenny hurler) =

Irish hurler

Personal information
- Native name: Liam Ó Murchú (Irish)
- Born: Inistioge, County Kilkenny

Sport
- Sport: Hurling
- Position: Half-back
Club
- Years: Club
- Rower–Inistioge
Inter-county
- Years: County
- 1960s-1970s: Kilkenny
Inter-county titles
- Leinster titles: 2
- All-Irelands: 1

Willie Murphy is a retired Irish sportsperson. He played hurling with his local club Rower–Inistioge and was a member of the Kilkenny senior inter-county team from the 1960s until the 1970s. With Kilkenny Murphy an All-Ireland title and two Leinster titles.
