= Tom Tierney (Galway hurler) =

Irish hurler

Personal information
- Born: 6 April 1983 (age 43) Ballinasloe, County Galway, Ireland

Sport
- Sport: Hurling
- Position: Midfield
Club
- Years: Club
- Kilnadeema–Leitrim
Club titles
- Galway titles: 0
College
- Years: College
- Galway-Mayo IT
College titles
- Fitzgibbon titles: 0
Inter-county
- Years: County
- 2005: Galway
Inter-county titles
- All-Irelands: 0
- NHL: 0
- All Stars: 0

Thomas Tierney (born 4 June 1983) is an Irish hurling manager and former player. At club level, he played with Kilnadeema–Leitrim and also lined out at inter-county level with various Galway teams.

== Career ==
Tierney first played hurling to a high standard as a student at St. Brigid's Vocational School in Loughrea. He was part of the school's senior team that won back-to-back All-Ireland Vocational Schools SHC titles in 2000 and 2001. At club level, Tierney progressed to adult level with Kilnadeema–Leitrim. He captained the team to an All-Ireland Club IHC final defeat by Rower-Inistioge in 2014.

Tierney's inter-county career with Galway began at minor level. He lined out at midfield when Galway were beaten by Cork in the 2001 All-Ireland minor final. Tierney later progressed to under-21 level and was at centre-forward on the team beaten by Kilkenny in the 2003 All-Ireland under-21 final. He was a non-playing substitute when the senior team was beaten by Cork in the 2005 All-Ireland final, however, he was released from the panel the following year.

== Personal life ==
His brother, David Tierney, also lined out with Galway when they were beaten in All-Ireland finals in 2001 and 2005.

== Honours ==
St. Brigid's Vocational School

- All-Ireland Vocational Schools Senior A Hurling Championship: 2000, 2001

Kilnadeema-Leitrim

- Connacht Intermediate Club Hurling Championship: 2013 (c)
- Galway Intermediate Hurling Championship: 2013 (c)
