= Joe Lyng =

Irish hurler

Personal information
- Native name: Seosamh Ó Loinn (Irish)
- Nickname: ODLUMS
- Born: 10 April 1991 (age 35) Inistioge, County Kilkenny, Ireland
- Occupation: Student
- Height: 6 ft 2 in (188 cm)

Sport
- Sport: Hurling
- Position: Midfield
Club
- Years: Club
- 2011-present: Rower–Inistioge
Club titles
- Kilkenny titles: 0
College
- Years: College
- University College Dublin
Inter-county*
Years	County	Apps (scores)
2014-present	Kilkenny	0 (0-00)
Inter-county titles
- Leinster titles: 1
- All-Irelands: 2
- NHL: 0
- All Stars: 0
- *Inter County team apps and scores correct as of 14:35, 10 August 2015.

Joseph Lyng (born 10 April 1991) is an Irish hurler who currently plays as a midfielder for the Kilkenny senior team.

Born in Inistioge, County Kilkenny, Lyng first played competitive hurling in his youth. He enjoyed Leinster success at colleges level with Good Counsel College. An All-Ireland medallist in the intermediate with Rower–Inistioge, Lyng has also won one Leinster medal and one championship medal.

Lyng made his debut on the inter-county scene at the age of eighteen when he first linked up with the Kilkenny minor team. An All-Ireland runner-up in this grade, he was later an All-Ireland runner-up with the under-21 team and an All-Ireland runner-up with the intermediate team. Lyng joined the extended senior panel during the 2014 championship.

His acting success include playing Lorcan Meehan, son of Carol Meehan in Fair City from 2002 to 2007.

== Honours ==
=== Team ===
==== Good Counsel College ====
- Leinster Colleges Senior Hurling Championship (1): 2009

==== Rower–Inistioge ====
- All-Ireland Intermediate Club Hurling Championship (1): 2014
- Leinster Intermediate Club Hurling Championship (1): 2013
- Kilkenny Intermediate Hurling Championship (1): 2013

==== Kilkenny ====
- Leinster Intermediate Hurling Championship (1): 2012
- Leinster Under-21 Hurling Championship (1): 2012
- Leinster Minor Hurling Championship (1): 2009
