= George Brown (communist) =

Irish activist and trade unionist

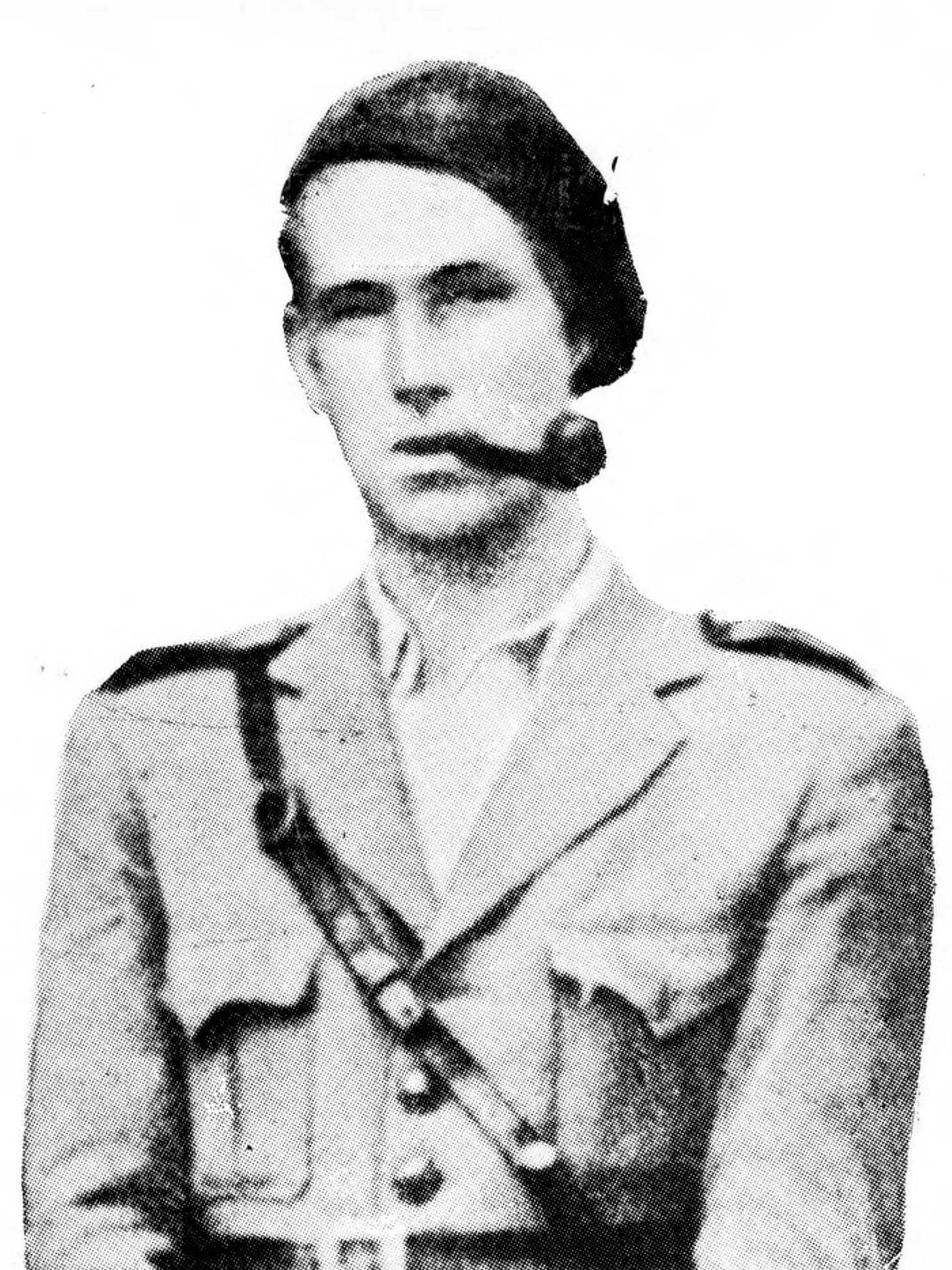
- Brown in Spain, 1937
- Born: 5 October 1906; Inistioge, County Kilkenny, Ireland
- Died: 7 July 1937 (aged 30); Villanueva de la Cañada, Madrid, Spain
- Cause of death: Killed in action
- Political party: Communist Party of Great Britain
- Spouse: Evelyn Mary Taylor
- Military Career
- Allegiance: Spanish Republic
- Branch: International Brigades
- Unit: British Battalion of the "Abraham Lincoln" XV International Brigade
- Conflicts: Spanish Civil War

George Brown (5 November 1906 – 7 July 1937) was an Irish born communist activist and trade unionist who was based in Manchester, England for most of his life. He was a brigadista in the International Brigades fighting on the Republican side in the Spanish Civil War and was killed in the Battle of Brunete in 1937.

== Biography ==
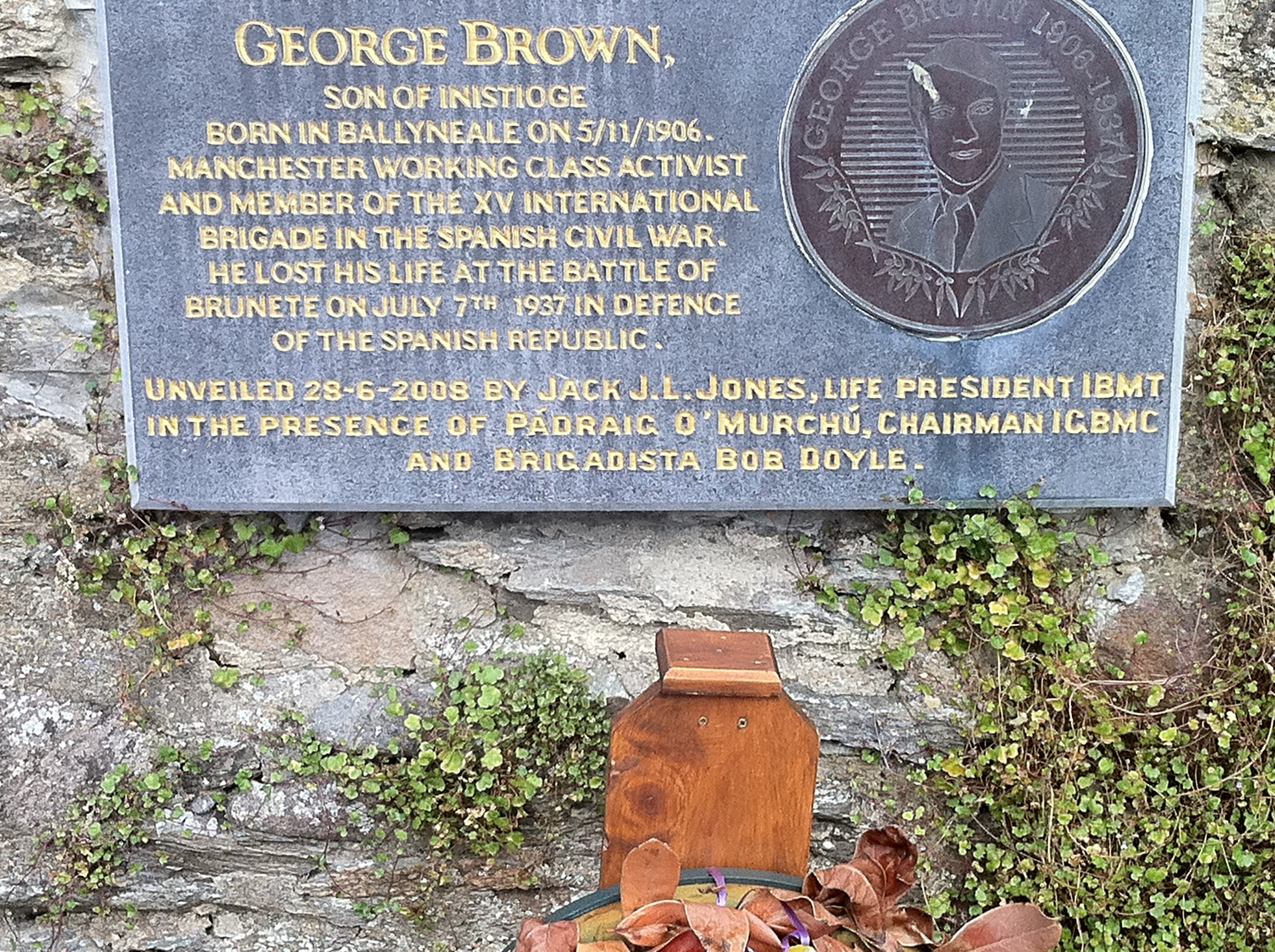
Memorial to George Brown, Inistioge, Kilkenny

Brown was born on 5 November 1906 at Ballyneale on the outskirts of the village of Inistioge, County Kilkenny, Ireland. His parents were Francis Brown and Mary (née Lackey) who came home to Inistioge specifically for George to be born there. They later returned to their adopted home of Manchester where George grew up. He began working at the age of 14 or younger as a weaver and later worked as a labourer in a number of employments. He was heavily influenced by the harsh conditions for workers in Britain at the time and soon joined the trade union movement. The 1926 British General Strike was a turning point in his life and his experience there led to him joining the Communist Party of Great Britain. In 1931 he went to Soviet Russia to spend a year studying at the International Lenin School in Moscow. He would later represent that party in the 1934 local elections in the Openshaw ward. His director of elections Evelyn Mary Taylor would later become his wife. Brown became more and more active in the Communist Party and was elected to its national executive committee in 1935.

In 1936 with the outbreak of the Spanish Civil War Brown was one of the hundreds of communists in Britain and around the world to volunteer to fight fascism and joined the International Brigades to join the fight for the Spanish Republic. During his time in Spain Brown became a political commissar. Brown was killed during fighting for control of Madrid on 7 July 1937, during the Battle of Brunete.

An annual memorial weekend has been held in Brown's honour in his native Inistioge since 2008.
