= Saint Columbkill's Well, Inistioge =

Holy well in Inistioge, County Kilkenny, Ireland

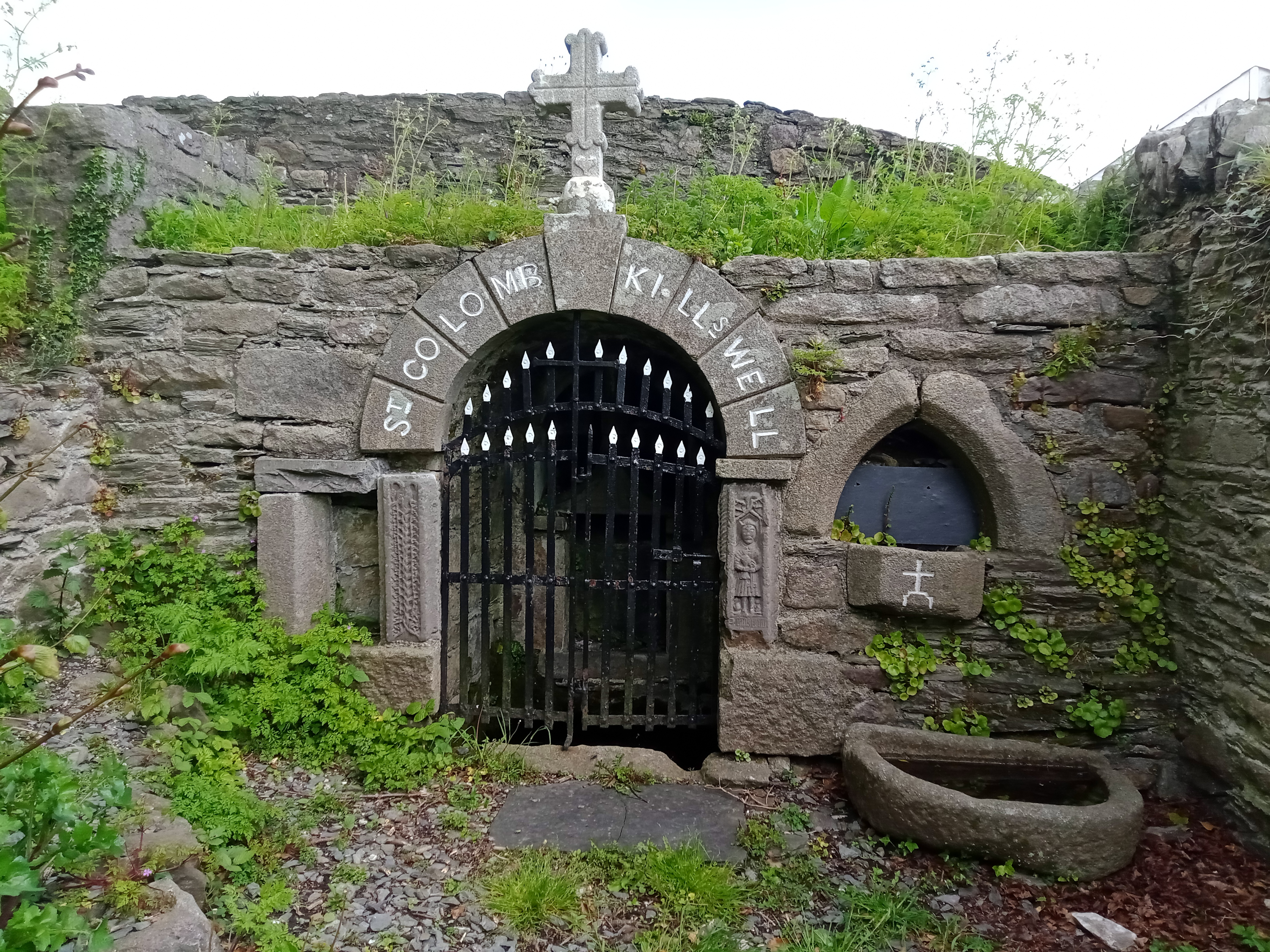
Saint Columbkille's Well, Inistioge

Saint Columbkille's Well, also known as St Colombkille's Well or simply Columbkille's Well (Irish: Tobar Naomh Colmcille), is a holy well in Inistioge, County Kilkenny in Ireland. Dedicated to Saint Colomba, it is included in the Record of Monuments and Places as record number "KK032-017011-".

The holy well is located above Hatchery Lane and accessible via a flight of steps from Hatchery Lane in Inistioge. In John G. A. Prim's Nooks and Corners of the County Kilkenny (1848), the well's location is described as: "opposite the Moat the track of a tiny streamlet leads up the hill-side to the Holy Well of St. Columb". An information panel at the start of Hatchery Lane states that it was the source of water for the monks in the Augustinian priory which was built in 1206.

Several architectural elements from the Augustinian priory were recycled in the construction of the well house, such as a font (KK032-017017-) and an architectural fragment (KK032-017018-). Some sources date these carved fragments, "salvaged" from the priory, to the 16th century,

The feast day of Saint Columbkill, 9 June, has historically been celebrated at the well.

== Folklore ==
The holy well has several mentions in the Dúchas.ie "Schools' Collection". One account states that the well was dedicated to Colm Cille because "he visited it one time and blessed it", while another suggests that he visited the well several times. Some accounts describes the well as being decorated with candles and flowers each year, while another states that "Saint Colmcilles head and an Angel is carved on a stone" at the well.

Several accounts refer to the well's water as having healing powers, with one such account stating that it cured a local woman of a rheumatic finger.

According to these accounts, the residents of Hatchery Lane used the water for domestic purposes and also refer to fish (possibly trout) living in the well. Of these fish, one account states that "it was in 1863 not long before it was blessed by another priest and a fish was put in it". At least two accounts state that well was blessed by a Father William Martin in 1863.

== Gallery ==
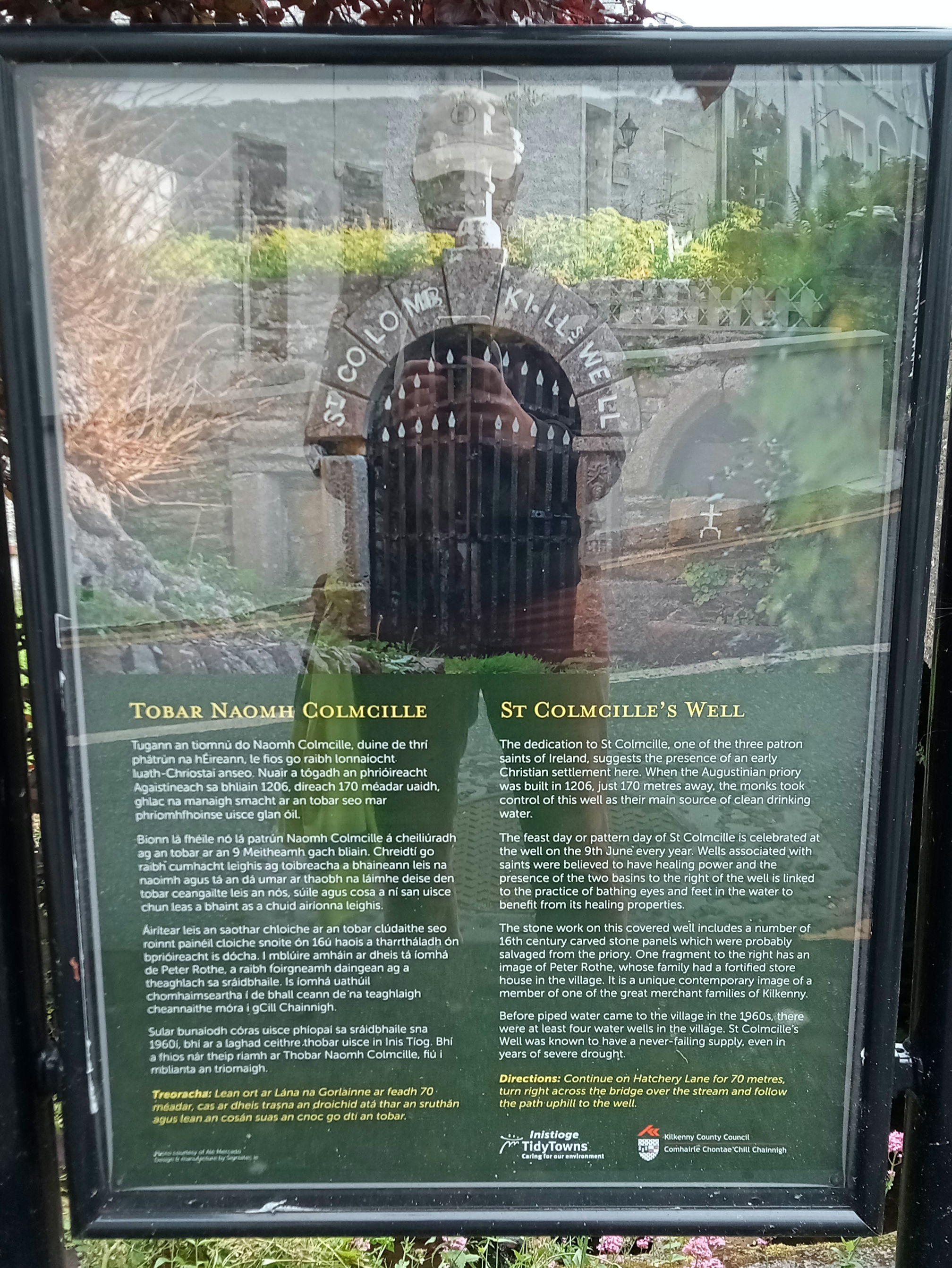
Information board

Video of the approach of the well and architectural details
