= Tom Malone (hurler) =

Irish hurler

Personal information
- Nationality: Irish
- Born: 1952 (age 72–73)

Sport
- Sport: Hurling

Thomas Malone (born 1952) was an Irish hurler who played for club Kilkenny Championship club Rower–Inistioge. He played for the Kilkenny senior hurling team for a brief period, during which time he usually lined out as a forward.

== Honours ==
Kilkenny

- All-Ireland Senior Hurling Championship (1): 1979
- Leinster Senior Hurling Championship (1): 1979
