= Pat Lyng =

Irish hurler

Personal information
- Native name: Pádraig Ó Loinn (Irish)
- Born: 2 December 1996 (age 29) Inistioge, County Kilkenny, Ireland
- Occupation: Student
- Height: 6 ft 0 in (183 cm)

Sport
- Sport: Hurling
- Position: Left wing-forward
Club
- Years: Club
- Rower–Inistioge
Club titles
- Kilkenny titles: 0
Inter-county*
Years	County	Apps (scores)
2017-present	Kilkenny	0 (0-00)
Inter-county titles
- Leinster titles: 0
- All-Irelands: 0
- NHL: 1
- All Stars: 0
- *Inter County team apps and scores correct as of 15:09, 27 February 2018.

Patrick Lyng (born 2 December 1996) is an Irish hurler who plays as a left wing-forward for the Kilkenny senior team.

Born in Inistioge, County Kilkenny, Lyng first played competitive hurling at juvenile and underage levels with the Rower–Inistioge club, winning minor and under-21 championship medals.

Lyng made his debut on the inter-county scene at the age of seventeen when he was selected for the Kilkenny minor team. He enjoyed one championship season with the minor team, culminating with the winning of an All-Ireland medal in 2014. He subsequently joined the Kilkenny under-21 team, winning a Leinster medal in 2017. Lyng made his debut with the Kilkenny senior team during the 2017 league.

== Career statistics ==
As of match played 25 February 2018.

Team	Year	National League			Leinster		All-Ireland		Total	
Team	Year	Division	Apps	Score	Apps	Score	Apps	Score	Apps	Score
Kilkenny	2017	Division 1A	2	0-01	0	0-00	0	0-00	2	0-01
Kilkenny	2018	Division 1A	4	0-03	0	0-00	0	0-00	4	0-03
Total			6	0-04	0	0-00	0	0-00	6	0-04

== Honours ==
Rower–Inistioge

- Kilkenny Under-21 Hurling Championship (1): 2017
- Kilkenny Minor Hurling Championship (1): 2013

Kilkenny

- National Hurling League (1): 2018
- Leinster Under-21 Hurling Championship (1): 2017
- All-Ireland Minor Hurling Championship (1): 2014
- Leinster Minor Hurling Championship (1): 2014
