= 2013–14 All-Ireland Intermediate Club Hurling Championship =

Championship Details
- Dates: 6 October 2013 – 8 February 2014
- Teams: 24

All Ireland Champions
- Winners: Rower-Inistioge (1 win)
- Captain: Michael Grace
- Manager: Ger Morrissey

All Ireland Runners-up
- Runners-up: Kilnadeema-Leitrim
- Captain: Tom Tierney
- Manager: Pat Donohoe

Provincial Champions
- Munster: Youghal
- Leinster: Rower-Inistioge
- Ulster: Clooney Gaels
- Connacht: Kilnadeema-Leitrim

Championship Statistics
- Matches Played: 24
- Top Scorer: Brendan Ring (0-33)

The 2013–14 All-Ireland Intermediate Club Hurling Championship was the tenth staging of the All-Ireland Intermediate Club Hurling Championship since its establishment by the Gaelic Athletic Association in 2004.

The All-Ireland final was played on 8 February 2014 at Croke Park in Dublin, between Rower-Inistioge from Kilkenny and Kilnadeema-Leitrim from Galway. Clara won the match by 1–16 to 1–09 to claim their first All-Ireland title.

Youghal's Brendan Ring was the championship's top scorer with 0-33.

== Connacht Intermediate Club Hurling Championship ==
=== Connacht semi-final ===
28 October 2013 Semi-final	Four Roads	2–09 – 0–16	Tooreen	Athleague Sportsfield
	J Coyne 1-2, M Kelly 1-0, D Dolan 0-3, J Lawlor 0-2, J Moran 0-1, S Beirne 0-1.		K Feeney 0-11, F Boland 0-2, S Coyne 0-2, P Hunt 0-1.

=== Connacht final ===
17 November 2013 Final	Kilnadeema-Leitrim	1–14 – 2–09	Tooreen	Athleague Sportsfield
	B Molloy 0-11, D Tierney 1-0, S Lawless 0-3.		K Feeney 2-3, F Boland 0-3, C Freeman 0-2, R Larkin 0-1.

== Leinster Intermediate Club Hurling Championship ==
=== Leinster quarter-finals ===
26 October 2013 Quarter-final	Buffer's Alley	1–19 – 3–04	Glenealy	Buffer's Alley Grounds
	P Doran 0-6, W Doran 1-0, A Kenny 0-3, K Burke 0-3, T O'Leary 0-2, C Foley 0-2, P Roche 0-1, S Grannell 0-1, S Óg Whelan 0-1.		S Nolan 2-0, J O'Neill 1-3, J Manley 0-1.

26 October 2013 Quarter-final	Parnells	2–09 – 0–18	Kilmessan	Chanel College
		Report	S Clynch 0-8, D Reilly 0-5, N Horan 0-3, C Keena 0-1, R Donnelly 0-1.

27 October 2013 Quarter-final	Celbridge	2–16 – 0–04	St Lazarian's Abbeyleix	St Conleth's Park
	B White 0-7, T Butler 1-2, D Butler 1-1, D Kirwan 0-2, M Moloney 0-1, G Keegan 0-1, F Conway 0-1, M Kinsella 0-1.		D Shanahan 0-2, J Bergin 0-1, E Fennelly 0-1.

=== Leinster semi-finals ===
10 November 2013 Semi-final	Kilmessan	3–10 – 3–13	Buffer's Alley	St Loman's Park
	N Horan 1-2, G O'Neill 1-2, S Clynch 1-1, D Reilly 0-4, K Keena 0-1.		K Burke 0-11, P Roche 2-0, A Kenny 1-1, S Grannell 0-1.

10 November 2013 Semi-final	Celbridge	0–13 – 1–14	Rower-Inistioge	St Conleth's Park
	B White 0-5, N Ó Muineacháin 0-1, M Moloney 0-1, S Cotter 0-1, F Conway 0-1, D Butler 0-1, G Keegan 0-1, T Murphy 0-1, N Kenny 0-1.		M Grace 0-7, J Cashin 1-0, C Joyce 0-2, K Joyce 0-1, J Lyng 0-1, D Lyng 0-1, P Tierney 0-1, C Bolger 0-1.

=== Leinster final ===
24 November 2013 Final	Buffer's Alley	0–10 – 1–09	Rower-Inistioge	Bellefield Grounds
	A Kenny 0-5, K Burke 0-2, T Dempsey 0-1, S Grannell 0-1, T O'Leary 0-1.		D Lyng 1-0, C Bolger 0-2, S Lyster 0-1, C Joyce 0-1, J Lyng 0-1, C Ryan 0-1, K Joyce 0-1, M Grace 0-1, P Sheehan 0-1.

== Munster Intermediate Club Hurling Championship ==
=== Munster quarter-finals ===
27 October 2013 Quarter-final	Youghal	4–13 – 1–12	Ardmore	Páirc Uí Rinn
	A Frahill-O’Connor (1-3), A Curtin (1-1), L Desmond (0-4, three frees), C O’Mahony and O Dempsey (1-0 each), B Ring (0-3), B Cooper (0-2).	Report	S Prendergast (0-9, five frees), J Gartland (1-1), M Cronin and S Keating (0-1 each).	Referee: F Horgan (Tipperary)

27 October 2013 Quarter-final	Dromin-Athlacca	0–14 – 1–12	Ballina	Bruff Grounds
	D Reidy 0-5 (0-4 frees), M Reidy, J Kelleher 0-2 each, P Ryan, P Neenan (free), T Ryan, E O’Leary, J Lenihan 0-1 each.	Report	M Breen 0-5 (0-4 frees), S McKeogh 1-0, D Hickey 0-3, S O’Brien 0-2, B O’Connor, B Stritch 0-1 each.	Referee: P Casey (Waterford)

=== Munster semi-finals ===
3 November 2013 Semi-final	Whitegate	0–18 – 0–18 (aet)	Youghal	O'Garney Park
	G Waterstone (0-7, 5fs), A Fahy (0-6, 4fs), I Fahy, C Burke (0-2 each), E Minogue (0-1).	Report	L Desmond (4f), B Ring (3f) (0-5 each), A Curtin (0-3), B Cooper, D Ring (2f) (0-2 each), A Frahill O’Connor (0-1).	Referee: S Hourigan (Limerick)

3 November 2013 Semi-final	Ballina	3–19 – 0–15	St Brendan's, Ardfert	MacDonagh Park
	M Breen 2-7 (0-6f); S Stritch 0-4; TJ O’Connell 1-0; E Sheehy, G O’Brien and S O’Brien 0-2 each; D Hickey and D Kent 0-1 each.	Report	J Egan 0-9f; D Dineen 0-3 (0-1f); T Moloney, K Fitzgerald and D Griffin 0-1 each.	Referee: M Wadding (Waterford)

10 November 2013 Semi-final replay	Youghal	1–16 – 0–08	Whitegate	Páirc Mac Gearailt
	B Ring 0-6, A Curtin 1-0, O Dempsey 0-3, J O'Mahony 0-2, A Frahill-O'Connor 0-2, D Ring 0-2, B Cooper 0-1.		G Waterstone 0-4, C Burke 0-2, M O'Brien 0-1, E Quirke 0-1.

=== Munster final ===
17 November 2013 Final	Youghal	2–13 – 2–10	Ballina	Mallow GAA Complex
	Brendan Ring 0-7 (4fs), D Ring 1-1, O Dempsey 1-0, B Cooper 0-2, J O'Mahony, L Desmond and A Curtin 0-1 each.	Report	S Stritch 1-1, M Breen 0-4 (3fs, 1 '65'), D McKeown 1-0, S O'Brien 0-2 (1 '65'), D Hickey, B Stritch and TJ O'Connell 0-1 each.	Referee: S Hourigan (Limerick)

== Ulster Intermediate Club Hurling Championship ==
=== Ulster quarter-finals ===
6 October 2013 Quarter-final	Na Magha	0–05 – 4–21	Eoghan Rua	Owenbeg Centre of Excellence

6 October 2013 Quarter-final	Burt	1–10 – 2–14	Clooney Gaels	O'Donnell Park

6 October 2013 Quarter-final	Cú Chulainns	4–14 – 2–07	Bredagh	St Oliver Plunkett Park
		Report

=== Ulster semi-finals ===
13 October 2013 Semi-final	Eoghan Rua	0–27 – 4–17	Clooney Gaels	St Oliver Plunkett Park
	D Casey 0-17.	Report

13 October 2013 Semi-final	Cú Chulainns	2–14 – 0–06	Inniskeen Grattans	St Oliver Plunkett Park
	P McKernan 2-3, C Coulter 0-4, G Barton 0-2, C Kane 0-2, C Toner 0-1, T Marley 0-1, T Duffy 0-1.		R Meegan 0-4, K Crawley 0-1, P Meegan 0-1.

=== Ulster final ===
29 October 2013 Final	Clooney Gaels	1–16 – 1–14	Cú Chulainns	Celtic Park
	PJ O'Connell (1-3), G Graham (0-5), J O'Connell (0-3), M Graham (0-2); D Graham (0-1); F O'Neill (0-1); D Neeson (0-1),	Report	D Coulter (0-8); N Duffy (1-0), C Coulter (0-2), E Gribbin (0-1); C Toner (0-1), T Marley (0-1), C Gorman (0-1).

== All-Ireland Intermediate Club Hurling Championship ==
=== All-Ireland quarter-final ===
1 December 2013 Quarter-final	St. Gabriel’s	0–09 – 0–14	Youghal	Emerald GAA Grounds
	E Kelly (0-2); M Finn (0-2), K Coen (0-1), G Hennelly (0-1), S Egan (0-1), K Walsh (0-1), B Gaffney (0-1).	Report	B Ring (0-6), B Cooper (0-3); J O'Mahony (0-1), C O'Mahony (0-1), A Curtin (0-1), L Desmond (0-1); D Ring (0-1).	Referee: A Stapleton (Laois)

=== All-Ireland semi-finals ===
26 January 2014 Semi-final	Rower-Inistioge	1–14 – 0–07	Clooney Gaels	Páirc Tailteann
	M Grace 0-6 (2f/1 65), C Ryan 1-1; D Lyng 0-2; K Joyce 0-1 (1f); P Tierney 0-1; C Joyce 0-1; J Cashin 0-1.	Report	G Graham 0-3 (3f); PJ O’Connell 0-2 (1f); D Graham 0-1; D Neeson 0-1.	Referee: S Hourigan (Limerick)

1 February 2014 Semi-final	Kilnadeema-Leitrim	2–11 – 0–15	Youghal	Gaelic Grounds
	B Molloy (1-7, four frees), A Mitchell (1-0), S Lawless (0-2), D Tierney (sl) and T Tierney (0-1 each).	Report	Brendan Ring (0-6, three frees), L Desmond, B Cooper and B Coleman (0-2 each), D Ring, A Frahill-O’Connor, and C Spillane (free) (0-1 each).	Referee: T Carroll (Offaly)

=== All-Ireland final ===
8 February 2014 Final	Rower-Inistioge	1–16 – 1–09 (aet)	Kilnadeema-Leitrim	Croke Park
	P Sheehan (0-4, 0-3 frees); J Lyng, D Lyng (0-3 each); C Ryan (1-0); M Grace (0-2, 0-2 frees); J Cassin (0-2); R Galvan, C Joyce (0-1 each).		B Molloy (0-5, 0-3 frees); L Geraghty (1-1); D Herlihy (0-2); T Tierney (0-1).	Referee: F Horgan (Tipperary)

== Championship statistics ==
=== Miscellaneous ===
- The All-Ireland semi-final between Kilnadeema-Leitrim and Youghal was originally scheduled for 26 January 2014, however, the match was postponed due to an unplayable pitch at the Gaelic Grounds in Limerick.
