= Seán Cummins =

Irish hurler

Personal information
- Native name: Seán Ó Cuimin (Irish)
- Born: 1985 (age 40–41) Inistioge, County Kilkenny, Ireland

Sport
- Sport: Hurling
- Position: Right corner-back
Club
- Years: Club
- 2003-present: Rower–Inistioge
Club titles
- Kilkenny titles: 0
Inter-county*
| Years | County | Apps (scores) |
| 2006-2010 | Kilkenny | 1 (0-00) |
Inter-county titles
- Leinster titles: 0
- All-Irelands: 0
- NHL: 1
- All Stars: 0
- *Inter County team apps and scores correct as of 19:03, 25 February 2012.

Seán Cummins (born 1985) is an Irish hurler who played as a substitute right corner-back for the Kilkenny senior team.

Cummins joined the team during the 2006, however, he remained on the fringes of the team for a number of years before making his debut in 2009. As a player, he has won one All-Ireland winners' medal at intermediate level and a National League winners' medal. He has also won four All-Ireland medals at senior level as a non-playing substitute.

At club level Cummins plays hurling with Rower–Inistioge.
