= Rower–Inistioge GAA =

Gaelic games club in County Kilkenny, Ireland

Rower–Inistioge
- Robhar–Inistíog
- Founded: 1955
- County: Kilkenny
- Nickname: The Rower
- Colours
- Grounds: Inistioge
- Coordinates: 52°29′22.50″N 7°03′49.15″W

Playing kits
Standard colours

Senior Club Championships
	All Ireland	Leinster champions	Kilkenny champions
Hurling:	-	-	1

Rower–Inistioge GAA is a Gaelic Athletic Association club located in the Inistioge area of County Kilkenny, Ireland. The club is almost exclusively concerned with hurling and camogie.

== History ==
The Rower–Inistioge GAA club was formed in 1955 when the two existing GAA clubs in the local parish agreed to amalgamate. They were Rower and Inistioge.

The club is an intermediate hurling club in Kilkenny. Rower-Inistioge won the Kilkenny Intermediate Hurling Championship in 2013, beating the Emeralds in the final. They continued on to win the Leinster Intermediate and 2013–14 All-Ireland Intermediate Club Hurling Championship final. This victory is considered one of the greatest sporting achievements of recent times.

== Honours ==
- All-Ireland Intermediate Club Hurling Championship (1): 2014
- Leinster Intermediate Hurling Championship (1): 2014
- Kilkenny Senior Hurling Championships (1): 1968
- Kilkenny Intermediate Hurling Championships (1): 2013
- Kilkenny Junior Hurling Championships (2): 1944 (as The Rower), 1963
- Kilkenny Under-21 Hurling Championships (1): 2016
- Kilkenny Minor 'A' Hurling Championships (1): 2013
- Kilkenny Minor 'A' Football Championships (1): 2013
- Kilkenny Minor 'B' Football Championships (1): 2017
- Kilkenny Intermediate Camogie Championships (2): 2012, 2023

== Notable players ==
- Seán Cummins
- Kieran Joyce
- Pat Kavanagh
- Eddie Keher
- Sean Cummins
- Kieran Joyce
- Richie Leahy
- Joe Lyng
- Pat Lyng
- Tom Malone
- Tommy Murphy
- Willie Murphy
