= Inistioge =

Village in County Kilkenny, Ireland

Inistioge Irish: Inis Tíog
- Village
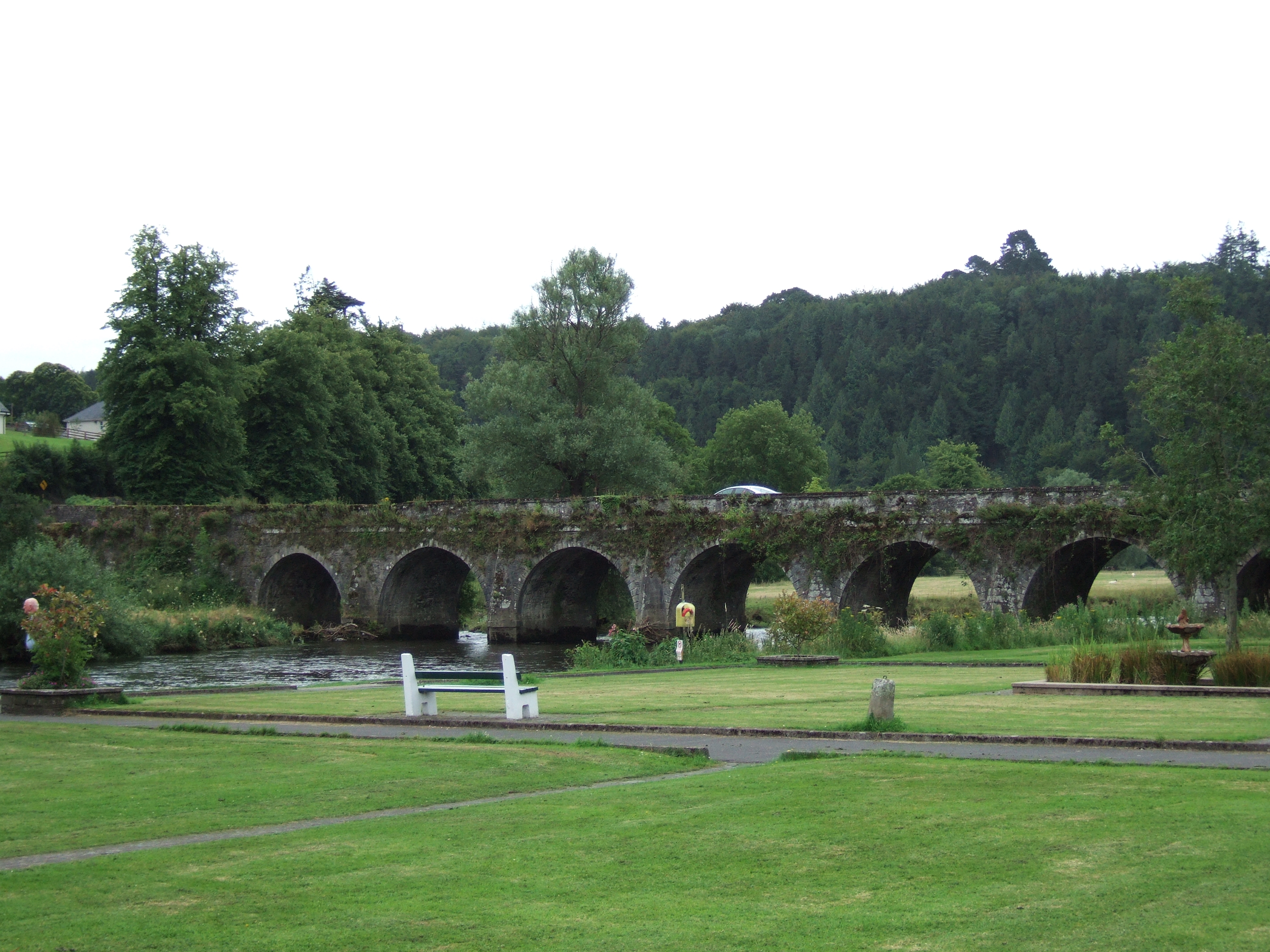
- The bridge in Inistioge

- Location in Ireland
- Coordinates: 52°29′N 7°04′W
- Country: Ireland
- Province: Leinster
- County: Kilkenny

Population (2016)
  - Total: 285
- Time zone: UTC+0 (WET)
  - Summer (DST): UTC-1 (IST (WEST))
- Website: www.inistioge.ie

Inistioge (/ɪnɪʃˈtiːɡ/; Irish: Inis Tíog) is a small village in County Kilkenny, Ireland. Historically, its name has been spelt as Ennistioge, Ennisteage, and in other ways. The village is situated on the River Nore, 25 kilometres (16 mi) southeast of Kilkenny. Inistioge is in a townland and civil parish of the same name.

Situated along the River Nore, Inistioge is entered by crossing a 10 arch stone bridge. The village has a tree-lined square and a number of 18th and 19th century homes along the river. Inistioge and its village green have been used as a filming location for a number of films. Inistioge developed significantly during the 18th and 19th centuries as a part of the Tighe families' Woodstock Estate.

== History ==
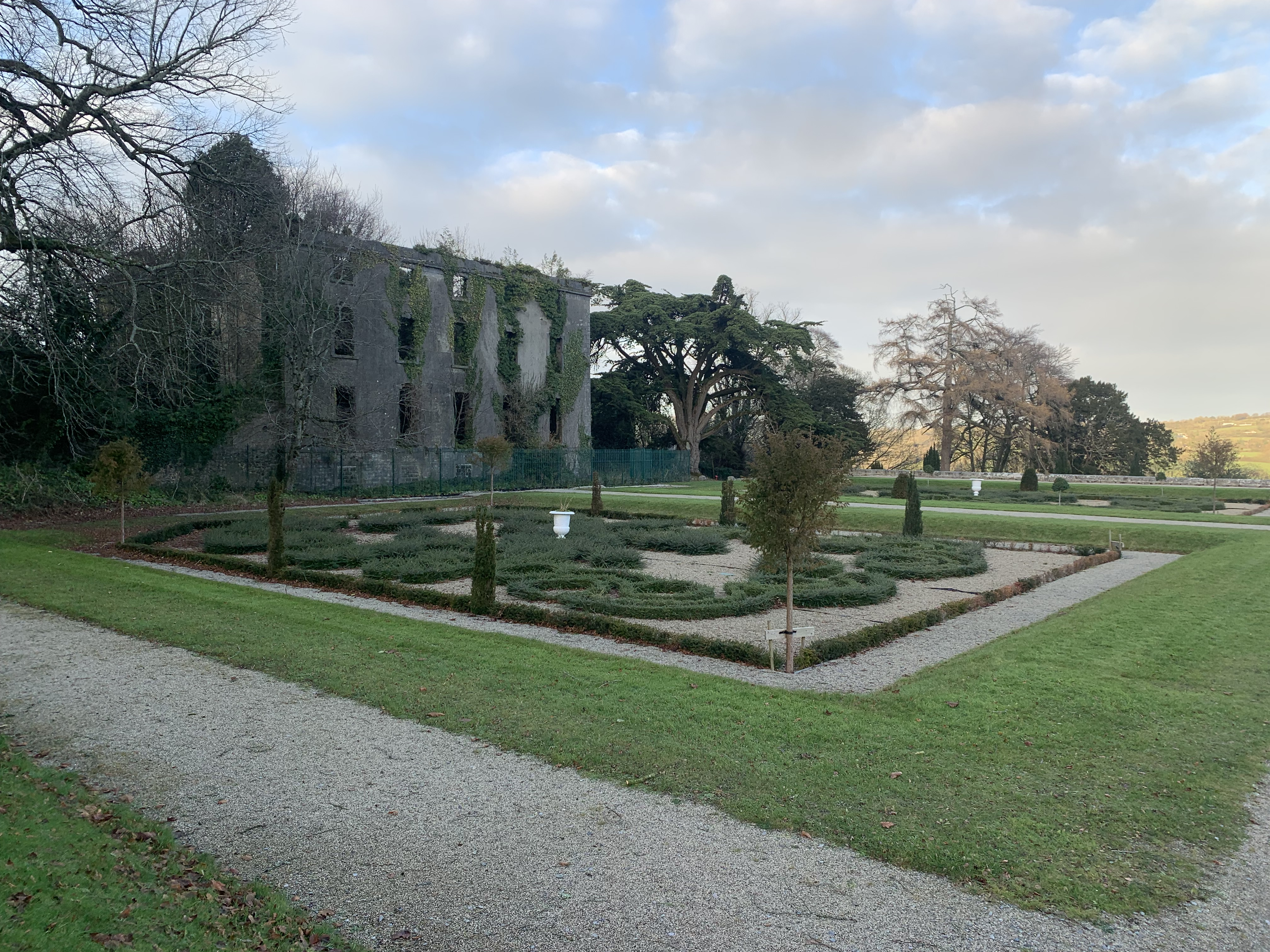
Ruins of Woodstock House

The earliest recorded reference to Inistioge refers to a battle between the kingdom of Osraighi and an army of Norsemen, recorded as taking place in the year AD 962 in the Annals of the Four Masters.

Due to its location at the lowest point of the River Nore's crossing and the fact that the Osraige fought Olaf Cuaran, King of Dublin, in Inistioge in 964, it is possible that Inistioge was first inhabited by Vikings.

Thomas FitzAnthony received the land grant in 1169, and in 1206 he founded the Augustinian Priory. The priors expanded the community, but Inistioge suffered once the monasteries were dissolved in 1540. In 1566, Sir Edmond Butler was given ownership of the priory's possessions.

James I created weekly markets on Fridays and an annual fair on 13 December after Inistioge was constituted as a town in 1608. The Cromwellians attacked the town in 1649 and eventually took it over.

The 18th and 19th centuries brought new development as the core square of the village became a planned estate village by the Tighe family of the Woodstock Estate.

The parliamentary borough of Inistioge sent two MPs to Irish House of Commons until its abolition in 1801. It was not enfranchised in the United Kingdom House of Commons.

=== Woodstock Estate ===
Inistioge's development was connected with that of the Woodstock Estate, which was constructed by Francis Bindon in the late 1740s for the Fownes family. Prior to the Land Acts, the holdings that made up the Woodstock Estate totalled 21,763 statute acres spread over six counties. Despite being far from the town, the house's significance in the growth of the community is attested to by the primary entrance to Woodstock, the river gate, the lower avenue and lodge, and the almshouses on the square. By the end of the 19th century, there was a concentration of buildings with a large number of two and three storey structures due to the interaction of the steep hill and the earlier medieval walled village design. In the centre of the village square there is a fountain which Lady Louisa Tighe (1803-1900), who spent seventy-five years at Woodstock, erected in memory of her late husband. The base of a cross, erected in 1621 to the memory of Baron David Fitzgerald and his wife, is nearby. The cross itself went missing and is said to have been deliberately destroyed by the Yeoman in 1798. The fountain still stands today, and it is inscribed “Erected by Louisa M. Tighe in memory of her beloved husband A.D. 1879”.

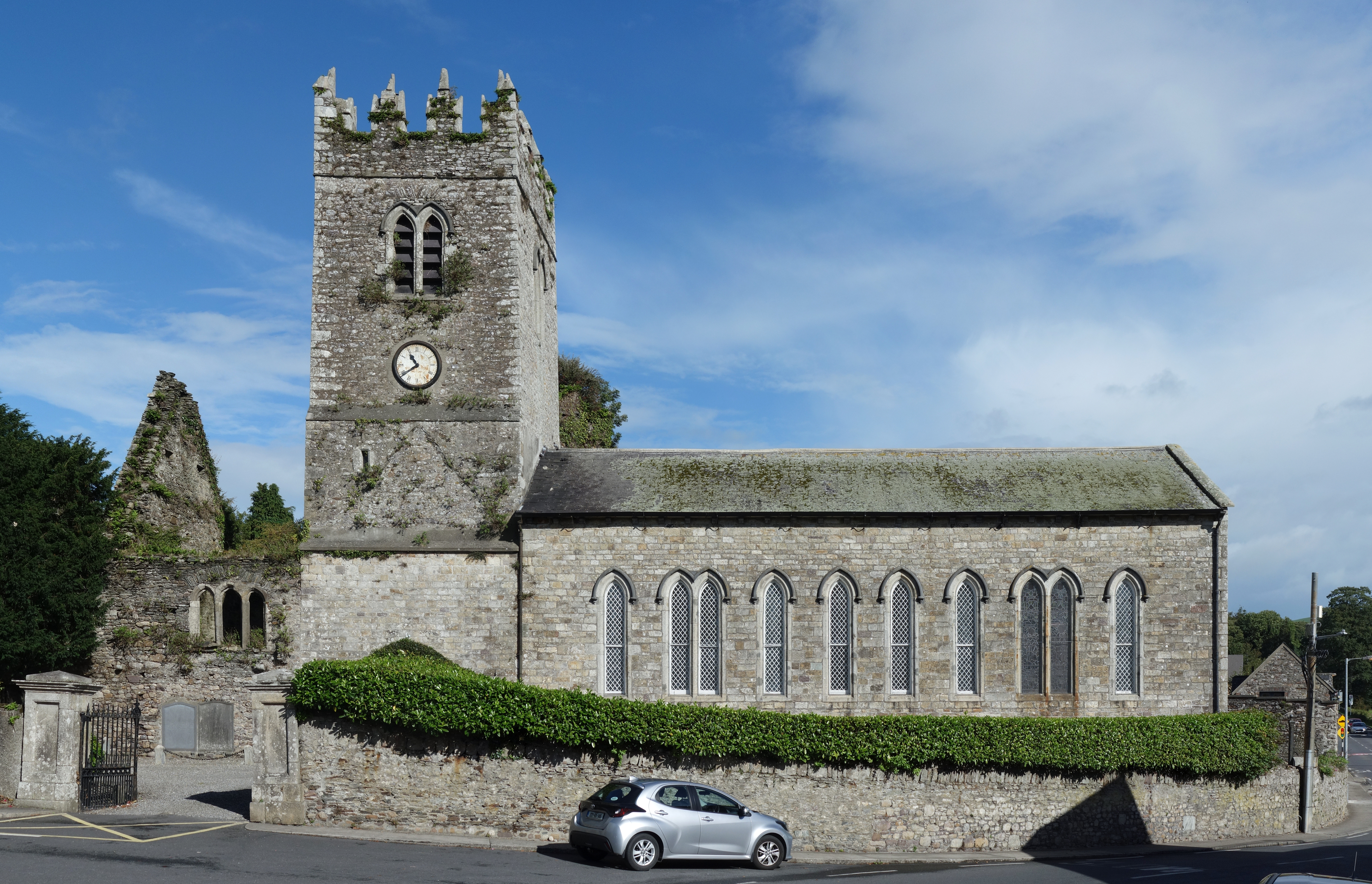
St Marys Church in Inistioge (built 1824)

== Public transport ==
The main bus route serving the village is Kilbride Coaches' New Ross - Thomastown - Kilkenny route. Bus Éireann route 374 provides a journey in each direction along the New Ross - Thomastown - Kilkenny route. Bus Éireann and JJ Kavanagh and Sons operate several journeys daily from Thomastown (8.5 kilometres away) to Dublin, Dublin Airport, Carlow and Waterford. Bus services to Rosslare Europort are available from New Ross.

The nearest station is Thomastown railway station (located at 52.523°N 7.14891°W) on the Waterford-Kilkenny-Dublin line.

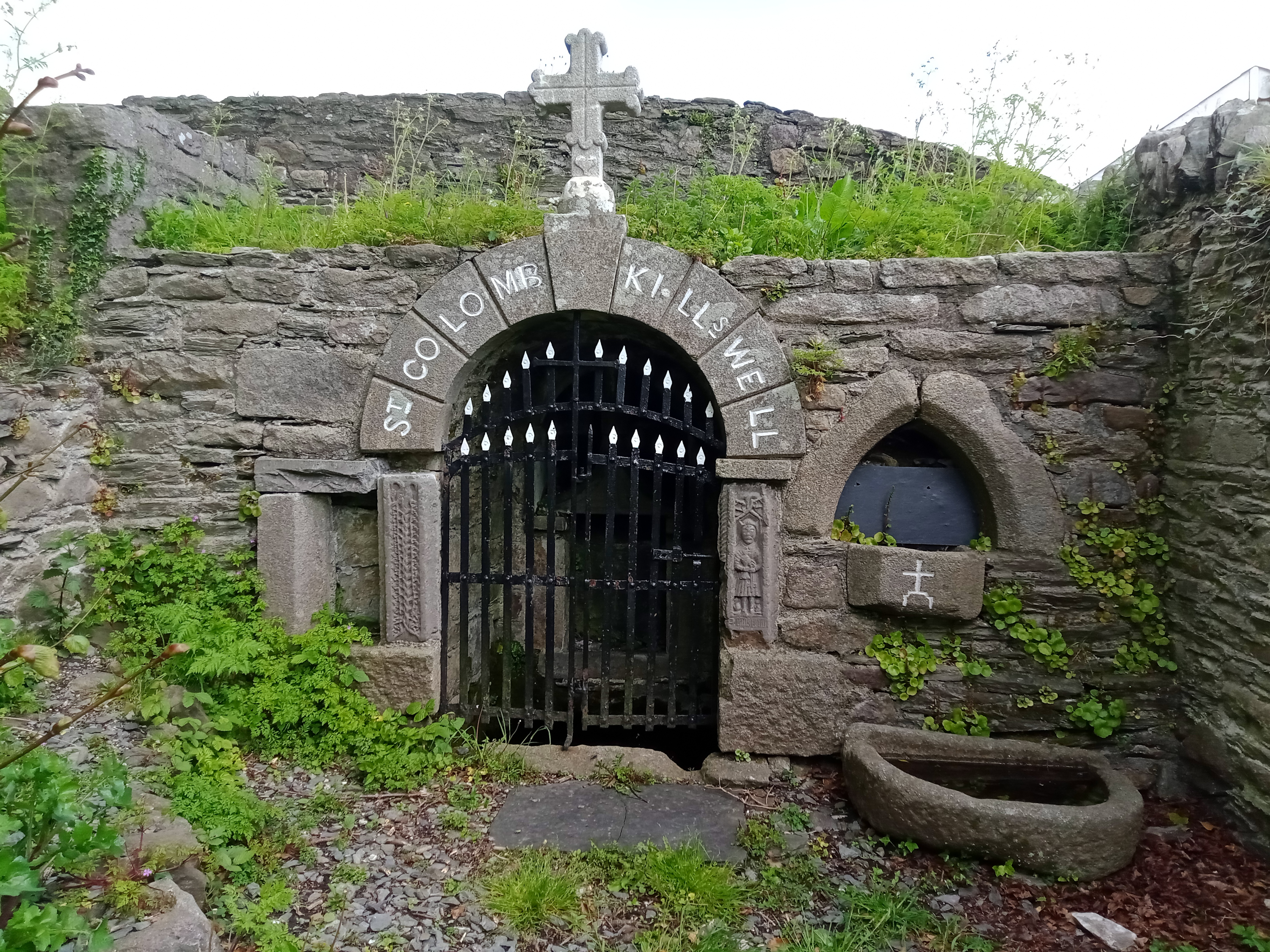
Saint Columbkille's Holy Well

== Film ==
Inistioge, and its village green, has been the scene for a number of films, including Circle of Friends, The Secret Scripture and Widows' Peak. Segments of the Hallmark movie Love's Portrait, released in September 2022, were filmed in Inistioge.

== Sport ==
The Gaelic Athletic Association club Rower–Inistioge GAA has its home ground here. The club has had a number of All Ireland medal-winning players including Sean Cummins, Kieran Joyce, and Eddie Keher.

== Notable people ==
- George Browne (1906–1937), a Manchester-based communist and member of the International Brigades in the Spanish Civil War, was born at Ballyneale outside Inistioge. Killed in the 1937 Battle of Brunete, a George Brown memorial weekend has been held annually in Inistioge since 2008.
- Walter Hamilton V.C. (1856–1879), lieutenant in the Corps of Guides during the Second Anglo-Afghan War, came from Inistioge.
- Iarla Ó Lionáird (b.1963), Irish folk musician.
- Nora Sands, of Jamie's School Dinners, is a native of the area.
- Peter Smithwick (1937–2022), judge and former District Court president.

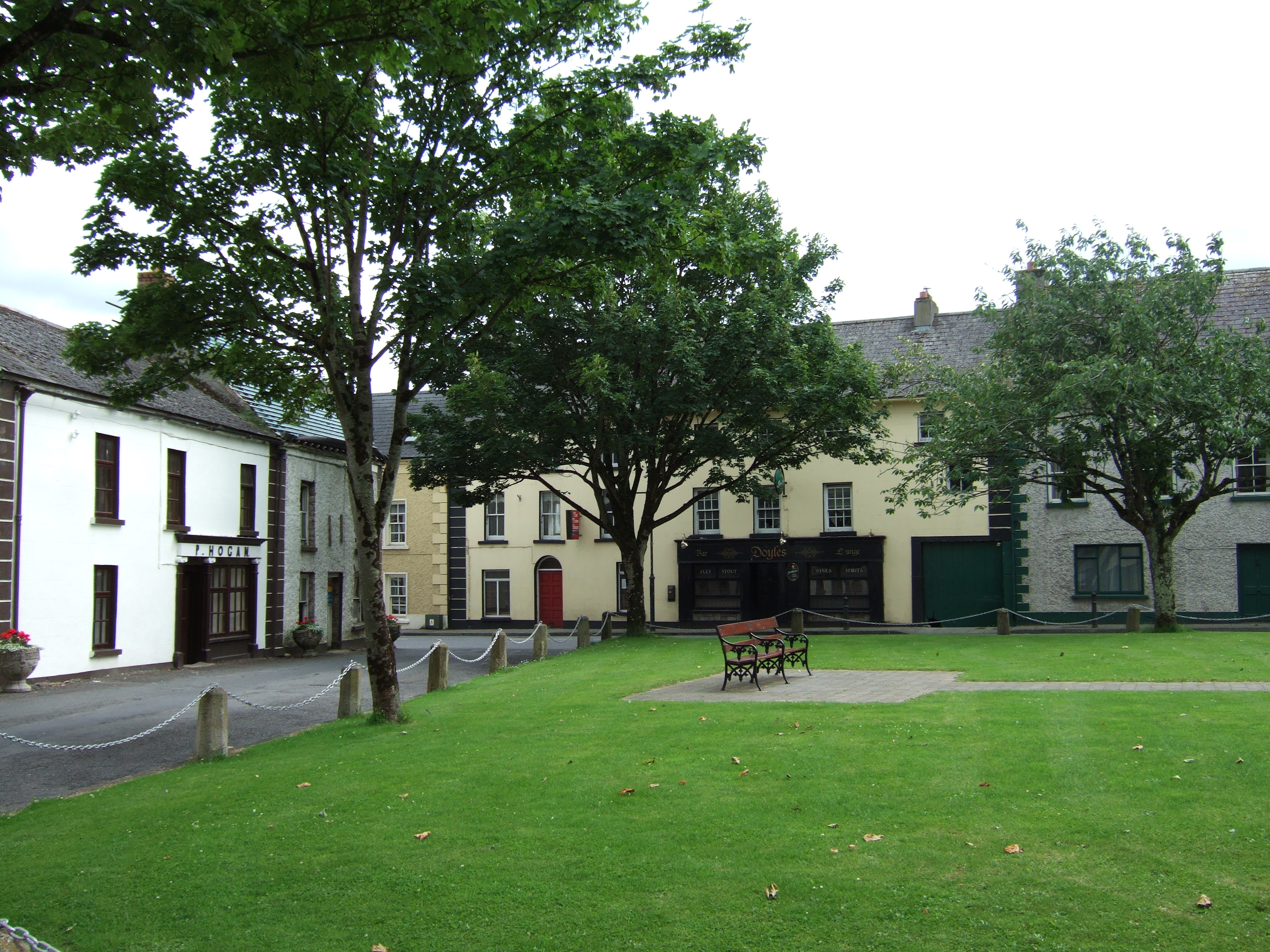
Inistioge village green

== See also ==
- List of abbeys and priories in Ireland (County Kilkenny)
- List of towns and villages in Ireland
- Saint Columbkill's Well, Inistioge
