= Kevin Foley (hurler) =

Irish hurler from Wexford

Personal information
- Native name: Caoimhín Ó Foghlú (Irish)
- Born: 5 February 1995 (age 31) Enniscorthy, County Wexford, Ireland
- Height: 5 ft 9 in (175 cm)

Sport
- Sport: Hurling
- Position: Midfield
Club
- Years: Club
- Rapparees Starlights
Club titles
| | Football | Hurling |
| Wexford titles | 1 | 0 |
Inter-county*
| Years | County | Apps (scores) |
| 2015-present | Wexford | 15 (0-05) |
Inter-county titles
- Leinster titles: 1
- All-Irelands: 0
- NHL: 0
- All Stars: 0
- *Inter County team apps and scores correct as of 16:47, 1 July 2019.

Kevin Foley (born 5 February 1995) is an Irish hurler who plays for Wexford Senior Championship club Rapparees and at inter-county level with the Wexford senior hurling team. He is usually selected at midfield but generally operates as a sweeper. Kevin studied at St. Patrick's College, Thurles qualifying as a teacher and he teaches business and religion at St. Mary's CBS Enniscorthy.

== Playing career ==
=== St. Patrick's College, Thurles ===
Foley was part of the 2013 Fergal Maher Cup All Ireland Colleges tier 3, winning team.

=== Rapparees Starlights ===
Foley joined the Rapparees Starlights club at a young age and played in all grades at juvenile and underage levels as a dual player. He eventually joined the club's top adult teams in both codes.

On 28 October 2017, Foley lined out at right wing-back when Starlights faced St. Martin's in the Wexford Football Championship final. He scored a point from play and ended the game with a winners' medal following the 0–17 to 1–08 victory.

=== Wexford ===
==== Minor and under-21 ====
Foley first played for Wexford when he was selected for the minor team during the 2011 Leinster Championship. He made his first appearance for the team on 23 April 2011 when he lined out at midfield in Wexford's 3–13 to 3–10 defeat of offaly.

On 8 July 2012, Foley lined out at right wing-forward when Wexford faced Dublin in the Leinster final. He scored a point from play but ended the game on the losing side after a 2–14 to 1–15 defeat.

Foley was once again eligible for the minor grade in 2013 and was appointed joint captain of the team prior to the start of the championship. A broke finger resulted in him missing the entire championship.

Foley was drafted onto the Wexford under-21 team in advance of the 2014 Leinster Championship. He made his debut in the grade on 4 June 2014 when he lined out at left wing-forward in Wexford's 2–14 to 0–10 defeat of Kilkenny. On 9 July 2014, Foley won a Leinster Championship medal after lining out at left corner-forward in Wexford's 1–20 to 0–18 defeat of Dublin in the final. On 13 September 2014, he was again selected at left corner-forward for the All-Ireland final against Clare, but ended on the losing side following a 2–20 to 3–11 defeat.

On 8 July 2015, Foley won a second successive Leinster Championship after scoring three points from centre-forward in Wexford's 4–17 to 1–09 defeat of Kilkenny in the final. He retained his position at centre-forward for the All-Ireland final against Limerick on 12 September 2015, however, he ended on the losing side for the second year in succession following a 0–26 to 1–07 defeat.

Foley was once again included on the Wexford under-21 team for the 2016 Leinster Championship, however, he lost his place on the starting fifteen. He played his last game in the grade on 1 June 2016 when he came on as a substitute in a 2–12 to 1–08 defeat by Dublin.

==== Senior ====
Foley made his first appearance for the Wexford senior team on 15 February 2015 when he lined out at right corner-forward in a 1–24 to 2–20 defeat of Antrim in the National League. He made his Leinster Championship debut on 7 June 2015 when he came on as a 46th-minute substitute for Jack Guiney in a 1–24 to 1–16 defeat of westmeath. Foley withdrew from the Wexford panel at the end of the season.

Foley returned to the Wexford panel after an on-year absence. On 2 July 2017, he was an unused substitute when Wexford suffered a 0–29 to 1–17 defeat by Galway in the Leinster final at Croke Park.

On 20 January 2018, Foley scored a goal from right wing-back in Wexford's 1-24 apiece draw with Kilkenny in the Walsh Cup final. Wexford won the subsequent free-taking shoot-out, with Foley claiming his first silverware at senior level with Wexford.

Wexford reached a second Leinster final in three years on 30 June 2019. Foley was selected at midfield but fulfilled a sweeper role for the entire game. He ended the game with a winners' medal following the 1–23 to 0–23 defeat of Kilkenny.

== Career statistics ==
As of match played 30 June 2019.

| Team | Year | National League | | | Leinster | | All-Ireland | | Total | |
| Team | Year | Division | Apps | Score | Apps | Score | Apps | Score | Apps | Score |
|---|---|---|---|---|---|---|---|---|---|---|
| Wexford | 2015 | Division 1B | 5 | 0-01 | 2 | 0-00 | 1 | 0-01 | 9 | 0-02 |
| Wexford | 2016 | Division 1B | — | | — | | — | | — | |
| Wexford | 2017 | Division 1B | 2 | 0-02 | 1 | 0-00 | 0 | 0-00 | 3 | 0-02 |
| Wexford | 2018 | Division 1A | 7 | 0-14 | 4 | 0-03 | 2 | 0-00 | 13 | 0-17 |
| Wexford | 2019 | Division 1A | 6 | 0-04 | 5 | 0-01 | 0 | 0-00 | 11 | 0-05 |
| Career total | | | 20 | 0-21 | 12 | 0-04 | 3 | 0-01 | 35 | 0-26 |

== Honours ==
Starlights

- Wexford Senior Football Championship (1): 2017
- Wexford Minor Hurling Championship (1): 2011

Wexford

- Leinster Senior Hurling Championship (1): 2019
- Leinster Under-21 Hurling Championship (2): 2014, 2015
