= Jack O'Connor (Wexford hurler) =

Irish hurler (born 1995)

Personal information
- Native name: Seán Ó Conchubhair (Irish)
- Born: 1995 (age 30–31) Piercestown, County Wexford, Ireland
- Occupation: Product manager

Sport
- Sport: Hurling
- Position: Left wing-forward
Club
- Years: Club
- St Martin's
Club titles
- Wexford titles: 2
College
- Years: College
- 2013-2017: University College Dublin
College titles
- Fitzgibbon titles: 0
Inter-county*
Years	County	Apps (scores)
2014-present	Wexford	18 (2-16)
Inter-county titles
- Leinster titles: 1
- All-Irelands: 0
- NHL: 0
- All Stars: 0
- *Inter County team apps and scores correct as of 23:38, 22 July 2019.

Jack O'Connor (born 1995) is an Irish hurler who plays for Wexford Championship club St Martin's and at inter-county level with the Wexford senior hurling team. He usually plays as a right wing-forward, but can also be deployed as a left wing-back.

== Early life ==
Born in Piercestown, County Wexford, O'Connor is the son of John O'Connor and nephew of George O'Connor, both of whom won All-Ireland medals with Wexford in 1996. His brothers, Harry and Rory O'Connor, have also played for Wexford at various levels. His cousin, Joe O’Connor, has also played for Wexford.

== Playing career ==
=== University College Dublin ===
As a student at University College Dublin, O'Connor joined the senior hurling team during his second year. He lined out in several Fitzgibbon Cup campaigns without success.

=== St Martin's ===
O'Connor joined the St Martin's club at a young age and played in all grades at juvenile and underage levels as a dual player. He experienced championship success in the under-21 grade before joining the club's top adult teams as a dual player.

On 22 October 2017, O'Connor lined out at left wing-forward when St Martin's qualified for the Wexford Hurling Championship final. He scored a point from play and ended the game with a winners' medal after the 2–16 to 1–09 defeat of Oulart-the Ballagh. On 29 October 2017, St Martin's had the chance to achieve the double when they faced Starlights in the Wexford Football Championship final. O'Connor lined out at midfield in the 0–17 to 1–08 defeat.

=== Wexford ===
==== Minor and under-21 ====
O'Connor first played for Wexford as a member of the minor team during the 2012 Leinster Championship. On 8 July 2012, he scored a point from left wing-forward when Wexford suffered a 2–14 to 1–15 defeat by Dublin in the Leinster final.

O'Connor was once again eligible for the minor grade in 2013. He made his last appearance for the team on 23 June 2013 when he came on as a substitute in a 1–14 to 0–13 defeat by Laois in the Leinster semi-final.

O'Connor was drafted onto the Wexford under-21 team in advance of the 2014 Leinster Championship. He made his debut in the grade on 4 June 2014 when he lined out at left wing-back in Wexford's 2–14 to 0–10 defeat of Kilkenny. On 9 July 2014, O'Connor won a Leinster Championship medal when he again lined out at left wing-back in Wexford's 1–20 to 0–18 defeat of Dublin in the final. On 13 September 2014, he was again selected at left wing-back for the All-Ireland final against Clare, but ended on the losing side following a 2–20 to 3–11 defeat.

On 8 July 2015, O'Connor won a second successive Leinster Championship after scoring a point from left wing-back in Wexford's 4–17 to 1–09 defeat of Kilkenny in the final. He retained his position at left wing-back for the All-Ireland final against Limerick on 12 September 2015, however, he ended on the losing side for the second year in succession following a 0–26 to 1–07 defeat.

O'Connor was switched to midfield for the 2016 Leinster Championship. He played his last game in the under-21 grade on 1 June 2016 in a 2–12 to 1–08 defeat by Dublin at the quarter-final stage.

==== Senior ====
O'Connor was added to the Wexford senior team at the start of the 2014 season. He remained an unused substitute but a member of the panel during Wexford's National League and Leinster Championship campaigns.

On 13 February 2016, O'Connor made his first appearance for the Wexford senior team when he came on as a 58th-minute substitute for Shane Tompkins at full-forward in Wexford's 2–23 to 0–15 defeat by Limerick in the National League. He made his Leinster Championship debut on 21 May 2016 when he lined out at left wing-back in Wexford's 2–19 to 0–12 defeat by Dublin.

On 2 July 2017, O'Connor was selected at midfield when Wexford qualified for their first Leinster final in nine years. He ended the game on the losing side following the 0–29 to 1–17 defeat by Galway.

On 20 January 2018, O'Connor was named as a substitute when Wexford faced Kilkenny in the Walsh Cup final. He was introduced as a substitute for Cathal Dunbar and scored a point in the 1-24 apiece draw. Wexford won the subsequent free-taking shoot-out, with O'Connor claiming his first silverware at senior level with Wexford.

Wexford reached a second Leinster final in three years on 30 June 2019. O'Connor was selected at right wing-forward and collected a winners' medal after scoring a point in the 1–23 to 0–23 defeat of Kilkenny.

== Honours ==
St Martin's

- Wexford Senior Hurling Championship (1): 2017

Wexford

- Leinster Senior Hurling Championship (1): 2019
- Walsh Cup (1): 2018
- Leinster Under-21 Hurling Championship (2): 2014, 2015
