= Liam Ryan (Wexford hurler) =

Irish hurler

Personal information
- Native name: Liam Ó Riain (Irish)
- Born: 16 August 1995 (age 31) Enniscorthy, County Wexford, Ireland
- Occupation: Postman
- Height: 6 ft 3 in (191 cm)

Sport
- Sport: Hurling
- Position: Full-back
Club
- Years: Club
- Rapparees Starlights
Club titles
	Football	Hurling
Wexford titles	2	1
Inter-county*
Years	County	Apps (scores)
2013–present	Wexford	26 (0-05)
Inter-county titles
- Leinster titles: 1
- All-Irelands: 0
- NHL: 0
- All Stars: 0
- *Inter County team apps and scores correct as of 22:42, 15 July 2019 2017.

Liam Ryan (born 16 August 1995) is an Irish hurler who plays for Wexford Senior Championship club Rapparees and at inter-county level with Wexford senior hurling team. He usually lines out as a full-back.

== Playing career ==
=== Rapparees Starlights ===
Ryan joined the Rapparees Starlights club at a young age and played in all grades at juvenile and underage levels as a dual player. In due course, he joined the club's top adult teams in both codes, eventually coming to prominence after many years in the shadow of his brother Tom.

On 28 October 2017, Ryan lined out at midfield when Starlights faced St. Martin's in the Wexford Football Championship final. He scored a point from play and "dominated" the game for the most part before collecting a winners' medal following the 0–17 to 1–08 victory.

=== Wexford ===
==== Minor and under-21 ====
Ryan first played for Wexford as a member of the minor team during the 2012 Leinster Championship. He made his first appearance for the team on 21 April 2012 in a 2–13 to 3–08 defeat of Offaly. On 8 July 2012, Ryan lined out at right wing-back when Wexford suffered a 2–14 to 1–15 defeat by Dublin in the Leinster final.

Ryan was once again eligible for the minor grade in 2013 but was switched to the full-back position. He made his last appearance for the team on 23 June 2013 in a 1–14 to 0–13 defeat by Laois in the Leinster semi-final.

Ryan was drafted onto the Wexford under-21 team in advance of the 2014 Leinster Championship. He made his debut in the grade on 4 June 2014 when he lined out at full-back in Wexford's 2–14 to 0–10 defeat of Kilkenny. On 9 July 2014, Ryan won a Leinster Championship medal when he again lined out at full-back in Wexford's 1–20 to 0–18 defeat of Dublin in the final. On 13 September 2014, he was again selected at full-back for the All-Ireland final against Clare, but ended on the losing side following a 2–20 to 3–11 defeat. Ryan ended the season by being named in the full-back position on the Team of the Year.

On 8 July 2015, Ryan won a second successive Leinster Championship after lining out at full-back in Wexford's 4–17 to 1–09 defeat of Kilkenny in the final. He retained his position at full-back for the All-Ireland final against Limerick on 12 September 2015, however, he ended on the losing side for the second year in succession following a 0–26 to 1–07 defeat. Ryan was later included at full-back on the Team of the Year.

Ryan was again first-choice full-back for the Wexford under-21 team for the 2016 Leinster Championship. He played his last game in the grade on 1 June 2016 in a 2–12 to 1–08 defeat by Dublin.

==== Senior ====
Ryan made his first appearance for the Wexford senior team on 23 February 2014. After starting the game on the bench he was introduced as a 44th-minute substitute in Wexford's 2–19 to 2–13 defeat of Offaly in the National League. Ryan made his Leinster Championship debut on 1 June 2014 when he was selected at right corner-back for Wexford's 5–19 to 0–21 defeat of Antrim.

On 2 July 2017, Ryan was selected at full-back when Wexford qualified for their first Leinster final in nine years. He ended the game on the losing side following the 0–29 to 1–17 defeat by Galway.

On 20 January 2018, Ryan was selected at full-back when Wexford faced Kilkenny in the Walsh Cup final. He was substituted in favour of Jack Guiney just before the end of the 1-24 apiece draw. Wexford won the subsequent free-taking shoot-out, with Ryan claiming his first silverware at senior level with Wexford. He ended the season by receiving an All-Star nomination.

Wexford reached a second Leinster final in three years on 30 June 2019. Ryan was selected in his usual position at full-back and collected a winners' medal following the 1–23 to 0–23 defeat of Kilkenny.

== Career statistics ==
As of match played 30 June 2019.

Team	Year	National League			Leinster		All-Ireland		Total	
Team	Year	Division	Apps	Score	Apps	Score	Apps	Score	Apps	Score
Wexford	2014	Division 1B	4	0-00	2	0-01	4	0-00	10	0-01
Wexford	2015	Division 1B	5	0-00	2	0-00	1	0-00	8	0-00
Wexford	2016	Division 1B	6	0-00	1	0-00	1	0-01	8	0-01
Wexford	2017	Division 1B	7	1-00	3	0-01	1	0-01	11	1-02
Wexford	2018	Division 1A	7	0-01	4	0-00	2	0-01	13	0-02
Wexford	2019	Division 1A	4	0-01	5	0-00	0	0-00	9	0-01
Career total			33	1-02	17	0-02	9	0-03	58	1-07

== Honours ==
Starlights

- Wexford Senior Football Championship (1): 2017

Wexford

- Leinster Senior Hurling Championship (1): 2019
- Leinster Under-21 Hurling Championship (2): 2014, 2015

Individual

- All-Ireland Under-21 Hurling Team of the Year (2): 2014, 2015
