= Simon Donohoe =

Irish hurler and Gaelic footballer

Personal information
- Native name: Síomón Ó Donnchú (Irish)
- Born: 1995 (age 30–31) Castlebridge, County Wexford, Ireland

Sport
- Sport: Hurling
- Position: Wing back
Club
- Years: Club
- Shelmaliers
Club titles
	Football	Hurling
Wexford titles	1	1
College
- Years: College
- Waterford Institute of Technology
College titles
- Fitzgibbon titles: 0
Inter-county*
Years	County	Apps (scores)
2014-2016 2016-present	Wexford (F); Wexford (H)	5 (1-00); 16 (0-01)
Inter-county titles
- Leinster titles: 1
- All-Irelands: 0
- NHL: 0
- All Stars: 0
- *Inter County team apps and scores correct as of 17:32, 16 July 2019.

Simon Donohoe (born 1995) is an Irish hurler and Gaelic footballer who plays for Wexford Senior Championship club Shelmaliers and at inter-county level with the Wexford senior hurling team. He usually lines out as a wing-back.

== Playing career ==
=== Waterford Institute of Technology ===
Donohoe studied at the Waterford Institute of Technology and joined the senior hurling team in his second year at the institute. He lined out in several Fitzgibbon Cup campaigns with the institute.

=== Shelmaliers ===
==== Minor and under-21 ====
Donohoe joined the Shelmaliers club at a young age and played in all grades at juvenile and underage levels as a dual player. On 16 October 2011, he was at full-back when Shelmaliers faced Fethard St. Mogue's in the Minor Football Division 1 Championship final. Donohoe ended the game with a winners' medal following the victory.

On 7 October 2012, Donohoe played in a second successive Minor Football Championship final. Lining out at centre-back he claimed a second successive winners' medal as Shelmaliers completed a three-in-a-row of championship titles following the 3–07 to 0–07 defeat of Starlights.

Donohoe was still eligible for the minor grade when he was drafted onto the Shelmaliers under-21 team. On 15 December 2013, he won an Under-21 Football Premier Division Championship when he lined out at full-back in a 0–13 to 0–07 defeat of Ballinastragh Gaels in the final.

On 10 December 2014, Donohoe lined out at left corner-forward when Shelamliers faced Fethard St. Mogue's in a replay of the Under-21 Football Championship final. He opened the scoring with a point and ended the game with a second successive winners' medal following the 1–12 to 1–09 victory.

Three-in-a-row proved beyond the Shelmaliers under-21 footballers, however, the club qualified for a third final in four years on 5 December 2016. Donohoe collected a third winners' medal following the 0–08 to 0–04 defeat of Crossabeg-Ballymurn.

==== Senior ====
On 19 October 2014, Donohoe lined out at right corner-back when the Shelmaliers senior hurling team reached the final of the Wexford Hurling Championship for the first time in their history. The game ended in a 0–13 to 1–10 draw with St. Anne's Rathangan. Donohoe retained his position at right corner-forward for the replay a week later. He ended the game with a winners' medal following the 3–08 to 1–11 victory.

On 20 October 2018, Donohoe lined out at right wing-back with the Shelmaliers senior football team that faced Kilanerin in the Wexford Football Championship final. He scored 1-01 from play and ended the game with a winners' medal following the 4–14 to 1–07 victory.

=== Wexford ===
==== Minor and under-21 ====
Donohoe first lined out for Wexford as a member of the minor football team during the 2012 Leinster Championship. He made his debut for the team on 14 April 2012 when he lined out at corner-back in a 3–19 to 0–10 defeat by Kildare.

Donohoe became a dual player in 2013 as we was also added to the Wexford minor hurling team. He made his first appearance as a hurler on 3 May 2013 when he lined out at right corner-back in a 3–07 to 1–10 defeat of Kilkenny in the Leinster Championship.

Donohoe continued his dual status after being drafted onto the Wexford under-21 teams in both codes in 2014. He made his first appearance for the Wexford under-21 football team on 19 February 2014 when he lined out at left corner-back in a 1–16 to 0–06 defeat by Offaly in the Leinster Championship. On 9 July 2014, Donohoe won a Leinster Championship medal as a member of the Wexford under-21 hurling extended panel following a 1–20 to 0–18 defeat of Dublin in the final. On 13 September 2014, he was again a member of the extended panel when Wexford suffered a 2–20 to 3–11 defeat by Clare in the All-Ireland final.

On 8 July 2015, Donohoe won a second successive Leinster Championship - his first on the field of play - following a 4–17 to 1–09 defeat of Kilkenny in the final. He retained his position at left corner-back for the All-Ireland final against Limerick on 12 September 2015. Donohoe ended the game on the losing side following a 0–26 to 1–07 defeat.

McDonald was eligible for the under-21 team for a third and final season in 2016. He played his last game in the grade on 1 June 2016 in a 2–12 to 1–08 defeat by Dublin at the quarter-final stage.

==== Junior and intermediate ====
Donohoe was added to the Wexford junior football team in advance of the 2014 Leinster Championship. He made his only appearance for the team on 29 May 2014 when he lined out at right corner-back in a 1–18 to 1–06 defeat by Cavan.

On 29 June 2016, Donohoe made his first appearance for the Wexford intermediate hurling team. He scored a point from left corner-back in the 1–16 to 0–16 defeat of Galway in the Leinster Championship.

==== Senior ====
Donohoe was straight out of the minor grade when he was added to the Wexford senior football panel at the start of the 2014 season. He was an unused substitute throughout the National League and Leinster Championship campaigns.

On 8 February 2015, Donohoe made his senior debut when he lined out at left wing-back in Wexford's 2–13 to 1–08 defeat by Armagh in the National League. On 14 June 2015, he made his Leinster Championship debut when he lined out at centre-back in Wexford's 1–21 to 0–15 defeat by Westmeath.

Donohoe became a dual player at senior level in 2016. He made his first appearance for the Wexford senior hurling team on 9 July 2016 when he came on as a 63rd-minute substitute in a 0–23 to 1–17 defeat of Cork in the All-Ireland Qualifiers. Donohoe's dual status ended at the end of the 2016 season and he committed solely to the Wexford senior hurling team.

On 2 July 2017, Donohoe was selected at right wing-back when Wexford qualified for their first Leinster final in nine years. He ended the game on the losing side following the 0–29 to 1–17 defeat by Galway.

On 20 January 2018, Donohoe was selected at right corner-back when Wexford faced Kilkenny in the Walsh Cup final, however, the game ended in a 1-24 apiece draw. Wexford won the subsequent free-taking shoot-out, with Donohoe claiming his first silverware at senior level with Wexford.

Wexford reached a second Leinster final in three years on 30 June 2019. Donohoe was selected in his by now usual position of left corner-back and collected a winners' medal following the 1–23 to 0–23 defeat of Kilkenny.

== Career statistics ==
As of match played 30 June 2019.

Team	Year	National Hurling League			Leinster		All-Ireland		Total		National Football League			Leinster		All-Ireland		Total	
Team	Year	Division	Apps	Score	Apps	Score	Apps	Score	Apps	Score	Division	Apps	Score	Apps	Score	Apps	Score	Apps	Score
Wexford	2014	Division 1B	—		—		—		—		Division 3	0	0-00	0	0-00	0	0-00	0	0-00
Wexford	2015	Division 1B	—		—		—		—		Division 3	5	0-00	1	0-00	2	0-00	8	0-00
Wexford	2016	Division 1B	0	0-00	0	0-00	2	0-00	2	0-00	Division 4	5	0-00	1	0-00	1	1-00	7	1-00
Wexford	2017	Division 1B	5	0-01	3	0-00	0	0-00	8	0-01	Division 4	—		—		—		—	
Wexford	2018	Division 1A	4	0-00	4	0-00	2	0-00	10	0-00	Division 3	—		—		—		—	
Wexford	2019	Division 1A	4	0-01	5	0-01	0	0-00	9	0-02	Division 4	—		—		—		—	
Career total			13	0-02	12	0-01	4	0-00	29	0-03		10	0-00	2	0-00	3	1-00	15	1-00

== Honours ==
Shelmaliers

- Wexford Senior Football Championship (2): 2018, 2023
- Wexford Senior Hurling Championship (1): 2014
- Wexford Under-21 Football Championship (3): 2013, 2014, 2016
- Wexford Minor Football Championship (2): 2011, 2012

Wexford

- Leinster Senior Hurling Championship (1): 2019
- Leinster Under-21 Hurling Championship (2): 2014, 2015
