= Joe O'Connor (Wexford hurler) =

Irish hurler

Personal information
- Native name: Seosamh Ó Conchubhair (Irish)
- Born: 1996 (age 29–30) Murrintown, County Wexford, Ireland
- Occupation: Coffee shop proprietor

Sport
- Sport: Hurling
- Position: Centre-back
Club
- Years: Club
- St Martin's
Club titles
- Wexford titles: 2
College
- Years: College
- DCU Dóchas Éireann
College titles
- Fitzgibbon titles: 0
Inter-county
- Years: County
- 2016-present: Wexford
Inter-county titles
- Leinster titles: 1
- All-Irelands: 0
- NHL: 0
- All Stars: 0

Joseph O'Connor (born 1997) is an Irish hurler who plays for Wexford Championship club St. Martins GAA and at inter-county level with the Wexford senior hurling team. He usually lines out as a full-back or centre-back.

== Career ==
O'Connor is a member of the O'Connor hurling dynasty that includes 1996 All-Ireland Championship-winners George and John O'Connor and current players Rory and Jack O'Connor. He first came to hurling prominence at juvenile and underage levels with the St Martin's club and was a member of their County Championship-winning teams in 2017 and 2019. O'Connor first played at inter-county level during a two-year stint with the Wexford minor team before later lining out with the under-21 team. He was just out of the minor grade when he was drafted onto the Wexford senior hurling team in 2016 and was a panel member during the 2019 Leinster Championship win.

O'Connor trained as a teacher while in DCU but switched careers to open a coffee shop in Wexford town.

== Honours ==
St. Martins

- Wexford Senior Hurling Championship: 2017, 2019

Wexford

- Leinster Senior Hurling Championship: 2019
