= Paudie Foley =

Irish hurler

Personal information
- Native name: Pádraig Ó Foghlú (Irish)
- Born: 1995 (age 30–31) Crossabeg, County Wexford, Ireland
- Occupation: Secondary school teacher
- Height: 6 ft 4 in (193 cm)

Sport
- Sport: Hurling
- Position: Right wing-back
Club
- Years: Club
- Crossabeg-Ballymurn
Club titles
- Wexford titles: 0
College
- Years: College
- DCU Dóchas Éireann
College titles
- Fitzgibbon titles: 0
Inter-county*
| Years | County | Apps (scores) |
| 2015-present | Wexford | 16 (0-12) |
Inter-county titles
- Leinster titles: 1
- All-Irelands: 0
- NHL: 0
- All Stars: 0
- *Inter County team apps and scores correct as of 12:20, 23 July 2019.

Pádraig Foley (born 1995) is an Irish hurler who plays for Wexford Senior Championship club Crossabeg-Ballymurn and at inter-county level with the Wexford senior hurling team. He usually lines out as a right wing-back.

== Playing career ==
=== DCU Dóchas Éireann ===
As a student at Dublin City University, Foley joined the senior hurling team during his second year. On 24 February 2018, he lined out at left wing-back when DCU Dóchas Éireann faced the University of Limerick in the Fitzgibbon Cup final, however, he ended the game on the losing side following a 2–21 to 2–15 defeat.

=== Crossabeg-Ballymurn ===
Foley joined the Crossabeg-Ballymurn at a young age and played in all grades at juvenile and underage levels before joining the club's top adult teams as a dual player.

=== Wexford ===
==== Minor and under-21 ====
Foley first lined out for Wexford as a member of the minor team during the 2012 Leinster Championship. On 8 July 2012, he was an unused substitute when Wexford suffered a 2–15 to 1–14 defeat by Dublin in the Leinster final.

On 4 May 2013, Foley made his first appearance for the starting fifteen when he lined out at right wing-back in Wexford's 3–07 to 1–10 defeat of Kilkenny. Wexford's championship ended with a subsequent defeat by Laois at the semi-final stage.

Foley was drafted onto the Wexford under-21 team for the 2014 Leinster Championship. He made his debut in the grade on 9 July 2014 when he lined out at left wing-forward when Wexford faced Dublin in the Leinster final. Foley scored a point from play and claimed a winners' medal following the 1–20 to 0–18 victory. On 13 September 2014, he was again selected at left wing-forward for the All-Ireland final against Clare. Foley was held scoreless and ended the game on the losing side following a 2–20 to 3–11 victory for Clare.

On 8 July 2015, Foley won a second successive Leinster Championship when he lined out at centre-back in the 4–17 to 1–09 defeat of Kilkenny in the final. He retained his position at centre-back for the All-Ireland final against Limerick on 12 September 2015 but ended the game on the losing side for a second successive year after a 0–26 to 1–07 defeat.

Foley was eligible for the under-21 team for a third and final season in 2016. He played his last game in the grade on 1 June when he scored a point from centre-back in a 2–12 to 1–08 defeat by Dublin at the quarter-final stage.

==== Senior ====
Foley was added to the Wexford senior team in advance of the 2015 National League. He made his first appearance for the team on 15 February 2015 when he lined out at right wing-back in a 1–24 to 2–20 defeat of Antrim.

Foley left the Wexford team during the 2017 season and spent time travelling in the United States. Foley returned to the Wexford panel in October 2017.

On 20 January 2018, Foley was selected on the bench when Wexford faced Kilkenny in the Walsh Cup final. He was introduced as a substitute at right wing-forward in the 1-24 apiece draw with Kilkenny. Wexford won the subsequent free-taking shoot-out, with Foley claiming his first silverware at senior level with Wexford.

On 30 June 2019, Foley was selected at right wing-back but spent much of the game at centre-back when Wexford faced Kilkenny in the Leinster final. He ended the game with a winners' medal following the 1–23 to 0–23 victory.

He withdrew from the Wexford hurling panel ahead of the 2021 season.

== Career statistics ==
As of match played 30 June 2019.

| Team | Year | National League | | | Leinster | | All-Ireland | | Total | |
| Team | Year | Division | Apps | Score | Apps | Score | Apps | Score | Apps | Score |
|---|---|---|---|---|---|---|---|---|---|---|
| Wexford | 2015 | Division 1B | 5 | 0-01 | 0 | 0-00 | 1 | 0-00 | 6 | 0-01 |
| Wexford | 2016 | Division 1B | 6 | 0-00 | 1 | 0-00 | 3 | 0-00 | 10 | 0-00 |
| Wexford | 2017 | Division 1B | — | | — | | — | | — | |
| Wexford | 2018 | Division 1A | 7 | 0-14 | 4 | 0-08 | 2 | 0-00 | 13 | 0-22 |
| Wexford | 2019 | Division 1A | 6 | 0-05 | 5 | 0-04 | 0 | 0-00 | 11 | 0-09 |
| Total | | | 24 | 0-20 | 10 | 0-12 | 6 | 0-00 | 40 | 0-32 |

== Honours ==
Crossabeg-Ballymurn

- Wexford Intermediate A Football Championship (1): 2017
- Wexford Intermediate A Hurling Championship (1): 2014

Wexford

- Leinster Senior Hurling Championship (1): 2019
- Walsh Cup (1): 2018
- Leinster Under-21 Hurling Championship (2): 2014, 2015
