= Conor Firman =

Irish hurler (born 1998)

Personal information
- Native name: Conchur Mac an Fhir (Irish)
- Born: 1998 (age 27–28) Piercestown, County Wexford, Ireland
- Occupation: Student

Sport
- Sport: Hurling
- Position: Centre-back
Club
- Years: Club
- St Martin's
Club titles
- Wexford titles: 2
College
- Years: College
- 2017-present: DCU Dóchas Éireann
College titles
- Fitzgibbon titles: 0
Inter-county*
Years	County	Apps (scores)
2018-present	Wexford	5 (0-00)
Inter-county titles
- Leinster titles: 1
- All-Irelands: 0
- NHL: 0
- *Inter County team apps and scores correct as of 17:32, 5 July 2019.

Conor Firman (born 1998) is an Irish hurler who plays for Wexford Senior Championship club St Martin's and at inter-county level with the Wexford senior hurling team. He usually lines out as a centre-back.

== Playing career ==
=== St Peter's College ===
Firman first came to prominence as a hurler and Gaelic footballer with St Peter's College in Wexford. He played in every grade of hurling and Gaelic football before eventually joining the college's senior teams.

On 27 January 2017, O'Connor scored two points from centre-back when he captained St Peter's College to the Leinster Championship title following their 2–13 to 0–07 victory. He retained his position at centre-back when St Peter's College faced St Brendan's College from Killarney in the All-Ireland final on 1 April 2017. Firman ended the game on the losing side following the 0–18 to 0–10 defeat.

=== DCU Dóchas Éireann ===
As a student at Dublin City University, Firman immediately became involved in hurling and joined the college's freshers' hurling team in his first year. On 21 March 2018, he was at centre-back when Dublin City University defeated the University of Limerick by 1–20 to 2–15 to win the All-Ireland Freshers' Championship title.

=== St Martin's ===
Firman joined the St Martin's club at a young age and played in all grades at juvenile and underage levels as a dual player. He experienced much success in the minor, under-20 and under-21 grades and won several championship medals across both codes between 2014 and 2018.

Firman lined out at left corner-back in his first Wexford Senior Championship final on 22 October 2017. He ended the game with a winners' medal following the 2–16 to 1–09 defeat of Oulart-the Ballagh. On 29 October 2017, St Martin's had the chance to achieve the double when they faced Starlights in the Wexford Football Championship final. Firman lined out at right wing-back in the 0–17 to 1–08 defeat.

=== Wexford ===
==== Minor and under-21 ====
Firman first lined out for Wexford as a member of the minor team during the 2014 Leinster Championship. He made his first appearance for the team on 13 April 2014 when he lined out at left corner-back in a 0–16 to 0–11 defeat by Dublin.

Firman was in his third and final year of playing in the minor grade when he lined out in the Leinster final on 3 July 2016. He lined out at centre-back in the 2–12 to 0–12 defeat by Dublin.

Firman was drafted onto the Wexford under-21 team in advance of the 2017 Leinster Championship. He made his first appearance in that grade on 31 May 2017 when he lined out at right corner-back in Wexford's 4–21 to 2–09 defeat of Offaly. On 5 July 2017, Firman again lined out at right corner-back when Wexford suffered a 0–30 to 1–15 defeat by Kilkenny in the Leinster final.

Firman was eligible for the under-21 grade for a second and final season in 2018. He lined out at midfield in a second successive Leinster final on 4 July, however, he ended on the losing side following the 4–21 to 2-26 extra-time defeat by Galway.

==== Senior ====
Firman was added to the Wexford senior team prior to the start of the 2017 National League but was an unused substitute throughout the campaign. On 2 July 2017, he was an unused substitute when Wexford suffered a 0–29 to 1–17 defeat by Galway in the Leinster final.

On 18 February 2018, Firman made his first appearance for the Wexford senior team when he lined out at left corner-back in a 3–21 to 1–21 defeat by Tipprary in the National League.

Wexford reached a second Leinster final in three years on 30 June 2019. Firman started the game on the bench but was introduced as a 14th-minute blood substitute for Shaun Murphy before later coming on as a full substitute for Damien Reck. He ended the game with a winners' medal following the 1–23 to 0–23 defeat of Kilkenny.

== Career statistics ==
As of match played 30 June 2019.

Team	Year	National League			Leinster		All-Ireland		Total	
Team	Year	Division	Apps	Score	Apps	Score	Apps	Score	Apps	Score
Wexford	2017	Division 1A	0	0-00	0	0-00	0	0-00	0	0-00
Wexford	2018	Division 1A	3	0-00	3	0-00	1	0-00	7	0-00
Wexford	2019	Division 1A	1	0-00	1	0-00	0	0-00	2	0-00
Career total			4	0-00	4	0-00	1	0-00	9	0-00

== Honours ==
DCU Dóchas Éireann

- All-Ireland Freshers' Hurling Championship (1): 2018

Naomh Éanna

- Wexford Senior Hurling Championship (1): 2018

Wexford

- Leinster Senior Hurling Championship (1): 2019
