= Shane Reck =

Irish hurler (born 1997)

Personal information
- Native name: Seán Ó Raigill (Irish)
- Born: 1997 (age 28–29) Enniscorthy, County Wexford, Ireland
- Occupation: Student

Sport
- Sport: Hurling
- Position: Right corner-back
Club
- Years: Club
- Oylegate-Glenbrien
Club titles
- Wexford titles: 0
College
- Years: College
- 2016-present: Institute of Technology, Carlow
College titles
- Fitzgibbon titles: 0
Inter-county*
Years	County	Apps (scores)
2019-	Wexford	3 (0-00)
Inter-county titles
- Leinster titles: 1
- All-Irelands: 0
- NHL: 0
- All Stars: 0
- *Inter County team apps and scores correct as of 17:32, 16 July 2019.

Shane Reck (born 1997) is an Irish hurler who plays for Wexford Senior Championship club Oylegate-Glenbrien and at inter-county level with the Wexford senior hurling team. He usually lines out as a right corner-back.

== Playing career ==
=== Institute of Technology, Carlow ===
As a student at the Institute of Technology, Carlow, Reck joined the senior hurling team during his second year. He has since lined out for the institute in several Fitzgibbon Cup campaigns.

=== Oylegate-Glenbrien ===
Reck joined the Oylegate-Glenbrien club at a young age and played in all grades at juvenile and underage levels before eventually joining the club's top adult team in the Wexford Intermediate Championship.

On 15 October 2016, Reck lined out at right wing-back when Oylegate-Glenbrien faced Adamstown in the Wexford Intermediate Championship final. He ended the game with a winners' medal following the 1–14 to 0–10 victory which secured promotion to the top flight of Wexford hurling.

=== Wexford ===
==== Under-21 ====
Reck first played for Wexford when he was drafted onto the under-21 team in advance of the 2017 Leinster Championship. He made his first appearance for the team on 21 June 2017 when he lined out at left corner-back in a 3–16 to 1–12 defeat of Carlow. On 5 July 2017, Reck was again named at left corner-back when Wexford suffered a 0–30 to 1–15 defeat by Kilkenny in the Leinster final.

==== Senior ====
Reck joined the Wexford senior team in advance of the 2019 National League. He made his first appearance for the team on 27 January 2019 when he came on as a 21st-minute for Conor Firman at left corner-back in a 1–17 to 2–11 defeat by Limerick. Reck made his Leinster Championship debut on 19 May 2019 when he was again introduced as a substitute for Shaun Murphy in a 2–19 to 1–22 draw with Dublin. On 30 June 2019, he won a Leinster Championship medal when he lined out at left wing-back when Wexford defeated Kilkenny by 1–23 to 0–23 in the final.

== Career statistics ==
As of match played 30 June 2019.

Team	Year	National League			Leinster		All-Ireland		Total	
Team	Year	Division	Apps	Score	Apps	Score	Apps	Score	Apps	Score
Wexford	2019	Division 1A	4	0-00	3	0-00	0	0-00	7	0-00
Career total			4	0-00	3	0-00	0	0-00	7	0-00

== Honours ==
Oylegate-Glenbrien

- Wexford Intermediate Hurling Championship (1): 2016

Wexford

- Leinster Senior Hurling Championship (1): 2019
