= Conor McDonald =

Irish hurler

Personal information
- Native name: Conchúr Mac Domhnall (Irish)
- Born: 22 September 1995 (age 31) Gorey, County Wexford, Ireland
- Occupation: Personal trainer
- Height: 1.88 m (6 ft 2 in)

Sport
- Sport: Hurling
- Position: Full-forward
Club
- Years: Club
- 2012–present: Naomh Éanna
Club titles
- Wexford titles: 2
College
- Years: College
- University College Dublin
College titles
- Fitzgibbon titles: 0
Inter-county*
Years	County	Apps (scores)
2013–present	Wexford	57 (22-135)
Inter-county titles
- Leinster titles: 1
- All-Irelands: 0
- NHL: 0
- All Stars: 0
- *Inter County team apps and scores correct as of match played 25 May 2025.

Conor McDonald (born 22 September 1995) is an Irish hurler who plays for Wexford Senior Championship club Naomh Éanna and at inter-county level with the Wexford senior hurling team. He usually lines out as a full-forward.

== Playing career ==
=== Gorey Community School ===
McDonald first came to prominence as a hurler with Gorey Community School and Naomh Eanna GAA Club. He played in every grade of hurling before eventually joining the college's senior hurling team and lined out in several Leinster Championship campaigns.

=== University College Dublin ===
As a student at University College Dublin, McDonald joined the senior hurling team during his second year. He lined out for the college in the Fitzgibbon Cup and Walsh Cup.

=== Naomh Éanna ===
McDonald joined the Naomh Éanna club at a young age and played in all grades at juvenile and underage levels. He enjoyed championship success in the under-12 grade, however, he subsequently went on to lose finals at under-14, under-16, minor and under-21 level.

McDonald joined the club's top adult team as a 16-year-old during the 2012 Intermediate A Championship. On 6 October 2012, he was at full-forward when Naomh Éanna faced Marshalstown-Castledockrell in the championship final. McDonald collected a winners' medal after scoring a first-half goal in the 1–15 to 1–11 victory.

On 17 October 2015, McDonald lined out at full-forward when Naomh Éanna faced Crossabeg-Ballymurn in the final of the Wexford Intermediate Championship. He scored 1–05 in the 1–15 to 2–11 victory.

On 21 October 2018, McDonald lined out at full-forward when Naomh Éanna reached the final of the Wexford Senior Championship. He scored 2-01 from play and ended the game with a winners' medal following the 2–11 to 0–13 defeat of St. Martin's.

=== Wexford ===
==== Minor and under-21 ====
McDonald first lined out for Wexford as a member of the minor team during the 2011 Leinster Championship. He made his first appearance for the team as a 15-year-old on 23 April when he was introduced as an 11th-minute substitute and scored 1–01 in a 3–13 to 3–10 defeat of Offaly.

McDonald was eligible for the minor grade again during the 2012 Leinster Championship. He lined out at full-forward in his first Leinster final on 8 July 2012. McDonald scored 0–05 in the 2–15 to 1–14 defeat by Dublin.

For the third year in succession, McDonald was included on the Wexford minor team in 2013. He made his last appearance in the grade on 23 June when he top scored for the team with 0–05 in a 1–14 to 0–13 defeat by Laois.

McDonald was in his final year with the Wexford minor team when he was drafted onto the under-21 team. He made his first appearance for the team on 11 July 2013 when he lined out at right corner-forward in the Leinster final. McDonald scored two points from play and collected a Leinster Championship medal following the 1–21 to 0–21 defeat of Kilkenny.

On 9 July 2014, McDonald won a second successive Leinster Championship medal after scoring 1-03 from full-forward in a 1–20 to 0–18 defeat of Dublin in the final. On 13 September 2014, he was again selected at full-forward for the All-Ireland final against Clare. McDonald scored a second-half goal but ended on the losing side following a 2–20 to 3–11 victory for Clare. He ended the season by being named in the full-forward position on the Team of the Year.

On 8 July 2015, McDonald won a third successive Leinster Championship after top scoring with 1–10 in the 4–17 to 1–09 defeat of Kilkenny in the final. He retained his position at full-forward for the All-Ireland final against Limerick on 12 September 2015. McDonald top scored for Wexford with 1-04, however, he ended on the losing side following a 0–26 to 1–07 defeat. He ended the season as the championship's top scorer with 3-38 while he was also included on the Team of the Year.

McDonald was eligible for the under-21 team for a fourth and final season in 2016. He played his last game in the grade on 1 June when he scored 1–05 in a 2–12 to 1–08 defeat by Dublin at the quarter-final stage.

==== Senior ====
McDonald was just 17-years-old and a member of the minor team when he was drafted onto the Wexford senior team during the All-Ireland Qualifiers. He made his first appearance for the team on 13 July 2013 when he scored a point after coming on as a 67th-minute substitute in a 3–24 to 1–20 defeat by Clare.

On 2 July 2017, McDonald was selected at left wing-forward when Wexford qualified for their first Leinster final in nine years. He scored six points, including three frees, in the 0–29 to 1–17 defeat by Galway. McDonald ended the season by receiving an All-Star nomination.

On 20 January 2018, McDonald was named amongst the substitutes when Wexford faced Kilkenny in the Walsh Cup final. He was introduced as a 62nd-minute substitute for Harry Kehoe and scored two points in the 1-24 apiece draw. Wexford won the subsequent free-taking shoot-out, with McDonald claiming his first silverware at senior level with Wexford after scoring a point in the shoot-out.

Wexford reached a second Leinster final in three years on 30 June 2019. McDonald was selected at left wing-forward but spent much of the game as part of a two-man full-forward line. He scored four points from play and collected a winners' medal following the 1–23 to 0–23 defeat of Kilkenny.

== Career statistics ==
As of match played 25 May 2025

Team	Year	National League			Leinster		All-Ireland		Total	
Team	Year	Division	Apps	Score	Apps	Score	Apps	Score	Apps	Score
Wexford	2013	Division 1B	0	0-00	0	0-00	1	0-01	1	0-01
Wexford	2014	Division 1B	4	0-00	2	2-04	4	3-06	10	5-10
Wexford	2015	Division 1B	4	2-06	2	0-03	1	0-01	7	2-10
Wexford	2016	Division 1B	5	4-18	1	0-06	3	0-29	9	4-53
Wexford	2017	Division 1B	7	3-46	3	0-20	1	0-01	11	3-67
Wexford	2018	Division 1A	7	2-07	4	1-03	2	2-04	13	5-14
Wexford	2019	Division 1A	6	2-05	5	1-14	1	2-01	12	5-20
Wexford	2020	Division 1B	5	2-07	1	0-00	1	0-01	7	2-08
Wexford	2021	Division 1B	4	1-04	2	2-06	1	0-02	7	3-12
Wexford	2022	Division 1A	5	0-08	5	2-08	2	1-03	12	3-19
Wexford	2023	Division 1A	4	2-07	5	3-05	-		9	5-12
Wexford	2024	Division 1A	0	0-00	5	3-09	2	0-06	7	3-15
Wexford	2025	Division 1A	0	0-00	3	0-02	-		3	0-02
Total			51	18-108	38	14-80	19	8-55	108	39-243

== Honours ==
Naomh Éanna

- Wexford Senior Hurling Championship (1): 2018
- Wexford Intermediate Hurling Championship (1): 2015
- Wexford Intermediate A Hurling Championship (1): 2012

Wexford

- Leinster Senior Hurling Championship (1): 2019
- Walsh Cup (1): 2018
- Leinster Under-21 Hurling Championship (3): 2013, 2014, 2015
