= Mark Fanning =

Irish hurler (born 1991)

Personal information
- Native name: Marc Ó Fainín (Irish)
- Born: 16 May 1991 (age 35) Killurin, County Wexford, Ireland
- Occupation: Insurance broker

Sport
- Sport: Hurling
- Position: Goalkeeper
Club
- Years: Club
- Glynn-Barntown
Club titles
- Wexford titles: 0
College
- Years: College
- 2015-2018: Waterford Institute of Technology
College titles
- Fitzgibbon titles: 0
Inter-county*
Years	County	Apps (scores)
2010-present	Wexford	31 (2-01)
Inter-county titles
- Leinster titles: 1
- All-Irelands: 0
- NHL: 0
- All Stars: 0
- *Inter County team apps and scores correct as of 21:18, 2 July 2019.

Mark Fanning (born 16 May 1991) is an Irish hurler who plays for Wexford Senior Championship club Glynn-Barntown and at inter-county level with the Wexford senior hurling team. He usually lines out as a goalkeeper.

== Playing career ==
=== Waterford Institute of Technology ===
As a student at the Waterford Institute of Technology, Fanning was a key member of the college's senior team. He lined out in several Fitzgibbon Cup campaigns without success.

=== Glynn-Barntown ===
Fanning joined the Glynn-Barntown club at a young age and played in all grades at juvenile and underage levels. He enjoyed championship success as a dual player in the under-21 grades before eventually joining the club's top adult teams.

On 3 October 2009, Fanning won a Wexford Intermediate Football Championship title following Glynn-Barntown's 2–07 to 1–05 defeat of St Mary's Rosslare in the final.

=== Wexford ===
==== Minor and under-21 ====
Fanning first played for Wexford as a member of the minor team during the 2008 Leinster Championship. He made his first appearance for the team on 6 April 2008 when he lined out in goal in Wexford's 3–12 to 0–15 defeat by Kilkenny. On 6 July 2008, Fanning was again in goal when Wexford suffered a 1–19 to 0–12 defeat by Kilkenny in the Leinster final.

Fanning was once again eligible for the minor grade in 2009. He lined out in goal in a second successive Leinster final on 5 July 2009, however, Wexford suffered a 1–19 to 0–11 defeat by Kilkenny.

On 23 June 2010, Fanning made his first appearance for the Wexford under-21 team when he lined out in goal in a 2–17 to 2–13 defeat of Carlow. He was again in goal for the Leinster final on 14 July 2010, which Wexford lost to Dublin by 2–15 to 0–15.

Fanning lined out in goal in a second successive Leinster final on 13 July 2011. He ended on the losing side following the 1–18 to 0–11 defeat by Dublin for the second year in-a-row.

Fanning was eligible for the Wexford under-21 team for a third and final season in 2012. He made his final appearance in the grade on 20 June 2012 when Wexford suffered a 3–20 to 4–06 defeat by Kilkenny at the semi-final stage.

==== Senior ====
Fanning made his first appearance for the Wexford senior team on 10 March 2013. He lined out in goal in a 0–16 to 0–14 defeat by Offaly in the National League. On 8 June 2013, Fanning made his Leinster Championship debut in a 1-1-17 apiece draw with Dublin.

On 2 July 2017, Fanning lined out in goal in his first Leinster final against Galway. He maintained a clean sheet but ended the game on the losing side following a 0–29 to 1–17 defeat.

On 20 January 2018, Fanning lined out in goal for Wexford's 1-24 apiece draw with Kilkenny in the Walsh Cup final. Wexford won the subsequent free-taking shoot-out, with Fanning scoring the winning point and claiming his first silverware at senior level with Wexford.

Wexford reached a second Leinster final in three years on 30 June 2019. Fanning lined out in his usual position in goal and scored a late penalty to secure a 1–23 to 0–23 defeat of Kilkenny.

== Career statistics ==
As of match played 30 June 2019.

Team	Year	National League			Leinster		All-Ireland		Total	
Team	Year	Division	Apps	Score	Apps	Score	Apps	Score	Apps	Score
Wexford	2010	Division 2	0	0-00	0	0-00	0	0-00	0	0-00
Wexford	2011	Division 1	0	0-00	0	0-00	0	0-00	0	0-00
Wexford	2012	Division 1B	0	0-00	0	0-00	0	0-00	0	0-00
Wexford	2013	Division 1B	3	0-00	2	0-00	3	0-00	8	0-00
Wexford	2014	Division 1B	6	0-00	2	0-00	4	0-00	12	0-00
Wexford	2015	Division 1B	5	0-00	2	0-00	1	0-00	8	0-00
Wexford	2016	Division 1B	2	1-00	0	0-00	3	0-01	5	1-01
Wexford	2017	Division 1B	7	2-02	2	0-00	1	0-00	10	2-02
Wexford	2018	Division 1A	6	0-07	4	1-00	2	0-00	12	1-07
Wexford	2019	Division 1A	5	0-00	5	1-00	0	0-00	10	1-00
Career total			34	3-09	17	2-00	14	0-01	65	5-10

== Honours ==
Glynn-Barntown

- Wexford Intermediate Football Championship (1): 2009
- Wexford Premier Minor Hurling Championship (2009)
- Wexford U21 Roinn 1 Hurling Championship (2009)
- Wexford U21 Premier Hurling Championship (2010)
- Wexford Premier Minor Football Championship (2009)
- Wexford Premier U21 Football Championship (2011,2012)

Wexford

- Leinster Senior Hurling Championship (1): 2019
- Walsh Cup (1): 2019
