= Paul Morris (hurler) =

Wexford hurler (born 1990)

Personal information
- Native name: Pól Ó Muiris (Irish)
- Born: 23 February 1990 (age 36) Ferns, County Wexford, Ireland
- Occupation: Commercial development manager

Sport
- Sport: Hurling
- Position: Right corner-forward
Club
- Years: Club
- 2007–present: Ferns St Aidan's
Club titles
- Wexford titles: 0
College
- Years: College
- 2008–2012: Dublin Institute of Technology
College titles
- Fitzgibbon titles: 0
Inter-county*
Years	County	Apps (scores)
2010–2022	Wexford	36 (4–75)
Inter-county titles
- Leinster titles: 1
- All-Irelands: 0
- NHL: 0
- All Stars: 0
- *Inter County team apps and scores correct as of 15:05, 15 July 2019.

Paul Morris (born 23 February 1990) is an Irish hurler who plays for Wexford Senior Championship club Ferns St Aidan's and, formerly, at senior level for the Wexford county team. He usually lines out as a left corner-forward.

== Playing career ==
=== FCJ Bunclody ===
Morris first came to prominence as a hurler with FCJ Bunclody in Bunclody. He played in every grade of hurling before eventually joining the college's senior hurling team. On 22 April 2007, Morris was at midfield when FCJ Bunclody faced Cross & Passion College from Ballycastle in the All-Ireland Colleges B Championship final. He top scored with 0-08 and ended the game with a winners' medal following the 1–11 to 0–08 victory.

=== Dublin Institute of Technology ===
As a student at the Dublin Institute of Technology, Morris immediately became involved in hurling. He lined out with the senior hurling team in several Fitzgibbon Cup campaigns.

=== Ferns St Aidan's ===
Morris joined the Ferns St Aidan's club at a young age and played in all grades at juvenile and underage levels. He joined the club's top adult team when he was still eligible for the minor grade.

On 4 November 2007, Morris lined out for Ferns St Aidan's when they faced Rathnure in the Wexford Intermediate Championship final. He ended the game with a winners' medal following the victory. On 18 November 2007, Morris lined out when Ferns St Aidan's suffered a 1–15 to 3–07 defeat by Clonkill in the Leinster final.

On 20 October 2013, Morris lined out at centre-forward when Ferns St Aidan's faced Oulart-the Ballagh in the Wexford Senior Championship final. He scored three points from play in the 3–12 to 1–16 defeat.

=== Wexford ===
==== Minor and under-21 ====
Morris first played for Wexford as a member of the minor team during the 2007 Leinster Championship. He made his first appearance for the team on 24 April 2007 when he lined out at midfield in a 1–12 to 2–04 defeat of Carlow.

On 6 July 2008, Morris lined out at centre-forward when Wexford faced Kilkenny in the Leinster final. He top scored with 0–06 in the 1–19 to 0–13 defeat.

Morris was drafted onto the Wexford under-21 team for the 2009 Leinster Championship. He made his first appearance for the team on 10 June 2009 when he came on as a substitute in Wexford's 1–24 to 0–08 defeat by Dublin.

On 14 July 2010, Morris was selected on the bench when Wexford faced Dublin in the Leinster final. He came on as a substitute in the 2–15 to 0–15 defeat.

Morris lined out in a second successive Leinster final with the Wexford under-21 team on 13 July 2011. He scored four points overall, including two from frees, in the 1–18 to 0–11 defeat by Dublin.

==== Senior ====
Morris was added to the Wexford senior team in advance of the 2010 National League. He made his first appearance for the team on 21 March 2010 when he came on as a late substitute for Harry Kehoe in a 0–16 to 0–13 defeat by Carlow. On 2 May 2010, Morris was an unused substitute when Wexford defeated Clare by 1–16 to 2–09 to win the National League Division 2 title. Morris made his Leinster Championship debut on 29 May 2010 when he came on as a 66th-minute substitute for Michael Jacob in a 2–22 to 1–14 defeat by Galway.

On 2 July 2017, Morris lined out in his first Leinster final. He was selected at right corner-forward but spent much of the game against Galway at right wing-forward. Morris scored two points from play in the 0–29 to 1–17 defeat.

On 20 January 2018, Morris lined out at full-forward when Wexford faced Kilkenny in the Walsh Cup final. He top scored with 0-09, including seven frees, in the 1-24 apiece draw. Wexford won the subsequent free-taking shoot-out, with Morris missing his attempt from a placed ball.

Wexford reached a second Leinster final in three years on 30 June 2019. Morris lined out at left corner-forward as part of a two-man full-forward line and collected a winners' medal after scoring a point from play in the 1–23 to 0–23 defeat of Kilkenny.

He announced his retirement from inter-county hurling at the end of 2022.

=== Leinster ===
Morris was added to the Leinster inter-provincial team in advance of the 2012 Interprovincial Championship. He made his only appearance for the team on 17 February 2012 when he came on as a 69th-minute substitute for Danny Sutcliffe in a 3–13 to 1–16 defeat by Connacht at the semi-final stage.

== Career statistics ==
As of match played 30 June 2019.

Team	Year	National League			Leinster		All-Ireland		Total	
Team	Year	Division	Apps	Score	Apps	Score	Apps	Score	Apps	Score
Wexford	2010	Division 2	2	0-00	1	0-00	0	0-00	3	0-00
Wexford	2011	Division 1	0	0-00	0	0-00	0	0-00	0	0-00
Wexford	2012	Division 1B	5	3-05	1	0-03	3	0-00	9	3-08
Wexford	2013	Division 1B	5	1-27	2	0-02	3	1-04	10	2-33
Wexford	2014	Division 1B	6	1-23	2	0-12	4	1-24	12	2-59
Wexford	2015	Division 1B	3	0-04	2	0-05	1	0-01	6	0-10
Wexford	2016	Division 1B	3	0-03	1	0-00	3	1-01	7	1-04
Wexford	2017	Division 1B	7	0-13	3	0-10	1	0-01	11	0-24
Wexford	2018	Division 1A	6	0-08	4	1-06	1	0-01	11	1-15
Wexford	2019	Division 1A	5	0-08	4	0-05	0	0-00	9	0-13
Career total			42	5-91	20	1-43	16	3-32	78	9-166

== Honours ==
FCJ Bunclody

- All-Ireland Colleges Senior B Hurling Championship (1): 2007

Ferns St Aidan's

- Wexford Intermediate Hurling Championship (1): 2007

Wexford

- Leinster Senior Hurling Championship (1): 2019
- National Hurling League Division 2 (1): 2010
