= Aidan Nolan =

Irish hurler (born 1992/93)

Personal information
- Native name: Aodán Ó Núalláin (Irish)
- Born: 1993 (age 32–33) Bunclody, County Wexford, Ireland

Sport
- Sport: Hurling
- Position: Midfield/Half-Forward
Club
- Years: Club
- HWH–Bunclody
Club titles
- Wexford titles: 0
Inter-county
- Years: County
- 2015–2021: Wexford
Inter-county titles
- Leinster titles: 1
- All-Irelands: 0
- NHL: 0
- All Stars: 0

Aidan Nolan (born 1992 or 1993) is an Irish hurler who has played as a midfielder or half-forward for the Wexford senior hurling team. At club level, he plays both hurling and Gaelic football with Half Way House Bunclody.

Nolan was a member of the Wexford Under-21 squad that were runners-up in the 2014 All-Ireland Under-21 Hurling Championship. He made his senior inter-county debut in the 2015 National Hurling League. A member of the senior panel for several years, he participated in Wexford's 2019 Leinster Senior Hurling Championship campaign, but missed the final after being shown a red card (for "abusive language towards a referee") in a group stage game. After a successful appeal, he returned to the team and was used as a substitute in the 2019 All-Ireland Senior Hurling Championship semi-final game against Tipperary. He was also involved in Wexford's 2020 Leinster Senior Hurling Championship campaign, and in the 2020 Walsh Cup campaign. Nolan scored 1 point in Wexford's 1–16 to 0–18 win over Galway in the 2020 Walsh Cup final.

== Honours ==
Wexford

- Leinster Senior Hurling Championship (1): 2019
- Leinster Under-21 Hurling Championship (3): 2013, 2014
