= Rory O'Connor (hurler) =

Irish hurler (born 1998)

Personal information
- Native name: Ruairí Ó Conchúir (Irish)
- Born: 22 July 1998 (age 28) Piercestown, County Wexford, Ireland
- Occupation: Student

Sport
- Sport: Hurling
- Position: Left corner-forward
Club
- Years: Club
- St Martin's
Club titles
- Wexford titles: 4
- Leinster titles: 1
College
| Years | College | Apps (scores) |
| 2017-present | DCU Dóchas Éireann | 3 (0-05) |
College titles
- Fitzgibbon titles: 0
Inter-county*
| Years | County | Apps (scores) |
| 2017-present | Wexford | 31 (6-132) |
Inter-county titles
- Leinster titles: 1
- All-Irelands: 0
- NHL: 0
- All Stars: 0
- *Inter County team apps and scores correct as of match played 4 May 2024.

Rory O'Connor (born 1998) is an Irish hurler who plays for Wexford Senior Championship club St Martin's and at inter-county level with the Wexford senior hurling team. He usually lines out as a left corner-forward.

== Early life ==
Born in Piercestown, County Wexford, O'Connor is the son of John O'Connor and nephew of George O'Connor, both of whom won All-Ireland medals with Wexford in 1996. His brothers, Harry O'Connor and Jack O'Connor have also played for Wexford at various levels.

== Playing career ==
=== St Peter's College ===
O'Connor first came to prominence as a hurler and Gaelic footballer with St Peter's College in Wexford. He played in every grade of hurling and Gaelic football before eventually joining the college's senior teams.

On 27 January 2017, O'Connor scored a point from midfield when St Peter's College defeated Moate Community School to win the Leinster Championship. He retained his position at midfield when St Peter's College faced St Brendan's College from Killarney in the All-Ireland final on 1 April 2017. O'Connor scored a point from play in the 0–18 to 0–10 defeat.

=== DCU Dóchas Éireann ===
As a student at Dublin City University, O'Connor immediately became involved in hurling and joined the college's freshers' hurling team in his first year. On 21 March 2018, he was selected at midfield but spent much of the game at left corner-forward when Dublin City University faced the University of Limerick in the freshers' final. O'Connor scored two points from play and ended the game with a winners' medal following the 1–20 to 2–15 victory.

=== St Martin's ===
O'Connor joined the St Martin's club at a young age and played in all grades at juvenile and underage levels as a dual player. He experienced much success in the minor, under-20 and under-21 grades, winning eight championship medals across both codes between 2014 and 2018.

On 18 October 2015, O'Connor lined out at right wing-forward when St Martin's faced St James' in the Wexford Football Championship final. He was substituted in the 55th minute and ended the game on the losing side following a 0–11 to 1–06 defeat.

O'Connor lined out in his first Wexford Hurling Championship final on 22 October 2017. He scored 0-05 from full-forward and ended the game with a winners' medal following the 2–16 to 1–09 defeat of Oulart-the Ballagh. On 29 October 2017, St Martin's had the chance to achieve the double when they faced Starlights in the Wexford Football Championship final. O'Connor scored a point from left wing-forward in the 0–17 to 1–08 defeat.

=== Wexford ===
==== Minor and under-21 ====
O'Connor first lined out for Wexford as a member of the minor team during the 2015 Leinster Championship. He made his first appearance for the team on 25 April when he came on as a substitute for Damien Reck in a 1–18 to 1–17 defeat by Kilkenny.

O'Connor was eligible for the minor grade again during the 2016 Leinster Championship. He lined out at left corner-forward in the Leinster final on 8 July 2016. O'Connor scored 0–05 in Dublin's 2–12 to 0–12 defeat. He ended the championship as top scorer with 3-33.

O'Connor was drafted onto the Wexford under-21 team in advance of the 2017 Leinster Championship. He made his first appearance in that grade on 31 May 2017 when he lined out at centre-forward in Wexford's 4–21 to 2–09 defeat of Offaly. On 5 July 2017, O'Connor scored two points from centre-forward when Wexford suffered a 0–30 to 1–15 defeat by Kilkenny in the Leinster final.

O'Connor was eligible for the under-21 grade for a second and final season in 2018. He lined out in a second successive Leinster final on 4 July. O'Connor scored seven points from centre-forward in a 4–21 to 2-26 extra-time defeat by Galway. He ended the season by being named in the centre-forward position on the Team of the Year.

==== Senior ====
O'Connor was added to the Wexford senior team during the 2017 National League but was an unused substitute throughout the campaign. On 2 July 2017, he was an unused substitute when Wexford suffered a 0–29 to 1–17 defeat by Galway in the Leinster final. O'Connor made his first appearance for the Wexford senior team on 23 July 2017 when he lined out at midfield in a 1–23 to 1-19 All-Ireland quarter-final defeat by Waterford.

Wexford reached a second Leinster final in three years on 30 June 2019. O'Connor was selected at full-forward but spent much of the game left wing-forward. He scored four points from play and collected a winners' medal following the 1–23 to 0–23 defeat of Kilkenny.

== Career statistics ==
As of match played 4 May 2024

| Team | Year | National League | | | Leinster | | All-Ireland | | Total | |
| Team | Year | Division | Apps | Score | Apps | Score | Apps | Score | Apps | Score |
|---|---|---|---|---|---|---|---|---|---|---|
| Wexford | 2017 | Division 1B | 0 | 0-00 | 0 | 0-00 | 1 | 0-02 | 1 | 0-02 |
| Wexford | 2018 | Division 1A | 5 | 0-30 | 4 | 0-36 | 1 | 0-10 | 10 | 0-76 |
| Wexford | 2019 | Division 1A | 4 | 0-11 | 5 | 2-09 | 0 | 0-00 | 9 | 2-20 |
| Wexford | 2020 | Division 1B | 5 | 1-13 | 1 | 0-03 | 1 | 0-02 | 7 | 1-18 |
| Wexford | 2021 | Division 1B | 5 | 1-14 | 2 | 1-10 | 1 | 0-02 | 8 | 2-26 |
| Wexford | 2022 | Division 1A | | | 5 | 1-18 | 2 | 1-05 | 7 | 2-23 |
| Wexford | 2023 | Division 1A | | | 5 | 0-24 | — | | 5 | 0-24 |
| Wexford | 2024 | Division 1A | | | 3 | 1-11 | — | | 3 | 1-11 |
| Career total | | | 19 | 2-68 | 25 | 5-111 | 6 | 1-21 | 50 | 8-200 |

== Honours ==
St Peter's College

- Leinster Colleges Senior Football Championship (1): 2017

DCU Dóchas Éireann

- All-Ireland Freshers' Hurling Championship (1): 2018

St Martin's

- Leinster Senior Club Hurling Championship (1): 2025
- Wexford Senior Hurling Championship (4): 2017, 2019, 2024, 2025
- Wexford Under-21 Hurling Championship (2): 2016, 2017
- Wexford Under-20 Hurling Championship (1): 2018
- Wexford Minor Hurling Championship (3): 2014, 2015, 2016
- Wexford Minor Football Championship (2): 2015, 2016

Wexford

- Leinster Senior Hurling Championship (1): 2019
