= Fenlon =

Fenlon is a surname. Notable people with the surname include:

- Adrian Fenlon (born 1972), Irish sportsperson
- Edward Fenlon (1903–2010), member of the Michigan State House of Representatives and a circuit judge in Michigan
- Gary Fenlon (born 1954), Australian politician
- Iain Fenlon (born 1949), British musicologist who specializes in music from 1450 to 1650
- Pat Fenlon (born 1969), Irish football player and manager
- Pete Fenlon (born 1955), American role-playing game designer, game developer, graphics designer, and publisher
