= John O'Connor (Wexford hurler) =

Irish hurler (born 1963)

Personal information
- Native name: Seán Ó Conchubhair (Irish)
- Born: 1963 (age 62–63) Piercetown, County Wexford, Ireland
- Occupation: Production manager

Sport
- Sport: Hurling
- Position: Left corner-back
Club
- Years: Club
- St Martin's
Club titles
- Wexford titles: 1
Inter-county
- Years: County
- 1984-1997: Wexford
Inter-county titles
- Leinster titles: 2
- All-Irelands: 1
- NHL: 0
- All Stars: 0

John O'Connor (born 1963) is an Irish former hurler. At club level, he played with St Martin's and at inter-county level was a member of the Wexford senior hurling team.

== Career ==
O'Connor first played hurling to a high standard at club level with St Martin's. He was in the twilight of his career when he won his only Wexford SHC title following a 1-11 to 1-09 defeat of Rathnure in the 1999 final.

At inter-county level, O'Connor first appeared for Wexford during a two-year tenure with the minor team. He won a Leinster MHC medal as a substitute before defeat by Tipperary in the 1980 All-Ireland minor final. O'Connor's tenure with the under-21 team ended without success.

O'Connor made his senior team debut in a Centenary Cup defeat by Roscommon in April 1984. He won a Leinster SHC medal in 1996, before playing at left corner-back when Wexford beat Limerick in the 1996 All-Ireland final. O'Connor won a second consecutive Leinster SHC medal in 1997.

== Personal life ==
O'Connor's brother, George O'Connor, also won an All-Ireland SHC with Wexford in 1996. His sons, Jack, Harry and Rory O'Connor, have also played for Wexford at various levels.

== Honours ==
St Martin's

- Wexford Senior Hurling Championship: 1999

Wexford

- All-Ireland Senior Hurling Championship: 1996
- Leinster Senior Hurling Championship: 1996, 1997
- Leinster Minor Hurling Championship: 1980
