= Shaun Murphy (hurler) =

Irish hurler (born 1990)

Personal information
- Native name: Seán Ó Murchú (Irish)
- Born: 1990 (age 35–36) Oulart, County Wexford, Ireland

Sport
- Sport: Hurling
- Position: Left wing-back
Club
- Years: Club
- 2010-present: Oulart–The Ballagh
Club titles
- Wexford titles: 6
- Leinster titles: 1
College
- Years: College
- Waterford Institute of Technology
College titles
- Fitzgibbon titles: 1
Inter-county*
Years	County	Apps (scores)
2012-2022	Wexford	20 (0-08)
Inter-county titles
- Leinster titles: 1
- All-Irelands: 0
- NHL: 0
- All Stars: 0
- *Inter County team apps and scores correct as of 21:29, 15 July 2019.

Shaun Murphy (born 1990) is an Irish hurler who plays for Wexford Senior Championship club Oulart–The Ballagh and at inter-county level with the Wexford senior hurling team. He usually lines out at left wing-back.

== Playing career ==
=== Waterford Institute of Technology ===
Murphy studied at the Waterford Institute of Technology and joined the senior hurling team in his second year at the institute. On 1 March 2014, he was an unused substitute when Waterford IT defeated the Cork Institute of Technology by 0–17 to 0–12 to win the Fitzgibbon Cup.

=== Oulart–The Ballagh ===
Murphy joined the Oulart–The Ballagh club at a young age and played in all grades at juvenile and underage levels. He joined the club's top adult team during the 2009 Wexford Senior Championship.

On 10 October 2010, Murphy lined out at left wing-forward when Oulart–The Ballagh faced St. Martin's in the Wexford Senior Championship final. He scored three points from play and ended the game with a winners' medal following the 1–14 to 0–06 victory. Murphy was again at left wing-forward when Oulart–The Ballagh suffered a 0–14 to 1–08 defeat by O'Loughlin Gaels in the Leinster final on 30 January 2011.

Murphy was moved from a forward to a defender during the 2011 Wexford Senior Championship and lined out at left wing-back when Oulart–The Ballagh faced Rathnure in the final on 9 October 2011. He scored two points from play and collected a second successive winners' medal following the 1–10 to 0–11 victory. On 27 November 2011, Murphy lined out in a second successive Leinster final but ended on the losing side once again following a 1–15 to 1–11 defeat by Coolderry.

On 14 October 2012, Murphy was dropped from the starting fifteen when Oulart–The Ballagh faced Faythe Harriers in the 2012 Wexford Senior Championship final. He was introduced as a substitute at full-forward and collected a third successive winners' medal following the 2–12 to 0–13 victory. Murphy was restored to the starting fifteen for the Leinster final against Kilcormac/Killoughey on 9 December 2012. He ended the game on the losing side for a third successive year following a 1–12 to 0–11 defeat.

On 20 October 2013, Murphy lined out at midfield Oulart–The Ballagh took on Ferns St. Aidan's in the 2013 Wexford Senior Championship final. He collected a fourth winners' medal following the 3–12 to 1–16 victory. On 1 December 2013, Murphy was again at midfield when Oulart–The Ballagh suffered an 0–11 to 0–08 defeat by Mount Leinster Rangers in a fourth successive Leinster final.

Murphy lined out in a fifth Wexford Senior Championship final on 25 October 2015. He scored two points from centre-back and collected a fifth winners' medal following the 2–15 to 0–13 defeat of St. Martin's. On 29 November 2015, Murphy was again at centre-back when Oulart–The Ballagh defeated Cuala by 2–13 to 0–13 to win the Leinster Championship.

On 16 October 2016, Murphy played in his sixth Wexford Senior Championship final. Lining out at centre-back, he ended the game with a sixth winners' medal following the 0–17 to 1–11 defeat of Cloughbawn.

Oulart–The Ballagh qualified for another Wexford Senior Championship final on 22 October 2017. Murphy again lined out centre-back, however, he ended the game on the losing side following a 2–16 to 1–09 defeat by St. Martin's.

=== Wexford ===
==== Minor and under-21 ====
Murphy first played for Wexford as a member of the minor team during the 2007 Leinster Championship. He made his first appearance for the team on 24 April 2007 when he came on as a substitute in Wexford's 1–12 to 2–04 defeat of Carlow.

Murphy was again eligible for the Wexford minor team in 2008 and became a regular member of the starting fifteen. On 6 July 2008, he lined out at left corner-back when Wexford faced Kilkenny in the Leinster final. Murphy ended the game on the losing side following the 1–19 to 0–13 defeat.

Murphy was drafted onto the Wexford under-21 team for the 2010 Leinster Championship. He made his first appearance for the team on 23 June 2010 when he lined out at right wing-back in Wexford's 2–17 to 2–13 defeat of Carlow. On 14 July 2010, Murphy was again at left wing-back when Wexford suffered a 2–15 to 0–15 defeat by Dublin in the Leinster final.

Murphy lined out in a second successive Leinster final with the Wexford under-21 team on 13 July 2011. He was selected at left wing-back and, for the second year in succession, he ended the game on the losing side following the 1–18 to 0–11 defeat.

==== Senior ====
Murphy was added to the Wexford senior team in advance of the 2012 National League. He made his Leinster Championship debut on 2 June 2012 when he lined out at midfield in a 2–13 to 1–16 defeat by Offaly.

On 2 July 2017, Murphy lined out in his first Leinster final. He was selected at midfield but spent much of the game against Galway as a sweeper. Murphy ended the game on the losing side following the 0–29 to 1–17 defeat.

On 20 January 2018, Murphy lined out at left corner-back in Wexford's 1-24 apiece draw with Kilkenny in the Walsh Cup final. Wexford won the subsequent free-taking shoot-out, with Murphy claiming his first silverware at senior level with Wexford.

Wexford reached a second Leinster final in three years on 30 June 2019. Murphy was selected at left wing-back but spent much of the game at right corner-back. He ended the game with a Leinster Championship medal following the 1–23 to 0–23 defeat of Kilkenny.

== Honours ==
Waterford Institute of Technology

- Fitzgibbon Cup (1): 2014

Oulart–The Ballagh

- Leinster Senior Club Hurling Championship (1): 2015
- Wexford Senior Hurling Championship (6): 2010, 2011, 2012, 2013, 2015, 2016

Wexford

- Leinster Senior Hurling Championship (1): 2019
