= Gavin Bailey =

Irish hurler

Personal information
- Native name: Gáibhín Báille (Irish)
- Born: 1995 (age 30–31) Ferns, County Wexford, Ireland
- Occupation: Senior associate

Sport
- Sport: Hurling
- Position: Right wing-back
Club
- Years: Club
- Ferns St Aidan's
Club titles
- Wexford titles: 0
College
- Years: College
- DCU Dóchas Éireann
College titles
- Fitzgibbon titles: 0
Inter-county
Years	County	Apps (scores)
2019-present	Wexford	0 (0-00)
Inter-county titles
- Leinster titles: 1
- All-Irelands: 0
- NHL: 0
- All Stars: 0

Gavin Bailey (born 1995) is an Irish hurler who plays for Wexford Championship club Ferns St Aidan's and at inter-county level with the Wexford senior hurling team. He usually plays as a right wing-back.

== Honours ==
Wexford

- Leinster Senior Hurling Championship: 2019
- Leinster Under-21 Hurling Championship: 2014, 2015
