= Conal Flood =

Irish hurler

Personal information
- Native name: Conal Ó Maoltuile (Irish)
- Born: 1998 (age 27–28) Clonroche, County Wexford, Ireland
- Occupation: Manufacturing Engineer

Sport
- Sport: Hurling
- Position: Left wing-back
Club
- Years: Club
- Cloughbawn
Club titles
- Wexford titles: 0
College
- Years: College
- DCU Dóchas Éireann
College titles
- Fitzgibbon titles: 0
Inter-county*
Years	County	Apps (scores)
2018-present	Wexford	1 (0-00)
Inter-county titles
- Leinster titles: 0
- All-Irelands: 0
- NHL: 0
- All Stars: 0
- *Inter County team apps and scores correct as of 22:45, 12 July 2021.

Conal Flood (born 1998) is an Irish hurler who plays for Wexford Championship club Cloughbawn and at inter-county level with the Wexford senior hurling team. He usually lines out as a wing-back.

== Career ==
Born in Clonroche, County Wexford, Flood is the son of Seán Flood and the grandson of Tim Flood who both won All-Ireland Championship titles with Wexford. He first came to hurling prominence at juvenile and underage levels with the Cloughbawn club before eventually joining the club's top adult team. Flood first played at inter-county level during a two-year stint with the Wexford minor team. He was drafted onto the Wexford senior hurling team at the start of the 2018 season, however, a subsequent cruciate knee injury ruled him out of the game for a period.

== Career statistics ==
As of 26 June 2021

Team	Year	National League			Leinster		All-Ireland		Total	
Team	Year	Division	Apps	Score	Apps	Score	Apps	Score	Apps	Score
Wexford	2018	Division 1B	0	0-00	0	0-00	0	0-00	0	0-00
Wexford	2019	Division 1A	0	0-00	0	0-00	0	0-00	0	0-00
Wexford	2020	Division 1A	1	0-02	0	0-00	0	0-00	1	0-02
Wexford	2021	Division 1A	5	0-02	1	0-00	0	0-00	6	0-02
Career total			6	0-04	1	0-00	0	0-00	7	0-04
