= Mikie Dwyer =

Irish hurler

Personal information
- Native name: Mícheál Ó Duibhir (Irish)
- Born: 1997 (age 28–29) Fethard-on-Sea, County Wexford, Ireland

Sport
- Sport: Hurling
- Position: Right corner-forward
Club
- Years: Club
- Fethard St Mogue's
Club titles
- Wexford titles: 0
Inter-county*
Years	County	Apps (scores)
2021-	Wexford	10 (2-08)
Inter-county titles
- Leinster titles: 0
- All-Irelands: 0
- NHL: 0
- All Stars: 0
- *Inter County team apps and scores correct as of 21:45, 27 June 2021.

Michael Dwyer (born 1997) is an Irish hurler who plays for Wexford Championship club Fethard St Mogue's and at inter-county level with the Wexford senior hurling team. He usually lines out as a forward.

== Career ==
Dwyer first came to hurling prominence at juvenile and underage levels with the Fethard St Mogue's club before eventually joining the club's top adult team. He was at left corner-forward when the club were beaten by Ardmore in the 2018 All-Ireland Junior Club Championship. Dwyer first played at inter-county level with the Wexford minor team during the 2015 Leinster Minor Championship before later lining out with the under-21 team. He made his senior debut during the 2021 National Hurling League.

== Career statistics ==
As of 26 June 2021

Team	Year	National League			Leinster		All-Ireland		Total	
Team	Year	Division	Apps	Score	Apps	Score	Apps	Score	Apps	Score
Wexford	2021	Division 1B	5	2-01	1	0-02	0	0-00	6	2-03
Career total			5	2-01	1	0-02	0	0-00	6	2-03

== Honours ==
Fethard St Mogue's

- Leinster Junior Club Hurling Championship: 2017
- Wexford Junior Hurling Championship: 2017
