= Mick Kinsella (hurler) =

Wexford hurler (born 1945)

Personal information
- Native name: Mícheál Cinsealach (Irish)
- Born: 1945 (age 80–81) Kilmuckridge, County Wexford, Ireland
- Occupation: Post office worker
- Height: 5 ft 11 in (180 cm)

Sport
- Sport: Hurling
- Position: Centre-back
Club
- Years: Club
- Buffers Alley
Club titles
- Wexford titles: 4
Inter-county*
Years	County	Apps (scores)
1966–1968	Wexford	2 (0–00)
Inter-county titles
- Leinster titles: 1
- All-Irelands: 1
- NHL: 1
- *Inter County team apps and scores correct as of 15:34, 23 June 2016.

Michael Kinsella (born 1945) is an Irish hurling manager, coach and former player. At club level, he played with Buffers Alley and at inter-county level with the Wexford county hurling team.

== Playing career ==
Kinsella was educated at Gorey CBS before later attending St Peter's College in Wexford. As a member of the college hurling team, he won a Leinster Colleges SHC medal before claiming a Dr Croke Cup medal following a 4-11 to 2-04 defeat of Ennis CBS in the 1962 All-Ireland colleges final replay.

At club level, Kinsella first lined out with Buffers Alley at juvenile and underage levels before progressing to the club's adult team. He won his first Wexford SHC medal in 1968 after a win over Faythe Harriers in the final. Kinsella won further Wexford SHC medals in 1970, 1975 and 1976.

Kinsella first appeared on the inter-county scene for Wexford as a member of the minor team that beat Limerick by 6-12 to 5-09 to win the All-Ireland MHC title in 1963. He immediately progressed to the under-21 team and won three successive Leinster U21HC medals as well as an All-Ireland U21HC medal after a 3-07 to 1-04 win over Tipperary.

After winning an All-Ireland IHC medal as a substitute in 1964, Kinsella later made his senior team debut. He added a National Hurling League medal to his collection in 1967. Kinsella completed the set of inter-county honours by winning a Leinster SHC medal in 1968, before later winning an All-Ireland SHC medal as a substitute after a 5-08 to 3-12 victory over Tipperary.

== Management career ==
Kinsella also held managerial positions with various club teams. He managed the Dunhill club in Waterford to consecutive Waterford SHC titles in 1978 and 1979. Kinsella later managed the Arklow Rock Parnells to the Wicklow SHC title in 1982. A return to Waterford saw him guide the Passage club to the Waterford IHC title in 1988. Kinsella also served as coach of the Wexford senior team.

== Honours ==
=== Player ===
St Peter's College

- All-Ireland Colleges Senior Hurling Championship: 1962
- Leinster Colleges Senior Hurling Championship: 1962

Buffers Alley

- Wexford Senior Hurling Championship: 1968, 1970, 1975, 1976
- Wexford Intermediate Football Championship: 1974
- Wexford Junior A Football Championship: 1972

Wexford

- All-Ireland Senior Hurling Championship: 1968
- Leinster Senior Hurling Championship: 1968
- National Hurling League: 1966–67
- All-Ireland Intermediate Hurling Championship: 1964
- Leinster Intermediate Hurling Championship: 1964
- All-Ireland Under-21 Hurling Championship: 1965
- Leinster Under-21 Hurling Championship: 1964, 1965, 1966
- All-Ireland Minor Hurling Championship: 1963
- Leinster Minor Hurling Championship: 1963

=== Management ===
Dunhill

- Waterford Senior Hurling Championship: 1978, 1979

Arklow Rock Parnells GAA

- Wicklow Senior Hurling Championship: 1982

Passage

- Waterford Intermediate Hurling Championship: 1988
