= Adrian Fenlon =

Irish sportsperson

Personal information
- Native name: Andrias Ó Fionnaláin (Irish)
- Nickname: Feno
- Born: 1973 (age 52–53) Enniscorthy, County Wexford, Ireland
- Occupation: Pharmaceutical executive

Sport
- Sport: Hurling
- Position: Midfield
Club
- Years: Club
- Rapparees Starlights
Club titles
| | Football | Hurling |
| Wexford titles | 2 | 0 |
Inter-county
- Years: County
- 1993-2005: Wexford
Inter-county titles
- Leinster titles: 3
- All-Irelands: 1
- NHL: 0
- All Stars: 1

Adrian Fenlon (born 1973) is an Irish former hurler. At club level, he played with Rapparees Starlights and at inter-county level was a member of the Wexford senior hurling team.

== Career ==
Fenlon first played hurling to a high standard as a student at Enniscorty CBS. He lined out in all grades during his time there and won a Leinster Colleges JBHC title in 1987, following a defeat of Callan CBS in the final. Fenlon was also part of the team beaten by 3-06 to 3-02 by Presentation College, Athenry in the subsequent All-Ireland final.

At club level, Fenlon first played for the Rapparees Starlights club as a dual player in the juvenile and underage grades before progressing to adult level. He had his first senior success in 2022 when the club beat Duffry Rovers in a replay to take the Wexford SFC title. Fenlon added a second SFC medal to his collection in 2004 after a defeat of Sarsfields in the final.

Fenlon first appeared on the inter-county scene with Wexford as a member of the minor team in 1991. He later spent an unsuccessful tenure with the under-21 team. Fenlon was still eligible for the under-21 grade when he made his senior team debut in 1993 and quickly became a regular member of the starting fifteen. He won a Leinster SHC medal in 1996, before playing at midfield when Wexford beat Limerick in the 1996 All-Ireland final. Fenlon ended the season with an All-Star award.

A second Leinster SHC medal followed for Fenlon in 1997, when Wexford retained the title after a defeat of Kilkenny. He claimed a third Leinster winner's medal after a defeat of Offaly in 2004. Fenlon also earned selection for the Leinster team and won a Railway Cup medal in 1998. He confirmed his retirement from inter-county hurling in March 2006.

== Honours ==
Enniscorthy CBS

- Leinster Colleges Junior B Hurling Championship: 1987

Rapparees Starlights

- Wexford Senior Football Championship: 2002, 2004

Wexford

- All-Ireland Senior Hurling Championship: 1996
- Leinster Senior Hurling Championship: 1996, 1997, 2004

Leinster

- Railway Cup: 1998
