= Christy Keogh =

Wexford hurler

Personal information
- Native name: Criostóir Mac Eochaidh (Irish)
- Born: 29 June 1943 Enniscorthy, County Wexford, Ireland
- Died: 19 July 2002 (aged 59) Enniscorthy, County Wexford, Ireland
- Height: 6 ft 2 in (188 cm)

Sport
- Sport: Hurling
- Position: Left corner-forward
Clubs
- Years: Club
- Rapparees; Shamrocks
Inter-county*
Years	County	Apps (scores)
1971–1979	Wexford	23 (3–32)
Inter-county titles
- Leinster titles: 2
- All-Irelands: 0
- NHL: 1
- All Stars: 1
- *Inter County team apps and scores correct as of 22:52, 20 October 2013.

Christy Keogh (29 June 1943 – 19 July 2002) was an Irish hurler who played as a left corner-forward at senior level for the Wexford county team.

Born in Enniscorthy, County Wexford, Keogh arrived on the inter-county scene at the age of twenty-eight when he first linked up with the Wexford senior team. He made his debut in the 1971 championship. Keogh went on to play a key part for the rest of the decade, and won two Leinster medals and one National Hurling League medal. He was an All-Ireland runner-up on two occasions.

Keogh represented the Leinster inter-provincial team at various times throughout his career, winning one Railway Cup medals in 1974. At club level he played with Rapparees and Shamrocks.

Throughout his career, Keogh made 23 championship appearances for Wexford. His retirement came following Wexford's defeat by Kilkenny in the 1979 championship.

In retirement from playing Keogh became involved in coaching and team management. He served as manager of the Wexford senior hurling team on three separate occasions.
