= 2019 Leinster Senior Hurling Championship =

Leinster Senior Hurling Championship
Tournament details
- Year: 2019
- Date: 11 May–30 June
- Teams: 5
- Defending champions: Galway

Winners
- Champions: Wexford (21st win)
- Manager: Davy Fitzgerald
- Captain: Lee Chin; Matthew O'Hanlon
- Qualify for: Leinster SHC Final; All-Ireland SHC

Runners-up
- Runners-up: Kilkenny
- Manager: Brian Cody
- Captain: T. J. Reid

Promotion/Relegation
- Promoted team(s): Laois
- Relegated team(s): Carlow

Other
- Matches played: 11

The 2019 Leinster Senior Hurling Championship is the 2019 installment of the annual Leinster Senior Hurling Championship organised by Leinster GAA.

Galway were the defending champions, but were eliminated in controversial circumstances in Round 5 and finished fourth in the province, despite having the same number of points as Dublin and Leinster finalists Kilkenny and Wexford. Wexford defeated Kilkenny in the final.

== Teams ==
The Leinster championship was contested by four counties from the Irish province of Leinster, as well as one county from the Irish province of Connacht, where the sport is only capable of supporting one county team at this level.

| Team | Location | Stadium | Capacity |
|---|---|---|---|
| Carlow | Carlow | Netwatch Cullen Park | 21,000 |
| Dublin | Dublin | Parnell Park | 9,000 |
| Galway | Galway | Pearse Stadium | 26,197 |
| Kilkenny | Kilkenny | Nowlan Park | 27,800 |
| Wexford | Wexford | Innovate Wexford Park | 25,000 |

== Personnel and colours ==
| Team | Colours | Captain(s) | Manager(s) | Most recent success | | | Main Sponsor |
| Team | Colours | Captain(s) | Manager(s) | All-Ireland | Provincial | League | Main Sponsor |
|---|---|---|---|---|---|---|---|
| Carlow | | Diarmuid Byrne; Richard Coady | Colm Bonnar | | | | IT Carlow |
| Dublin | | Seán Moran | Mattie Kenny | 1938 | 2013 | 2011 | AIG |
| Galway | | David Burke | Micheál Donoghue | 2017 | 2018 | 2017 | Supermac's |
| Kilkenny | | T. J. Reid | Brian Cody | 2015 | 2016 | 2018 | Glanbia |
| Wexford | | Lee Chin; Matthew O'Hanlon | Davy Fitzgerald | 1996 | 2004 | 1972–73 | Gain |

== Group table ==
Key to colours
| Advance to Leinster final |
| Advance to preliminary quarter-finals |
| Relegation |

| Pos | Team | Pld | W | D | L | SF | SA | Diff | Pts |
|---|---|---|---|---|---|---|---|---|---|
| 1 | Kilkenny | 4 | 2 | 1 | 1 | 8-85 | 5-76 | 18 | 5 |
| 2 | Wexford | 4 | 1 | 3 | 0 | 4-84 | 2-75 | 15 | 5 |
| 3 | Dublin | 4 | 2 | 1 | 1 | 7-84 | 5-79 | 11 | 5 |
| 4 | Galway | 4 | 2 | 1 | 1 | 4-84 | 6-75 | 3 | 5 |
| 5 | Carlow (R) | 4 | 0 | 0 | 4 | 3-64 | 8-96 | –47 | 0 |

Carlow were relegated to the 2020 Joe McDonagh Cup, because the winners of the 2019 Joe McDonagh Cup were from Leinster (Laois).

== Group matches ==
=== Round 1 ===
| 11 May 2019 Round 1 | Kilkenny | 2-23 (29) – (24) 1-21 | Dublin | Kilkenny |
| 19:00 | | (HT: 0-12 - 1-13) | | Venue: Nowlan Park |
| | Gls: TJ Reid 2 (1pen); Pts: TJ Reid 12 (11f, 1’65) A Murphy 3, G Aylward 2, R Leahy 2, A Mullen 1, W Walsh 1, T Walsh 1, P Walsh 1 | Report | Gls: S Moran 1 (1 pen). Pts: D Treacy 6 (6f), S Moran 2 (1 pen, 1f), D Sutcliffe 4, C Crummey 2, F Whitely 2, S Treacy 1, D O’Connell 1, P Ryan 1, L Rushe 1, T Connolly 1. | Referee: C McAllister (Cork); Attendance: 9,495; TV: Sky Sports |

| 12 May 2019 Round 1 | Galway | 1-24 (27) – (21) 1-18 | Carlow | Salthill |
| 15:30 | | (HT: 0-14 - 0-8) | | Venue: Pearse Stadium |
| | Gls: C Cooney 1 Pts: N Burke 6 (6f), C Whelan 4, C Mannion 3, C Cooney 3, J Flynn 3, J Grealish 1, P Mannion 1, D Burke 1, B Concannon 1, D Glennon 1 | Report | Gls: C Nolan 1 Pts: M Kavanagh 11 (6f), S Murphy 2, C Nolan 2, J Kavanagh 1, J M Nolan 1, J Doyle 1 | Referee: C Lyons (Cork); Attendance: 6,097 |

=== Round 2 ===
| 19 May 2019 Round 2 | Carlow | 1-14 (17) – (31) 3-22 | Kilkenny | Carlow |
| 15:00 | | | | Venue: Netwatch Cullen Park |
| | Gls: J Doyle 1 Pts: M Kavanagh 5 (4f), C Nolan 3 (1f), S Murphy 2, J Doyle 1, J Kavanagh 1, D English 1, B Tracy 1 (1f) | Report | Gls: TJ Reid 1 (1pen), C Fennelly 1, G Aylward 1 Pts: TJ Reid 12 (8f, 1'65), J Donnelly 2, A Murphy 2, C Fennelly 1, G Alyward 1, R Leahy 1, W Walsh 1, A Mullen 1, B Ryan 1 | Referee: A Kelly (Galway); Attendance: 7,050 |

| 19 May 2019 Round 2 | Dublin | 1-22 (25) – (25) 2-19 | Wexford | Dublin |
| 15:00 | | | | Venue: Parnell Park |
| | Gls: S Moran 1 (1f); Pts: P Ryan 10 (7f, 1'65), C Boland 3, S Moran 2 (1f), C Keaney 2, T Connolly 2, C Crummey 1, E Dillon 1, F Whitely 1 | Report | Gls: L Og McGovern 1, R O'Connor 1 Pts: L Chin 11 (8f, 2'65), C McDonald 3 (2sl), S Murphy 3, L Og McGovern 1, A Nolan 1. | Referee: F Horgan (Tipperary) |

=== Round 3 ===
| 26 May 2019 Round 3 | Galway | 0-16 (16) – (16) 0-16 | Wexford | Salthill |
| 16:00 | | (HT: 0-10 - 0-04) | | Venue: Pearse Stadium |
| | Pts: J Flynn 6 (3f, 1'65), N Burke 4 (3f, 1'65), C Whelan 3, D Burke 1, C Cooney 1, C Mannion 1 | | Pts: L Chin 7 (6f, 1'65), C Dunbar 2, R O’Connor 2, D O’Keeffe 1, A Nolan 1, L Og McGovern 1, C McDonald 1, S Murphy 1. | Referee: J Murphy (Limerick); Attendance: 12,624; TV: RTÉ |

| 2 June 2019 Round 3 | Carlow | 1-13 (16) – (28) 2-22 | Dublin | Carlow |
| 15:00 | | (HT: 0-08 - 2-10) | | Venue: Netwatch Cullen Park |
| | Gls: J Doyle 1 Pts: M Kavanagh 4 (2f), C Nolan 4 (2f), S Whelan 2, J Kavanagh 1, JM Nolan 1, E Byrne 1, | | Gls: E Dillon 2 Pts: P Ryan 9 (5f), C Kearney 4, R Hayes 2, E Dillon 2, F Whitely 2, E O'Donnell 1, T Connolly 1, C Boland 1 | Referee: J Keenan (Wicklow); Attendance: 3,500 |

=== Round 4 ===
| 8 June 2019 Round 4 | Wexford | 2-28 (34) – (19) 0-19 | Carlow | Wexford |
| 19:00 | | | | Venue: Innovate Wexford Park |
| | Gls: C McDonald 1, R O'Connor 1 Pts: L Chin 11 (8 frees, 1 '65), C McDonald 4, C Dunbar 3, P Morris 2, D O'Keeffe 2, P Foley 2, R O'Connor 1, S Casey 1, J O'Connor 1, D Dunne 1. | Report | Pts: M Kavanagh 13 (1 '65, 9 frees), C Nolan 2, E Nolan 1, S Whelan 1, JM Nolan 1, E Byrne 1. | Referee: C Cunning (Antrim); Attendance: 6,500 |

| 9 June 2019 Round 4 | Kilkenny | 2-22 (28) – (29) 3-20 | Galway | Kilkenny |
| 14:00 | | | | Venue: Nowlan Park |
| | Gls: TJ Reid 2. Pts: TJ Reid 11 (6f, 1'65'), B Ryan 3, B Sheehan 2, R Leahy 2, C Fennelly 1, A Murphy 1, P Deegan 1, C Fennelly 1. | Report | Gls: C Whelan 1, B Concannon 1, J Coen 1. Pts: C Mannion 8 (1f), J Flynn 3 (2f), C Whelan 2, A Tuohey 2, B Concannon 2, J Coen 1, J Glynn 1, David Burke 1. | Referee: C Lyons (Cork); Attendance: 15,778; TV: RTÉ |

=== Round 5 ===
| 15 June 2019 Round 5 | Wexford | 0-21 (21) – (21) 1-18 | Kilkenny | Wexford |
| 19:00 | | | | Venue: Innovate Wexford Park |
| | Pts: L Chin 6 (6f), D O'Keeffe 4, R O'Connor 2, P Morris 2, C McDonald 2, J O'Connor 2, P Foley 2 (2f), K Foley 1 | Report | Gls: A Mullen 1 Pts: TJ Reid 7 (7f), A Mullen 3, C Fennelly 2, P Murphy 1, J Holden 1, C Fogarty 1, P Walsh 1, P Deegan 1, W Walsh 1 | Referee: Fergal Horan (Tipperary); Attendance: 15,200; TV: Sky Sports |

| 15 June 2019 Round 5 | Dublin | 3-19 (28) – (24) 0-24 | Galway | Dublin |
| 19:00 | | | | Venue: Parnell Park |
| | Gls: E Dillon 1, S Moran 1 (p), C Crummey 1 Pts: O O'Rorke 9 (5f, 1 '65), C Keaney 3, D Sutcliffe 2, C Boland 2, E Dillon 1, L Rushe 1, A Nolan 1 | Report | Pts: C Mannion 9 (7f), D Burke 3, J Flynn 3, J Canning 2, C Callanan 1 (f), J Coen 1, D Glennon 1, C Whelan 1, B Concannon 1, J Cooney 1, P Mannion 1 | TV: Sky Sports |

== Final ==
30 June 2019
Final

Report

| Wexford | 1-23 (26) – (23) 0-23 | Kilkenny |
|---|---|---|
(HT: 0-14 - 0-15)
| Gls: M Fanning 1. Pts: L Chin 9 (7f, 1 65), C McDonald 4, R O'Connor 4, D O'Keeffe 2, S Donohoe 1, P Morris 1, L Og McGovern 1, M Fanning 1, J O'Connor 1. | | Pts: TJ Reid 12 (7f, 1 65), A Mullen 3, W Walsh 2, C Fennelly 2, A Murphy 1, J Maher 1, E Murphy 1, G Aylward 1. |

Croke Park, Dublin
Referee: J Keenan (Wicklow)
Attendance: 51,482

== See also ==
- 2019 All-Ireland Senior Hurling Championship
  - 2019 Munster Senior Hurling Championship
  - 2019 Joe McDonagh Cup
