= 2017 Wexford Senior Football Championship =

Wexford S.F.C.
- Season: 2017
- Champions: Starlights (10th title)
- Relegated: Horeswood
- All Ireland SCFC: n/a
- Winning Captain: Tom Wall
- Man of the Match: Darragh Pepper

The 2017 Wexford Senior Football Championship was the 119th edition of the Wexford GAA's premier club Gaelic football tournament for senior graded teams in County Wexford, Ireland. The tournament consisted of 12 teams, with the winner going on to represent Wexford in the Leinster Senior Club Football Championship. The championship started with a group stage and then progressed to a knock out stage.

Gusserane O'Rahillys were the defending champions after they defeated Glynn–Barntown in the previous year's final.

This was Taghmon-Camross' return to the senior grade after claiming the 2016 Wexford Intermediate Football Championship title.

Horeswood were relegated to the 2018 I.F.C. after 19 years as a senior club when losing the Relegation final to Sarsfields.

== Team changes ==
The following teams have changed division since the 2016 championship season.

=== To S.F.C. ===
Promoted from 2016 Wexford Intermediate Football Championship

- Taghmon–Camross – (Intermediate Champions)

=== From S.F.C. ===
Relegated to 2017 Wexford Intermediate Football Championship

- Adamstown St Abban's

== Group stage ==
There are 2 groups called Group A and B. The top 4 in each group qualify for the quarter-finals. The bottom finisher in each group will qualify for the Relegation Final.

=== Group A ===
Team	Pld	W	L	D	PF	PA	PD	Pts
Shelmaliers	5	4	1	0	75	62	+13	8
Castletown Liam Mellows	5	3	2	0	69	53	+16	6
Starlights	5	3	2	0	76	68	+8	6
Glynn–Barntown	5	3	2	0	67	67	0	6
St Anne's Rathangan	5	2	3	0	57	66	-9	4
Sarsfields	5	0	5	0	58	76	-18	0

==== Round 1 ====
4/21/17; 20:30	Shelmaliers	1-13 – 2-9	Starlights	St Patrick's Park; Referee: Kevin Carty (Sarsfields)
4/21/17; 20:30	Eoin Doyle 1-1, Eoghan Nolan 0-3f, Brian Malone, Conor Hearne, Barry O'Connor 0-2 each, Aaron Murphy, Glen Malone, Simon Donohoe 0-1 each		Darragh Pepper 2-1, Dillon Redmond 0-3, Liam Ryan, Nick Doyle, Ryan Mahon (0-1f), Alan Tobin, Brendan Kearney (0-1f) 0-1 each	St Patrick's Park; Referee: Kevin Carty (Sarsfields)

4/22/17; 18:45	St Anne's	1-10 – 1-9	Glynn–Barntown	Wexford Park; Referee: Sean Whelan (St. Martin's)
4/22/17; 18:45	Sean Kenny 1-1 (0-1f), Redmond Barry 0-4 (0-3f), Jonathan Fogarty 0-2, Sean Gaul (0-1f), Mark Furlong, Andy Kennedy 0-1 each		Mark Fanning 0-4 (0-3f), Craig Doyle 1-0, Rioghan Crosbie 0-2, James Stafford, Michael O'Regan (0-1f), Robert Dempsey 0-1 each	Wexford Park; Referee: Sean Whelan (St. Martin's)

4/22/17; 14:00	Castletown	2-13 – 0-6	Sarsfields	Bellefield; Referee: Pat Kehoe (Ratharogue-Cushinstown)
4/22/17; 14:00	Joe Gardiner 1-1, Colin Kennedy 1-0, Robbie Brooks 0-3, Donnacha Holmes, Andy Merrigan, Ben Brosnan (0-2f) 0-2 each, Conor Carty, Jody O'Shaughnessy, Pierce Maxwell 0-1 each		Eoin Roche 0-4 (0-3f), John Bridges (0-1f) and Dylan Furlong 0-1 each	Bellefield; Referee: Pat Kehoe (Ratharogue-Cushinstown)

==== Round 2 ====
4/28/17; 19:00	Castletown	2-13 – 1-8	St Anne's	St Patrick's Park; Referee: Barry Redmond (Clonard)
4/28/17; 19:00	Donnaca Holmes 2-4, Ben Brosnan 0-4 (0-1f), Conor Carty 0-2 (0-1f), Peter Devine, Richard Farrell, Andy Merrigan 0-1 each		Andy Kennedy 1-1, Sean Kelly 0-4f, Ben Moore, Redmond Barry, Mark Furlong 0-1 each	St Patrick's Park; Referee: Barry Redmond (Clonard)

4/28/17; 20:30	Starlights	2-14 – 4-5	Glynn–Barntown	St Patrick's Park; Referee: Fintan O'Reilly (Kilmore)
4/28/17; 20:30	Dillon Redmond 2-4 (2-0 pen, 0-2f), Brendan Kearney 0-4f, Kevin Foley 0-3, Darragh Pepper 0-2, Alan Tobin 0-1		Mark Fanning 2-2 (1-0 pen, 0-2f), Robert Dempsey 1-1, Michael O'Regan 1-0, Nigel Usher and Barry Doyle 0-1 each	St Patrick's Park; Referee: Fintan O'Reilly (Kilmore)

4/29/17; 17:30	Shelmaliers	2-14 – 2-8	Sarsfields	Wexford Park; Referee: James Mullally (Gusserane)
4/29/17; 17:30	Eoghan Nolan 0-6 (0-3f), Aaron Murphy and Conor Hearne 1-1, Paraic O'Leary 0-2, Tommy Barron, Brian Murphy, Glen Malone, Brian Malone 0-1 each		Lee Chin 2-4 (0-2f), David Mooney 0-3 (0-2f), John Bridges 0-1	Wexford Park; Referee: James Mullally (Gusserane)

==== Round 3 ====
8/4/17; 19:00	Starlights	1-12 – 1-11	St Anne's	Hollymount; Referee: Barry Redmond (Clonard)
8/4/17; 19:00	Kevin Foley 0-5, Liam Ryan 1-0, Richard Farrell 0-3 (1 '45), Jack Kelly 0-2, Jason Russell and Killian Lett 0-1 each	Report	Sean Kelly 0-6 (0-4f), Michael O'Brien 1-0, Jonathan Fogarty 0-2, Diarmuid O'Keeffe, Redmond Barry (0-1f), Francis Simpson 0-1 each	Hollymount; Referee: Barry Redmond (Clonard)

8/4/17; 20:30	Glynn–Barntown	2-6 – 1-8	Sarsfields	Hollymount; Referee: David Jenkins (Gusserane)
8/4/17; 20:30	Robert Dempsey 2-2, Mark Fanning 0-2 (0-1f), Alan Cowman and Rioghan Crosbie (0-1f) 0-1 each		Dylan Furlong 1-0, Lee Smith 0-3f, Michael Hanrahan, Eoin Roche, John Bridges (0-1f), Lee Chin (0-1f), David Mooney (0-1f)	Hollymount; Referee: David Jenkins (Gusserane)

8/6/17; 12:00	Shelmaliers	2-8 – 0-9	Castletown	Wexford Park; Referee: John Carton (Monageer–Boolavogue)
8/6/17; 12:00	Andre O'Brien and Conor Hearne 1-1 each, Eoghan Nolan 0-2 (0-1f), Aaron Murphy, Simon Donohoe, Eoin Doyle, Colin Cleary 0-1 each		Ben Brosnan 0-6 (0-4f), Conor Carty 0-2 (0-1f), Richard Farrell 0-1	Wexford Park; Referee: John Carton (Monageer–Boolavogue)

==== Round 4 ====
8/18/17; 19:00	Glynn–Barntown	1-12 – 1-10	Shelmaliers	Taghmon; Referee: Seán Whelan (St Martin's)
8/18/17; 19:00	Gary Delaney 0-8 (0-6f, 2 '45), Mark Fanning 1-0, Craig Doyle 0-2, Nigel Usher and James Stafford 0-1 each	Report	Eoghan Nolan 0-4 (0-3f), Simon Donohoe 1-0, Colin Cleary 0-3f, Jody Donohoe 0-2, Glen Malone 0-1	Taghmon; Referee: Seán Whelan (St Martin's)

8/20/17; 12:00	Castletown	0-12 – 0-11	Starlights	Wexford Park; Referee: James Mullally (Gusserane)
8/20/17; 12:00	Ben Brosnan 0-4 (0-2f), Andy Merrigan 0-3, Donnacha Holmes 0-2, Peter Devine, Conor Carty (0-1f), Pierce Maxwell 0-1 each	Report	Alan Tobin (0-3f) and Dillon Redmond (0-2f, 1 '45) 0-4 each, Nick Doyle, Richard Farrell, Eamonn Furlong 0-1 each	Wexford Park; Referee: James Mullally (Gusserane)

8/20/17; 13:30	St Anne's	0-10 – 0-8	Sarsfields	Wexford Park; Referee: James Flood (St Mary's Maudlintown)
8/20/17; 13:30	Liam Rochford and Redmond Barry (0-1f) 0-3 each, Sean Kelly 0-2 (0-1f), Mark Furlong and David Fogarty 0-1 each	Report	Lee Smith 0-3f, Dylan Furlong and Kevin Gore 0-2 each, John Bridges 0-1	Wexford Park; Referee: James Flood (St Mary's Maudlintown)

==== Round 5 ====
9/1/17; 20:30	Shelmaliers	0-12 – 0-9	St Anne's	Cushintown; Referee: Anthony Tobin (Geraldine O'Hanrahans)
9/1/17; 20:30	Eoghan Nolan 0-4 (0-3f), Simon Donohoe 0-3, Aaron Murphy 0-2, Graham Staples, Conor Hearne, Colin Cleary 0-1 each	Report	Redmond Barry 0-6 (0-5f), Francis Simpson 0-2, Diarmuid O'Keeffe 0-1	Cushintown; Referee: Anthony Tobin (Geraldine O'Hanrahans)

9/1/17; 20:30	Glynn–Barntown	1-8 – 1-7	Castletown	St Patrick's Park; Referee: David Jenkins (Gusserane)
9/1/17; 20:30	Gary Dealey 1-4 (0-3f, 1 '45), Mark Fanning 0-3, Craig Doyle 0-1		Conor Carty 1-3 (0-2f), Colin Kennedy 0-2, Peter Devine and James Holmes 0-1 each	St Patrick's Park; Referee: David Jenkins (Gusserane)

9/1/17; 20:30	Starlights	1-12 – 1-6	Sarsfields	Bree; Referee: Brendan Holohan (Rathgarogue-Cushinstown)
9/1/17; 20:30	Dillon Redmond 1-3 (1-0 pen), Alan Tobin 0-3 (0-1f), Rory O'Connor, Liam Ryan, Richie Farrell, Eamonn Furlong, Ryan Mahon, Tomas Mahon 0-1 each	Report	Lee Chin 1-4 (1-0 pen, 0-4f) and David Mooney 0-2	Bree; Referee: Brendan Holohan (Rathgarogue-Cushinstown)

=== Group B ===
Team	Pld	W	L	D	PF	PA	PD	Pts
St Martin's	5	4	0	1	91	44	+47	9
St James'	5	2	2	1	64	70	-6	5
Taghmon–Camross	5	2	2	1	69	76	-7	5
Gusserane O'Rahilly's	5	2	3	0	68	77	-9	4
St Mogue's Fethard	5	1	2	2	46	60	-14	4
Horeswood	5	1	3	1	72	83	-11	3

==== Round 1 ====
4/22/17; 17:00	St Martin's	0-22 – 0-8	Taghmon–Camross	Wexford Park; Referee: Billy Dodd (Sarsfields)
4/22/17; 17:00	Ciaran Lyng 0-5 (0-2f), Rory O'Connor and Barry O'Connor 0-3 each, Jack O'Connor, Jamie Carty, Edward O'Byrne 0-2, Conor Firman, Aaron Maddock, Jake Firman, Darren Codd, Joe Coleman 0-1 each		Seamie McLoughlin 0-6 (0-2f), Michael O'Gorman (0-1f) and Ian Carty 0-1 each	Wexford Park; Referee: Billy Dodd (Sarsfields)

4/23/17; 14:00	Gusserane O'Rahillys	0-19 – 1-13	Horeswood	O'Kennedy Park; Referee: Damien Donovan (Volunteers)
4/23/17; 14:00	Adrian Flynn 0-8 (0-2f), Sean Ryan 0-4, Kenneth Cahill 0-2, Graeme Cullen, Cillian Kehoe, Paraic Conway, Sam Wall, Paul Wall 0-1 each	Report	PJ Banville 0-5 (0-4f), Eric Banville 1-1, Declan Murphy 0-3 (0-2f), David Larkin 0-2, Sean Stafford and Darren Shannon 0-1 each	O'Kennedy Park; Referee: Damien Donovan (Volunteers)

4/23/17; 15:30	Fethard	0-12 – 1-7	St James'	O'Kennedy Park; Referee: David Jenkins (Gusserane)
4/23/17; 15:30	Kevin Rowe 0-6 (0-5f), Ciaran Dwyer 0-2, Daire Barden, Garrett Foley, Joe Sutton, John Tubritt 0-1 each	Report	Kevin O'Grady 1-4 (1-0 pen, 0-2f), Darragh Lyons, Tommy Walsh, Brian Molloy 0-1 each	O'Kennedy Park; Referee: David Jenkins (Gusserane)

==== Round 2 ====
4/29/17; 19:15	Fethard	1-7 – 0-10	Taghmon–Camross	Wexford Park; Referee: James Flood (St Mary's Maudlintown)
4/29/17; 19:15	John Tubritt 1-4, Ruairi Tubrid, Kevin Rowe (0-1f), Garrett Foley 0-1 each		Stephen O'Gorman 0-3, Seamus McLoughlin (0-1f) and Ian Carty (0-2f) 0-2 each, David O'Keefe, Darren Carty, Luke Sinnott 0-1 each	Wexford Park; Referee: James Flood (St Mary's Maudlintown)

4/30/17; 14:00	St Martin's	2-15 – 1-9	Horeswood	O'Kennedy Park; Referee: Billy Dodd
4/30/17; 14:00	Jamie Carty (1 '45) and Daithi Waters 1-2 each, Ciaran Lyng 0-4, Jake Firman, Barry O'Connor (0-1f), Joe Coleman 0-2 each, Conor Firman and Patrick O'Connor 0-1 each		Eric Banville 1-1, Sean Nolan 0-3, Declan Murphy (0-2f) and PJ Banville (0-1f) 0-2 each, David Larkin 0-1	O'Kennedy Park; Referee: Billy Dodd

4/30/17; 15:45	Gusserane O'Rahillys	3-6 – 1-13	St James'	O'Kennedy Park; Referee: Anthony Tobin (Geraldine O'Hanrahans)
4/30/17; 15:45	Kenneth Cahill, Robbie Corcoran, Paul Wall 1-0 each, Jack Burford 2 '45, Adrian Flynn (0-1f), Mark Rossiter (0-1f), Paraic Conway, Sean Ryan 0-1 each		Matthew O'Hanlon 0-4 (2 '45), Adam Parle 1-1, Kevin O'Grady, Brian Molloy, Jamie Myler (0-1f) 0-2 each, David Doyle and Tommy Walsh 0-1 each	O'Kennedy Park; Referee: Anthony Tobin (Geraldine O'Hanrahans)

==== Round 3 ====
8/5/17; 18:00	St Martin's	1-8 – 0-11	Fethard	O'Kennedy Park; Referee: Anthony Tobin (Geraldine O'Hanrahans)
8/5/17; 18:00	Joe Coleman 0-4, Patrick O'Connor 1-0, Daithi Waters, Jake Firman, Ciaran Lyng (0-1f), Barry O'Connor 0-1 each		Mikie Dwyer 0-3 (0-1f), Kevin Rowe (0-1f) and John Tubritt 0-2 each, Daire Barden, Richie Waters, Garrett Foley, Jesse Foley 0-1 each	O'Kennedy Park; Referee: Anthony Tobin (Geraldine O'Hanrahans)

8/5/17; 19:30	St James	0-15 – 1-12	Horeswood	O'Kennedy Park; Referee: Kevin Carty (Sarsfields)
8/5/17; 19:30	Kevin O'Grady 0-6, Jamie Myler 0-5 (0-3f), Brian Molloy 0-2, David Doyle and Tommy Walsh 0-1 each	Report	Declan Murphy 0-5 (0-2f), David Shannon 1-1 (1-0 pen, 0-1f), Leigh O'Brien 0-3, Sean Nolan 0-2, David Larkin 0-1	O'Kennedy Park; Referee: Kevin Carty (Sarsfields)

8/6/17; 13:30	Taghmon–Camross	3-11 – 0-12	Gusserane O'Rahillys	Wexford Park; Referee: Billy Dodd (Sarsfields)
8/6/17; 13:30	Ian Carty 3-1, Seamus McLoughlin 0-5 (0-1f, 1 '45), Barry O'Gorman 0-2, Stephen Stafford, Darren Carty, Luke Sinnott 0-1 each	Report	Shane Cullen 0-4 (0-2f), Sam Wall and Mark Rossiter (0-2f) 0-2 each, Adrian Redmond, Paraic Conway, Sean Ryan (1 sl), Kenneth Cahill (0-1 pen) 0-1 each	Wexford Park; Referee: Billy Dodd (Sarsfields)

==== Round 4 ====
8/18/17; 20:30	St Martin's	0-16 – 0-8	St James'	Taghmon; Referee: Anthony Tobin (Geraldine O'Hanrahans)
8/18/17; 20:30	Ciaran Lyng 0-8 (0-4f), Darren Codd and Ryan Murphy 0-2 each, Ben Maddock, Daithi Waters, Jake Firman, Joe Coleman 0-1 each	Report	Jamie Myler 0-4 (0-3f), Brian Molloy 0-2 (0-1f), Graeme Molloy and Shane Murphy 0-1 each	Taghmon; Referee: Anthony Tobin (Geraldine O'Hanrahans)

8/19/17; 17:30	Gusserane O'Rahillys	1-14 – 0-4	Fethard	O'Kennedy Park; Referee: Kevin Carty (Sarsfields)
8/19/17; 17:30	Kenneth Cahill 1-2 (1-0 pen), Mark Rossiter (0-2f) and Sean Ryan 0-3 each, Paraic Conway and Sam Wall 0-2 each, Adrian Redmond and Paul Wall 0-1 each	Report	Mikie Dwyer 0-2 (0-1f), Daire Barden and Mark Wallace 0-1 each	O'Kennedy Park; Referee: Kevin Carty (Sarsfields)

8/19/17; 19:00	Taghmon–Camross	3-10 – 2-11	Horeswood	O'Kennedy Park; Referee: Barry Redmond (Clonard)
8/19/17; 19:00	Anthony Breen, Stephen O'Gorman, Ian Carty 1-1 each, Seamus McLoughlin 0-4f, Chris Cullen, Eoin Doyle, Luke Sinnott 0-1 each	Report	Sean Nolan 1-2, David Shannon 1-1 (1-0 pen, 0-1f), PJ Banville 0-4 (0-2f), Declan Murphy 0-2, David Larkin and Leigh O'Brien 0-1 each	O'Kennedy Park; Referee: Barry Redmond (Clonard)

==== Round 5 ====
9/2/17; 18:00	St Martin's	3-12 – 0-5	Gusserane O'Rahillys	Wexford Park; Referee: Barry Redmond (Clonard)
9/2/17; 18:00	Ciaran Lyng 1-3 (0-1f), Jamie Carty 1-2 (0-1f), Jack O'Connor 1-0, Ryan Murphy 0-3, Barry O'Connor 0-2 (0-1f), Jake Firman and Daithi Waters 0-1 each	Report	Sean Ryan 0-4 and Kenneth Cahill 0-1	Wexford Park; Referee: Barry Redmond (Clonard)

9/2/17; 18:00	Horeswood	2-6 – 1-6	Fethard	O'Kennedy Park; Referee: Damien Donovan (Volunteers)
9/2/17; 18:00	Sean Nolan 1-1, Paddy Murphy 1-0, Declan Murphy 0-3f, David Larkin and Shane O'Hanlon (0-1f) 0-1 each		Joe Sutton 1-0, John Tubritt 0-2, Graham O'Grady, Daire Barden, Kevin Rowe, Ruairi Tubrid 0-1 each	O'Kennedy Park; Referee: Damien Donovan (Volunteers)

9/2/17; 18:00	St James'	1-12 – 2-6	Taghmon–Camross	Bellefield; Referee: John Carton (Monageer–Boolavogue)
9/2/17; 18:00	David Doyle 1-0, Matthew O'Hanlon and Jamie Myler (0-1f) 0-3 each, Mark Molloy and Kevin O'Grady 0-2 each, Paul Barron and Brian Molloy 0-1 each	Report	Michael O'Gorman 1-2, Stephen O'Gorman 1-0, Seamus McLoughlin 0-2f, Darren Carty and Ian Carty 0-1 each	Bellefield; Referee: John Carton (Monageer–Boolavogue)

== Knock-out stages ==
=== Relegation final ===
The bottom finisher from both groups qualify for the Relegation final. The loser will be relegated to the 2018 Intermediate Championship.

- Sarsfields 2-9, 1-8 Horeswood, Cushinstown, 15/9/2017,

=== Finals bracket ===
The top 4 teams from each group qualify for the quarter-finals with 1st -vs- 4th and 2nd -vs- 3rd in each case.

Quarter-Finals		Semi-Finals		Final
Starlights	1-14
St James'	0-10	Starlights	2-12
Castletown	3-15	Castletown	1-12
Taghmon–Camross	1-10			Starlights	0-17
Shelmaliers	1-12			St Martin's	1-8
Gusserane O'Rahillys	0-11	Shelmaliers	1-10 (2-4 R)
St Martin's	0-18	St Martin's	0-13 (1-14 R)
Glynn–Barntown	2-6

=== Quarter-finals ===
9/16/17; 14:00	Starlights	1-14 – 0-10	St James'	Wexford Park; Referee: Damien Donovan (Volunteers)
9/16/17; 14:00	Dillon Redmond 1-4 (1-0 pen, 0-3f), Alan Tobin 0-4 (0-2f), Darragh Pepper 0-3, Kevin Foley 0-2, Ryan Mahon 0-1	Report	Jamie Myler 0-6 (0-4f), Kevin O'Grady 0-2 (1 '45), David Doyle and Matthew O'Hanlon 0-1 each	Wexford Park; Referee: Damien Donovan (Volunteers)

9/16/17; 15:30	Shelmaliers	1-12 – 0-11	Gusserane O'Rahilly's	Wexford Park; Referee: Kevin Carty (Sarsfields)
9/16/17; 15:30	Eoghan Nolan 1-6 (0-2f), Glen Malone 0-2, Brian Murphy, Simon Donohoe, Paraic O'Leary, Craig McCabe 0-1 each	Report	Mark Rossiter 0-4 (0-1f), Shane Cullen (0-2f) and Sean Ryan 0-2 each, Jack Burford (0-1f), Adrian Redmond, Sam Wall 0-1 each	Wexford Park; Referee: Kevin Carty (Sarsfields)

9/16/17; 17:45	Castletown	3-15 – 1-10	Taghmon–Camross	Bellefield; Referee: Barry Redmond (Clonard)
9/16/17; 17:45	Andy Merrigan 1-2 (0-1f), Donnacha Holme 0-4, Robbie Brooks 1-1, Danny Gardiner 1-0, James Holmes, Jody O'Shaughnessy, Ben Brosnan (0-1f) 0-2 each, Conor Carty and Pierce Maxwell 0-1 each	Report	Seamus McLoughlin 1-3 (0-2f), Stephen O'Gorman 0-3, Ian Carty 0-2, Darren Carty and Barry O'Gorman 0-1 each	Bellefield; Referee: Barry Redmond (Clonard)

9/16/17; 19:15	St Martin's	0-18 – 2-6	Glynn–Barntown	Bellefield; Referee: Anthony Tobin (Geraldine O'Hanrahans)
9/16/17; 19:15	Barry O'Connor 0-7 (0-4f), Ciaran Lyng 0-6 (0-1f), Jamie Carty 0-2, Conor Firman, Jake Firman, Ryan Murphy 0-1 each	Report	Gary Delaney 2-1 (2-0 pen, 0-1f), Mark Fanning 0-3 (0-2f), Rioghan Crosbie and Craig Doyle 0-1 each	Bellefield; Referee: Anthony Tobin (Geraldine O'Hanrahans)

=== Semi-finals ===
10/1/17; 14:00	Starlights	2-12 – 1-12	Castletown	Wexford Park; Referee: Anthony Tobin (Geraldine O'Hanrahans)
10/1/17; 14:00		Report		Wexford Park; Referee: Anthony Tobin (Geraldine O'Hanrahans)

10/1/17; 15:30	Shelmaliers	1-10 – 0-13	St Martin's	Wexford Park; Referee: Barry Redmond (Clonard)

10/15/17; 15:45; Replay	St Martin's	1-14 – 2-4	Shelmaliers	Wexford Park; Referee: David Jenkins (Gusserane)
10/15/17; 15:45; Replay		Report		Wexford Park; Referee: David Jenkins (Gusserane)

== Final ==
29 October 2017; 3:00 pm	Starlights	0-17 – 1-8	St Martin's	Wexford Park; Referee: Barry Redmond (Clonard); Man of the Match: Liam Ryan
29 October 2017; 3:00 pm	Alan Tobin (0-1f) and Darragh Pepper 0-4 each, Dillon Redmond 0-3f, Rory O'Connor 0-2, Kevin Foley, Liam Ryan, Richard Farrell, Eamonn Furlong 0-1 each	Report	Ciaran Lyng 1-3 (0-3f), Jack O'Connor and Jake Firman 0-2 each, Rory O'Connor 0-1	Wexford Park; Referee: Barry Redmond (Clonard); Man of the Match: Liam Ryan
