= Wexford county hurling team =

Hurling team

Wexford
- Sport: Hurling
- Irish: Loch Garman
- Nickname(s): The Model men The Slaneysiders; The Yellowbellies; The Purple and Gold
- County board: Wexford GAA
- Manager: Keith Rossiter
- Home venue(s): Wexford Park, Wexford

Recent competitive record
- Current All-Ireland status: Leinster (5th in 2026)
- Last championship title: 1996
- Current NHL Division: 1B (3rd in 2026)
- Last league title: 1973
First colours	Second colours

The Wexford county hurling team represents Wexford in hurling and is governed by Wexford GAA, the county board of the Gaelic Athletic Association. The team competes in the three major annual inter-county competitions; the All-Ireland Senior Hurling Championship, the Leinster Senior Hurling Championship and the National Hurling League.

Wexford's home ground is Wexford Park, Wexford. The team's manager is Keith Rossiter.

The team last won the Leinster Senior Championship in 2019, the All-Ireland Senior Championship in 1996 and the National League in 1973.

The team is nicknamed the Model Men, the Slaneysiders, the Yellowbellies or the Purple and Gold.

== History ==
Hurling is one of the most prominent sports in Wexford. This is in evidence in several one-sided results over the years: Kildare were beaten by 14–15 to 1–1 in an 1897 Croke Cup match. The Antrim team were beaten by 12–17 to 2–3 in a 1954 All-Ireland semi-final. Nicky Rackard, who scored 7–7 at that day, was Wexford's greatest hurler. He starred in two clashes with Cork in 1954 and 1956. Wexford lost the first after having a goal disallowed, but won the second with the combination of an Art Foley save and Nicky Rackard goal in the closing minutes.

In the 1970s, the distinctive red-haired Tony Doran was the star as Kilkenny and Wexford played ten Leinster finals in succession. In 1984 they claimed that the final whistle was blown prematurely when they were beaten by a single point in the Leinster final.

In 1996 Wexford, led by Liam Griffin and captained by Martin Storey, brought the Liam MacCarthy Cup back to Slaneyside for the first time since 1968; they were waiting 28 years. Cork, Kilkenny and Tipperary have dominated the honours in recent years.

Wexford won a Leinster SHC title in 2004.

=== 2009 ===
In 2009, Wexford took part in Division 2 of the Allianz National Hurling League. After their shock defeat by Antrim, in which the Saffrons made a memorable comeback, Wexford improved to take a place in the division 2 final against Offaly. The yellowbellies were favourites, having beaten them earlier in the league, however Colm Bonnar's men did not perform on the day. It was a massive disappointment, meaning Wexford will be outside of hurling's top tier for the second year running. The Leinster championship arrived and Wexford had a chance for redemption with an opening round clash against Offaly. They gained revenge with Stephen Banville starring in a comfortable victory, with the aid of home advantage. Up next was Dublin and a younger more talented city side prevailed. This was followed up by defeat in the qualifiers against Limerick.

=== 2010 ===
In 2010, Wexford took part in Division 2 of the Allianz National Hurling League once again playing this time against Clare. The Model men were once again the favourites, having such a good league experience. Despite a disappointing performance Wexford still ran out winners at the end only to be promoted back to Division 1 of the Allianz National Hurling League after waiting three years. Wexford began the Leinster Championship 2010 with a defeat to Galway in Nowlan Park despite having a good second half.

=== 2011 ===
In 2011, Wexford took part in the Division 1 Allianz National Hurling League. Throughout the league campaign, it seemed the standard of The Model County was poor, but when it mattered in the last two games to stay up, they beat Offaly and Cork. They defeated Cork by 1–16 to 1–15 before drawing level with champions Tipperary. The championship began with the opening against Antrim which proved too easy for Wexford. The second game saw The Model County with home advantage against old rivals Kilkenny however it was Kilkenny's evening. Wexford exited in the qualifiers, for the second year in three, against Limerick which led to the resignation of Colm Bonnar as manager. He was replaced by Oulart the Ballagh manager Liam Dunne.

=== Dunne era: 2011–16 ===
In 2013, Wexford missed out promotion to Division 1A despite making progress. The Leinster Championship saw The 'Slaneysiders' take on Dublin at a very sunny soaked Wexford Park on Saturday 8 June with both sides starting very poorly despite Dublin racing into an early lead 0–4 to 0–1 before Wexford rallied back and brought the game level before Jack Guiney hit a rocket of a goal to restore the lead for the home side only for the Dubs to outscore with points from Joey Boland, Shane Durkan & Michael Carton. The 2nd half proved to be a real contest as Wexford looked like causing a real upset only for Eamon Dillion to score a late goal to secure Dublin's lead before a last minute free from Jack Guiney forced a replay with it ending 1–17 apiece. The replay took place in Parnell Park on 15 June which proved to be quite a disaster for Wexford as Andrew Shore was sent off after 5 minutes before Dublin rallied on to win 1–17 to 0–12 to advance to the Semi-final. Wexford had a good run through the qualifiers thrashing Antrim 3–18 to 0–17 before getting the better of Carlow 2–16 to 0–20 before eventually losing to eventual 'All Ireland Champions' Clare at a very sunny scorched Semple Stadium despite dragging the game to extra-time 3–24 to 1–20 the final result.

In 2014, Wexford advanced to the League Quarter Final only to lose to Leinster rivals Kilkenny. The Leinster opener saw Wexford trash Antrim 5–19 to 0–21 at O'Moore Park on 1 June to advance the semi-final only to lose to reigning Leinster champions Dublin. The run through the qualifiers proved to be a real surprise as they looked like dethroning the reigning All Ireland Champions Clare at Cusack Park on 5 July only to end in a draw despite going to extra-time ending 2–25 apiece. The replay took place the following week 12 July at Wexford Park with Clare looking like they were going through only Wexford rallying back to bring the match level & extra-time once again before Wexford eventually ran out winners 2–25 to 2–22. They played Munster rivals Waterford the following Saturday with Wexford getting a decent lead during the first with rocket of goals ending the match 3–15 to 2–15. The Quarter Final saw Munster finalists Limerick hammer a very exhausted Wexford side 4–26 to 1–11.

=== Fitzgerald era: 2016–21 ===
Davy Fitzgerald was appointed manager in 2016.

Davy Fitzgerald took over as manager of the team for 2017, and made progress by reaching the Leinster SHC final for the first time in nine years. In the final the team played Galway. Fitzgerald was appointed after the departure of Liam Dunne, who also played a huge part in their recent success. The team has lost only one game so far in 2017, which was in the Walsh Cup semi-final by a single point against Kilkenny. The team won promotion to Division 1A, went unbeaten in the Allianz League: Wexford defeated Limerick, Galway, Laois, Offaly and Kerry, and defeated Kilkenny at Nowlan Park on a scoreline of 2-18 0–19 in the NHL quarter-final. The team faced All-Ireland SHC winners Tipperary in the NHL semi-final, which the team lost after goals from Tipperary in the closing minutes. Recently the team beat Laois 3–25 to 1–19 in Portlaoise in the Leinster SHC quarter-final, and defeated Kilkenny at Innovate Wexford Park. This brought Wexford to Croke Park for the Leinster SHC final against Galway, but the team lost that game by a scoreline of 1–17 to 0–29, Galway going on to win the All-Ireland SHC that year. Wexford played Waterford at Páirc Uí Chaoimh in the All-Ireland SHC quarter final, but lost by three points.

Wexford's most recent hurling success was in the 2019 Leinster Senior Hurling Championship Final when the team defeated Kilkenny. In the Leinster SHC semi-final, a draw in Wexford Park between Wexford and Kilkenny made it a rematch for the final.

Wexford won the 2019 Leinster Senior Hurling Championship.

Wexford then lost the all Ireland Senior hurling semi-final against Tipperary.

Fitzgerald resigned after Wexford's 2021 season ended.

== Crest and colours ==
Classic kit

Wexford sporting colours are purple and gold. This iconic choice was made in 1913 before using the colours of county champions clubs Disposal of the colours is changed during the year, being the traditional kit mostly gold with a purple horizontal half. Since the 1990s purple has gained more importance and has been used in sleeves and with gradients. The current kit is mainly purple with golden trims.

The crest has been changed several times. Until 1996, the team used Wexford Town's traditional crest (three burning wooden ships) then they adopted the new county's coat of arms. Since 2006, Wexford GAA launched their own logo, used also on the jerseys.

=== Team sponsorship ===
Zurich Insurance Group sponsored the team on a four-year deal from 2020, following an announcement in October 2019.

== Panel ==
Team as per Wexford vs Clare in the All-Ireland SHC qualifier, 14 November 2020

No.	Player	Position	Club
1	Mark Fanning	Goalkeeper	Glynn–Barntown
2	Simon Donohoe	Right corner-back	Shelmaliers
3	Liam Ryan	Full-back	Rapparees
4	Joe O'Connor	Left corner-back	St Martin's
5	Paudie Foley^{WD}	Right half-back	Crossabeg Ballymurn
6	Matthew O'Hanlon (j.c.)	Centre-back	St James'
7	Shaun Murphy	Left half-back	Oulart–The Ballagh
8	Diarmuid O'Keeffe	Midfield	St Anne's
9	Lee Chin (j.c.)	Midfield	Faythe Harriers
10	Liam Óg McGovern	Right half-forward	St Anne's
11	Rory O'Connor	Centre-forward	St Martin's
12	Aidan Nolan	Left half-forward	Halfway House Bunclody
13	Kevin Foley	Right corner-forward	Rapparees
14	Conor McDonald	Full-forward	Naomh Éanna
15	Paul Morris^{RET}	Left corner-forward	Ferns St Aidan's

No.	Player	Position	Club
16	James Lawlor	Substitute	Ferns St Aidan's
17	Damien Reck	Substitute	Oylegate–Glenbrien
18	Shane Reck	Substitute	Oylegate–Glenbrien
19	Gavin Bailey	Substitute	Ferns St Aidan's
20	Conal Flood	Substitute	Cloughbawn
21	David Dunne	Substitute	Davidstown–Courtnacuddy
22	Mikie Dwyer	Substitute	Fethard St Mogues
23	Jack O'Connor	Substitute	St Martin's
24	Ian Byrne	Substitute	Ferns St Aidan's
25	Harry Kehoe	Substitute	Cloughbawn
26	Cathal Dunbar	Substitute	Naomh Éanna

^{INJ} Player has had an injury which has affected recent involvement with the county team.
^{RET} Player has since retired from the county team.
^{WD} Player has since withdrawn from the county team due to a non-injury issue.

== Management team ==
Appointed August 2023:

- Manager: Keith Rossiter
- Lead coach: David Franks
- Assistant coach: Éanna Martin
- Goalkeeping coach: Damien Fitzhenry
- Skills coach: Frank Flannery

== Managerial history ==
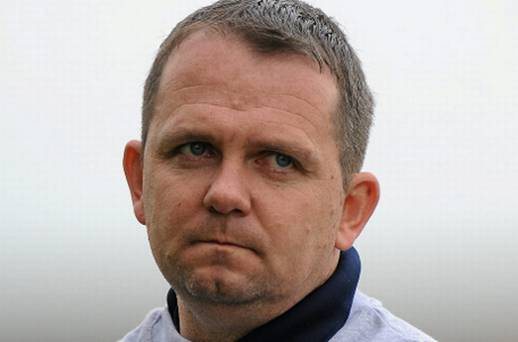
Davy Fitzgerald managed Wexford to a first Leinster Senior Hurling Championship title for fifteen years in 2019.

Mick Kinsella 1981–1983

Christy Keogh 1983–1984

Christy Keogh 1984–?

Oliver McGrath 1987–1989

Martin Quigley 1989–1992

Christy Keogh (2) 1992–1994

Liam Griffin 1994–1996

Rory Kinsella 1996–1999

Joachim Kelly 1999–2000

Tony Dempsey 2000–2002

John Conran 2002–2004

Séamus Murphy 2004–2006

John Meyler 2006–2008

Colm Bonnar 2008–2011

Liam Dunne 2011–2016

Davy Fitzgerald 2016–2021

Darragh Egan 2021–2023

Keith Rossiter 2023–

== Players ==
=== Notable players ===
- Damien Fitzhenry
- Conor McDonald: 100 appearances

== Honours ==
=== National ===
- All-Ireland Senior Hurling Championship
  - (gold) Winners (6): 1910, 1955, 1956, 1960, 1968, 1996
  - (silver) Runners-up (11): 1890, 1891, 1899, 1918, 1951, 1954, 1962, 1965, 1970, 1976, 1977
- National Hurling League
  - (gold) Winners (4): 1955–56, 1957–58, 1966–67, 1972–73
  - (silver) Runners-up (10): 1950–51, 1951–52, 1954–55, 1963–64, 1968–69, 1981–82, 1983–84, 1989–90, 1990–91, 1992–93
- National Hurling League Div 2
  - (gold) Winners (1): 2010
- All-Ireland Intermediate Hurling Championship
  - (gold) Winners (4): 1961, 1968, 2005, 2007
- All-Ireland Junior Hurling Championship
  - (gold) Winners (2): 1985, 1992
- All-Ireland Under-21 Hurling Championship
  - (gold) Winners (1): 1965
- All-Ireland Minor Hurling Championship
  - (gold) Winners (3): 1963, 1966, 1968

=== Provincial ===
- Leinster Senior Hurling Championship
  - (gold) Winners (21): 1890, 1891, 1899, 1901, 1910, 1918, 1951, 1954, 1955, 1956, 1960, 1962, 1965, 1968, 1970, 1976, 1977, 1996, 1997, 2004, 2019
  - (silver) Runners-up (32): 1897, 1916, 1944, 1950, 1952, 1953, 1957, 1958, 1961, 1966, 1967, 1971, 1972, 1973, 1974, 1975, 1978, 1979, 1981, 1984, 1988, 1992, 1993, 1994, 2001, 2002, 2003, 2005, 2006, 2007, 2008, 2017
- Walsh Cup
  - (gold) Winners (17): 1954, 1956, 1965, 1967, 1968, 1969, 1987, 1995, 1996, 1997, 1998, 1999. 2000, 2001, 2002, 2018, 2024
- Kehoe Cup
  - (gold) Winners (1): 1977
- Leinster Intermediate Hurling
  - (gold) Winners (9): 1961, 1963, 1964, 1965, 2001, 2002, 2005, 2007, 2014
- Leinster Junior Hurling Championship
  - (gold) Winners (7): 1926, 1940, 1957, 1959, 1985, 1987, 1992
- Leinster Under-21 Hurling Championship
  - (gold) Winners (17): 1964, 1965, 1966, 1969, 1970, 1971, 1973, 1979, 1986, 1987, 1996, 1997, 2001, 2002, 2013, 2014, 2015
- Leinster Minor Hurling Championship
  - (gold) Winners (8): 1963, 1966, 1967, 1968, 1970, 1980, 1985, 2019
