= George O'Connor (hurler) =

Irish hurler and Gaelic footballer

Personal information
- Native name: Seoirse Ó Conchubhair (Irish)
- Nickname: Georgie
- Born: 1959 (age 66–67) Piercestown, County Wexford, Ireland
- Occupation: Farmer

Sport
- Sport: Hurling
- Position: Midfield
Club
- Years: Club
- St Martin's
Inter-county
Years	County	Apps (scores)
1979-1996	Wexford	32 (2-30)
Inter-county titles
- Leinster titles: 1
- All-Irelands: 1
- NHL: 0
- All Stars: 2

George O'Connor (born 1959 in Piercestown, County Wexford) is an Irish former sportsperson. He played hurling with his local club St Martin's and with the Wexford senior inter-county team from 1979 until 1996. In 2002, a six-person panel included O'Connor within a list representing the "greatest Wexford hurling team".

== Early life ==
George O'Connor was born in Piercestown, County Wexford in 1959. The second eldest in a sporting family of four boys, he has born into a hurling household. His father, Paddy O’Connor, was a midfielder on the Wexford junior hurling team that won the Leinster Junior Hurling Championship in 1940. O'Connor grew up on the family farm and in time would become a farmer himself.

== Playing career ==
=== Club ===
O'Connor played his underage and club hurling and football with his local St Martin's club. The club won the county minor hurling championship in 1974, with O'Connor sharing in the success as a fourteen-year-old substitute. By the time the three-in-a-row at minor level was completed in 1976, O'Connor had become a regular fixture on the team. He was also a figure at midfield in 1977 as St Martin's captured the intermediate hurling championship. This victory allowed the club to advance to the senior grade; however, despite reaching the final four on a number of occasions throughout the 1980s, O'Connor's side failed to win the competition.

On the football fields O'Connor helped St Martin's to win the intermediate championship in 1982.

=== Inter-county ===
O'Connor first came to prominence on the inter-county scene as a member of the Wexford minor hurling team in the late 1970s. He captained the team to the 1977 Leinster final, however, Wexford were denied victory on that occasion. In his final year as a minor O'Connor also played in the Leinster football final, however, Dublin denied Wexford. In 1979 he captured a Leinster under-21 title as Wexford surprisingly defeated Kilkenny. The team were later beaten by Galway in the All-Ireland semi-final.

O'Connor was selected for the senior panel and made his senior debut in the 1979 Oireachtas final. Wexford defeated Offaly on that occasion. Two years later in 1981, O'Connor was one of the stars of the team, and he was presented with an All-Star award. In 1983, O'Connor had success on the football field as Wexford defeated Clare to win the Division 3 final of the National Football League. Over the next decade or so, Wexford appeared in five Leinster hurling finals, however, the team were defeated on every occasion. Similarly, the National League final of 1993 saw Wexford battle it out with Cork in a three-game saga that eventually resulted in defeat for the Wexford men.

The following year, Wexford crashed out of the provincial championship once again and O'Connor contemplated retirement. New manager Liam Griffin persuaded him to stay on.

In 1996, O'Connor suffered a hand injury in the provincial semi-final against Dublin. However, he made a cameo appearance in the final as he collected his first Leinster title. It was Wexford's first provincial title since 1977. The subsequent All-Ireland final saw Wexford take on Limerick, the defeated finalists of 1994. O'Connor started at midfield for that game in which a fourteen-man Wexford side won and O'Connor received an All-Ireland Senior Hurling Championship medal.

After seventeen seasons in the Wexford jersey, O'Connor subsequently retired from inter-county hurling.
