= 2018 Walsh Cup =

Tournament details
- Province: Leinster
- Year: 2018
- Sponsor: Bord na Móna

Winners
- Champions: Wexford (16th win)
- Manager: Davy Fitzgerald
- Captain: Lee Chin and Matthew O'Hanlon

Runners-up
- Runners-up: Kilkenny
- Manager: Brian Cody
- Captain: Cillian Buckley

Other
- Matches played: 14

The 2018 Walsh Cup was an inter-county hurling competition based mainly in the Irish province of Leinster. It took place between December 2017 and January 2018.

For the first time, no third-level college teams took part. 10 Leinster counties, plus Antrim, competed. Longford and Louth entered the second-ranked Kehoe Cup.

Wexford were the 2018 champions, beating Kilkenny 3–2 in a free-taking competition after the final ended level on 1-24 each after extra time. This was the first inter-county hurling game to be decided by the taking of frees.

== Format ==
There are 11 teams, in three groups of 3 teams and one group of 2 teams. In the three-team groups, each team plays the other teams once. In the two-team group, the teams play each other twice. Two points are awarded for a win and one for a draw.

The four group winners advance to the semi-finals.

== Group stage ==
=== Group 1 ===
Team	Pld	W	D	L	Pts	Diff
Wexford	2	2	0	0	4	+44
Carlow	2	1	0	1	2	+9
Wicklow	2	0	0	2	0	–53

=== Group 2 ===
Team	Pld	W	D	L	Pts	Diff
Kilkenny	2	2	0	0	4	+47
Laois	2	1	0	1	2	–18
Kildare	2	0	0	2	0	–29

=== Group 3 ===
Team	Pld	W	D	L	Pts	Diff
Dublin	2	2	0	0	4	+27
Meath	2	1	0	1	2	-15
Antrim	2	0	0	2	0	–12

=== Group 4 ===
Team	Pld	W	D	L	Pts	Diff
Offaly	2	2	0	0	4	+5
Westmeath	2	0	0	2	0	–5

== Knock-out stage ==
=== Semi-finals ===
13 January 2018
2 p.m.
Semi-final

Offaly	3-11 – 1-20	Kilkenny
Shane Kinsella 1-3, Shane Dooley 1-1 (1-0 pen, 0-1f), Eoin Cahill 0-3 (0-3f), Conor Mahon 1-0, Thomas Geraghty 0-2, Oisin Kelly (0-1f), Liam Langton 0-1 each.	Report	Alan Murphy 0-7 (0-6f), Richie Reid 0-5, Richie Leahy 0-3, Ger Malone 1-0, John Donnelly 0-2, John Walsh, Bill Sheehan and Conor Martin 0-1 each.

O'Connor Park, Tullamore
Referee: Gearóid McGrath (Dublin)
14 January 2018
2 p.m.
Semi-final

Dublin	0-16 – 1-20	Wexford
Paul Winters 0-6 (5f), Donal Burke 0-4 (4f), Fergal Whitely 0-3, Cian McBride, Johnny McCaffrey and Danny Sutcliffe 0-1 each.	Report	Paul Morris 0-6 (4f), Cathal Dunbar 1-1, Paudie Foley (0-1f, 0-1 65), Kevin Foley and Jack Guiney 0-3 each, Conor McDonald and David Dunne 0-2 each, Harry Kehoe 0-1.

Parnell Park, Donnycarney
Referee: Gavin Quilty (Kilkenny)

=== Final ===
20 January 2018
2 p.m. GMT
Final

Report

Kilkenny	1-24 (27) – (27) 1-24 (a.e.t.) (2–3 fk)	Wexford
Gls: Alan Murphy 1pen Pts: Alan Murphy 13 (6fs, 1 '65'), Ollie Walsh 2, Walter Walsh 2, Martin Keoghan 2, Eoin Murphy 2fs, Conor Fogarty 1, Richie Reid 1, Conor Martin 1		Gls: Kevin Foley 1 Pts: Paul Morris 9 (7fs), Jack Guiney 5 (3fs), Harry Kehoe 3, Mark Fanning 1f, Eoin Moore 1, Cathal Dunbar 1, David Dunne 1, Jack O'Connor 1, Lee Chin 1, Conor McDonald 1
Free-taking competition
Eoin Murphy (penalty scored); Conor Martin (penalty scored); Lester Ryan (penalty missed); Alan Murphy (penalty missed); John Walsh (penalty missed)		(penalty missed) Paul Morris; (penalty missed) Lee Chin; (penalty scored) Conor McDonald; (penalty scored) Jack Guiney; (penalty scored) Mark Fanning

Nowlan Park, Kilkenny
Referee: John O'Brien (Laois)
Attendance: 3,554
