= 2015 All-Ireland Under-21 Hurling Championship final =

2015 All-Ireland Under-21 Hurling Championship Final
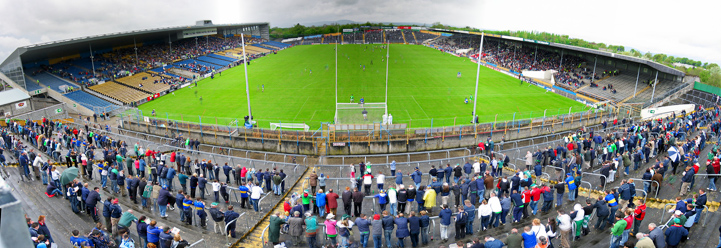
- Event: 2015 All-Ireland Under-21 Hurling Championship
Wexford	Limerick
1-7	0-26
- Date: 12 September 2015
- Venue: Semple Stadium, Thurles
- Man of the Match: Barry Nash
- Referee: Johnny Ryan (Tipperary)
- Attendance: 18,544
- Weather: Dry, intermittent clouds

The 2015 All-Ireland Under-21 Hurling Championship final was a hurling match that was played at Semple Stadium, Thurles on 12 September 2015 to determine the winners of the 2015 All-Ireland Under-21 Hurling Championship, the 52nd season of the All-Ireland Under-21 Hurling Championship, a tournament organised by the Gaelic Athletic Association for the champion teams of the four provinces of Ireland. The final was contested by Wexford of Leinster and Limerick of Munster.

Limerick won the game by 0-26 to 1-7.

The homecoming event for the winning Limerick team took place on 17 September in front of Limerick City and County Council’s corporate headquarters at Merchants Quay. The homecoming was postponed from its original date of 14 September due to the bad weather.

== Background ==
Wexford last won the competition in 1965, which was also their only title. Limerick have won on four occasion, in 1987, 2000, 2001 and 2002.

The Cross of Cashel winners trophy which was first introduced in 1967, will be awarded to the winning captain for the last time before being replaced with a new trophy for the following year.

== Television coverage ==
The All-Ireland final was broadcast live as part of GAA Beo on TG4. Mícheál Ó Domhnaill presented the programme with analysis from John Allen and Diarmuid Lyng. Brian Tyers was the lead commentator with Pat Fleury acting as co-commentator.

== Match ==
=== Team News ===
Limerick announced an unchanged team from the semi-final win against Galway for the final. Wexford also announced and unchanged side for the final.

=== Details ===
12 September 2015
19:00

Wexford	1-7 - 0-26	Limerick
C McDonald 1-4 (0-3fs, 0-1 sl), P Foley (f), C Dunbar, A Kenny all 0-1 each	Report	R Lynch 0-6 (5fs), B Nash 0-5, T Morrissey 0-4, P Ryan, C Lynch, P Casey (0-1 pen) 0-3 each, D Byrnes (1f) 0-2.

Semple Stadium, Thurles
Attendance: 18,544
Referee: J Ryan (Tipperary)

Wexford	Limerick
