= 2017 Leinster Senior Hurling Championship final =

2017 Leinster Senior Hurling final
- Event: 2017 Leinster Senior Hurling Championship
Wexford	Galway
1-17	0-29
- Date: 2 July 2017
- Venue: Croke Park, Dublin
- Man of the Match: Conor Cooney
- Referee: Colm Lyons ( Cork)
- Attendance: 60,032
- Weather: Dry and Sunny

The 2017 Leinster Senior Hurling Championship final, the deciding game of the 2017 Leinster Senior Hurling Championship, was a hurling match which was played on 2 July 2017 at Croke Park, Dublin. It was contested by Wexford and Galway, the first ever Leinster final between the two counties.

Galway captained by David Burke won the game on a 0–29 to 1–17 scoreline to secure their second Leinster title, they had a 0–14 to 0–11 lead at half-time. Due to a clash of colours, Galway wore an all white kit with Wexford wearing yellow jerseys and purple shorts.

== Build-Up ==
Wexford were playing in their first Leinster final since 2008 and were looking for their first win since 2004. Galway were playing in their sixth final with one win in 2012.

The match was shown live on RTÉ Two as part of The Sunday Game Live with commentary from Marty Morrissey and Michael Duignan. The attendance of 60,032 was a record attendance for a Leinster hurling final.

== Match details ==
2 July 2017
16:00
Final

Wexford	1-17 - 0-29	Galway
Diarmuid O’Keeffe 1-1, Conor McDonald 0-6 (0-3f), Lee Chin 0-4 (0-2f, 0-1 65), Paul Morris and Matthew O’Hanlon 0-2 each, Willie Devereux, Jack O’Connor and Cathal Dunbar 0-1 each.	Report	Joe Canning 0-10 (0-8f, 0-1 65, 0-1 sideline), Conor Cooney 0-8 (0-1f), Joseph Cooney 0-5, Niall Burke 0-2, David Burke, Padraic Mannion, Thomas Monaghan and Shane Maloney 0-1 each

Croke Park, Dublin
Attendance: 60, 032
Referee: Colm Lyons (Cork)
