= 2019 Leinster Senior Hurling Championship final =

2019 Leinster Senior Hurling final
- Event: 2019 Leinster Senior Hurling Championship
Wexford	Kilkenny
1-23	0-23
- Date: 30 June 2019
- Venue: Croke Park, Dublin
- Man of the Match: Rory O'Connor
- Referee: John Keenan (Wicklow)
- Attendance: 51,482
- Weather: Sunny

The 2019 Leinster Senior Hurling Championship final, the deciding game of the 2019 Leinster Senior Hurling Championship, was a hurling match that was played on 30 June 2019 at Croke Park, Dublin. It was contested by Kilkenny and Wexford.

Wexford managed by Davy Fitzgerald and captained by Lee Chin and Matthew O'Hanlon won the game by 1-23 to 0-23 to win their first Leinster title since 2004.

It was their first Leinster title win since 2004.

== Build-Up ==
Tickets for the final ranged in price from €35 to €40 in the stand and €25 in hill 16. The match was shown live on RTÉ One as part of The Sunday Game Live presented by Joanne Cantwell with analysis by Anthony Daly, Donal Óg Cusack and Henry Shefflin.

The final of the 2019 Joe McDonagh Cup took place before the final with Laois defeating Westmeath by 3-26 to 1-21.

== Details ==
RTE

30 June 2019
16:00
Final

Report

Wexford	1-23 – 0-23	Kilkenny
Gls: M Fanning 1 Pts: L Chin 9 (7f, 1 65), C McDonald 4 1, R O’Connor 4, D O’Keeffe 2, S Donohoe 1, P Morris 1, L Og McGovern 1, M Fanning 1, J O’Connor 1		Pts: TJ Reid 12 (7f, 1 65), A Mullen 3, W Walsh 2, C Fennelly 2, A Murphy 1, J Maher 1, E Murphy 1, G Aylward 1

Croke Park, Dublin
Referee: John Keenan (Wicklow)
Attendance: 51,482
