= Paul Murphy (hurler) =

Irish hurler

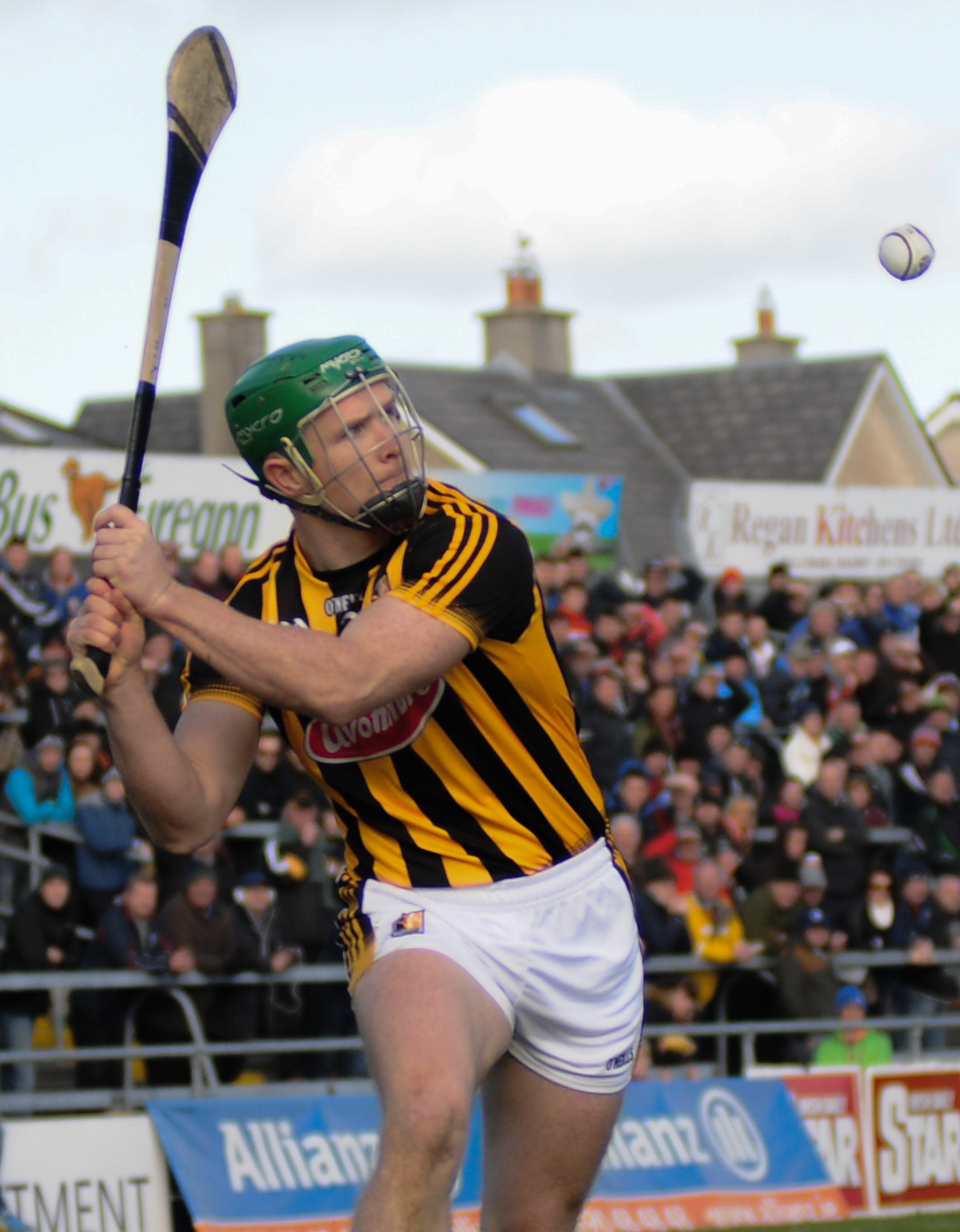
- Murphy playing for Kilkenny in 2015

Personal information
- Native name: Pól Ó Murchú (Irish)
- Born: 27 January 1989 (age 37) Danesfort, County Kilkenny, Ireland
- Occupation: Soldier
- Height: 5 ft 11 in (180 cm)

Sport
- Sport: Hurling
- Position: Right Corner Back
Club
- Years: Club
- 2006–: Danesfort
Club titles
- Kilkenny titles: 0
Inter-county*
Years	County	Apps (scores)
2009–2020	Kilkenny	49 (0-05)
Inter-county titles
- Leinster titles: 5
- All-Irelands: 4
- NHL: 3
- All Stars: 4
- *Inter County team apps and scores correct as of 15:41, 15 January 2021.

Paul Murphy (born 27 January 1989) is an Irish hurler who plays for Intermediate Championship club Danesfort. He is a former player with the Kilkenny senior hurling team, with whom he made 94 league and championship appearances in a decade-long inter-county career. Widely considered to be one of the best defenders of his generation, Murphy was the recipient of four All-Stars.

Murphy first played for Kilkenny when he joined the minor team at the age of 17. A three-year stint with the under-21 team yielded an All-Ireland Under-21 Championship title, while he enjoyed similar success with the intermediate team before being drafted onto the senior team as right corner-back in 2011. It was a position he retained for the rest of the decade. Murphy won his four All-Ireland Championship titles during his first five years on the team, with his performances during his second season earning him a Hurler of the Year nomination. His other major honours include five Leinster Championship titles and three successive National League titles.

Murphy's adult club career began with Danesfort in 2006, a season which culminated with the club winning the All-Ireland Junior Club Championship. Equally adept as a Gaelic footballer, he also enjoyed club championship success in that code. With the Leinster inter-provincial team, Murphy won two Interprovincial Championship titles.

== Playing career ==
=== Danesfort ===
Murphy joined the Danesfort club at a young age and played in all grades at juvenile and underage levels before eventually joining the club's top adult team in the Kilkenny Junior Championship.

On 29 October 2006, Murphy was just 17-years-old when he lined out at midfield in the Kilkenny Junior Championship final. He scored a point from play in the 2–12 to 2–11 defeat of Tullogher-Rosbercon. On 10 December 2006, Murphy won a Leinster Championship medal following a 4–11 to 1–05 defeat of Knockbridge in the final. He was switched to right wing-forward when Danesfort faced Clooney Gaels in the All-Ireland final on 11 March 2007. Murphy ended the game with a winners' medal after scoring two points in the 2–16 to 2–08 victory.

On 16 October 2011, Murphy lined out at left wing-back when Danesfort faced Rower-Inistioge in the Kilkenny Intermediate Championship final. He ended the game with a winners' medal following a 2–11 to 0–11 victory.

=== Kilkenny ===
==== Minor and under-21 ====
Murphy first played for Kilkenny as a member of the minor team during the 2006 Leinster Championship. On 2 July 2006, he won a Leinster Championship medal from right wing-back following Kilkenny's 4–22 to 1–05 defeat of Carlow in the final.

Murphy was again eligible for the minor grade in 2007 and became the first-choice centre-back. On 1 July 2007, he scored a goal from centre-back in Kilkenny's 2–14 to 1–10 defeat by Dublin in the Leinster final.

Murphy was drafted onto the Kilkenny under-21 team for the 2008 Leinster Championship. He made his first appearance for the team on 26 June 2008 when he lined out at right corner-back in a 1–20 to 1–11 defeat by Dublin. On 24 July 2008, Murphy claimed a Leinster Championship medal following a 2–21 to 2–09 defeat of Offaly in the final. He retained his position at right corner-back for the All-Ireland final against Tipperary on 14 September 2008 and ended the game with a winners' medal after a 2–13 to 0–15 victory.

On 15 July 2009, Murphy won a second successive Leinster Championship medal after lining out at right corner-back in the 2–20 to 1–19 defeat of Dublin in the final. He retained his position for the All-Ireland final against Clare on 13 September 2009. Murphy ended the game on the losing side following a 0–15 to 0–14 defeat.

Murphy was again eligible for the under-21 grade in 2010. He played his last game in the grade on 23 June 2010 when he scored two points from midfield in an 0–18 to 0–12 defeat by Dublin.

==== Intermediate ====
Murphy was added to the Kilkenny intermediate team for the 2010 Leinster Championship. He made his first appearance for the team on 16 June 2010 when he lined out at full-back in a 2–16 to 0–13 defeat of Wexford. On 7 July 2010, Murphy won a leinster Championship medal following a 1–21 to 0–11 defeat of Dublin in the final. He was again selected at full-back when Kilkenny qualified to play Cork in the All-Ireland final. Murphy ended the game with a winners' medal following the 2–17 to 1–13 victory.

On 28 June 2012, Murphy won a second Leinster Championship medal following a 3–20 to 2–14 defeat of Wexford in the final. On 1 September 2012, he lined out at midfield when Kilkenny suffered a 2–17 to 3–13 defeat by Tipperary in the All-Ireland final.

==== Senior ====
Murphy was added to the Kilkenny senior team for the pre-season Walsh Cup. He made his first appearance for the team on 18 January 2009 when he came on as a substitute for Tommy Walsh in a 6–12 to 0–12 defeat of Dublin. Murphy later failed to make the panel for the National League.

Murphy was recalled to the Kilkenny senior team in advance of the 2011 National League. He made his first appearance for the team on 6 March 2011 when lined out at left wing-back in a 2–16 to 0–17 defeat of Wexford. Murphy made his Leinster Championship debut on 11 June 2011 when he lined out at right corner-back in a 1–26 to 1–15 defeat of Wexford. On 3 July 2011, he won a Leinster Championship medal from left wing-back following Kilkenny's 4–17 to 1–15 defeat of Dublin in the final. Murphy was switched to right corner-back for the All-Ireland final against Tipperary on 4 September 2011. He ended the game with a winners' medal following the 2–17 to 1–16 victory. Murphy ended the season by being named in the right corner-back position on the All-Star team.

On 6 May 2012, Murphy won a National League medal when he lined out at right corner-back in Kilkenny's 3–21 to 0–16 defeat of Cork in the final. He was again at right corner-back on 8 July 2012 when Kilkenny suffered a 2–21 to 2–11 defeat by Galway in the Leinster final. On 9 September 2012, Murphy was at right corner-back when Kilkenny drew 2–13 to 0–19 with Galway in the All-Ireland final. He retained his position for the replay on 30 September 2012 and claimed a second successive winners' medal following Kilkenny's 3–22 to 3–11 victory. Murphy ended the season by winning a second successive All-Star award.

On 5 May 2013, Murphy lined out at right corner-back when Kilkenny faced Tipperary in the National League final. He ended the game with a second successive winners' medal following the 2–17 to 0–20 victory.

On 4 May 2014, Murphy was selected right corner-back when Kilkenny faced Tipperary in a second successive National League final. He ended the game with a third successive winners' medal following the 2–25 to 1–27 victory. On 6 July 2014, Murphy won a second Leinster Championship medal following a 0–24 to 1–09 defeat of Dublin in the Leinster final. On 7 September 2014, he was at right corner-back when Kilkenny drew 3–22 to 1–28 with Tipperary in the All-Ireland final. He retained his position for the replay on 27 September 2014 and ended the game with a third All-Ireland medal following the 2–17 to 2–14 victory. Murphy ended the season by receiving his third All-Star award.

Murphy won his third Leinster Championship medal on 5 July 2015 following Kilkenny's 1–25 to 2–15 defeat of Galway in the Leinster final. On 6 September 2015, he was again at right corner-back for the All-Ireland final against Galway. Murphy ended the game with a fourth All-Ireland medal in five seasons following the 1–22 to 1–18 victory. He ended the season by winning a fourth All-Star award.

Murphy won a fourth Leinster Championship medal on 3 July 2016 following a 1–26 to 0–22 defeat of Galway in the final. He was again at right corner-back for the All-Ireland final against Tipperary on 4 September 2016. Murphy ended the game on the losing side following a 2–29 to 2–20 defeat.

On 1 July 2018, Murphy lined out at right corner-back in an 0-18 apiece draw with Galway in the Leinster final on 1 July 2018. He retained his position for the replay a week later, however, Kilkenny suffered a 1–28 to 3–15 defeat.

On 30 June 2019, Murphy was selected at right corner-back when Kilkenny qualified to play Wexford in the Leinster final. He ended the game on the losing side following a 1–23 to 0–23 defeat.

On 15 January 2021, Murphy announced his retirement from inter-county hurling.

=== Football ===
Having retired from the Kilkenny hurling team Murphy had a surprise return to the final county game with the counties football team. He was part of the team who won the 2022 All-Ireland Junior Football Championship when they overcame New York in the final.

=== Leinster ===
Murphy was added to the Leinster team for the 2012 Inter-provincial Championship. He made his first appearance for the team on 19 February 2012 when he lined out at right corner-back in a 3–14 to 1–16 defeat of Munster. On 4 March 2012, Murphy won a Railway Cup medal following a 2–19 to 1–15 defeat of Connacht.

Murphy was included on the Leinster team for a second successive year in 2013. He made his only appearance of the year on 17 February 2013 when he lined out at right corner-back in a 3–13 to 1–16 defeat by Connacht.

On 1 March 2014, Murphy lined out at right corner-back when Leinster faced Connacht in the Railway Cup final. He ended the game with a second winners' medal following the 1–23 to 0–16 victory.

== Career statistics ==
Team	Year	National League			Leinster		All-Ireland		Total	
Team	Year	Division	Apps	Score	Apps	Score	Apps	Score	Apps	Score
Kilkenny	2011	Division 1A	5	0-00	2	0-01	2	0-00	9	0-01
Kilkenny	2012	Division 1A	7	0-00	2	0-00	4	0-00	13	0-00
Kilkenny	2013	Division 1A	5	0-00	2	0-00	3	0-01	10	0-01
Kilkenny	2014	Division 1A	7	0-00	4	0-01	3	0-01	14	0-02
Kilkenny	2015	Division 1A	6	0-00	2	0-00	2	0-00	10	0-00
Kilkenny	2016	Division 1A	4	0-00	2	0-00	3	0-00	9	0-00
Kilkenny	2017	Division 1A	6	0-00	1	0-00	2	0-00	9	0-00
Kilkenny	2018	Division 1A	0	0-00	6	0-00	1	0-00	7	0-00
Kilkenny	2019	Division 1A	5	0-00	5	0-01	3	0-00	13	0-01
Kilkenny	2020	Division 1B	0	0-00	0	0-00	0	0-00	0	0-00
Total			45	0-00	26	0-03	23	0-02	94	0-05

== Honours ==
Danesfort

- Kilkenny Intermediate Football Championship: 2015
- Kilkenny Intermediate Hurling Championship: 2011
- All-Ireland Junior Club Hurling Championship: 2007
- Leinster Junior Club Hurling Championship: 2007
- Kilkenny Junior Hurling Championship: 2006

Kilkenny

- All-Ireland Senior Hurling Championship: 2011, 2012, 2014, 2015
- Leinster Senior Hurling Championship: 2011, 2014, 2015, 2016, 2020
- National Hurling League: 2012, 2013, 2014
- Walsh Cup: 2009, 2012, 2014, 2017
- All-Ireland Intermediate Hurling Championship: 2010
- Leinster Intermediate Hurling Championship: 2010
- All-Ireland Junior Football Championship: 2022
- All-Ireland Under-21 Hurling Championship: 2008
- Leinster Under-21 Hurling Championship: 2008, 2009
- Leinster Minor Hurling Championship: 2006
- All-Ireland Junior Football Championship: 2022

Leinster

- Interprovincial Championship: 2012, 2014

Individual

- All-Stars: 2011, 2012, 2014, 2015
