= Cillian Buckley =

Kilkenny hurler (born 1992)

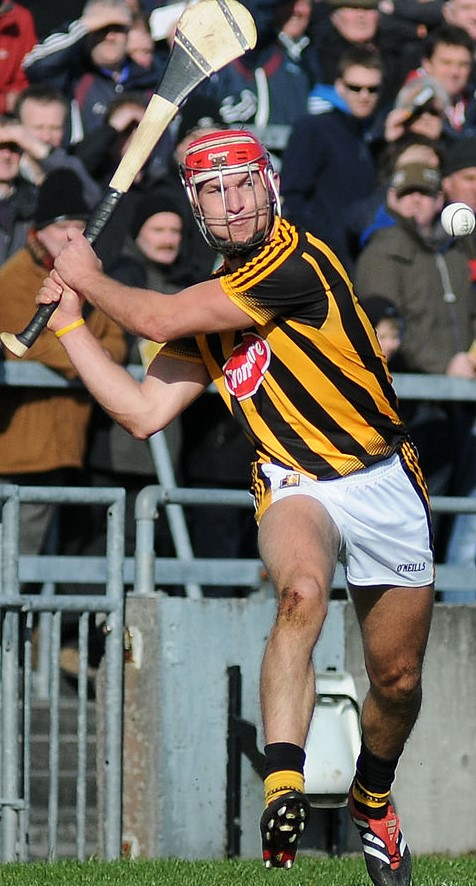

Personal information
- Native name: Cillian Ó Buachalla (Irish)
- Born: 14 July 1992 (age 34) Kilkenny, Ireland
- Occupation: Biomedical engineer
- Height: 6 ft 0 in (183 cm)

Sport
- Sport: Hurling
- Position: Left wing-back
Club
- Years: Club
- 2010–: Dicksboro
Club titles
- Kilkenny titles: 1
College
- Years: College
- 2011–2015: University College Dublin
College titles
- Fitzgibbon titles: 0
Inter-county*
Years	County	Apps (scores)
2012–2024	Kilkenny	56 (1–11)
Inter-county titles
- Leinster titles: 8
- All-Irelands: 3
- NHL: 5
- All Stars: 2
- *Inter County team apps and scores correct as of 23:35, 7 August 2024.

Cillian Buckley (born 14 July 1992) is an Irish hurler. At club level he plays with Dicksboro, while he is a former member of the Kilkenny senior hurling team.

== Playing career ==
=== St Kieran's College ===
During his schooling at St Kieran's College in Kilkenny, Buckley established himself as a key member of the senior hurling team. In 2010 he won his first Leinster medal following a 3–13 to 1–11 defeat of Dublin Colleges. On 3 April 2010, St Kieran's faced Ardscoil Rís in the All-Ireland decider. Buckley's side trailed by five points as the game entered the final quarter; however, St Kieran's staged a magnificent comeback, hitting 1–5 without reply, including a Michael Brennan goal in the 51st minute, to claim a 2–11 to 2–8 victory. It was Buckley's first All-Ireland medal.

Buckley added a second successive Leinster medal to his collection in 2011, as St Kieran's recorded a 3–7 to 0–7 victory over Castlecomer Community School. On 2 April 2011, St Kieran's renewed their rivalry with Ardscoil Rís in the All-Ireland final. A Thomas O'Hanrahan goal deep into stoppage time secured a 2–10 to 1–11 victory for St Kieran's and a second All-Ireland medal for Buckley.

=== Dicksboro ===
After experiencing championship success in the minor and under-21 grades, Buckley subsequently joined Dicksboro's top team. In 2011 Dicksboro faced Mullinavat in the intermediate championship decider. "The Boro" had the better of the first half and led at the interval by six points. Mullinavat, despite dominating most of the second half, could not turn their possession into enough scores and Dicksboro held out to take a 2–12 to 2–11 victory, with Buckley collecting a championship medal.

=== Kilkenny ===
==== Minor and under-21 ====
Buckley first played for Kilkenny in 2009 when he joined the minor side. He won his first Leinster medal that year following Kilkenny's 1–19 to 0–11 trouncing of Wexford in the provincial decider. Galway provided the opposition in the subsequent All-Ireland MHC decider on 6 September 2009. A devastating second quarter display was pivotal in powering the Westerners to a 2–15 to 2–11 victory.

In 2010, Buckley was appointed captain of the Kilkenny minor team. He won a second Leinster MHC medal that year following a 1–20 to 0–10 trouncing of Dublin. The subsequent All-Ireland MHC decider on 5 September 2010 pitted Kilkenny against Clare. "The Cats" were made to work hard before securing a narrow 2–10 to 0–14 victory, giving Buckley an All-Ireland Minor Hurling Championship medal and the honour of lifting the cup as captain.

Two years later Buckley was a key member of the Kilkenny under-21 team. He won his sole Leinster medal that year following a 4–24 to 1–13 trouncing of Laois. Kilkenny later faced Clare in the All-Ireland decider on 15 September 2012. A powerful second-half display, in which they outscored Kilkenny by 1–10 to 0–4, saw Clare take their second ever All-Ireland title in the grade.

==== Senior ====
Buckley made his senior debut for Kilkenny on 12 February 2012 in the final of the pre-season Walsh Cup. He came on as a substitute as Kilkenny defeated Galway to take the title by 2–20 to 1–14. Buckley was a regular during the subsequent league campaign, which eventually saw Kilkenny facing old rival Cork in the decider. A huge 3–21 to 0–16 victory gave him a first National Hurling League medal. Kilkenny were later shocked by Galway in the Leinster Senior Hurling Championship (SHC) decider, losing by 2–21 to 2–11; however, both sides subsequently met in the All-Ireland SHC decider on 9 September 2012. Kilkenny had led going into the final stretch; however, Joe Canning struck a stoppage time equaliser to level the game at 2–13 to 0–19 and send the final to a replay for the first time since 1959. The replay took place three weeks later on 30 September 2012. Galway stunned the reigning champions with two first-half goals; however, Kilkenny's championship debutant Walter Walsh gave a man of the match performance, claiming a 1–3 haul. The 3–22 to 3–11 Kilkenny victory gave Buckley a first All-Ireland Senior Hurling Championship (SHC) medal.

Kilkenny's dominance showed no sign of abating in 2013, with Buckley winning a second successive league medal following a 2–17 to 0–20 defeat of Tipperary in the decider.

In 2014 Buckley collected his third successive league medal, as Kilkenny secured a narrow one-point 2–25 to 1–27 extra-time victory over Tipperary. Buckley subsequently secured his first Leinster SHC medal, as a dominant Kilkenny display gave "The Cats" a 0–14 to 1–9 defeat of Dublin. On 7 September 2014, Kilkenny faced Tipperary in the All-Ireland SHC decider. In what some consider to be the greatest game of all time, the sides were level when Tipperary were awarded a controversial free. John O'Dwyer had the chance to win the game; however, his late free drifted wide resulting in a draw. The replay on 27 September 2014 was also a close affair. Goals from brothers Richie and John Power inspired Kilkenny to a 2–17 to 2–14 victory. It was Buckley's second All-Ireland SHC medal, while he was later presented with an All-Star.

Buckley won a second successive Leinster SHC medal in 2015 following a 1–25 to 2–15 defeat of Galway in the provincial decider. Kilkenny subsequently defeated Galway in the All-Ireland SHC final, earning Buckley his third Celtic Cross.

In August 2024, Buckley announced his retirement from inter-county hurling.

== Career statistics ==
Team	Year	National League			Leinster		All-Ireland		Total	
Team	Year	Division	Apps	Score	Apps	Score	Apps	Score	Apps	Score
Kilkenny	2012	Division 1	4	0–0	2	0–0	3	0–2	9	0–2
Kilkenny	2013	Division 1	2	0–2	3	0–0	1	0–0	6	0–2
Kilkenny	2014	Division 1	7	0–2	4	0–0	3	0–0	14	0–2
Kilkenny	2015	Division 1	5	0–2	2	0–1	2	0–1	9	0–4
Kilkenny	2016	Division 1	6	0–2	2	0–2	3	0–1	11	0–5
Kilkenny	2017	Division 1	6	0–6	1	0–0	2	0–0	9	0–6
Kilkenny	2018	Division 1	8	0–5	6	0–0	1	0–0	15	0–5
Kilkenny	2019	Division 1	0	0–0	1	0–0	3	0–0	4	0–0
Kilkenny	2020	Division 1	2	0–0	2	0–0	1	0–1	5	0–1
Kilkenny	2021	Division 1	4	0–1	2	0–1	1	0–0	7	0–2
Kilkenny	2022	Division 1	5	1–4	2	0–1	0	0–0	7	1–5
Kilkenny	2023	Division 1	4	0–1	6	1–1	2	0–0	12	1–2
Kilkenny	2024	Division 1	3	0–1	1	0–0	0	0–0	4	0–1
Career total			56	1–26	34	1–6	22	0–5	112	2–37

== Honours ==
St Kieran's College

- All-Ireland Colleges Senior Hurling Championship (2): 2010, 2011
- Leinster Colleges Senior Hurling Championship (2): 2010, 2011

Dicksboro

- Kilkenny Senior Hurling Championship (1): 2017
- Leinster Intermediate Club Hurling Championship (1): 2010
- Kilkenny Intermediate Hurling Championship (1): 2010
- Kilkenny Under-21 Hurling Championship (1): 2009
- Kilkenny Minor Hurling Championship (2): 2009, 2010

Kilkenny

- All-Ireland Senior Hurling Championship (3): 2012, 2014, 2015
- Leinster Senior Hurling Championship (8): 2014, 2015, 2016, 2020, 2021, 2022, 2023, 2024
- National Hurling League (5): 2012, 2013, 2014, 2018 (c), 2021
- Walsh Cup (3): 2012, 2014, 2017
- Leinster Under-21 Hurling Championship (1): 2012
- All-Ireland Minor Hurling Championship (1): 2010 (c)
- Leinster Minor Hurling Championship (2) 2009, 2010 (c)

Awards

- GAA-GPA All-Star (2): 2014, 2015

Sporting positions
Preceded by Canice Maher	Kilkenny minor hurling team captain 2010	Succeeded by
Preceded by Mark Bergin	Kilkenny senior hurling team captain 2018	Succeeded by T. J. Reid
Achievements
Preceded by Richie Cummins	All-Ireland MHC winning captain 2010	Succeeded by Shane Moloney
