= Chris Crummey =

Irish hurler (born 1993)

Personal information
- Native name: Criostóir Ó Cromtha (Irish)
- Born: 1993 (age 32–33) Lucan, Dublin, Ireland
- Occupation: Primary school teacher
- Height: 6 ft 5 in (196 cm)

Sport
- Sport: Hurling
- Position: Left wing-forward
Club
- Years: Club
- Lucan Sarsfields
Club titles
- Dublin titles: 0
College
- Years: College
- DCU Dóchas Éireann
College titles
- Fitzgibbon titles: 0
Inter-county*
Years	County	Apps (scores)
2013-2026	Dublin	24 (2-20)
Inter-county titles
- Leinster titles: 1
- All-Irelands: 0
- NHL: 0
- All Stars: 0
- *Inter County team apps and scores correct as of 21:50, 1 July 2021.

Christopher Crummey (born 1993) is an Irish hurler who plays for Dublin Senior Championship club Lucan Sarsfields and formerly at inter-county level with the Dublin senior hurling team. He is a versatile player that has played in a range of positions, including centre-back, wing-back and wing-forward.

== Career ==
A member of the Lucan Sarsfields club, Crummey first came to prominence on the inter-county scene as captain of the Dublin minor team that won the 2011 Leinster Championship. He subsequently lined out with the Dublin under-21 team as well as with DCU Dóchas Éireann in the Fitzgibbon Cup. Crummey was just out of the minor grade when he was added to the Dublin senior hurling team, making his debut during the 2013 Walsh Cup. He was a member of the extended panel that won the 2013 Leinster Championship.

== Career statistics ==
As of match played 26 June 2021.

Team	Year	National League			Leinster		All-Ireland		Total	
Team	Year	Division	Apps	Score	Apps	Score	Apps	Score	Apps	Score
Dublin	2013	Division 1B	0	0-00	0	0-00	0	0-00	0	0-00
Dublin	2014	Division 1A	0	0-00	0	0-00	0	0-00	0	0-00
Dublin	2015	Division 1A	7	0-03	2	0-00	3	0-01	12	0-04
Dublin	2016	Division 1A	5	0-01	2	0-00	1	0-01	8	0-02
Dublin	2017	Division 1A	6	0-10	1	0-02	2	0-01	9	0-13
Dublin	2018	Division 1B	6	0-01	4	0-05	—		10	0-06
Dublin	2019	Division 1B	6	0-04	4	1-03	1	0-00	11	1-07
Dublin	2020	Division 1B	4	0-04	2	1-04	1	0-03	7	1-11
Dublin	2021	Division 1B	5	0-06	1	0-00	0	0-00	6	0-06
Career total			39	0-29	16	2-14	8	0-06	63	2-49

== Honours ==
Dublin

- Leinster Senior Hurling Championship: 2013
- Walsh Cup: 2013, 2016
- Leinster Minor Hurling Championship: 2011 (c)

Sporting positions
Preceded by Liam Rushe	Dublin Senior Hurling Captain; 2018	Succeeded by Seán Moran
