= 2010 Walsh Cup =

Tournament details
- Province: Leinster
- Year: 2010
- Trophy: Walsh Cup

Winners
- Champions: Galway (1st win)
- Manager: John McIntyre
- Captain: Shane Kavanagh

Runners-up
- Runners-up: Dublin
- Manager: Anthony Daly
- Captain: Richie Kehoe

The 2010 Walsh Cup is a hurling competition played by the teams of Leinster GAA, a team from Connacht GAA and a team from Ulster GAA. The competition differs from the Leinster Senior Hurling Championship as it also features further education colleges from both Leinster and Connacht and the winning team does not progress to another tournament at All-Ireland level. The four losers of the preliminary round and the quarter-finals enter the Walsh Shield.

== Walsh Cup ==
Preliminary round 24 January 2010
U.C.D.	2-14
Antrim	3-10
Carlow	1-8
N.U.I.G.	1-17
Laois	1-25
GMIT	1-13
Offaly	1-19
D.I.T.	1-18

Quarter-finals; 30/31 January 2010
UCD	1-13
Wexford	2-16
N.U.I.G.	0-12
Dublin	2-16
Laois	2-16
Galway	4-24
Offaly	1-16
Kilkenny	1-13

Semi-finals; 6 February 2010
Wexford	2-13
Dublin	2-17
Galway	1-22
Offaly	2-16

Final
Dublin	1-15
Galway	1-22

=== Preliminary round ===
24 January 2010

U.C.D.	1-25 - 3-10	Antrim
M Nolan 0-11 (0-9f), P Atkinson 2-2, L Ryan, C Lyng 1-2 each, D O'Connor 0-3, J Boland 0-1.	Report	PJ O'Connell 2-1, K McKeegan 1-1 (1-0f, 0-1 '65'), N McManus 0-4 (0-3f), P McGill, M Scullion, S McRory, J McIntosh 0-1 each.

Belfield
Referee: Joe O'Kelly (Wexford)
24 January 2010

NUI Galway	1-17 - 1-8	Carlow
F Coone 0-10 (9fs, '65) J Conlon 0-5 (3fs), S Quinlan 1-0, K Heagney, J O'Gorman 0-1 each.	Report	D English 0-5 (4fs), R Dunbar 1-0 (pen) P Keogh 0-2 (2fs), D Roberts 0-1.

24 January 2010

Laois	1-25 - 1-13	GMIT
W Hyland 0-7(4f), E Costello 1-2, B Campion 0-5 (4f), C Delaney 0-3, M McEvoy, J Brophy, D Peacock 0-2 (1f) each, S Dollard, J Rowney 0-1 each.	Report	E Feeney 0-6 (5f), A O'Shaughnessy 1-1 (1-0f), T Flannery 0-2, C Flannery(1f), G Mahon (1f), L Hands, P Sheehan 0-1 each.

Referee: T Anderson (Offaly)
24 January 2010

Offaly	1-19 - 1-18	D.I.T.
O Kealey 0-8 (0-6fs), C Parlon 1-1, D Horan 0-4 (0-3fs), G Healion 0-3, K Brady, F Daly and S Kelly 0-1 each.	Report	P Ryan 0-9 (4fs), H Kehoe 1-2, J Clarke, M Moloney (1f) 0-2 each, P Lynch (f), P Kelly and P Hartley 0-1 each.

Rath
Referee: D Hughes (Carlow)

=== Quarter-finals ===
31 January 2010

UCD	1-13 - 2-16	Wexford
P Atkinson 0-6 (0-3f), C Waldron 1-0, L Rushe 0-3 (0-2f), J Boland 0-2, L Ryan, C Gleeson 0-1 each.	Report	D Lyng 0-9, (0-7f, 0-1, 65; S Banville, J Berry 1-1 each, D Nolan 0-3, C Farrell, P J Nolan 0-1 each.

Gorey
Referee: A Stapleton (Wexford)
30 January 2010

N.U.I.G.	0-12 - 2-16	Dublin
F Coone 0-7 (0-6f), J Conlon 0-3 (0-2f), D Barrett, K Heagney 0-1.	Report	J Kelly 0-5, K Flynn (0-1f), D Curtin 1-2 each, A McCrabbe 0-4 (0-4f), J McCaffrey 0-2, S Ryan 0-1.

Portmarnock
Referee: B Gavin (Offaly)
31 January 2010

Laois	2-16 - 4-24 A.E.T.	Galway
W Hyland 1-8 (0-5f), J Rowney 1-1, J Brophy 0-3, B Campion 0-2 (0-2f), M Whelan, J Purcell, J Dunne (0-1) each.	Report	G Farragher 1-9 (0-8f), R Cummins 2-2, J Gantley 1-1, N Cahalan 0-4 (0-1f), A Harte 0-3, C Donnellan, A Callanan 0-2 each, D Barry 0-1.

Referee: D Connelly (Offaly).
31 January 2010

Offaly	1-16 - 1-13	Kilkenny
D Currams 0-4 (0-4f), C Parlon, J Bergin (0-2f) 0-3 each, G Healion 1-0, R Hanniffy, S Kelly 0-2 each, G Oakley, K Brady 0-1 each.	Report	M Boran 1-1, R Hogan 0-4 (0-2f), J Mulhall 0-3, M Grace 0-2, E McGrath, M Bergin, PJ Delaney (0-1f) 0-1 each.

O'Connor Park
Referee: J McGrath (Westmeath)

=== Semi-finals ===
6 February 2010

Galway	1-22 - 2-16	Offaly
G Farragher 0-10 (0-7f, 2 '65, 1 sideline); J Gantley 1-6; D Burke 0-3; A Callanan, A Harte, C Donnellan 0-1 each.	Report	S Dooley 1-7 (0-5f); G Healion 1-2; R Hanniffy, K Brady 0-2 each; G Oakley, C Mahon, E Kelly (0-1f) 0-1 each.

6 February 2010

Wexford	2-13 - 2-17	Dublin
D Lyng 1-7 (1-5f); J Berry 1-2; C Farrell (0-1f), W Doran, S Banville, C Kenny 0-1 each.	Report	A McCrabbe 0-6 (0-2f); J McCaffrey 0-4 (0-2 '65s); S Ryan 1-1; K O'Loughlin 1-0; M O'Brien 0-2; K Flynn, D Byrne, S Lambert, M Carton 0-1 each.

=== Final ===
14 February 2010

Galway	1-22 - 1-15	Dublin
G Farragher 0-9 (5f,1 sl), J Gantley 1-3, A Callanan 0-3, D Burke, A Harte 0-2 each, N Cahalan, N Hayes, I Tannian 0-1 each.	Report	A McCrabbe 0-11 (7f, 1 sl), S Durkin 1-0, S Lambert 0-2, S Ryan, K Flynn 0-1 each.

Parnell Park
Referee: J Owens (Wexford)

== Walsh Shield ==
The Walsh Shield consists of the 8 losing teams from the preliminary round and the quarter-finals of the Walsh Cup.

Quarter-finals		Semi-finals		Final
Antrim	2-23
N.U.I.G.	4-15	Antrim	1-15
UCD	0-11	Carlow	2-14
Carlow	2-14			Laois	1-16
GMIT	0-8			Carlow	1-10
Kilkenny	8-20	Kilkenny	1-16
Laois	1-24	Laois	1-17
D.I.T.	2-13

=== Quarter-finals ===
6 February 2010

Antrim	2-23 - 4-15	N.U.I.G.
N McManus 0-12 (5f, 1 '45), E McCluskey 2-1, S McNaughton 0-6, M Scullion 0-2, C McVaughan, D Hamill 0-1 each.	Report	D Sullivan 2-0, S Quinlan 1-2, D Reidy 0-5 (2f), D O'Flynn 1-0, K Keehan, D Barrett, G Kelly 0-2 each, J O'Gorman, P Kennedy 0-1 each.

Dunganny
6 February 2010

UCD	0-11 - 2-14	Carlow
J Foley (2f), C Waldron 0-3 each, D O'Connor, D Purcell, P Donohoe, J Maher, E Mac Suibhne 0-1 each.	Report	P Kehoe 2-9 (0-5f, 0-1 '65), D Roberts, C Doyle, A Gaule, E Minchin and E Coady 0-1 each.

Dr Cullen Park
Referee: D Connolly (Kilkenny
6 February 2010

GMIT	0-8 - 8-20	Kilkenny
R Madden 0-4 (4f), J Gelston 0-1 (1f), L Hands 0-1 (1f).	Report	M Bergin 2-9 (4f), M Ruth 3-1, M Boran 2-0, M Grace 1-2, E McGrath 0-4, J Mulhall, L Ryan 0-2.

7 February 2010

Laois	1-24 - 2-13	D.I.T.
J Rowney 1-5, J Purcell, W Hyland 0-4 each, J Brophy (0-1f), B Campion (0-2f) 0-3 each, B Dunne 0-2, J Dunne, JJ McHugh, D Peacock 0-1 each.	Report	D O'Dwyer 2-2, D Tracey 0-4, S Bourke 0-3, J Clarke, T Maloney, N Kelly, R Butler 0-1 each.

Referee: P Murphy (Carlow)

=== Semi-finals ===
13 February 2010

Laois	1-17 - 1-16	Kilkenny
W Hyland 0-8 (6f), B Campion 0-3 (2f), J Dunne 1-0, D Peacock 0-2, E Jackman, B Dunne, E Costelloe, J Purcell 0-1 each.	Report	M Bergin 0-7 (6f), J Mulhall 1-3, E McGrath, M Ruth 0-2 each, P Hogan, M Grace 0-1 each.

Castlecomer
Referee: D Murphy (Wexford)
14 February 2010

Carlow	2-14 - 1-15	Antrim
E Byrne 1-3, R Dunbar 1-1, C Hughes 0-3 (1f), A Gaule, R Coady (1f, 1 '65) 0-2 each, C Doyle, B Lawler and P Kehoe 0-1 each.	Report	L Watson 0-7 (0-5f), S McCrory 0-4, E McCloskey 1-0, A Smiley 0-2, K McKeegan (1f), M Scullion 0-1 each.

Dr Cullen Park
Referee: J Kelly (Wexford

=== Final ===
18 April 2010

Laois	1-16 – 1-10	Carlow
	doubled as NHL match

Dr Cullen Park
Referee: T Carroll (Offaly)
