= Ryan O'Dwyer =

Irish hurler and Gaelic footballer

Personal information
- Native name: Ryan Ó Dubhuir (Irish)
- Born: 23 July 1986 (age 40) Cashel, Ireland
- Occupation: Teacher
- Height: 1.85 m (6 ft 1 in)

Sport
- Sport: Hurling
- Position: Centre forward
Clubs
- Years: Club
- 2003–2010 2011–2020 2021-: Cashel King Cormacs; Kilmacud Crokes; Cashel King Cormacs
Club titles
- Dublin titles: 2
Inter-county
- Years: County
- 2007–2009 2011–2018: Tipperary; Dublin
Inter-county titles
- Leinster titles: 2 (1 Munster)
- NHL: 2 (1 for Tipp)

Ryan O'Dwyer (born 23 July 1986) is an Irish former inter-county hurler who played as a half forward for Dublin. He continues to play club hurling with Kilmacud Crokes. The County Tipperary-born player previously hurled with his local club Cashel King Cormac's and with the Tipperary senior inter-county team. In 2019 O’Dwyer began coaching Longwood, a small rural club in Meath, with notable players such as Michael Burke. The team will compete in the Meath senior hurling championship of 2019.

== Playing career ==
=== Club ===
O'Dwyer played his club hurling and football with the famous King Cormac's club in his home town. He has enjoyed some success but has never won a senior county title. In 2011 he joined Dublin side Kilmacud Crokes.

=== Inter-county ===
Tipperary

O'Dwyer first came to prominence on the inter-county scene as a member of the Tipperary minor football team in 2004. He was also a member of the county under-21 hurling team in the mid-2000s. He was a member of the panel in 2005 and went on to capture a Munster medal in that grade in 2006. The following year O'Dwyer made his senior debut in a National Hurling League game against Kilkenny. Later that summer he made his senior championship debut, but Tipp had little success. In 2008 the county got off to a winning start with O'Dwyer playing a key role in helping the county capture the National League title. In 2010 he was part of the Tipperary senior football panel.

Dublin

At the end of 2010 he declared for the Dublin senior hurling team for the 2011 season. He helped Dublin to win the Walsh Cup after beating Kilkenny in the final. He then played on the Dublin side which won the NHL Division 1 title for the first time since the 1930s, also beating Kilkenny in the final, also being named the Man of the Match. In the 2011 Leinster championship semi-final against Galway, he was shown a straight red card for striking Shane Kavanagh with his hurley, he received a four-week suspension and so missed the Leinster final against Kilkenny. After missing the Leinster Championship final defeat against Kilkenny, Ryan returned for the All-Ireland quarter final against Limerick. Dublin won the quarter-final, qualifying for the All-Ireland semi final for the first time since 1948. O'Dwyer scored 3–02 in the game and was awarded the man of the match award.

O'Dwyer announced his retirement from inter-county in July 2018 following Dublin's exit from the championship. He played eight seasons of hurling for his adopted county winning a National Hurling League in 2011 where he received the man of the match award in the final. O'Dwyer was also a key player on the Dublin team that won a Leinster Senior Hurling Championship in 2013 bridging a 52-year gap having not won the competition since 1961.

=== Inter-provincial ===
O'Dwyer lined out for Leinster in the Interprovincial Championship. He secured a winners' medal in this competition in 2012 following a 2–19 to 1–15 defeat of Connacht.

=== Controversies ===
==== Disciplinary issues ====
In the 2011 All-Ireland semi-final, O'Dwyer was sent off for striking Shane Kavanagh with his hurley. He received a four-week suspension, which ruled him out of the Leinster Final that year.

==== Public criticism of teammates and team performances ====
O'Dwyer has been outspoken in the media regarding Dublin hurling performances and internal dynamics. In 2016, he criticized unnamed teammates for not fully committing to then-manager Ger Cunningham, stating they should "bite the bullet or clear off." In 2020, following a disappointing display, he described a Dublin performance as “disheartening” and said it placed “huge pressure” on the team.

==== Mentality and aggression ====
O'Dwyer has described adopting an intense psychological approach on the field, stating: "Even the lads I did like—for 70 or 75 minutes, I had to hate them." In a separate interview, he referred to hurling as a "warrior's game", which some interpreted as reinforcing an overly combative mindset.

==== Criticism of GAA scheduling ====
O'Dwyer has been critical of administrative decisions by the GAA. In particular, he opposed the move to start the All-Ireland Hurling Championship in April, calling it “totally wrong” and arguing it pushed the game “back into the dark ages” by failing to adequately promote hurling on a national stage.

== Honours ==
Tipperary

- Munster Senior Hurling Championship (1): 2008
- National Hurling League (1): 2008

Dublin

- Walsh Cup (1): 2011
- National Hurling League (1): 2011
- Leinster Senior Hurling Championship (1): 2013

Leinster

- Railway Cup (2): 2012, 2014

== Personal life ==
O'Dwyer is married to Clíodhna, with whom he has two children.

In October 2015, he was the victim of a serious assault while in Birmingham, sustaining a fractured skull, broken jaw, and brain hemorrhage. He later spoke publicly about the emotional and psychological impact of the incident, describing a period of increased irritability and difficulty in his personal relationships, particularly with his then-fiancée. Support from his family, the Dublin GAA medical team, and psychologist Chris Thompson played a key role in his recovery.

In April 2024, O'Dwyer was involved in a traffic accident near Newlands Cross in Dublin, during which he was reportedly accompanied by his children. Outside of sport, he works as a school teacher.
