= 2013 Walsh Cup =

Tournament details
- Year: 2013
- Trophy: Walsh Cup
- Sponsor: Bord na Móna

Winners
- Champions: Dublin (6th win)
- Manager: Anthony Daly
- Captain: Johnny McCaffrey

Runners-up
- Runners-up: Wexford
- Manager: Liam Dunne
- Captain: Richie Kehoe

The 2013 Bord na Móna Walsh Cup was the 51st staging of the Walsh Cup since its establishment in 1954. The draw for the 2013 fixtures took place on 8 November 2012. The competition began on 20 January 2013 and ended on 10 February 2013.

Kilkenny were the defending champions.

Dublin won the cup for the second time in three years.

== Teams ==
A total of twelve teams contested the Walsh Cup, including a return for all the teams from the 2012 Walsh Cup.

Antrim made a return to the Walsh Cup in 2013, after pulling out of the previous year's competition.

== Results ==
=== First round ===
20 January
First round

Wexford	1-29 – 2-19	Dublin Institute of Technology

St. Brigid's Park, Blackwater

20 January
First round

Westmeath	0-15 – 3-15	National University of Ireland, Galway

St Loman’s, Mullingar

20 January
First round

Laois	1-11 – 0-15	University College Dublin

Kelly-O'Daly Park, Rathdowney

20 January
First round

Carlow	1-17 – 0-10	Antrim

Dr. Cullen Park, Carlow

=== Quarter-finals ===
27 January
Quarter-final

Wexford	1-24 – 1-15	Offaly

St. Brigid's Park, Blackwater

26 January
Quarter-final

National University of Ireland, Galway	0-15 – 0-17	Kilkenny

O'Loughlin Gaels GAA, Kilkenny

25 January
Quarter-final

University College Dublin	scr. – w/o	Dublin
	Report

Parnell Park

27 January
Quarter-final D

Carlow	1-8 – 2-16	Galway

Dr. Cullen Park, Carlow

=== Semi-finals ===
2 February
Semi-final

Dublin	2-19 – 1-21	Galway

Parnell Park

3 February
Semi-final

Wexford	2-18 – 0-16	Kilkenny

St. Brigid's Park, Blackwater

=== Final ===
10 February
Final

Dublin	1-19 – 0-16	Wexford
Paul Ryan 0-12 (0-9f, 0-1 ’65), David O’Callaghan 1-1, Danny Sutcliffe 0-2, Johnny McCaffrey, Joey Boland, Conal Keaney, Kevin Byrne 0-1 each	Report	Paul Morris 0-7 (0-2f), Lee Chin 0-3, Eoin Doyle, Podge Doran, Andrew Shore (0-1 sideline), Richie Kehoe (0-1f), PJ Nolan, Garrett Sinnott 0-1 each

Bellefield, Enniscorthy
Referee: Tony Carroll (Offaly)
