= 2007 Walsh Cup =

Hurling competition

Tournament details
- Trophy: Walsh Cup

Winners
- Champions: Kilkenny (16th win)
- Manager: Brian Cody
- Captain: Noel Hickey

Runners-up
- Runners-up: Wexford
- Manager: John Meyler
- Captain: Damien Fitzhenry

The 2007 Walsh Cup was a hurling competition played by the teams of Leinster and Ulster. 9 teams competed: 6 Leinster counties, 2 Ulster counties and one third-level college. Lower-level teams competed in the 2007 Kehoe Cup.

Kilkenny won.

== Results ==
=== Preliminary round ===
21 January 2007

Laois	2-15 – 1-9	Down

=== Quarter finals ===
27 January 2007

Laois	1-17 – 1-16	Dublin

28 January 2007

Offaly	2-22 – 1-7	Westmeath

28 January 2007

Wexford	3-20 – 1-14	Antrim

28 January 2007

Kilkenny	3-18 – 1-14	UCD

=== Semi-finals ===
4 February 2007

Laois	1-14 – 2-22	Wexford

4 February 2007

Kilkenny	2-13 – 0-15	Offaly

=== Final ===
25 February 2007

Kilkenny	1-13 – 0-10	Wexford
E Larkin 0-5 (5f), PJ Delaney 1-0 (1-0f); A Fogarty 0-3, D Lyng 0-2, P Cleere, E Brennan, J Dalton 0-1 each	Report	P Carley 0-4 (4f), R Jacob 0-2, M Jacob, R Kehoe, P Doran, R McCarthy 0-1 each

Wexford Park
Referee: A Stapleton (Laois)
