= 2019 Walsh Cup =

Thank you for letting me know

Tournament details
- Province: Leinster
- Year: 2019
- Sponsor: Bord na Móna

Winners
- Champions: Galway (3rd win)
- Manager: Micheál Donoghue
- Captain: Pádraic Mannion

Runners-up
- Runners-up: Wexford
- Manager: Davy Fitzgerald
- Captain: Shaun Murphy

Other
- Matches played: 9

The 2019 Walsh Cup is an early-season inter-county hurling competition based primarily in the Irish province of Leinster.

Seven counties competed – six from Leinster, Galway from Connacht and none from Ulster. No third-level college teams took part. Four Leinster counties plus Antrim from Ulster played in the second-ranked Kehoe Cup. The two remaining Leinster counties competed in the third-ranked Kehoe Shield.

It took place in December 2018 and January 2019 and was won by Galway.

== Competition format ==
Three teams—Kilkenny, Galway, and Wexford — receive a bye to the semi-finals. The remaining four teams compete in an initial group stage, with each team playing the other teams once. Two points are awarded for a win and one for a draw. The group winners advance to the semi-finals.

== Results ==
=== Group stage ===
Games played 9 December 2018 – 6 January 2019.

Team	Pld	W	D	L	Pts	Diff
Dublin	3	3	0	0	6	+19
Carlow	3	2	0	1	4	+6
Laois	3	1	0	2	2	–7
Offaly	3	0	0	3	0	–18

=== Semi-finals ===
13 January 2019
14:00 GMT (UTC±0)
Semi-final

Wexford	0-16 – 0-13	Kilkenny
Pádraig Foley 0-7 (6f), Harry Kehoe 0-3 (3f), Aidan Nolan, Ian Byrne, Jack O’Connor (f), Diarmuid O’Keeffe, Conor McDonald (f), Seamus Casey (f) 0-1 each	Report	Kevin Kelly 0-5 (4f), Martin Keoghan 0-2, Luke Scanlon, Conor Fogarty, Conor Delaney, Ger Malone, Paddy Deegan, Richie Hogan (f) 0-1 each

Bellefield GAA Complex, Enniscorthy
Referee: John Keenan (Wicklow)
13 January 2019
14:00 GMT (UTC±0)
Semi-final

Dublin	1-17 – 0-21	Galway
John Hetherton 0-8fs, Sean Moran 1-0pen, Eamonn Dillon 0-2, Donal Burke 0-2, Osin O’Rorke 0-2fs, Chris Crummey 0-2, Fergal Whitely 0-1	Report	Cathal Mannion 0-10 (5f), Brian Concannon 0-3 (1f), Davey Glennon 0-2 (1f), Sean Blehane 0-2, Padraic Mannion 0-1, Aidan Harte 0-1, Conor Whelan 0-1, Joe Canning 0-1 (sideline).

Parnell Park, Donnycarney
Referee: Paud O’Dwyer (Carlow)

=== Final ===
20 January 2019
14:00 GMT (UTC±0)
Final

Wexford	0-20 – 1-23	Galway
I Byrne 0-5fs; P Foley (f, '65'), D Dunne, C McDonald, M O’Hanlon, P Morris 0-2 each; K Foley, C Dunbar, D O’Keeffe, M Fanning (pen), H Kehoe 0-1 each.	Report	J Canning 0-13 (10f, 1 '65'); A Harte 1-0; C Mannion 0-4, J Coyne, D Glennon, S Kilduff, S Bleahene, S Linnane, T Haran 0-1 each

Bellefield GAA Complex, Enniscorthy
Referee: Seán Cleere (Kilkenny)
