= 2020 Walsh Cup =

Former inter-county hurling contest

Tournament details
- Province: Leinster
- Year: 2020
- Sponsor: Bord na Móna

Winners
- Champions: Wexford (17th win)
- Manager: Davy Fitzgerald
- Captain: Jack O'Connor

Runners-up
- Runners-up: Galway
- Manager: Shane O'Neill
- Captain: Pádraic Mannion

Other
- Matches played: 9

The 2020 Walsh Cup was an early-season inter-county hurling competition based in the Irish province of Leinster.

Seven counties compete – six from Leinster, Galway from Connacht and none from Ulster. No third-level college teams took part. Six other counties from Leinster and Ulster play in the second-ranked Kehoe Cup.

It took place in December 2019 and January 2020.

Wexford were the winners.

== Competition format ==
Three teams receive a bye to the semi-finals – Kilkenny, Galway and Wexford. The remaining four teams compete in an initial group stage with each team playing the other teams once. Two points are awarded for a win and one for a draw. The group winners advance to the semi-finals. If the semi-final or final games are drawn, a penalty shoot-out is used to decide the winner; there is no extra time played.

== Fixtures and results ==
=== Round-robin ===
Pos	Team	Pld	W	D	L	PF	PA	PD	Pts	Qualification
1	Dublin	3	3	0	0	85	52	+33	6	Advance to semi-final
2	Westmeath	3	2	0	1	58	54	+4	4	
3	Laois	3	1	0	2	59	76	−17	2	
4	Carlow	3	0	0	3	54	74	−20	0	

Updated to match(es) played on 9 January 2020. Source: Leinster GAA

8 December 2019 Round 1	Westmeath	2-12 (18) – (14) 0-14	Carlow	Kinnegad
14:00 GMT (UTC±0)				Venue: Coralstown/Kinnegad GAA
		Report

15 December 2019 Round 2	Westmeath	0-17 (17) – (25) 1-22	Dublin	Mullingar
13:00 GMT (UTC±0)				Venue: Cusack Park
		Report		Referee: Gavin Quilty (Kilkenny)

15 December 2019 Round 2	Carlow	0-22 (22) – (27) 3-19	Laois	Carlow
14:00 GMT (UTC±0)				Venue: Dr Cullen Park
		Report		Referee: Thomas Gleeson (Dublin)

5 January 2020 Round 3	Dublin	3-20 (29) – (18) 0-18	Carlow	Donnycarney
14:00 GMT (UTC±0)				Venue: Parnell Park
		Report		Referee: Gearóid McGrath

5 January 2020 Round 3	Laois	1-12 (15) – (23) 2-17	Westmeath	Borris-in-Ossory
14:00 GMT (UTC±0)				Venue: O'Keeffe Park
		Report		Referee: Justin Heffernan

9 January 2020 Round 1	Dublin	1-28 (31) – (17) 0-17	Laois	Donnycarney
19:45 GMT (UTC±0)				Venue: Parnell Park
		Report		Referee: Barry Redmond

=== Finals ===
12 January 2020
14:00 GMT (UTC±0)
Semi-Final

Report

Kilkenny	1-09 (12) – (24) 2-18	Wexford
(HT: 0-05 – 1-08)

John Locke Park, Callan
Referee: Seán Stack

12 January 2020
14:00 GMT (UTC±0)
Semi-Final

Report

Dublin	0-18 (18) – (19) 0-19	Galway
(HT: 0-11 – 0-12)

Parnell Park, Donnycarney
Referee: Patrick Murphy

19 January 2020
17:00 GMT (UTC±0)
Final

Report

Wexford	1-16 (19) – (18) 0-18	Galway
(HT: 0-08 – 0-10)

O'Moore Park, Portlaoise
Referee: Michael Murtagh (Westmeath)
