= 2024 Walsh Cup =

Tournament details
- Province: Leinster, Ulster, Connacht
- Year: 2023
- Sponsor: Dioralyte
- Date: 4–28 January 2024
- Teams: 9
- Defending champions: Galway

Winners
- Champions: Wexford (18th win)
- Manager: Keith Rossiter
- Captain: Lee Chin

Runners-up
- Runners-up: Galway
- Manager: Henry Shefflin
- Captain: Daithí Burke

Other
- Matches played: 11

The 2024 Walsh Cup was an early-season inter-county hurling competition based in the Irish province of Leinster and taking place in January 2024.

Nine county teams competed — seven from Leinster (Carlow, Dublin, Kilkenny, Laois, Offaly, Westmeath, Wexford); Galway from Connacht; and Antrim from Ulster. Four other teams from Leinster and Ulster played in the second-ranked 2024 Kehoe Cup.

Wexford were the winners.

== Competition format ==
The teams are drawn into three groups of three teams. Each team plays the other teams in their group once. Two points are awarded for a win and one for a draw.

Two group winners play each other in a semi-final, and the winners of that game play the other group winners in the final.

== Results ==
=== Group 1 ===
| Pos | Team | Pld | W | D | L | PF | PA | PD | Pts | Qualification |
|---|---|---|---|---|---|---|---|---|---|---|
| 1 | Wexford | 2 | 2 | 0 | 0 | 47 | 36 | +11 | 4 | Advance to final |
| 2 | Kilkenny | 2 | 1 | 0 | 1 | 54 | 27 | +27 | 2 | |
| 3 | Carlow | 2 | 0 | 0 | 2 | 28 | 66 | −38 | 0 | |

Source: Leinster GAA

=== Group 2 ===
| Pos | Team | Pld | W | D | L | PF | PA | PD | Pts | Qualification |
|---|---|---|---|---|---|---|---|---|---|---|
| 1 | Dublin | 2 | 2 | 0 | 0 | 74 | 38 | +36 | 4 | Advance to semi-final |
| 2 | Antrim (Note: Antrim v. Westmeath was not played.) | 1 | 0 | 0 | 1 | 23 | 37 | −14 | 0 | |
| 3 | Westmeath | 1 | 0 | 0 | 1 | 15 | 37 | −22 | 0 | |

Source: Leinster GAA

=== Group 3 ===
| Pos | Team | Pld | W | D | L | PF | PA | PD | Pts | Qualification |
|---|---|---|---|---|---|---|---|---|---|---|
| 1 | Galway (Note: Galway led Offaly by 4-15 to 1-11 when the game was called off after 55 minutes due to heavy fog. It was later decided that this result would stand.) | 2 | 2 | 0 | 0 | 74 | 40 | +34 | 4 | Advance to semi-final |
| 2 | Laois | 2 | 1 | 0 | 1 | 50 | 65 | −15 | 2 | |
| 3 | Offaly | 2 | 0 | 0 | 2 | 32 | 51 | −19 | 0 | |

Source: Leinster GAA

=== Finals ===
20 January 2024
13:00 WET (UTC±00:00)
Semi-Final

Report

| Dublin | 0-17 (17) – (27) 1-24 | Galway |
|---|---|---|
(HT: 0-07 – 1-11)
| Pts: C O’Sullivan 7 (5fs), S Currie 3fs, B Hayes 2, C Foley 1, D Purcell 1, D Leavy 1, A Considine 1, D O Dulaing 1 | | Gls: J Flynn 1 Pts: Niland 17 (11fs, 1 ‘65’), D McLoughlin 3, R Glennon 1, D O’Shea 1, T Monaghan 1, M McManus 1 |

Parnell Park, Donnycarney
Referee: E Furlong (Wexford)

28 January 2024
13:30 WET (UTC±00:00)
Final

Report

| Wexford | 1-21 (24) – (16) 0-16 | Galway |
|---|---|---|
(HT: 0-11 – 0-08)
| Gls: Seamus Casey 1 Pts: Lee Chin 9 (5f), James Byrne 3, Corey Byrne Dunbar 3, Cian Byrne 2, Jack O'Connor 2, Richie Lawlor 1, Conor Hearne 1 | | Pts: Kevin Cooney 5 (4f), Tom Monaghan 3, Alex Connaire 2, Evan Niland 2fs, Sean O'Hanlon 1, Greg Thomas 1, Martin McManus 1, Donal O'Shea 1 ('65') |

Netwatch Cullen Park, Carlow
Referee: Owen Beehan (Kilkenny)
