= 2005 Walsh Cup =

Tournament details
- Trophy: Walsh Cup

Winners
- Champions: Kilkenny (14th win)
- Manager: Brian Cody
- Captain: James McGarry

Runners-up
- Runners-up: Wexford
- Manager: Séamus Murphy
- Captain: Michael Jacob

The 2005 Walsh Cup was a hurling competition played by the teams of Leinster and Ulster. 8 teams competed: 5 Leinster counties, 2 Ulster counties and one third-level college. Lower-level teams competed in the 2005 Kehoe Cup.

Kilkenny won their first Cup in thirteen years.

== Results ==
=== Quarter-finals ===
23 January 2005

Offaly	0-16 – 0-10	Down

30 January 2005

Kilkenny	1-14 – 1-13	Dublin

Parnell Park
30 January 2005

Antrim	5-19 – 4-19	Laois

30 January 2005

Wexford	5-14 – 1-10	UCD

=== Semi-finals ===
5 February 2005

Wexford	5-19 – 1-14	Antrim

6 February 2005

Kilkenny	5-20 – 0-10	Offaly

=== Final ===
12 February 2005
2.30 p.m.

Kilkenny	1-13 – 0-10	Wexford
H Shefflin (0-5: 2f, 1 '65'); J Maher (1-0); J Hoyne, E Brennan, W O'Dwyer (0-2 each); JJ Delaney, C Phelan (0-1 each)	Report	P Carley (0-4: 3f, 1 '65'); N Higgins (0-3); B Lambert (0-1f); D Lyng, D Mythen (0-1 each).

Wexford Park, Wexford
