= 2026 Walsh Cup =

Hurling competition on the island of Ireland

Tournament details
- Province: Leinster, Ulster, Connacht
- Year: 2026
- Sponsor: Dioralyte
- Date: 4–18 January 2026
- Teams: 10
- Defending champions: Wexford

Winners
- Champions: Galway (5th win)
- Manager: Micheál Donoghue
- Captain: Darren Morrissey

Runners-up
- Runners-up: Dublin
- Manager: Niall Ó Ceallacháin

Other
- Matches played: 6 (Cup); 4 (Shield)

The 2026 Walsh Cup was a hurling competition for county teams in the provinces of Leinster, Ulster and Connacht.

The draw was announced in November 2025, with the competition commencing on 4 January. Features announced in advance included penalties to decide matches instead of extra time, any number of substitutions permitted, matches being reduced to 60 minutes, and "a Shield competition" intended to guarantee every team was involved in more than one match.

The early rounds were marred by cold weather, with 3 first round games being cancelled due to frozen pitches; three teams, including Kilkenny, were knocked out via coin toss. Galway won the tournament after beating Offaly and Dublin.

== Format ==
The ten teams play in the first round. The five winners progress. Three of the first round winners go into the semi-finals, and two of them play a quarter-final.

The five losers in the first round are transferred to the Walsh Shield, which is also a straight knockout. This structure means that every team is guaranteed at least two games.

Drawn games go straight to a penalty shootout without any extra time being played. Games which cannot be played due to weather conditions are decided by coin toss.

== Walsh Cup ==
=== Round 1 ===
4 January 2026
13:30 IWT (UTC±0)
Match 4

Laois	0-17 (17) – (23) 1-20	Wexford

Kelly Daly Park, Rathdowney

4 January 2026
13:30 IWT (UTC±0)
Match 5

Report

Carlow	0-17 (17) – (23) 0-23	Dublin

South East Technological University, Carlow

4 January 2026
14:00 IWT (UTC±0)
Match 2

Offaly	w/o – scr.	Antrim

Glenisk O'Connor Park, Tullamore

- Game not played due to frozen pitch. Result was decided via coin toss.

4 January 2026
14:00 IWT (UTC±0)
Match 1

Kildare	scr. – w/o	Galway

St. Conleth's Park, Newbridge

- Game not played due to frozen pitch. Result was decided via coin toss.

4 January 2026
14:30 IWT (UTC±0)
Match 3

Westmeath	w/o – scr.	Kilkenny

Dovida Lakepoint Park, Mullingar

- Game not played due to frozen pitch. Result was decided via coin toss.

=== Quarter-final ===
8 January 2026
19:30 IWT (UTC±0)
Quarter-final

Wexford	1-11 (14) – (23) 2-17	Dublin

Oulart–The Ballagh GAA, Oulart

=== Semi-finals ===
11 January 2026
14:30 IWT (UTC±0)
Semi-final 1

Report

Dublin	3-24 (33) – (20) 2-14	Westmeath

Parnell Park, Donnycarney

11 January 2026
14:30 IWT (UTC±0)
Semi-final 2

Report

Galway	2-22 (28) – (17) 0-17	Offaly
(HT: 0-13 – 0-08)

Duggan Park, Ballinasloe
Referee: James McGrath (Westmeath)

=== Final ===
Spórt TG4 YouTube

17 January 2024
13:30 IWT (UTC±0)
Walsh Cup Final

Report

Dublin	2-13 (19) – (19) 1-16 (1–2 pen)	Galway
(HT: 2-08 – 0-11)
Gls: D Burke 1pen, O Gaffney 1 Pts: D Burke 4 (2fs), C Burke 2, C Donohoe 2, C O'Sullivan 2, C Groarke 1		Gls: C Whelan 1 Pts: E Niland 7 (6fs), J Fleming 2, P Mac Cárthaigh 2, D McLoughlin 2, A Connaire 1, T Monaghan 1, C Cooney 1f

Parnell Park, Donnycarney
Referee: Eamonn Furlong (Wexford)

== Walsh Shield ==
=== Quarter-final ===
8 January 2026
19:30 IWT (UTC±0)

Laois	3-14 (23) – (18) 2-12	Carlow

Bill Delaney Park, Stradbally

=== Semi-finals ===
11 January 2026
14:00 IWT (UTC±0)

Laois	0-10 (10) – 2-17 (23)	Kilkenny

Kelly O'Daly Park, Rathdowney

11 January 2026
14:30 IWT (UTC±0)

Kildare	0-17 (17) – 2-10 (16)	Antrim

Manguard Park, Newbridge

=== Shield Final ===
18 January 2026
14:00 IWT (UTC±0)
Walsh Shield Final

Report

Kildare	2-13 (19) – (23) 1-20	Kilkenny

John Locke's Park, Callan
Referee: Adam Kinahan
