= 2006 Walsh Cup =

Tournament details
- Trophy: Walsh Cup

Winners
- Champions: Kilkenny (15th win)
- Manager: Brian Cody
- Captain: Michael Kavanagh

Runners-up
- Runners-up: Wexford
- Manager: Séamus Murphy

The 2006 Walsh Cup was a hurling competition played by the teams of Leinster and Ulster. 9 teams competed: 6 Leinster counties, 2 Ulster counties and one third-level college. Lower-level teams competed in the 2006 Kehoe Cup.

Kilkenny won.

== Results ==
=== Preliminary round ===
22 January 2006

| Westmeath | 2-14 – 1-11 | Down |

=== Quarter-finals ===
29 January 2006

| Laois | 2-23 – 2-25 (a.e.t.) | Kilkenny |

29 January 2006

| Wexford | 4-18 – 0-14 | Dublin |

Parnell Park
29 January 2006

| UCD | 1-13 – 1-11 (a.e.t.) | Westmeath |

29 January 2006

| Offaly | 2-26 – 1-16 | Antrim |

=== Semi-finals ===
11 February 2006

| Kilkenny | 2-15 – 0-11 | UCD |

5 February 2006

| Wexford | 3-14 – 2-16 | Offaly |

=== Final ===
11 February 2006

| Kilkenny | 1-18 – 1-12 | Wexford |
|---|---|---|
| | Report |

Nowlan Park, Kilkenny
