= 2008 Walsh Cup =

Tournament details
- Trophy: Walsh Cup

Winners
- Champions: Antrim (1st win)
- Manager: Terence McNaughton & Dominic McKinley
- Captain: Seán Delargy

Runners-up
- Runners-up: Offaly
- Manager: Joe Dooley
- Captain: Kevin Brady

The 2008 Walsh Cup was a hurling competition played by the teams of Leinster GAA and two teams from Ulster GAA. The competition differs from the Leinster Senior Hurling Championship as it also features further education colleges and it also featured two teams from Ulster. The first four losers of the competition entered the Walsh Shield.

Antrim won their first and (so far) only Walsh Cup, while Laois won the Walsh Shield.

== Walsh Cup ==
Preliminary round 13 January 2008
Westmeath	0-14
U.C.D.	2-15

Quarter-finals; 20 January 2008
U.C.D.	2-15
Dublin	0-13
Antrim	2-15
Kilkenny	1-17
Offaly	4-13
Down	2-12
Wexford	1-15
Laois	0-15

Semi-finals; 27 January 2008
U.C.D.	1-16
Antrim	3-14
Offaly	1-12
Wexford	0-11

Final; 3 February 2008
Antrim	3-12
Offaly	2-7

=== Preliminary round ===
13 January 2008

Westmeath	0-14 - 2-15	U.C.D.
	Report

Mullingar

=== Quarter-finals ===
20 January 2008

Dublin	0-13 - 2-15	U.C.D.
D O’Callaghan 0-5, P O’Boyle 0-3, D Curtin (0-2f) 0-2, P O’Driscoll, J McCaffrey, K Flynn 0-1 each.	Report	M Nolan 1-5 (0-4f), T Fitzgerald 1-1, S Nolan (0-1f), J Boland, E Power 0-2 each, B Murphy, PJ Nolan, C McBride 0-1 each.

Thomas Davis
20 January 2008

Kilkenny	1-17 - 2-15	Antrim
R Power 0-09, E McCormack 1-00, E Brennan, A Fogarty 0-02, PJ Delaney, J Ryall, R Mullally, R Hogan 0-01 each.	Report	L Watson 1-08, K McKeegan 1-01, R McGarry, K Elliot, N McManus, S McCrory, P McGill, K Stewart 0-01 each.

Freshford
20 January 2008

Offaly	4-13 - 2-12	Down
F Kerrigan 2-02, D Currams 1-01, S Dooley 0-4, J Brady 1-00, G Oakley, B Teehan 0-2 each, D Molloy, J Bergin 0-01 each.	Report	S Clarke 0-5, B Ennis 1-01, P Coulter 1-00, K McGarry 0-02, J Coyle, P Braniff, C Coulter 0-01 each.

Darver
20 January 2008

Wexford	1-15 - 0-15	Laois
R Jacob 0-10, D Redmond 1-00, W Doran 0-02, E Quigley, M Jacob, M Doyle 0-01 each.		J Young 0-08, Z Keenan 0-04, J Rowney 0-02, J Brophy 0-01.

Monamolin (Buffers Alley)

=== Semi-final ===
27 January 2008

Offaly	1-12 - 0-11	Wexford

Tullamore
January 2008

Antrim	3-14 - 1-16	U.C.D.

Belfield

=== Final ===
3 February 2008

Antrim	3-12 - 2-7	Offaly
	Report

Casement Park

== Walsh Shield ==
Kilkenny and Dublin declined to compete.

=== Semi-final ===
3 February 2008

Laois	2-18 - 0-16	Down

=== Final ===
2 March 2008

Laois	2-14 - 2-11	Westmeath
