= 2015 Walsh Cup =

Tournament details
- Year: 2015
- Trophy: Walsh Cup
- Sponsor: Bord na Móna

Winners
- Champions: Galway (2nd win)
- Manager: Anthony Cunningham
- Captain: David Collins

Runners-up
- Runners-up: Dublin
- Manager: Ger Cunningham

Other
- Top Scorer: Jason Flynn, Galway (2-30)

The 2015 Bord na Móna Walsh Cup was the 53rd staging of the Walsh Cup since its establishment in 1954.

== Fixtures and results ==
=== Group 1 ===
Kilkenny withdrew from the competition on 21 January 2015 following the death of Johnny Ryan. They hadn't yet played a game, leaving Carlow and NUIG to play off for a place in the semi-finals.

Pos	Team	Pld	W	D	L	SF	SA	Diff	Pts
1	Carlow	1	1	0	0	2-19	0-11	14	2
2	NUIG	1	0	0	1	0-11	2-19	-14	0
3	Kilkenny	Withdrew							

23 January 2015; 19:00; Group 1	Carlow	2-19 - 0-11	NUIG	Fenagh; Referee: John Keenan (Wicklow)

=== Group 2 ===
Pos	Team	Pld	W	D	L	SF	SA	Diff	Pts
1	Dublin	2	2	0	0	4-48	3-24	27	4
2	Antrim	2	1	0	1	3-34	2-40	-3	2
3	D.I.T.	2	0	0	2	3-24	5-42	-24	0

11 January 2015; 14:00; Group 2	Antrim	1-22 - 2-12	D.I.T.	St. Paul's, Belfast
11 January 2015; 14:00; Group 2	P Shiels (0-7, 0-5 frees); N McManus (0-5, 0-1 free); PJ O'Connell (1-2); C McCann (0-3); E McCloskey, M Bradley (0-2); B McFall (0-1)	Report	D McNicholas (1-3, 0-1 sideline); J Guiney (0-5 frees); D Roberts (1-2); J Henderson, A Nugent (0-1)	St. Paul's, Belfast

20 January 2015; 19:30; Group 2	Dublin	4-20 - 1-12	D.I.T.	Parnell Park; Referee: T Carroll (Offaly)
20 January 2015; 19:30; Group 2	Eamonn Dillon (1-6, 0-1 65); Liam Rushe (1-3); Paul Ryan (0-5, 0-1 frees, 0-2 65); Niall McMorrow, David Treacy (1-1); Conal Keaney (0-3); Cian Boland (0-1)	Report	Derek McNicholas (0-8, 0-6 frees); Michael Lee (1-2); Willie McGrath, Justin Cahill (0-1)	Parnell Park; Referee: T Carroll (Offaly)

25 January 2015; 14:00; Group 2	Dublin	0-28 - 2-12	Antrim	Parnell Park
25 January 2015; 14:00; Group 2	David Treacy (0-11, 0-7 frees); Danny Sutcliffe, Mark Schutte (0-5); David O’Callaghan, Cian Boland (0-2); Joey Boland, Shane Stapleton, John Hetherton (0-1)	Report	Eddie McCloskey, Ciaran Clarke (1-1); Neil McManus (0-4, 0-3 frees); Paul Shiels (0-2 frees); Matthew Donnelly, Conor McCann, Ciaran Johnson, Daniel McKernan (0-1)	Parnell Park

=== Group 3 ===
Pos	Team	Pld	W	D	L	SF	SA	Diff	Pts
1	Laois	2	2	0	0	6-40	2-27	25	4
2	Wexford	2	1	0	1	2-40	4-33	1	2
3	U.C.D.	2	0	0	2	1-23	3-43	-26	0

11 January 2015; 14:00; Group 3	Laois	2-22 - 1-8	U.C.D.	Abbeyleix; Referee: B Redmond (Wexford)
11 January 2015; 14:00; Group 3	Z Keenan (1-9, 0-5 frees); PJ Scully (1-3); T Fitzgerald (0-3); J Campion (0-2); J Fitzpatrick, C Stapleton, C Dwyer, D Palmer, N Foyle (0-1)	Report	C McDonald (1-5, 3frees); S Aylward (0-3 frees)	Abbeyleix; Referee: B Redmond (Wexford)

18 January 2015; 14:00; Group 3	Wexford	1-21 - 0-15	U.C.D.	Gorey; Referee: D Hickey (Carlow)
18 January 2015; 14:00; Group 3	J Kelly (1-6, 0-2 frees); I Byrne, C Shaughnessy (0-3); P Doran, S Tomkins (0-2); K Foley, L Chin, P Foley, R Kehoe, H Kehoe (0-1)	Report	R King (0-9, 0-5 frees); P Purcell, C McDonald (0-2); C Cronin, C MacGabhainn (0-1)	Gorey; Referee: D Hickey (Carlow)

25 January 2015; 14:00; Group 3	Laois	4-18 - 1-19	Wexford	Abbeyleix; Referee: Peter Burke (Kilkenny)
25 January 2015; 14:00; Group 3	PJ Scully (3-1); S Maher (1-6, 0-5 frees); W Hyland (0-4); N Foyle (0-2); M Whelan (0-2 frees); B Conroy, J Purcell, J Campion (0-1)	Report	P Morris (0-5, 0-4 frees); S Tomkins (0-4); K Foley (1-1); J Kelly (0-3); B Barron. I Byrne (0-2); D Waters, C O'Shaughnessy (0-1)	Abbeyleix; Referee: Peter Burke (Kilkenny)

=== Group 4 ===
Pos	Team	Pld	W	D	L	SF	SA	Diff	Pts
1	Galway	2	2	0	0	3-43	1-29	20	4
2	Offaly	2	1	0	1	3-28	3-35	-7	2
3	Westmeath	2	0	0	2	1-29	3-36	-13	0

11 January 2015; 14:00; Group 4	Offaly	2-15 - 1-13	Westmeath	Cusack Park, Mullingar; Referee: G Quilty (Kilkenny)
11 January 2015; 14:00; Group 4	S Quirke (2-0); S Dooley (0-5, 0-4 frees); E Nolan (0-4, 0-3 frees); T Carroll (0-3); S Ryan, S Kinsella, P Murphy (0-1)	Report	B Murtagh (1-7, 0-6 frees, 0-1 65), E Corrigan, N Dowdall (0-2), A Devine, C Boyle (0-1)	Cusack Park, Mullingar; Referee: G Quilty (Kilkenny)

18 January 2015; 14:00; Group 4	Galway	1-21 - 0-16	Westmeath	Cusack Park, Mullingar; Referee: Paud O'Dwyer (Carlow)
18 January 2015; 14:00; Group 4	Jason Flynn (1-12, 0-11 frees), Eanna Burke (0-4); Padraig Brehony (0-2); Joseph Cooney, Brian Molloy, Dean Higgins (0-1)	Report	Brendan Murtagh (0-10, 0-8 frees); Alan Devine (0-2), Emmet Corrigan, Niall Flanagan, Killian Murphy (0-1); Darragh Clinton (0-1 sideline)	Cusack Park, Mullingar; Referee: Paud O'Dwyer (Carlow)

25 January 2015; 14:00; Group 4	Galway	2-22 - 1-13	Offaly	O'Connor Park, Tullamore; Attendance: 1920; Referee: James McGrath (Westmeath)
25 January 2015; 14:00; Group 4	Jason Flynn (1-5, 0-4 frees); Dean Higgins (0-5, 0-1 '65); Joe Canning (1-0); Padraig Brehony (0-3); David Collins, Joseph Cooney, Andrew Smith, Jonathan Glynn (0-2); Eanna Burke (0-1)	Report	Shane Dooley (1-4, 0-2 frees); Stephen Quirke (0-4, 0-3 frees); Cillian Kiely (0-2); Sean Ryan, Garreth Mann, Shane Kinsella (0-1)	O'Connor Park, Tullamore; Attendance: 1920; Referee: James McGrath (Westmeath)

=== Semi-finals ===
1 February 2015; 14:00; Semi-final	Galway	2-18 - 0-15	Carlow	Dr Cullen Park, Carlow; Referee: Gavin Quilty (Kilkenny)
1 February 2015; 14:00; Semi-final	Dean Higgins (0-6, 0-4 frees); Padraig Brehony (1-2); Jonathan Glynn (1-1); Joseph Cooney (0-2); Jason Flynn (0-2 frees); James Regan, Eanna Burke, Gerard Kelly (0-1); Johnny Coen, Brian Molloy (0-1 free)	Report	Martin Kavanagh (0-9, 0-7 frees, 0-1 '65); Diarmuid Byrne, John Michael Nolan (0-2); Craig Wall, Seamus Murphy (0-1)	Dr Cullen Park, Carlow; Referee: Gavin Quilty (Kilkenny)

1 February 2015; 14:00; Semi-final	Dublin	2-18 - 1-11	Laois	O'Moore Park, Portlaoise; Referee: Patrick Murphy (Carlow)
1 February 2015; 14:00; Semi-final	David Treacy (0-9, 0-8 frees, 0-1 '65); Conal Keaney (1-03); Eamon Dillon (1-2, 0-1 free); Peter Kelly (0-2, 0-1 free), Cian McBride, Niall McMorrow (0-1)	Report	Zane Keenan (1-3, 1-0 penalty, 0-3 frees); Stephen Maher (0-2 frees); John Purcell, Tommy Fitzgerald, Willie Hyland; PJ Scully, Neil Foyle (0-1); Matthew Whelan (0-1 free)	O'Moore Park, Portlaoise; Referee: Patrick Murphy (Carlow)

=== Final ===
7 February 2015; 17:00; Final	Galway	1-22 - 1-20	Dublin	Croke Park; Referee: Sean Cleere (Kilkenny)
7 February 2015; 17:00; Final	Jason Flynn (0-11 frees); James Regan (1-4); Dean Higgins (0-2); Padraig Mannion, Joseph Cooney, Padraig Brehony, Brian Molloy, Colm Flynn (0-1)	Report	Paul Ryan (0-8, 0-6 frees); Liam Rushe (1-0); Joey Boland, Shane Stapleton, Mark Schutte, Danny Sutcliffe (0-02); Shane Barrett, Peter Kelly, Ben Quinn, Cian Boland (0-1)	Croke Park; Referee: Sean Cleere (Kilkenny)
