= 2011 Walsh Cup =

Tournament details
- Province: Leinster
- Year: 2011

Winners
- Champions: Dublin (5th win)
- Manager: Anthony Daly
- Captain: Liam Ryan

Runners-up
- Runners-up: Kilkenny
- Manager: Brian Cody
- Captain: T. J. Reid

The 2011 Walsh Cup was a hurling competition played by the teams of Leinster GAA, a team from Connacht GAA and a team from Ulster GAA. The competition differs from the Leinster Senior Hurling Championship as it also features further education colleges from both Leinster and Connacht and the winning team does not progress to another tournament at All-Ireland level. The four losers of the first round enter the Walsh Shield. The winners of the Walsh Cup were Dublin, who defeated Kilkenny in the final, and the winners of the Walsh Shield were Offaly, who defeated Carlow in a replay, following the abandonment on the initial fixture in extra time.

== Walsh Cup ==
First round 15/16 January 2011
NUI Galway	0-22
Offaly	1-10
Laois	0-24
UCD	2-14
DIT	2-18
Carlow	1-12
Antrim	3-12
Westmeath	2-11

Quarter-finals; 23 January 2011
NUI Galway	2-12
Kilkenny	3-16
Laois	0-24
Wexford	2-14
DIT	2-12
Galway	0-20
Antrim	0-12
Dublin	2-13

Semi-finals; 30 January 2011
Kilkenny	3-16
Laois	1-09
Galway	3-13
Dublin	1-20

Final; 27 February 2011
Kilkenny	2-13
Dublin	2-17

=== First round ===
16 January 2011

Westmeath	2-11 - 3-12	Antrim

Mullingar
16 January 2011

Carlow	1-12 - 2-18	DIT

Carlow
16 January 2011

Laois	0-24 - 2-14	UCD

Rathdowney
15 January 2011

Offaly	0-22 - 1-10	NUI Galway

Banagher

=== Quarter-finals ===
23 January 2011

Dublin	2-13 - 0-12	Antrim

Parnell Park, Dublin
23 January 2011

DIT	2-12 - 0-20	Galway

Ballinasloe
23 January 2011

Laois	0-24 - 2-14	Wexford

Rathdowney
23 January 2011

NUI Galway	2-12 - 3-16	Kilkenny

Galway

=== Semi-finals ===
30 January 2011

Dublin	1-20 - 3-13	Galway

Parnell Park, Dublin
30 January 2011

Kilkenny	3-16 - 1-09	Laois

Galway

=== Final ===
27 February 2011

Dublin	2-17 - 2-13	Kilkenny
C Clinton 1-4, R O’Dwyer 0-6 (0-4f), D Plunkett 1-1, S Ryan 0-3, J McCaffrey (0-1 ‘65’), L Ryan, D O’Dwyer 0-1 each.	Report	TJ Reid 1-6 (0-3f, 0-1 65), M Fennelly 1-0, A Fogarty 0-2, M Rice, J Fitzpatrick, J Mulhall, N Walsh, E Guinan 0-1 each.

Parnell Park, Dublin
Referee: B Gavin (Offaly)

== Walsh Shield ==
The Walsh Shield consists of the 4 losing teams from the first round of the Walsh Cup.

Semi-finals		Final
Westmeath	0-16
Carlow	2-13	Offaly	3-23
U.C.D.	0-12	Carlow	2-14
Offaly	0-23

=== Semi-finals ===
28 January 2011

Westmeath	0-16 - 2-13	Carlow

Mullingar
30 January 2011

UCD	0-12 - 0-23	Offaly

Banagher
