= 2016 Walsh Cup =

Tournament details
- Year: 2016
- Trophy: Walsh Cup
- Sponsor: Bord na Móna

Winners
- Champions: Dublin (7th win)
- Manager: Ger Cunningham
- Captain: Liam Rushe

Runners-up
- Runners-up: Wexford
- Manager: Liam Dunne

The 2016 Bord na Móna Walsh Cup was the 54th staging of the Walsh Cup since its establishment in 1954. Dublin were the winners.

== Format ==
15 teams compete: 10 county teams from Leinster, Ulster and Connacht (Kilkenny, Laois, Wexford, Galway, Offaly, Dublin, Meath, Carlow, Antrim, Westmeath) and five third-level colleges: UCD, DIT, NUI Galway, IT Carlow and DCU. Kilkenny fielded teams composed mainly of under 21 players managed by u21 manager Eddie Brennan.

The teams are drawn into four groups, one of three teams and three of four teams. Each team plays the other teams in its group once, earning 2 points for a win and 1 for a draw. The four group winners progress to the semi-finals.

== Fixtures/results ==
=== Group 1 ===
Pos	Team	Pld	W	D	L	SF	SA	Diff	Pts
1	Offaly	2	2	0	0	7-37	1-19	+36	4
2	Dublin Institute of Technology	2	1	0	1	4-24	4-44	–20	2
3	Kilkenny	2	0	0	2	1-25	7-23	–16	0

3 January 2016; Round 1	Offaly	4-28 - 0-10	Dublin Institute of Technology	O'Connor Park; Referee: S Cleere (Kilkenny)
3 January 2016; Round 1	J Mulrooney 3-4 (2f), S Dooley 0-10 (5f), S Quirke 0-4, S Cleary 1-1, P Murphy 0-3, C Egan and S Ryan 0-2 each, R Hughes and J Sampson 0-1 each.	Report	G Whelan and J Guiney (3f) 0-4 each, C McDonald and P O’Reilly 0-1 each.	O'Connor Park; Referee: S Cleere (Kilkenny)

13 January 2016; Round 2	Kilkenny	0-16 - 4-14	Dublin Institute of Technology	Kilkenny Training Centre; Attendance: 250; Referee: P Murphy
13 January 2016; Round 2	M Kenny (0-6 frees); C Ryan (0-3); B Ryan, G Tynan, E Brennan (0-2); S O'Farrell (0-1)	Report	C McDonald (2-4, 0-2 frees); J Guiney (1-2, 0-1 free); D McNicholas (0-5); C O'Donoghue (1-0); C Sheehan, J Sweeney, R Greville (0-1)	Kilkenny Training Centre; Attendance: 250; Referee: P Murphy

17 January 2016; Round 3	Offaly	3-9 – 1-9	Kilkenny	St. Brendan's Park; Attendance: 2,000; Referee: A Devine (Westmeath)
17 January 2016; Round 3	J Gorman (2-0); J Mulrooney (1-0); S Dooley (0-7, 6 frees, 1 65); J O’Connor, C Doughan (0-1 each).	Report	B Ryan (1-0); M Kenny, B Kennedy (both 0-2, frees); C Ryan, M Kelly, JJ Farrell (free), N Mullins, M Malone (0-1 each).	St. Brendan's Park; Attendance: 2,000; Referee: A Devine (Westmeath)

=== Group 2 ===
Pos	Team	Pld	W	D	L	SF	SA	Diff	Pts
1	Dublin	3	3	0	0	9-60	5-38	+44	6
2	Laois	3	2	0	1	5-45	3-56	–5	4
3	Antrim	3	1	0	2	3-56	7-54	-10	2
4	University College Dublin	3	0	0	3	4-41	6-54	-19	0

2 January 2016; Round 1	Laois	3-17 - 1-19	Antrim	Heywood Community School; Referee: P Burke (Kilkenny)
2 January 2016; Round 1	PJ Scully 1-6 (4f), B Reddin 0-4, T Dowling, B Conroy 1-0 each, M Whelan, P Purcell 0-2 each, E Fennelly, E Reilly, R Mullaney 0-1 each.	Report	C Johnson 1-6, C Clarke 0-4 (1f), L Watson 0-4f, O McFaddan, S McAfee, K McKernan, M Dudley, N McKenna 0-1 each.	Heywood Community School; Referee: P Burke (Kilkenny)

7 January 2016; Round 1	University College Dublin	3-12 - 4-15	Dublin	UCD Pitch
7 January 2016; Round 1	O O’Rorke 3-2 (1-1f), C Cronin 0-3, J O’Connor 0-2 (0-1f), P Guinan, C O’Callaghan, J Malone, J Griffin, J Maher 0-1 each.	Report	P Ryan 2-7 (0-5f), E Dillon 2-1, N McMorrow 0-3, F McGibb 0-2, C Mac Giolla Bhríde, R McBride 0-1 each.	UCD Pitch

10 January 2016; Round 2	Laois	1-19 - 0-17	University College Dublin	Heywood Community School; Referee: P Burke (Kilkenny)
10 January 2016; Round 2	PJ Scully 0-9 (7fs), E Fennelly 1-2, C Collier, B Reddin 0-2 each, M Whelan, C Stapleton, P Purcell, R Mullaney 0-1 each.	Report	O O'Rourke 0-11 (8fs), J Maher 0-2, P Guinan, C Devitt, H Lawlor, C McGabhann (f) 0-1 each.	Heywood Community School; Referee: P Burke (Kilkenny)

10 January 2016; Round 2	Dublin	3-25 - 1-17	Antrim	Parnell Park; Referee: P O'Dwyer (Carlow)
10 January 2016; Round 2	P Ryan 1-10 (0-7fs), E Dillon 1-3, S Reilly 1-1, N McMorrow 0-4, C Crummey, J McCaffrey 0-2 each, D Treacy, B Quinn, D O'Connell 0-1 each.	Report	L Watson 0-9 (7fs), E McCloskey 1-2, K McKernan 0-3, N McKenna, C Johnston, C Clarke 0-1 each.	Parnell Park; Referee: P O'Dwyer (Carlow)

16 January 2016; Round 3	Antrim	1-20 – 1-12	University College Dublin	The Dub, Belfast
16 January 2016; Round 3	L Watson 0-9, C Clarke 1-2, E McCloskey 0-3, K McKernan 0-3, M Bradley 0-2, D Hamill 0-1.	Report	O O'Rourke 1-5, J Maher 0-3, J O'Connor 0-2, P King 0-2.	The Dub, Belfast

17 January 2016; Round 3	Laois	1-9 – 2-20	Dublin	Kelly O'Daly Park; Referee: M O'Sullivan (Kilkenny)
17 January 2016; Round 3	PJ Scully (0-5), T Dowling (1-0), B Reddin (0-2), N Foyle (0-1), C Stapleton (0-1),	Report	NF McGibb (1-1), P Ryan (1-2), N McMorrow (0-4), E Dillon (0-3), C Crummy (0-2), C Bennett (0-2), L Rushe (0-1), C McBride (0-1), D O’Connell (0-1), D Tracey (0-1), S Treacy (0-1), M Schutte (0-1).	Kelly O'Daly Park; Referee: M O'Sullivan (Kilkenny)

=== Group 3 ===
Pos	Team	Pld	W	D	L	SF	SA	Diff	Pts
1	Wexford	3	3	0	0	6-56	3-27	38	6
2	I.T. Carlow	3	1	0	2	4-40	4-47	-7	2
3	Meath	3	1	0	2	5-36	4-49	-10	2
4	Carlow	3	1	0	2	0-40	4-49	-21	2

2 January 2016; Round 1	Wexford	2-17 - 1-13	I.T. Carlow	Bunclody GAA Grounds; Referee: J Keenan (Wicklow)
2 January 2016; Round 1	S Tomkins 1-3, C Dunbar 1-0, I Byrne 0-9 ( 6 frees), L Chin 0-2, A Shore, H Kehoe, P Morris 0-1 each.	Report	J Fagan 1-0; S Maher 0-9, 0-6 frees, 0-1, 65, C Dunford 0-2, M Kavanagh, C Dwyer 0-1 each.	Bunclody GAA Grounds; Referee: J Keenan (Wicklow)

3 January 2016; Round 1	Meath	1-13 - 0-19	Carlow	Páirc Tailteann; Referee: A Devine (Westmeath)
3 January 2016; Round 1	J Regan 1-9 (8f), J Toher, S Morris, J Andrews, C Fitzsimons 0-1 each.	Report	K McDonald 0-7 (5f, 1 '65), Sean Murphy 0-4, Seamus Murphy 0-3, C Wall 0-2, A Gleeson, D O'Neill, L Galway 0-1 each.	Páirc Tailteann; Referee: A Devine (Westmeath)

10 January 2016; Round 2	Meath	2-7 - 3-18	Wexford	Páirc Tailteann; Referee: D Hughes (Carlow)
10 January 2016; Round 2	S Brennan (1-2), J Toher (0-3 1 free), C Fitzsimons (1-0), K Keoghan (0-2).	Report	I Byrne (1-7, 5 frees, 1’65), H Kehoe (1- 1), B Carton (1-0), J O’Connor (0-3), P Morris, L Og McGovern (0-2 each), D Dunne, A Nolan, S Tomkins (0-1 each).	Páirc Tailteann; Referee: D Hughes (Carlow)

10 January 2016; Round 2	Carlow	0-14 - 2-15	I.T. Carlow	Netwatch Cullen Park; Referee: J Heffernan (Wexford)
10 January 2016; Round 2	K McDonald 0-4 (4f), Seamus Murphy 0-3, C Wall, G Coady 0-2 each, Sean Murphy, D English ('65), C Lawlor 0-1 each.	Report	S Maher 0-7 (4f), M Kavanagh 1-2, (0-1f), J Fagan 1-0, J Doyle 0-3, C Dwyer 0-2, M Harney 0-1.	Netwatch Cullen Park; Referee: J Heffernan (Wexford)

17 January 2016; Round 3	Carlow	0-7 - 1-21	Wexford	Netwatch Cullen Park; Referee: J Kennedy (Kilkenny)
17 January 2016; Round 3	K McDonald (2f), D English (2f) 0-2 each; S Whelan, J O'Hara (line ball), D O'Neill 0-1 each.	Report	S Tomkins (2f), P Morris (5f) 0-5 each; D Dunne 1-1; H Kehoe, A Nolan 0-2 each; D O'Keeffe, A Shore (f), L Óg McGovern, C Dunbar, B Carton, M O'Hanlon 0-1 each.	Netwatch Cullen Park; Referee: J Kennedy (Kilkenny)

17 January 2016; Round 3	Meath	2-16 - 1-12	I.T. Carlow	Dunganny; Referee: A Keating (Dublin)
17 January 2016; Round 3	S Clynch 1-3; J Regan 0-6 (5fs, 1 '65); K Keoghan 1-1; T Clarke 0-4; J Keena (f), J Toher 0-1 each.	Report	S Maher 0-6 (4fs); D Healy 1-1; K Kelly, C Bolger 0-2 each; J Doyle 0-1.	Dunganny; Referee: A Keating (Dublin)

=== Group 4 ===
Pos	Team	Pld	W	D	L	SF	SA	Diff	Pts
1	Galway	3	3	0	0	5-55	1-46	21	6
2	National University of Ireland, Galway	3	1	1	1	5-59	2-52	16	3
3	Westmeath	3	1	0	2	2-48	8-62	-32	2
4	Dublin City University	3	0	1	2	3-54	4-56	-5	1

3 January 2016; Round 1	Westmeath	2-20 - 2-17	Dublin City University	St. Loman's Lakepoint Park; Referee: T Carroll (Offaly)
3 January 2016; Round 1	B Murtagh 0-13 (12 frees), W Casserly 1-2, K Murphy 1-1, L Varley 0-2, Ciaran Doyle 0-1, N Dowdall 0-1.		S Gray 1-6 (1-5 frees, 0-1 '65), C Joyce 1-2, K Fitzgerald 0-3, P Foley 0-2, N O'Connor 0-1, D Barden 0-1, G Howard 0-1, D Sutcliffe 0-1.	St. Loman's Lakepoint Park; Referee: T Carroll (Offaly)

10 January 2016; 14:00; Round 1	Galway	1-16 - 0-17	Dublin City University	Duggan Park; Referee: James McGrath
10 January 2016; 14:00; Round 1	Canning 1-5 (0-1f, 2sidelines), E burke 0-4, Harte 0-2, Brehony, D burke, Smith, Flynn, McInerney 0-1 each		Gray 0-9 (0-8f), Sutcliffe 0-3, O'Connor 0-2, Staunton, Foley, Fitzgerald 0-1 each	Duggan Park; Referee: James McGrath

9 January 2016; 14:30; Round 2	Westmeath	0-11 - 3-27	National University of Ireland, Galway	St Loman's Lakepoint Park; Referee: T Carroll
9 January 2016; 14:30; Round 2	B Murtagh 0-4 (3f), L Varley 0-3 (3f), D Egerton, A Craig, D Kilcoyne, A Devine 0-1 each.		B Duggan 1-12 (7f, 1 '65'), C Whelan 1-2, A Helebert 1-1, P Mannion, N O'Brien 0-3 each, C Mannion, J Fox 0-2 each, J Hanbury, E Brannigan 0-1 each.	St Loman's Lakepoint Park; Referee: T Carroll

13 January 2016; 19:00; Round 2	Galway	1-21 - 1-12	National University of Ireland, Galway	Duggan Park; Referee: Tony Carroll
13 January 2016; 19:00; Round 2	Joe Canning (0-9, 0-7 frees, 0-1 sideline); Éanna Burke (0-5); Brian Molloy (1-2); Padraig Brehony (0-4); P Claffey (0-1)	Report	Bobby Duggan (1-9, 0-8 frees); Cathal Mannion, Gerard Forde, Kevin McHugo (0-1)	Duggan Park; Referee: Tony Carroll

17 January 2016; 14:00; Round 3	Westmeath	0-17 - 3-18	Galway	St. Loman's Lakepoint Park; Referee: D Hughes (Carlow)
17 January 2016; 14:00; Round 3	B Murtagh 0-9 (5f); N Dowdall, D Kilcoyne 0-2 each; W Casserly, L Varley (f), A Devine, L Cassidy 0-1 each.	Report	J Flynn 2-2 (1-0pen, 0-2f); N Burke 1-2; S Moloney 0-5 (2f); E Burke 0-4; G McInerney 0-2; A Harte, A Smith, D Glennon 0-1 each.	St. Loman's Lakepoint Park; Referee: D Hughes (Carlow)

17 January 2016; 14:00; Round 3	Dublin City University	1-20 - 1-20	National University of Ireland, Galway	St. Clare's; Referee: K Jones (Kildare)
17 January 2016; 14:00; Round 3	S Gray 0-11 (0-9f, 0-1 '65'); E McHugh 1-0; C Joyce 0-3; C Scally 0-2; P Foley (f), D Barden, N O'Connor, K Fitzgerald 0-1 each.	Report	A Helebert 0-7 (0-3f, 0-2 '65'); C Whelan 0-4 (0-1f); S Ward 1-0; P Mannion 0-3, N O'Brien, C Mannion, S Hynes, R Taylor, S Conlon, G Hennelly 0-1 each.	St. Clare's; Referee: K Jones (Kildare)

=== Semi-finals ===
24 January 2016; Semi-final	Dublin	1-28 - 1-19	Galway	Parnell Park; Referee: P O'Dwyer (Carlow)
24 January 2016; Semi-final	D Treacy 0-12 (5f, 2 ’65, 1 sideline), E Dillon 1-2, N McMorrow 0-4, D O’Callaghan 0-3, P Ryan 0-2 (1f), S Treacy, D Plunkett, C Bennett and S O’Reilly 0-1 each.	Report	David Burke 1-3, S Moloney 0-5 (4f), N Burke 0-3, E Burke and D Glennon 0-2 each, G McInerney, G Lally (f), J Flynn and A Smith 0-1 each.	Parnell Park; Referee: P O'Dwyer (Carlow)

24 January 2016; Semi-final	Wexford	0-14 - 0-6	Offaly	O'Kennedy Park; Referee: P Burke (Kilkenny)
24 January 2016; Semi-final	H Kehoe (7f) 0-9, S Tomkins 0-2, L Chin, A Nolan, D Dunne 0-1 each.	Report	S Dooley 0-5 frees, C Egan 0-1.	O'Kennedy Park; Referee: P Burke (Kilkenny)

=== Final ===
30 January 2016; 17:00; Final	Dublin	1-22 - 1-12	Wexford	Croke Park; Attendance: 30,107; Referee: J Keenan (Wicklow)
30 January 2016; 17:00; Final	P Ryan 0-10 (0-7f, 0-1’65), E Dillon 1-1, D O’Callaghan, D Treacy 0-3 each, N McMorrow, J McCaffrey, S Treacy, D Plunkett, F O R Broin 0-1 each.	Report	H Kehoe 0-6 (0-6f), L Óg McGovern 1-1, C Dunbar 0-2, A Shore, L Chin, S Tomkins 0-1 each.	Croke Park; Attendance: 30,107; Referee: J Keenan (Wicklow)

== Top scorers ==
Overall

Rank	Player	County	Tally	Total	Matches	Average
1	Paul Ryan	Dublin	4-31	43	5	8.50
2	Liam Watson	Antrim	0-31	31	3	10.33
3	Oisín O'Rourke	University College Dublin	4-18	30	3	10.00
4	Seán Gray	Dublin City University	1-26	29	3	9.66
5	Brendan Murtagh	Westmeath	0-28	28	3	9.66
6	Bobby Duggan	N.U.I. Galway	2-21	27	2	13.50
7	Eamon Dillon	Dublin	5-10	25	5	5.00
8	P. J. Scully	Laois	1-20	23	3	7.66
9	Harry Kehoe	Wexford	1-19	19	5	3.80
9	Stephen Maher	I.T. Carlow	0-22	22	3	7.33

Single game

Rank	Player	County	Tally	Total	Opposition
1	Bobby Duggan	N.U.I. Galway	1-12	15	Westmeath
2	Paul Ryan	Dublin	2-7	13	University College Dublin
2	Paul Ryan	Dublin	1-10	13	Antrim
2	Brendan Murtagh	Westmeath	0-13	13	Dublin City University
5	Jack Regan	Meath	1-9	12	Carlow
5	Bobby Duggan	N.U.I. Galway	1-9	12	Galway
5	David Treacy	Dublin	0-12	12	Galway
8	Oisín O'Rourke	University College Dublin	3-2	11	Dublin
8	Oisín O'Rourke	University College Dublin	0-11	11	Laois
8	Seán Gray	Dublin City University	0-11	11	N.U.I. Galway
