= 2022 Walsh Cup =

Gaelic games competition in Ireland

Tournament details
- Province: Leinster, Ulster, Connacht
- Year: 2022
- Sponsor: Bord na Móna
- Date: 9–29 January 2022
- Teams: 7
- Defending champions: Wexford

Winners
- Champions: Dublin (8th win)
- Manager: Mattie Kenny
- Captain: Eoghan O'Donnell

Runners-up
- Runners-up: Wexford
- Manager: Darragh Egan

Other
- Matches played: 10

The 2022 Walsh Cup was the early-season tier 1 inter-county hurling competition based in the Irish province of Leinster. Seven counties compete – five from Leinster, Galway from Connacht and Antrim from Ulster.

Seven other counties from Leinster competed in the tier 2 and tier 3 Leinster competitions – see 2022 Kehoe Cup and Shield.

It took place in January 2022. Dublin were the winners.

== Competition format ==
The teams are drawn into one group of four teams and one group of three teams. Each team plays the other teams in their group once, earning 2 points for a win and 1 for a draw. The group winners advance to the final.

== Fixtures and results ==
=== Group A ===
Pos	Team	Pld	W	D	L	PF	PA	PD	Pts	Qualification
1	Dublin	3	3	0	0	100	66	+34	6	Advance to final
2	Galway	3	2	0	1	70	77	−7	4	
3	Offaly	3	1	0	2	69	75	−6	2	
4	Antrim	3	0	0	3	65	86	−21	0	

Updated to match(es) played on 23 January 2022. Source: Leinster GAA

=== Group B ===
Pos	Team	Pld	W	D	L	PF	PA	PD	Pts	Qualification
1	Wexford	2	1	1	0	61	50	+11	3	Advance to final
2	Kilkenny	2	1	1	0	61	55	+6	3	
3	Laois	2	0	0	2	43	60	−17	0	

Updated to match(es) played on 22 January 2022. Source: Leinster GAA

=== Final ===
29 January 2022
17:30 GMT (UTC±0)
Final

Report

Dublin	2-29 (35) – (19) 0-19	Wexford
(HT: 2-14 — 0-9)

Croke Park, Dublin
Referee: Patrick Murphy (Carlow)
