= 2017 Walsh Cup =

Hurling competition in Ireland

Tournament details
- Year: 2017
- Trophy: Walsh Cup
- Sponsor: Bord na Móna

Winners
- Champions: Kilkenny (20th win)
- Manager: Brian Cody
- Captain: Richie Hogan

Runners-up
- Runners-up: Galway
- Manager: Micheál Donoghue

Other
- Player of the Year: Kieran Joyce

The 2017 Bord na Móna Walsh Cup was the 55th staging of the Walsh Cup since its establishment in 1954. Kilkenny won their 20th title after a 0-20 to 0-18 win against Galway in the final on 5 February.

== Format ==
16 teams competed: 11 county teams from Leinster, Ulster and Connacht (Antrim, Carlow, Dublin, Galway, Kildare, Kilkenny, Laois, Meath, Offaly, Westmeath and Wexford) and five third-level colleges (DCU Dóchas Éireann, DIT, IT Carlow, NUI Galway and UCD).

Group Stage

The teams are drawn into four groups of four teams. Each team plays the other teams in its group once, earning 2 points for a win and 1 for a draw.

Knockout Stage

The four group winners progress to the semi-finals.

== Group stage ==
=== Group 1 ===
Pos	Team	Pld	W	D	L	SF	SA	Diff	Pts
1	Galway	3	3	0	0	3-69	0-41	37	6
2	Laois	3	2	0	1	7-61	2-58	18	4
3	National University of Ireland, Galway	3	1	0	2	1-59	4-56	-6	2
4	Dublin Institute of Technology	3	0	0	3	1-47	6-81	-49	0

8 January 2017; 14:00; Round 1	Galway	1-30 – 0-12	Dublin Institute of Technology	Duggan Park, Ballinasloe; Referee: A Devine (Westmeath)
8 January 2017; 14:00; Round 1	J Flynn 0-7 (0-4 frees); J Cooney (1-2); T Monaghan, D Glennon (0-4); B Molloy, D Nevin (0-3); P Brehony (0-2); J Grealish, S McInerney, E Niland, C Salmon, J Coen (0-1)	Report	C O’Donoghue (0-6, 0-5 frees); D McNicholas (0-2, 0-1 free); R Greville, A Nugent, C Hayes (0-1); E O’Hehir (0-1 free)	Duggan Park, Ballinasloe; Referee: A Devine (Westmeath)

8 January 2017; 14:00; Round 1	Laois	3-18 – 0-22	National University of Ireland, Galway	Rathdowney; Referee: G Quilty (Kilkenny)
8 January 2017; 14:00; Round 1	PJ Scully (0-12, 0-5 frees); W Dunphy (1-2); R King (1-1); B Conroy (1-0); A Corby, S Downey, P Purcell (0-1)	Report	A Helebert (0-10, 0-7 frees), S Conlon (0-3); I Fox, G Forde (0-2); C Ryan, C Cleary, G Hennelly, S Barrett, J Commins (0-1)	Rathdowney; Referee: G Quilty (Kilkenny)

12 January 2017; 19:30; Round 2	Galway	1-20 – 0-13	National University of Ireland, Galway	Duggan Park, Ballinasloe; Referee: Michael Murtagh (Westmeath)
12 January 2017; 19:30; Round 2	Dan Nevin (0-9, 0-6 frees); Sean McInerney (1-3); Davey Glennon (0-3); Sean Loftus, Jason Flynn, Thomas Monaghan, Evan Niland, Jack Coyne (0-1)	Report	Ger Hennelly (0-5, 0-4 frees); Conor Cleary (0-3 frees); Ian Fox (0-2); Aiden Helebert, Gearoid Loughnane, Conor Ryan (0-1)	Duggan Park, Ballinasloe; Referee: Michael Murtagh (Westmeath)

15 January 2017; 14:00; Round 2	Laois	4-27 – 1-17	Dublin Institute of Technology	Rathdowney; Referee: J McGrath (Westmeath)
15 January 2017; 14:00; Round 2	P Whelan (2-3); N Foyle (1-4, 0-2 frees); W Dunphy (0-5); B Conroy (0-5, 0-3 frees); A Dunphy (0-4); P Keating (1-1); E Lyons (0-2), A Corby, L Bergin, S Dunphy (0-1)	Report	C O'Donoghue (0-6 frees); C Hayes (1-1); J Cahill (0-3); D McNicholas (0-2 frees); S Goff, D O'Connor, N Walsh, R Greville, T Doyle (0-1)	Rathdowney; Referee: J McGrath (Westmeath)

18 January 2017; 19:30; Round 3	National University of Ireland, Galway	1-24 – 0-18	Dublin Institute of Technology	Abbottstown; Referee: S Stack (Dublin)
18 January 2017; 19:30; Round 3	K McHugo (1-4); G Hennelly (0-6, 0-2 frees); A Helebert (0-5. 0-1 free); I Fox, S Hynes, G Loughnane (0-2); C Cleary (0-1 '65); S Conlon, P McCrann (0-1)	Report	C O'Donoghue (0-8, 0-5 frees); A Nugent (0-3); B Maher (0-2); J Guiney, N Walsh, S Keating, E O'Hehir, S McClelland (0-1)	Abbottstown; Referee: S Stack (Dublin)

22 January 2017; 14:00; Round 3	Galway	1-19 – 0-16	Laois	Rathdowney; Referee: S Cleere (Kilkenny)
22 January 2017; 14:00; Round 3	D Nevin (0-13, 0-10 frees, 0-1 '65); J Cooney (1-2); J Flynn, S McInerney (0-2)	Report	B Conroy (0-6, 0-4 frees, 0-1 '65); N Foyle (0-6, 0-5 frees); R Mullaney, W Dunphy, A Corby, R King (0-1)	Rathdowney; Referee: S Cleere (Kilkenny)

=== Group 2 ===
Pos	Team	Pld	W	D	L	SF	SA	Diff	Pts
1	Kilkenny	3	3	0	0	10-66	0-49	+47	6
2	Antrim	3	2	0	1	7-54	7-61	–7	4
3	Westmeath	3	1	0	2	1-44	5-49	–17	2
4	DCU Dóchas Éireann	3	0	0	3	1-47	7-52	–23	0

5 January 2017; 19:30; Round 1	Kilkenny	0-21 – 0-12	DCU Dóchas Éireann	MW Hire Park Dunmore; Referee: J Heffernan (Wexford)
5 January 2017; 19:30; Round 1	K Farrell (0-5 frees); J Bergin (0-4, 0-2 frees); S Buggy (0-3); T Walsh (0-2 frees); R Leahy, P Lyng (0-2), J Donnelly, S O’Farrell, A Burke (0-1)	Report	P Hogan (0-7, 0-6 frees); J O’Connor (0-2); P Foley, R McBride, E McHugh (0-1)	MW Hire Park Dunmore; Referee: J Heffernan (Wexford)

8 January 2017; 14:00; Round 1	Antrim	1-18 – 0-12	Westmeath	Kinnegad
8 January 2017; 14:00; Round 1	C Clarke (1-3, 0-3 frees); C Johnston (0-4); N McKenna, E Campbell (0-3); D McKernan, N McManus (0-2); M Connolly (0-1)	Report	A Devine (0-7, 0-4 frees); J Galvin (0-2); A Clarke, D Egerton, B Murtagh (0-1)	Kinnegad

15 January 2017; 14:00; Round 2	Kilkenny	6-27 – 0-19	Antrim	Abbottstown; Referee: Paud O'Dwyer (Carlow)
15 January 2017; 14:00; Round 2	TJ Reid (0-14, 0-10 frees, 0-2 65's); J Farrell (2-1); R Hogan (1-4); R Leahy (2-0); C Martin, P Lyng (0-3); O Walsh (1-0); W Walsh (0-2)	Report	C Clarke (0-8, 0-6 frees); N McKenna (0-5); C McKinley (0-2); N McManus, J Dillon, Conor Johnston, D Murphy (0-1)	Abbottstown; Referee: Paud O'Dwyer (Carlow)

15 January 2017; 14:00; Round 2	Westmeath	1-14 – 0-13	DCU Dóchas Éireann	Kinnegad; Referee: D Hughes (Carlow)
15 January 2017; 14:00; Round 2	A Devine (0-6, 0-2 frees); J Galvin (1-2); D Clinton (0-2); J Boyle, E Price, N Mitchell, P Lynam (0-1)	Report	R McBride (0-7, 0-1 free); K Doyle (0-3 frees); P Foley, J O'Connor, L Fahey (0-1)	Kinnegad; Referee: D Hughes (Carlow)

22 January 2017; 14:00; Round 3	Kilkenny	4-18 – 0-18	Westmeath	TEG Cusack Park; Referee: J Keenan (Wicklow)
22 January 2017; 14:00; Round 3	TJ Reid (0-7, 0-4 frees, 0-1 '65); W Walsh (2-3); J Farrell (2-2); P Lyng (0-3); C Martin, S Morrissey, L Ryan (0-1)	Report	A Devine (0-9, 0-6 frees); A Craig (0-2), B Murtagh (0-4); N Mitchell, E Price, D Clinton (0-1)	TEG Cusack Park; Referee: J Keenan (Wicklow)

22 January 2017; 14:00; Round 3	Antrim	6-17 – 1-22	DCU Dóchas Éireann	Jordanstown; Referee: K Brady (Louth)
22 January 2017; 14:00; Round 3	N McManus (4-2); C McCann, C Johnston (1-2); C Clarke (0-2, 0-1 free); D Murphy (0-2); S McCrory, C McKinley, E Campbell, J Dillon, P Shiels, P McGill (0-1)	Report	C Currie (1-6, 0-3 frees); P Kelly, C Dowling (0-4); T French, C Hearne (0-2); B Crowdle, A Murphy, H O'Connor, J Mulally (0-1)	Jordanstown; Referee: K Brady (Louth)

=== Group 3 ===
Pos	Team	Pld	W	D	L	SF	SA	Diff	Pts
1	Wexford	3	3	0	0	9-68	1-41	+53	6
2	Dublin	3	2	0	1	4-60	2-51	+15	4
3	University College Dublin	3	1	0	2	4-44	8-75	–43	2
4	Carlow	3	0	0	3	2-45	8-52	–25	0

4 January 2017; 19:30; Round 1	Dublin	2-17 – 1-13	Carlow	Parnell Park
4 January 2017; 19:30; Round 1	D Burke (0-5 frees); D Fox (0-4 frees); A Quinn (1-1); C O'Sullivan (1-0); F Magibb (0-2, 0-1 sideline); S McGrath, C Burke, C Maher, F Whitely, B Quinn (0-1)	Report	D Murphy (0-9, 0-8 frees, 0-1 '65), C Nolan (1-0); P Coady (0-3); J Nolan (0-1)	Parnell Park

8 January 2017; 12:45; Round 1	Wexford	5-31 – 1-8	University College Dublin	Pairc Ui Suiochan, Gorey
8 January 2017; 12:45; Round 1	C McDonald (0-9, 0-7 frees, 0-1 '65); B Carton (1-5); P Morris (1-2); R Kehoe, H Kehoe, C Dunbar (1-1); L Chin, E Martin (0-3), D Redmond (0-2); D O'Keeffe, S O'Gorman, K Foley, A Nolan (0-1)	Report	D Dolan (1-1); L Scanlon, J Murphy, C O'Shea (0-2); G Cullin (0-1 free)	Pairc Ui Suiochan, Gorey

11 January 2017; 18:30; Round 2	Dublin	2-26 – 0-21	University College Dublin	Parnell Park; Referee: K Brady (Louth)
11 January 2017; 18:30; Round 2	D Burke (1-10, 0-6 frees, 1-0 penalty); C O'Sullivan (1-1); A Quinn, C Conway, B Quinn, N McMorrow (0-3); C Crummey, F MacGib (0-1)	Report	DJ Foran (0-11, 0-8 frees), O O'Rorke (0-4, 0-1 free); D Dolan (0-3); P Guinan (0-2); C MacGabhann (0-1)	Parnell Park; Referee: K Brady (Louth)

15 January 2017; 14:00; Round 2	Wexford	3-20 – 0-14	Carlow	Netwatch Cullen Park Carlow; Referee: M O'Sullivan (Kilkenny)
15 January 2017; 14:00; Round 2	P Morris (2-3); C McDonald (0-6, 0-5 frees); L Chin (0-3, 0-1 free); P Doran (1-2, 0-1 free); D O'Keeffe (0-2); S Donoghue, H Kehoe, C Dunbar, A Nolan (0-1)	Report	D Murphy (0-5 frees); E Byrne, P Coady (0-2); K McDonald (0-2 frees); S Murphy, S Whelan, C Wall (0-1)	Netwatch Cullen Park Carlow; Referee: M O'Sullivan (Kilkenny)

18 January 2017; 19:45; Round 3	University College Dublin	3-15 – 1-18	Carlow	Netwatch Cullen Park Carlow; Referee: G McGrath (Westmeath)
18 January 2017; 19:45; Round 3	P Coady (0-10 frees); C Nolan (1-2); E Byrne (0-2); S Murphy, R Smithers, J Murphy, C Wall (0-1)	Report	O O'Rorke (2-7, 0-6 frees, 0-1 '65); T Phelan (1-0); C Keane (0-3, 0-1 free); H Lawlor, C Buckley, C O'Shea, R McEvoy (0-1); J O'Connor (0-1 '65)	Netwatch Cullen Park Carlow; Referee: G McGrath (Westmeath)

19 January 2017; 19:30; Round 3	Wexford	1-17 – 0-17	Dublin	Hollymount (Shelmaliers GAA); Referee: P Burke (Kilkenny)
19 January 2017; 19:30; Round 3	P Doran (1-2); C McDonald (0-5); L Chin (0-5, 0-3 frees); P Morris (0-3); B Carton, R Kehoe (0-1)	Report	N McMorow (0-6, 0-2 frees); C Conay, C Crummy (0-3); C Bennett (0-3, 0-2 frees); D Fox (0-2, 0-1 free)	Hollymount (Shelmaliers GAA); Referee: P Burke (Kilkenny)

=== Group 4 ===
Pos	Team	Pld	W	D	L	SF	SA	Diff	Pts
1	I.T. Carlow	3	2	1	0	8-58	9-45	+10	5
2	Offaly	3	2	1	0	8-48	4-53	+7	5
3	Meath	3	1	0	2	7-46	8-48	–5	2
4	Kildare	3	0	0	3	5-52	7-58	–12	0

8 January 2017; 14:00; Round 1	Offaly	3-12 – 2-10	Meath	Trim; Referee: Gearoid McGrath (Wexford)
8 January 2017; 14:00; Round 1	Shane Dooley (0-6, 0-3 frees); Oisin Kelly (2-1); Sean Cleary (1-1); Sean Gardiner (0-2); David King, Conor Molloy (0-1)	Report	Sean Quigley (1-4, 1-1 frees); James Toher (0-5, 0-4 frees); Luke Martyn (1-0); Shane Whitty (0-1)	Trim; Referee: Gearoid McGrath (Wexford)

8 January 2017; 14:00; Round 1	I.T. Carlow	4-17 – 2-14	Kildare	St Conleth's College; Referee: A Keating (Dublin)
8 January 2017; 14:00; Round 1	S Maher (1-7, 0-7 frees); M Kavanagh (2-1); J Fitzpatrick (1-1); C Dwyer (0-3); K Kelly (0-2); T Marr, C Dunford, J Doyle (0-1)	Report	M Delaney (0-7, 0-6 frees); P Divilly (1-2); B Byrne (0-2); R Ryan (1-0); S Gainey, J Sheridan, P Moran (0-1)	St Conleth's College; Referee: A Keating (Dublin)

15 January 2017; 14:00; Round 2	Offaly	3-14 – 0-23	I.T. Carlow	Birr; Referee: C Daly (Kildare)
15 January 2017; 14:00; Round 2	O Kelly (2-1); S Dooley (0-6, 0-5 frees, 0-1 '65); S Cleary (1-1); D King (0-2); S Gardiner, C Kiely, A Treacy, P Geraghty (0-1)	Report	M Kavanagh (0-8, 0-6 frees, 0-1 '65); K Kelly, T Nolan (0-4); C Bolger (0-3); A Mortimer, J Fitzpatrick S Casey (0-1); E Rowland (0-1 free)	Birr; Referee: C Daly (Kildare)

15 January 2017; 14:00; Round 2	Meath	1-19 – 1-18	Kildare	Páirc Tailteann Navan; Referee: Michael Murtagh (Westmeath)
15 January 2017; 14:00; Round 2	James Toher (0-11); Mark O'Sullivan (1-0); Peter Farrell (0-2); Joey Kenna; Anthony Forde; Sean Quigley; James Kelly, Kevin Keena, David Reilly (0-1)	Report		Páirc Tailteann Navan; Referee: Michael Murtagh (Westmeath)

18 January 2017; 19:30; Round 3	I.T. Carlow	4-18 – 4-17	Meath	Dunganny; Referee: A Devine (Westmeath)
18 January 2017; 19:30; Round 3	C Dwyer, C Bolger (1-4); S Maher (0-6, 2 frees); A Mortimer (1-2); M O'Hanlon (1-0 free); S Phelan, M Kavanagh (0-1)	Report	K Keena, S Clynch (1-3); J Toher (0-5); J McCloskey (1-2); N Heffernan (1-0); K Keoghan, J Kelly, S Quigley, P Keogh (0-1)	Dunganny; Referee: A Devine (Westmeath)

22 January 2017; 14:00; Round 3	Offaly	2-22 – 2-20	Kildare	Hawkfield; Referee: J Heffernan (Wexford)
22 January 2017; 14:00; Round 3	S Dooley (0-10, 0-8 frees, 0-1 '65); S Cleary (2-2); S Ryan, P Murphy (0-2); O Kelly, E Nolan (0-2); D Maloney, E Cahill (0-1)	Report	M Delaney (2-4, 0-3 frees); D Reidy (0-9 frees); J Mulhall (0-3), J Sheridan, B Byrne (0-2)	Hawkfield; Referee: J Heffernan (Wexford)

== Knockout stage ==
=== Semi-finals ===
28 January 2017; 14:00; Semi-final	Galway	4-37 – 0-15	I.T. Carlow	Pearse Stadium, Salthill; Referee: A Devine (Westmeath)
28 January 2017; 14:00; Semi-final	S Moloney (0-9, 0-2 frees, 0-1 '65); J Flynn (1-6, 0-4 frees); S McInerney (2-3); C Whelan (1-1); A Helebert (0-4); J Cooney, A Tuohy (0-3); D Nevin (0-2, 0-1 free); C Salmon, T Monaghan, Greg Lally, S Loftus, K McHugo, D Glennon (0-1)	Report	M O’Hanlon (0-8, 0-6 frees); C Bolger (0-2); E Rowland (0-2 frees); D Tobin, S Casey, S Phelan (0-1)	Pearse Stadium, Salthill; Referee: A Devine (Westmeath)

29 January 2017; 14:00; Semi-final	Kilkenny	0-15 – 0-14	Wexford	O'Kennedy Park, New Ross
29 January 2017; 14:00; Semi-final	Alan Murphy (0-10 frees); Pat Lyng (0-2); Cillian Buckley, Conor Martin, Paddy Deegan (0-1)	Report	Lee Chin (0-9, 0-8 frees); Joe O'Connor (0-2, 0-1 sideline); Eoin Moore, Matthew O'Hanlon, Podge Doran (0-1)	O'Kennedy Park, New Ross

=== Final ===
5 February 2017; Final	Kilkenny	0-20 – 0-18	Galway	Nowlan Park, Kilkenny; Referee: P. Murphy (Carlow)
5 February 2017; Final	Richie Hogan (0-11, 0-7 frees, 0-2 '65s); Ollie Walsh (0-3); Lester Ryan (0-2); Conor Martin, Pat Lyng, Conor Fogarty, Kieran Joyce (0-1)	Report	Jason Flynn (0-6, 0-5 frees); Joseph Cooney, Davy Glennon (0-2); Shane Maloney (0-2, 0-1 free); Johnny Coen, Aidan Harte, Colm Callanan, Sean McInerney (0-1)	Nowlan Park, Kilkenny; Referee: P. Murphy (Carlow)
