= 2009 Walsh Cup =

Tournament details
- Province: Leinster
- Year: 2009
- Trophy: Walsh Cup

Winners
- Champions: Kilkenny (16th win)
- Manager: Brian Cody
- Captain: J. J. Delaney

Runners-up
- Runners-up: Wexford
- Manager: John McIntyre (hurler)
- Captain: Richie Cummins

The 2009 Walsh Cup was a hurling competition played by the teams of Leinster GAA, a team from Connacht GAA and a team from Ulster GAA. The competition differs from the Leinster Senior Hurling Championship as it also features further education colleges and the winning team does not progress to another tournament at All-Ireland level. The first four losers of the competition entered the Walsh Shield.

== Walsh Cup ==
Quarter-finals; 18 January 2009		Semi-finals; 25 January 2009		Final; 1 February 2009
Kilkenny	6-12
Dublin	0-12	Kilkenny	1-20
Antrim	1-13	Antrim	2-12
Laois	0-14			Kilkenny	2-17
Wexford	0-20			Galway	1-18
U.C.D.	1-15	Wexford	4-09
Galway	1-17	Galway	1-21
Offaly	2-10

=== Quarter-finals ===
The quarter finals saw Kilkenny, Antrim, Galway and Wexford proceed to the next round, while Dublin, Laois, Wexford and Offaly were left to contest the Walsh Shield.

18 January 2009

Kilkenny	6-12 - 0-12	Dublin

Parnell Park
18 January 2009

Antrim	1-13 - 0-14	Laois

Rathdowney
18 January 2009

Wexford	0-20 - 1-15	U.C.D.

Ferns
18 January 2009

Galway	1-17 - 2-10	Offaly

O'Connor Park

=== Semi-finals ===
The semi finals saw Kilkenny playing the previous year's winners, Antrim, while Galway faced Wexford. Both Kilkenny and Galway progressed to meet in the final.

25 January 2009

Kilkenny	1-20 - 2-12	Antrim

Casement Park
25 January 2009

Wexford	4-09 - 1-21	Galway

New Ross

=== Final ===
1 February 2008

Kilkenny	2-17 - 1-18 A.E.T.	Galway
	Report

Freshford

== Walsh Shield ==
The Walsh Shield was created in 2008 and was contested for the second time in 2009. It consisted of the losing quarter finalists of the Walsh Cup, with Dublin coming through to win for the first time.

Semi-finals; 25 January 2009		Final; 1 February 2009
Dublin	6-12
Laois	0-12	Dublin	1-20
Offaly	3-15	Offaly	2-15
U.C.D.	1-10
