= 2012 Walsh Cup =

Tournament details
- Province: Leinster
- Year: 2012

Winners
- Champions: Kilkenny (18th win)
- Manager: Brian Cody
- Captain: Eoin Larkin

Runners-up
- Runners-up: Galway
- Manager: Anthony Cunningham
- Captain: Fergal Moore

The 2012 Walsh Cup is a hurling competition played by the teams of Leinster GAA and a team from Connacht GAA. The competition differs from the Leinster Senior Hurling Championship as it also features further education colleges from both Leinster and Connacht and the winning team does not progress to another tournament at All-Ireland level. The four losers of the first round enter the Walsh Shield. Kilkenny won the final in Pearse Stadium defeating Galway by 2-20 to 1-14.

== Walsh Cup ==
First round 22 January 2012
Carlow	0-10
UCD	2-13
Laois	3-13
DIT	2-14
Wexford	0-13
N.U.I.G.	1-11

Quarter-finals; 22/29 January 2012
U.C.D.	1-08
Galway	6-25
Laois	2-13
Dublin	1-14
N.U.I.G.	0-12
Kilkenny	0-13
Westmeath	2-13
Offaly	0-12

Semi-finals; 5 February 2012
Galway	2-19
Laois	0-11
Kilkenny	1-23
Westmeath	1-16

Final; 12 February 2012
Galway	1-14
Kilkenny	2-20

=== First round ===
20 January 2012

Carlow	0-10 - 2-13	U.C.D.

Carlow I.T., Carlow
21 January 2012

Laois	3-13 - 2-14	D.I.T.

Rathdowney
21 January 2012

Wexford	0-13 - 1-11	N.U.I.G.

Belfield, Dublin

=== Quarter-finals ===
29 January 2012

U.C.D.	1-08 - 6-25	Galway

Belfield, Dublin
29 January 2012

Laois	2-14 - 1-14	Dublin

Portlaoise
29 January 2012

N.U.I.G.	0-12 - 0-13	Kilkenny

Freshford
22 January 2011

Westmeath	2-13 - 0-12	Offaly

Kinnegad

=== Semi-finals ===
5 February 2012

Galway	2-19 - 0-11	Laois

Ballinasloe
5 February 2012

Kilkenny	1-23 - 1-16	Westmeath

Castlecomer

=== Final ===
12 February 2012

Galway	1-14 - 2-20	Kilkenny

Pearse Stadium, Galway

== Walsh Shield ==
The Walsh Shield consists of the 4 losing teams from the first round of the Walsh Cup.

Semi-finals		Final
Carlow	0-15
D.I.T.	1-15	Offaly	0-22
Wexford	1-15	D.I.T.	1-14
Offaly	2-18

=== Semi-finals ===
29 January 2012

Carlow	0-15 - 1-15	D.I.T.

Carlow
29 January 2012

Wexford	1-15 - 2-18	Offaly

Wexford Park, Wexford

=== Final ===
5 February 2012

D.I.T.	1-14 - 0-22	Offaly

Tullamore
