= Richie Kehoe =

Irish hurler

Personal information
- Native name: Risteard Mac Eochaidh (Irish)
- Nickname: Richie
- Born: 9 March 1986 (age 40) Wexford, Ireland
- Height: 6 ft 2 in (188 cm)

Sport
- Sport: Hurling
- Position: Right half back
Club
- Years: Club
- Faythe Harriers
Club titles
- Wexford titles: 0
Inter-county*
Years	County	Apps (scores)
2006-present	Wexford	17 (1-3)
Inter-county titles
- Leinster titles: 0
- All-Irelands: 0
- NHL: 0
- All Stars: 0
- *Inter County team apps and scores correct as of 19:33, 9 January 2013.

Richard "Richie" Kehoe (born 9 March 1986) is an Irish sportsperson. He plays hurling with his local club Faythe Harriers and plays for the Wexford inter-county team.

== Playing career ==
=== Club ===
Kehoe plays hurling with his local club Faythe Harriers.

=== Inter-county ===
Kehoe first came to prominence on the inter-county scene as a member of the Wexford minor team in 2002. He however had very little success during that. He later joined the U21 team the year after where he remained for two years. 2006 saw Kehoe being called to the senior team while he was still playing in the U21 team but the senior turned out to be a poor year as they were defeated heavily by Kilkenny and later by Clare.
