= 2014 Walsh Cup =

Tournament details
- Year: 2014
- Trophy: Walsh Cup
- Sponsor: Bord na Móna
- Date: 11 January - 1 February 2014
- Teams: 12

Winners
- Champions: Kilkenny
- Manager: Brian Cody
- Captain: Lester Ryan

Runners-up
- Runners-up: Dublin
- Manager: Anthony Daly
- Captain: John McCaffrey

Other
- Matches played: 11
- Total scored: 31

The 2014 Bord na Móna Walsh Cup was the 52nd staging of the Walsh Cup since its establishment in 1954. Kilkenny beat Dublin by 0-24 to 1-7 to claim their 19th Walsh Cup title.

== Fixtures ==
=== Preliminary round ===
- Offaly 1-17 Antrim 0-14 - 11 January
- NUI Galway 1-17 Laois 1-14 - 12 January
- UCD 1-11 Carlow 0-13 - 12 January
- DIT 3-17 Westmeath 4-12 - 12 January

=== Quarter-finals ===
- Wexford 4-22 NUI Galway 0-07 -18 January
- Galway 1-14 Offaly 1-13 - 19 January
- Kilkenny 5-23 DIT 1-09 - 19 January
- Dublin 2-20 UCD 2-15 - 21 January

=== Semi-finals ===
- Dublin 1-15 Wexford 1-14 - 26 January
- Kilkenny 1-24 Galway 0-15 - 26 January

=== Final ===
1 February
17:00
Final

Kilkenny	0-24 - 1-17	Dublin
E Larkin 0-11 (0-9f, 0-1 65), J Brennan 0-4, P Walsh 0-1, M Kelly 0-1, T Breen 0-2, C Fennelly 0-3, A Fogarty 0-2	Report	M Schutte 0-6, P Ryan 1-4 (1-3f), D O’Callaghan 0-2, D Sutcliffe 0-1, E Dillon 0-1 (0-1f), J Boland 0-1 (0-1f), M Quilty 0-1, A Nolan 0-1 (0-1f)

Croke Park
Referee: D Hughes (Carlow)
