= Walsh Cup (hurling) =

Annual hurling competition in Ireland

- Current season or competition: 2027 Walsh Cup
- Irish: Corn Bhreatnach
- Code: Hurling
- Founded: 1954
- Region: Leinster, Connacht, Ulster (GAA)
- Trophy: Thomas Walsh Memorial Cup
- No. of teams: 10 (2026)
- Title holders: Galway (5th title)
- First winner: Wexford
- Most titles: Kilkenny (20 titles)

The Walsh Cup (Irish: Corn Bhreatnach) is an annual hurling competition staged in Ireland by the Leinster Council of the Gaelic Athletic Association (GAA) since 1954. Contested by the top county teams from the provinces of Leinster, Ulster and Connacht, the tournament consists of a round-robin group stage, followed by a knockout stage. Formerly sponsored by Bord na Móna, it was known as the "Bord na Móna Walsh Cup" and is now the "Dioralyte Walsh Cup" since 2024. Prior to 2018, third-level colleges also competed.

The Walsh Cup is part of a series of GAA tournaments known as the Leinster GAA Series, along with the Kehoe Cup (second-tier hurling teams) and the O'Byrne Cup (Gaelic football). The money generated by these competitions helps address hardship suffered by players and ordinary members of the GAA in Leinster. This scheme is the only one of its kind offered by a provincial GAA council. Apart from this, the competitions provide an opportunity for the county teams to prepare for the upcoming National Hurling League.

Eight teams currently participate in the Walsh Cup, most of which are from the province of Leinster; some county teams from Ulster and Connacht also compete. The tournament has been won at least once by nine different teams, six of which have won the title more than once. The all-time record-holders are Kilkenny, who have won the competition 20 times.

== History ==
In 1954, the Leinster Council established a new inter-county football and hurling tournament in an effort to raise funds to supplement the medical bills of players who were in financial difficulty. This scheme, known as the Players' Injury Fund, was the first of its kind to be offered by a provincial GAA council. Originally known as the Leinster Accident Fund Tournament, the competition started as a knockout tournament for the 12 counties in Leinster. In its inaugural year, the hurling competition was the first to be played out and was won by Wexford, who beat Dublin in the final by 1–8 to 0–2. The final took place on 19 September 1954 in Enniscorthy. In 1956, the Kilkenny firm Mahon and McPhillips donated a cup to the Leinster Council to honour former Leinster chairman, Tom Walsh, following his sudden death. The Leinster Council presented this cup to the winners of the hurling competition of the Leinster Accident Fund Tournament later that year. As a result, the hurling competition became known as the Walsh Cup. The first team to lift the Walsh Cup was the newly crowned All-Ireland champions, Wexford, after they beat Kilkenny in the final by 2–10 to 1–8.

The Walsh Cup was dominated by Kilkenny, Wexford and Dublin during the fifties and sixties, but was not contested for much of the seventies. In 1977, a second cup was presented to the Leinster Council for a hurling competition which became known as the Kehoe Cup. The Leinster Council decided to alternate it with the Walsh Cup between the stronger and developing counties for the Players' Injury Fund. This resulted in Kilkenny and Wexford being moved to the newly formed Kehoe Cup. In their absence, Offaly went on to win the Walsh Cup for the first time, beating Dublin in the final by a scoreline of 7–7 to 1–7. The Walsh Cup was not contested over the next two years and in 1978, Dublin moved to the Kehoe Cup. When the Walsh Cup resumed in 1980, Kilkenny, Wexford and Dublin all remained in the Kehoe Cup, allowing teams such as Laois and Westmeath to win the Walsh Cup in 1980 and 1982 respectively. There was a break in the competition again between 1983 and 1986. When it recommenced in 1987, it was decided by the Leinster Council that the Walsh Cup would be contested by the stronger hurling counties and the Kehoe Cup by the developing counties.

The Walsh Cup remained relatively unchanged throughout the nineties, with Wexford and Offaly dominating the tournament. Between 1995 and 2002, Wexford won a record 8 consecutive titles. Their dominance ended in 2003 when Dublin, who had not won the Walsh Cup since 1966, defeated National League and All-Ireland champions, Kilkenny, in a dramatic final by a scoreline of 2–11 to 2–10 in front of a home crowd at Parnell Park. That same year, the Down hurlers made history by becoming the first non-Leinster team to enter the competition. In 2004, UCD entered the first college team in the Walsh Cup and even went on to win the tournament. In the final in Nowlan Park, the Students beat the reigning All-Ireland champions, Kilkenny, by 2–16 to 0–5. Antrim followed suit of Down when they joined the competition in 2005 and made history three years later by becoming the first team from Ulster to win the tournament. They lifted the Walsh Cup in front of a home crowd in Casement Park after defeating Offaly by 3–9 to 2–7. That year also saw the introduction of a knock-out competition between the losing teams from the first round, which became known as the Walsh Cup Shield. The purpose of the shield was to give the losing teams more than one competitive game in preparation for the upcoming season. In 2009, Galway became the first team from Connacht to enter the Walsh Cup, which came about as part of their move from the Connacht Championship to the Leinster Championship in a bid to play more competitive provincial hurling. Along with the county hurlers, Galway colleges GMIT and NUIG entered the Walsh cup, as well as Dublin college DIT. The following year, Galway won the Walsh Cup for the first time, beating Dublin in the final by 1–22 to 1–15.

In December 2011, the Leinster Council announced a three-year sponsorship deal with Bord na Móna, providing the competition with a title sponsor for the first time in its history. The new partnership, which also sponsored the Kehoe Cup and O'Byrne Cup, became known as The Bord na Móna Leinster GAA Series. In 2015, the format of the Walsh Cup changed to include a round-robin group stage in addition to the knockout stages. This meant that every team entered the tournament at the same stage and was guaranteed multiple competitive games. As a result, the Walsh Cup Shield was discontinued. The introduction of the group stages meant that more than 12 teams could now compete in the Walsh Cup. In 2017, a record 16 teams entered the tournament, with the addition of Kildare.

In 2018, college teams were excluded from the tournament, with only county teams competing.

The structure of the tournament was changed again in 2019, with four teams competing in a group stage while three teams received byes to the semi-final phase. From 2022 onward, the tournament has been made up of two groups, with the group winners meeting in the final.

== Eligibility ==
Only the top county teams from the provinces of Leinster, Ulster and Connacht are eligible to compete in the Walsh Cup. Promotion to the Walsh Cup is not necessarily guaranteed by winning the Kehoe Cup, but rather based on a mutual decision made by the Leinster Council and the team in question.

== Teams ==
=== 2026 teams ===
10 teams currently participate in the Walsh Cup:

Team	Location	Stadium	Province	Titles	Last title
Antrim	Belfast	Corrigan Park	Ulster	1	2008
Carlow	Carlow	Netwatch Cullen Park	Leinster	0	—
Dublin	Donnycarney	Parnell Park	Leinster	8	2022
Galway	Galway	Pearse Stadium	Connacht	5	2026
Kildare	Newbridge	St Conleth's Park	Leinster	0	—
Kilkenny	Kilkenny	UPMC Nowlan Park	Leinster	20	2017
Laois	Portlaoise	Laois Hire O'Moore Park	Leinster	2	1991
Offaly	Tullamore	Glenisk O'Connor Park	Leinster	5	1994
Westmeath	Mullingar	TEG Cusack Park	Leinster	1	1982
Wexford	Wexford	Chadwicks Wexford Park	Leinster	18	2024

== Format ==
The Walsh Cup, consists of an initial round-robin group stage followed by a knockout stage.

=== Group stage ===
The groups are drawn in November or December of the previous year and seeding is based on the results of the most recent All-Ireland Senior Hurling Championship. The Walsh Cup runs from January to February, with most games played on Saturday or Sunday afternoons and the others on weekday evenings. The four winning teams from each group progress to the semi-finals of the knockout stage.

Each match is played as a single leg. In the event of a tie between two teams in the same group, the winner is decided by the outcome of the meeting between the two teams in the group, then by the biggest score difference, then by the highest total points and then by a playoff.

=== Knockout stage ===
In the knockout stage, if a match ends in a draw, extra time is played. If the score is level at the end of extra time, the match is replayed.

== Venues ==
The Hogan Stand at Croke Park

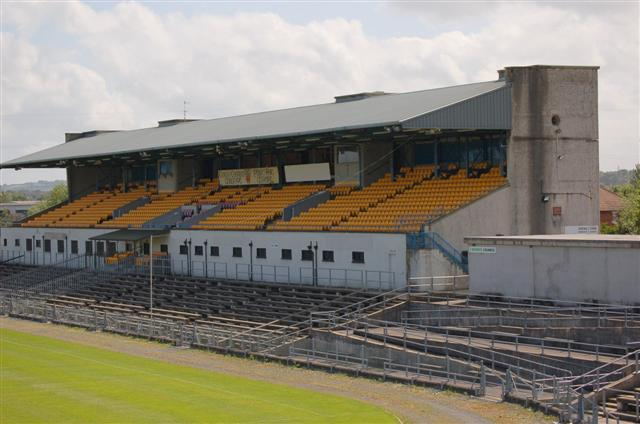
The Main Stand at Casement Park

The venues of Walsh Cup matches are decided during the draw by the first named team's home venue. Because the early stages of the Walsh Cup do not attract large crowds, matches are often held in smaller stadia within each county. The Walsh Cup final has, in recent years, been played at the GAA's headquarters in Croke Park in Dublin, as part of a double header with the O'Byrne Cup.

The following stadia are frequently used during the Walsh Cup:

Stadium	Location	Home team	Capacity
Croke Park	Dublin	N/A	82,300
Casement Park	Belfast	Antrim	32,600
Cusack Park	Mullingar	Westmeath	31,000
Nowlan Park	Kilkenny	Kilkenny	30,000
O'Moore Park	Portlaoise	Laois	27,000
Pearse Stadium	Salthill	Galway	26,197
Wexford Park	Wexford	Wexford	25,000
Dr Cullen Park	Carlow	Carlow	21,000
O'Connor Park	Tullamore	Offaly	20,000
Páirc Tailteann	Navan	Meath	17,000
Parnell Park	Donnycarney	Dublin	13,499

== Trophy ==
At the end of the final, the winning team is presented with a trophy, known as the 'Walsh Cup', which they hold until the following year's final. Traditionally, the presentation is made by the Leinster Council at a special rostrum in the stand where GAA and political dignitaries and special guests view the match. The cup is decorated with ribbons in the colours of the winning team. During the game, the cup adorns both teams' colours and the runners-up ribbons are removed before the presentation. The winning captain accepts the cup on behalf of his team before giving a short speech in Irish and then English. Individual members of the winning team then have an opportunity to come to the rostrum to lift the cup.

The trophy is named after former Leinster Council chairman, Tom Walsh, and was commissioned back in 1956, making it one of the longest serving trophies in inter-county hurling. It consists of a sterling silver cup with two large handles and a round mahogany base. It is decorated in the insular style, typically found on ancient Irish chalices. A girdle of eight panels encircles the top of the cup, meeting the top of the handles on either side. Each of the panels are decorated with animal ornament and interlace, and are separated by decorated studs. The large handles are decorated in a similar manner. There is an inscription in Irish on the front of the cup below the girdle, reading 'Corn Cuimhneacháin Tomás Breatnach', which translates to 'Thomas Walsh Memorial Cup'.

== Sponsorship ==
Since January 2012, the Walsh Cup has been sponsored. To protect the identity of the competition, the sponsored name has always included 'Walsh Cup' in addition to the sponsor's name, unlike sponsorship deals where the word 'cup' is preceded by only the sponsor's name. The tournament's sponsorship also helps to finance the Leinster GAA's Benevolent Fund. This fund is used to alleviate hardship among players, mentors and families who are in financial difficulty and is administered through the twelve counties of Leinster. In the past, it has helped local communities, families and players to finance medical bills, rebuild homes lost through tragic circumstances and made financial payments to assist disabled players. In 2015, the Walsh Cup was sponsored by Bord na Móna, and was known as "Bord na Móna Walsh Cup". Similarly, in 2024, the annual competition was sponsored by Dioralyte and was hence officially known as "Dioralyte Walsh Cup".

Below is a list of sponsors and the sponsored name of the competition:

Period	Sponsor	Name
1954–1955	No sponsor	Leinster Accident Fund Tournament
1956–2011	No sponsor	Walsh Cup
2012–23	Bord na Móna	Bord na Móna Walsh Cup
2024	Dioralyte	Dioralyte Walsh Cup
2026	No sponsor	Walsh Cup

== Roll of honour ==
The Walsh Cup has been contested 54 times since it was first held in 1954. The first team to win the tournament was Wexford, who have since held the title on 15 occasions and been runners-up 12 times. The most successful team has been Kilkenny, who have won 20 titles and been runners-up 15 times. A total of 9 different teams have won the tournament since it began, 7 of which were from Leinster, one from Connacht (Galway) and one from Ulster (Antrim). Of the remaining 6 Leinster teams, Carlow, Meath and Wicklow are yet to win the competition, while Kildare, Longford and Louth are yet to even contest a final. UCD are the only college team to have ever won the tournament.

=== By county / college ===
County/college	Titles	Runners-up	Years Won	Years Runners-up
Kilkenny	20	16	1955, 1957, 1958, 1959, 1961, 1962, 1963, 1970, 1973, 1974, 1988, 1989, 1992, 2005, 2006, 2007, 2009, 2012, 2014, 2017	1956, 1960, 1964, 1965, 1967, 1968, 1990, 1991, 1993, 1998, 2000, 2002, 2003, 2004, 2011, 2018
Wexford	18	16	1954, 1956, 1965, 1967, 1968, 1969, 1987, 1995, 1996, 1997, 1998, 1999, 2000, 2001, 2002, 2018, 2020, 2024	1959, 1961, 1962, 1963, 1970, 1973, 1989, 1992, 2005, 2006, 2007, 2013, 2016, 2019, 2022, 2023
Dublin	8	10	1960, 1964, 1966, 2003, 2011, 2013, 2016, 2022	1954, 1957, 1958, 1969, 1977, 1997, 2010, 2014, 2015, 2026
Offaly	5	5	1977, 1981, 1990, 1993, 1994	1966, 1974, 1987, 1995, 2008
Galway	5	5	2010, 2015, 2019, 2023, 2026	2009, 2012, 2017, 2020, 2024
Laois	2	4	1980, 1991	1981, 1988, 1996, 2001
Westmeath	1	1	1982	1955
UCD	1	0	2004	—
Antrim	1	0	2008	—
Carlow	0	1	—	1980
Wicklow	0	1	—	1982
Meath	0	1	—	1994

No competition: 1971, 1972, 1975, 1976, 1978, 1979, 1983–1986, 2021, 2025.

== List of finals ==
Year	Winners		Runners-up		Venue
Year	County	Score	County	Score	Venue
2026	Galway	1-16 (19) (won on pens.)	Dublin	2-13 (19)	Parnell Park, Dublin
2025	Cancelled due to fixture congestion				
2024	Wexford	1-21 (24)	Galway	0-16 (16)	Dr Cullen Park, Carlow
2023	Galway	0-23 (23)	Wexford	0-15 (15)	Wexford Park, Wexford
2022	Dublin	2-29 (35)	Wexford	0-19 (19)	Croke Park, Dublin
2021	Cancelled due to Covid-19				
2020	Wexford	1-16 (19)	Galway	0-18 (18)	O'Moore Park, Portlaoise
2019	Galway	1-23 (26)	Wexford	0-20 (20)	Bellefield GAA Complex, Enniscorthy
2018^{AET}	Wexford	1-27 (30)	Kilkenny	1-26 (29)	Nowlan Park
2017	Kilkenny	0-20 (20)	Galway	0-18 (18)	Nowlan Park
2016	Dublin	1-22 (25)	Wexford	1-12 (15)	Croke Park
2015	Galway	1-22 (25)	Dublin	1-20 (23)	Croke Park
2014	Kilkenny	0-24 (24)	Dublin	1-17 (20)	Croke Park
2013	Dublin	1-19 (22)	Wexford	0-16 (16)	Enniscorthy
2012	Kilkenny	2-20 (26)	Galway	1-14 (17)	Pearse Stadium
2011	Dublin	2-17 (23)	Kilkenny	2-13 (19)	Parnell Park
2010	Galway	1-22 (25)	Dublin	1-15 (18)	Parnell Park
2009^{AET}	Kilkenny	2-17 (23)	Galway	1-18 (21)	Freshford
2008	Antrim	3-09 (18)	Offaly	2-07 (13)	Casement Park
2007	Kilkenny	1-13 (16)	Wexford	0-10 (10)	Wexford Park
2006	Kilkenny	1-18 (21)	Wexford	1-12 (15)	Nowlan Park
2005	Kilkenny	1-13 (16)	Wexford	0-10 (10)	Wexford Park
2004	U.C.D	2-16 (22)	Kilkenny	0-05 (05)	
2003	Dublin	2-11 (17)	Kilkenny	2-10 (16)	
2002	Wexford	1-13 (16)	Kilkenny	1-12 (15)	
2001	Wexford	2-10 (16)	Laois	0-09 (09)	
2000	Wexford	1-08 (11)	Kilkenny	0-08 (08)	
1999	Wexford	W/O	Laois	Scr.	
1998	Wexford	0-17 (17)	Kilkenny	1-12 (15)	
1997	Wexford	1-12 (15)	Dublin	0-14 (14)	
1996	Wexford	1-13 (16)	Laois	0-06 (6)	
1995	Wexford	2-11 (17)	Offaly	1-12 (15)	
1994	Offaly	0-14 (14)	Meath	0-06 (6)	
1993	Offaly	1-16 (19)	Kilkenny	1-12 (15)	
1992	Kilkenny	1-12 (15)	Wexford	1-07 (10)	
1991	Laois	2-12 (18)	Kilkenny	1-12 (15)	
1990	Offaly	2-13 (19)	Kilkenny	2-09 (15)	

^{AET}: After extra time

== Walsh Cup Shield ==
Prior to 2015 all teams beaten in their first game in the Walsh Cup competed in the Walsh Cup Shield, thus guaranteeing every team at least two games. The Walsh Cup Shield was discontinued in 2015 when the Walsh Cup was changed to include an initial group stage, but was reintroduced in 2026 when the competition reverted to a knockout format.

=== Roll of honour ===
#	Team	Titles	Runners-up	Years won	Years runners-up
1	Offaly	2	1	2011, 2012	2009
1	Laois	2	0	2008, 2010	—
3	Carlow	1	2	2014	2010, 2011
3	Dublin	1	0	2009	—
3	Antrim	1	0	2013	—
3	Kilkenny	1	0	2026	—
7	DIT	0	2	—	2012, 2013
7	Westmeath	0	2	—	2008, 2014
7	Kildare	0	1	—	2026

=== List of finals ===
Year	Winners		Runners-up		Venue
Year	County	Score	County	Score	Venue
2026	Kilkenny	1-20	Kildare	2-13	Callan, County Kilkenny
2015–2025	No competition				
2014	Carlow	1-16 (19)	Westmeath	1-7 (10)	Dr. Cullen Park
2013	Antrim	2-21 (27)	DIT	1-10 (13)	Casement Park
2012	Offaly	0-22 (22)	DIT	1-14 (17)	O'Moore Park
2011^{R}	Offaly	3-23 (32)	Carlow	2-14 (20)	O'Moore Park
2010	Laois	1-16 (18)	Carlow	1-10 (13)	Dr. Cullen Park
2009	Dublin	1-20 (23)	Offaly	2-15 (21)	Banagher
2008	Laois	2-14 (20)	Westmeath	2-11 (17)	Kinnegad

^{R}: Replayed after original final was abandoned in extra time.

== See also ==
- Connacht Senior Hurling League
- Munster Senior Hurling League
- Ulster Senior Hurling League (Conor McGurk Cup)
- Kehoe Cup (Tier 2)
