= TU Dublin GAA =

Gaelic Athletic Association university club

Technological University Dublin GAA
- CLG Ollscoil Teicneolaíochta Bhaile Átha Cliath
- Founded: 1982
- County: Dublin
- Colours: Blue, Navy, White and Yellow
- Grounds: St. Brendans Grangegorman

Playing kits
Standard colours

Technological University Dublin GAA or TU Dublin GAA is a Gaelic Athletic Association university club in Technological University Dublin, County Dublin, Ireland. TU Dublin's men's Gaelic football team competed in the Sigerson Cup and the O'Byrne Cup. TU Dublin won its first Sigerson Cup in 2013, defeating UCC in the final by 3-08 to 0-08. The TU Dublin team was managed by Sean Fox, Billy O'Loughlin and Des Newton. Team captain in 2013 was All-Star defender Colin Walshe of Doohamlet in County Monaghan. The team included Aidan O'Shea, Jason Doherty, Darran O'Sullivan, Mark Collins, Tomás O'Connor, Bryan Menton, Kevin O'Brien and a number of intercounty players from several counties.

TU Dublin's hurlers won the Kehoe Cup in 2007.

TU Dublin's Fresher A Footballers have won three All-Ireland titles: 2008 (Paul Flynn, Dublin), 2010 (Aidan O'Shea, Mayo), 2014 (Brian Power, Meath). TU Dublin won the Ryan Cup (Sigerson League) in 2010 and again in 2013. The club celebrated its 30th anniversary in 2012.
