= 2011 All-Ireland Senior Hurling Championship =

Championship details
- Dates: 14 May – 4 September 2011
- Teams: 14

All-Ireland champions
- Winning team: Kilkenny (33rd win)
- Captain: Brian Hogan
- Manager: Brian Cody

All-Ireland Finalists
- Losing team: Tipperary
- Captain: Eoin Kelly
- Manager: Declan Ryan

Provincial champions
- Munster: Tipperary
- Leinster: Kilkenny
- Ulster: Not Played
- Connacht: Not Played

Championship statistics
- No. matches played: 25
- Goals total: 96 (3.84 per game)
- Points total: 872 (34.88 per game)
- Top Scorer: Paul Ryan (2–47)
- Player of the Year: Michael Fennelly
- All-Star Team: See here

The 2011 All-Ireland Senior Hurling Championship was the 123rd staging of the All-Ireland championship since its establishment by the Gaelic Athletic Association in 1887. The draw for the 2011 fixtures took place on 7 October 2010. The championship began on 14 May and ended on 4 September 2011. Tipperary were the defending champions.

Kilkenny secured the title with a 2–17 to 1–16 defeat of Tipperary in the All-Ireland final. This was their 33rd All-Ireland title, their eighth in twelve championship seasons.

== Team changes ==
=== To Championship ===
Promoted from the Christy Ring Cup

- Westmeath

=== From Championship ===
Relegated to the Christy Ring Cup

- None

== Teams ==
A total of fourteen teams will contest the championship, including thirteen teams from the 2010 championship and one promoted team from the 2010 Christy Ring Cup.

Laois, Carlow and Wexford were the first teams to exit the 2010 championship; however, there was no relegation play-off. They would all contest the 2011 championship.

2010 Christy Ring Cup champions Westmeath secured direct promotion to the championship. The team made their top flight return after being relegated at the end of the 2006 championship.

=== General information ===
Fourteen counties will compete in the All-Ireland Senior Hurling Championship: nine teams in the Leinster Senior Hurling Championship and five teams in the Munster Senior Hurling Championship.

County	Last provincial title	Last championship title	Position in 2010 Championship	Appearance
Antrim	2010	—		
Carlow	—	—		
Clare	1998	1997		
Cork	2006	2005		
Dublin	1961	1938		
Galway	1999	1988		
Kilkenny	2010	2009		
Laois	1949	1915		
Limerick	1996	1973		
Offaly	1995	1998		
Tipperary	2010	2010		
Waterford	2007	1959		
Westmeath	—	—		
Wexford	2004	1996		

=== Team summaries ===
==== Personnel and kits ====
Team	Colours	Sponsor	Captain	Vice-captain(s)	Manager(s)					
Team	Colours	Sponsor	Captain	Vice-captain(s)	Manager(s)	Antrim	Saffron and white	Creagh Concrete	Eddie McCloskey	Dinny Cahill
Carlow	Red, green and yellow	Stone Developments	Paudie Kehoe		Kevin Ryan					
Clare	Saffron and blue	Pat O'Donnell	Pat Vaughan	John Conlon	Ger O'Loughlin					
Cork	Red and white	O2	Shane O'Neill	Eoin Cadogan	Denis Walsh					
Dublin	Navy and blue	Vodafone	John McCaffrey	Tomás Brady	Anthony Daly					
Galway	Maroon and white	Supermacs	Damien Joyce	Tony Óg Regan; Damien Hayes	John McIntyre					
Kilkenny	Black and amber	Glanbia	Brian Hogan		Brian Cody					
Laois	Blue and white	MW Hire Services	Brian Campion		Brendan Fennelly					
Limerick	Green and white	Sporting Limerick	Gavin O'Mahony		Dónal O'Grady					
Offaly	Green, white and gold	Carroll Cuisine	Shane Dooley	Joe Bergin	Joe Dooley					
Tipperary	Blue and gold	Škoda Auto	Eoin Kelly	Conor O'Mahony	Declan Ryan					
Waterford	White and blue	3	Stephen Molumphy	Michael Walsh; John Mullane	Davy FitzGerald					
Westmeath	Maroon and white	Bennett	Eoin Price		Brian Hanley					
Wexford	Purple and yellow	Sports Savers	Darren Stamp	Ciarán Kenny	Colm Bonnar					

=== Managerial changes ===
Team	Outgoing manager	Manner of departure	Date of vacancy	Position	Incoming manager	Date of appointment
Laois	Niall Rigney	Resignation	30 June 2010	Pre-championship	Brendan Fennelly	27 September 2010
Limerick	Justin McCarthy	End of term	10 July 2010	Pre-championship	Dónal O'Grady	22 September 2010
Tipperary	Liam Sheedy	Mutual agreement	7 October 2010	Pre-championship	Declan Ryan	9 November 2010
Westmeath	Kevin Martin	Sacked	10 April 2011	Pre-championship	Brian Hanley	16 April 2011

== The Championship ==
=== Format ===
The All-Ireland Senior Hurling Championship of 2011 will be run on a provincial basis as usual. It will be a knockout tournament with pairings drawn at random in the respective provinces – there will be no seeds.

Each match will be played as a single leg. If a match is drawn there will be a replay. If that match ends in a draw a period of extra time will be played, however, if both sides are still level at the end of extra time another replay will take place.

Munster Championship

Quarter-final: (1 match) This will be a single match between the first two teams drawn from the province of Munster. The losing team enters the All-Ireland qualifiers while the winners advance to the semi-finals.

Semi-finals: (2 matches) The winner of the lone quarter-final joins the other three Munster teams to make up the semi-final pairings. The two winning teams advance to the final while the two losing teams enter the All-Ireland qualifiers.

Final: (1 match) The winners of the two semi-finals contest this game. The winning team advances to the All-Ireland semi-final while the losing team advances to the All-Ireland quarter-final.

Leinster Championship

Preliminary Round: (2 matches) These will be two matches between four of the 'weaker' teams from the province. The two winning teams advance to the quarter-finals while the two losing teams enter the All-Ireland qualifiers.

Quarter-finals: (3 matches) The winners of the two preliminary round games join the other four Leinster teams to make up three quarter-final pairings. The three winning teams advance to the semi-finals while the three losing teams enter the All-Ireland qualifiers.

Semi-finals: (2 matches) The three winners of the quarter-finals join Kilkenny (who will receive a bye to this stage) to make up the semi-final pairings. The two winning teams advance to the final while the two losing teams enter the All-Ireland qualifiers.

Final: (1 match) The winners of the two semi-finals contest this game. The winning team advances to the All-Ireland semi-final while the losing team advances to the All-Ireland quarter-final.

== Leinster Senior Hurling Championship ==
Preliminary round
Carlow	1–14
Westmeath	4–10
Antrim	1–21
Laois	3–12

Quarter-finals
Dublin	2–21
Offaly	1–20
Westmeath	2–14
Galway	4–17
Antrim	1–11
Wexford	3–16

Semi-finals
Dublin	0–19
Galway	2–7
Wexford	1–15
Kilkenny	1–26

Leinster final
Dublin	1–15
Kilkenny	4–17

14 May 2011
7:00pm
Preliminary round

Laois	3–12 – 1–21	Antrim
W Hyland 1-04 (0-4f), O Holohan, N Foyle 1–1 each, W Dunphy, M Whelan (0-2f) 0–2 each, J Walsh, S Bourke 0–1 each	Report	N McManus 0–10 (0-7f, 0–1 '65'), K Stewart, C McCann 0–4 each, S McCrory 1–0, M Armstrong, N McAuley (0-1f), C Herron 0–1 each

O'Moore Park, Portlaoise
Referee: A Kelly (Galway)

22 May 2011
3:30pm
Preliminary round

Carlow	1–14 – 4–10	Westmeath
R Dunbar 0–9 (6f, 1 65), E Nolan 0–3, R Coady 1–0, E Byrne, P Coady 0–1 each.	Report	B Murtagh 0-7f, D McNicholas 2–0, B Smyth 1–2, A Mitchell 1-0f, J Shaw 0–1.

Dr. Cullen Park, Carlow
Referee: T Carroll (Offaly)

29 May 2011
2:00pm
Quarter-final

Dublin	2–21 – 1–20	Offaly
P Ryan (1-08, 1–00 pen, 0-08 frees), P Carton (1-00), A McCrabbe (0-03), D O'Callaghan (0-02), R O'Dwyer (0-02), C McCormack (0-02), S Durkan (0-01), C Keaney (0-01), D Plunkett (0-01), S Lambert (0-01).	Report	S Dooley (1–13, 0–11 frees), J Bergin (0-03), D Hayden (0-01), D Currams (0-01), C Mahon (0-01), C Egan (0-01).

Croke Park, Dublin
Attendance: 14,302
Referee: John Sexton

29 May 2011
3:30pm
Quarter-Final

Wexford	3–16 – 1–11	Antrim
R Jacob (1–5); S Banville (0–4); D Redmond (1–2); J Berry (1-1f); L Prendergast (0–1); PJ Nolan (0–1); H Kehoe (0–1); E Martin (0–1).	Report	N McManus (0–5, 0-1f); K Stewart (0–3); C MacCanna (1–0); P Shiels (0–2); D Hamill (0–1).

Wexford Park, Wexford
Attendance: 4,500
Referee: C. McAllister (Cork)

4 June 2011
7:00pm
Quarter-final

Westmeath	2–14 – 4–17	Galway
B Murtagh 0–5 (5f), P Greville 1–1, D McNicholas 1–0; D Carty 0–2, C Curley, B Smyth, E Price, A Mitchell ('65), P Dowdall, J Shaw 0–1 each.	Report	C Donnellan 3–1, A Callanan 1–1 (1f), D Hayes 0–4, J Canning (3f); D Burke (2f) 0–3 each, J Gantley 0–2, A Smith, B Daly, E Ryan 0–1 each.

Cusack Park, Mullingar

11 June 2011
7:00pm
Semi-Final

Wexford	1–15 – 1–26	Kilkenny
J Berry (1-04 (1-3f), G Sinnott (0-04), P Roche (0-02, 1 '65), R Jacob (0-02), M Travers (0-01), W Doran (0-01), S Banville (0-01).		H Shefflin (0-09, 6f, 2 '65)), R Hogan (1-01), R Power (0-04, 1f), M Rice (0-04), TJ Reid (0-03), M Fennelly (0-02), P Murphy (0-01), E Larkin (0-01), C Fennelly (0-01).

Wexford Park, Wexford
Attendance: 16,500
Referee: J Ryan (Tipperary) report = Report

18 June 2011
7:00pm
Semi-Final

Dublin	0–19 – 2–7	Galway
P Ryan (0–13 11fs); C Keaney (0–3); D O'Callaghan (0–2); A McCrabbe (0–1).	Report	J Canning (1–3, 2fs); J Gantley (1–3); A Kerins (0–1).

O'Connor Park, Tullamore
Attendance: 11,618
Referee: M Wadding (Waterford)

3 July 2011
4:00pm
Final

Kilkenny	4–17 – 1–15	Dublin
H Shefflin (1-09, 0-07f), M Rice (1-02), E Larkin (1-02), C Fennelly (1-00), R Hogan (0-02), R Power (0-01), B Hogan (0-01).	Report	P Ryan (1-09, 1-09f), A McCrabbe (0-02), C McCormack (0-01), C Keaney (0-01), M O'Brien (0-01), D Plunkett (0-01).

Croke Park, Dublin
Attendance: 33,814
Referee: B Kelly (Westmeath)

== Munster Senior Hurling Championship ==
Quarter-finals
Tipperary	3–22
Cork	0–23

Semi-finals
Limerick	3–14
Waterford	3–15
Clare	1–19
Tipperary	4–19

Munster final
Waterford	0–19
Tipperary	7–19

29 May 2011
4:00pm
Quarter-final

Tipperary	3–22 – 0–23	Cork
E Kelly 1-07 (0-05f), L Corbett 1-02, S Callanan 0-05, N McGrath 0-04 (2 sls), B Dunne 1-00, J O'Brien 0-02, Patrick Maher & J Woodlock 0-01 each.	Report	P Horgan 0–13 (10f), N McCarthy & B O'Connor 0-03 each, J Gardiner, P Cronin, C McCarthy & P O'Sullivan 0-01 each.

Semple Stadium, Thurles
Attendance: 31,231
Referee: B. Gavin (Offaly)

12 June 2011
4:00pm
Semi-final

Limerick	3–14 – 3–15	Waterford
K Downes (2-01), W McNamara (1-00), N Moran (0-04), D O'Grady (0-03), R McCarthy (0–3, 3f), D Breen (0-01), G Mulcahy (0-01), B Geary (0-01, f).	Report	J Mullane (2-02), P Mahony (0-07, 4f), S Walsh (1-01), B O'Sullivan (0-02), M Shanahan (0-02), S O'Sullivan (0-01).

Semple Stadium, Thurles
Attendance: 15,650
Referee: B Kelly (Westmeath)

19 June 2011
4:00pm
Semi-final

Clare	1–19 – 4–19	Tipperary
C McGrath (1-06, 4f), J Conlon (0-03), C McInerney (0-02); D McMahon (0-02), J Clancy (0-02); J McInerney (0-01, f), N O'Connell (0-01), F Lynch (0-01), D Honan (0-01),	Report	S Callanan (1-05), E Kelly (1-03, 2f), L Corbett (1-00), Patrick Maher (1-00), N McGrath (0-03), Padraic Maher (0-02); G Ryan (0-02), S McGrath (0-02), P Bourke (0-02).

Gaelic Grounds, Limerick
Attendance: 16,700
Referee: J Owens (Wexford)

10 July 2011
4:00pm
Final

Tipperary	7–19 – 0–19	Waterford
L Corbett 4–4, E Kelly 2–6 (0-3f), S Callanan 1-00, J O’Brien 0-03, N McGrath (0-1sl), P Bourke 0–2 each, G Ryan, S Bourke 0–1 each.	Report	P Mahony 0–13 (0-12f), T Browne, S O’Sullivan, J Mullane, S Walsh, S Molumphy, M Shanahan 0–1 each.

Páirc Uí Chaoimh, Cork
Attendance: 36,654
Referee: B Gavin (Offaly)

== All-Ireland Qualifiers ==
Preliminary round
Laois	1–13
Cork	10–20
Antrim	2–25
Westmeath	1–19

Phase 1 Phase 2
Offaly	2–16
Cork	2–17
Clare	0–20
Galway	4–25
Limerick	1–21
Wexford	2–13
Carlow	1–12
Antrim	0–23

Phase 3
Cork	1–14
Galway	2–23
Limerick	3–22
Antrim	0–12

Quarter-finalists
Galway
Limerick

=== Preliminary round ===
18 June 2011
3:00pm
Preliminary round

Laois	1–13 – 10–20	Cork
W Hyland (1–4, 0–1 free); N Foyle (0–2); J Brophy (0–3); M Whelan (0–2 frees); N Costelloe (0–1); G Reddin (0–1).	Report	P Horgan (3–11, 6 frees); P O’Sullivan (3–1); J Coughlan (2–0); B Cooper (1–3); L O’Farrell (1–0); N McCarthy (0–3); B O’Connor (0–1); J Gardiner (0–1 free).

O'Moore Park, Portlaoise
Referee: J McGrath (Westmeath)

18 June 2011
3:00pm
Preliminary round

Antrim	2–25 – 1–19	Westmeath
N McManus (0–10, 8f); C McCann (2–1), P Shiels (0–3), S McCrory (0–2), K Stewart (0–2), D Hamill (0–2), C Donnelly (0-1f), C Herron (0–1), C McFall (0-1f), B McFall (0–1), A Graffin (0–1).	Report	B Murtagh (0–10, 5f, 1SL), P Grenville (1–0), P Dowdall (0–3), D McNicholas (0–3), J Shaw (0–2), C Curley (0–1).

Casement Park, Belfast
Referee: T Carroll (Offaly)

=== Phase 1 ===
25 June 2011
2:30pm
Phase 1

Cork	2–17 – 2–16	Offaly
P Horgan 0–10 (0-05f), L O'Farrell (1-00), C McCarthy (1-00), J O'Connor (0-02), B O'Connor (0-02), S O'Neill (0-01), P O'Sullivan (0-01), T Kenny (0-01).	Report	S Dooley (1-09, 0-07f, 1-00 '65'), D Currams (0-05), C Egan (1-00), J Bergin (0-01), C Mahon (0-01).

Páirc Uí Chaoimh, Cork
Attendance: 7,565
Referee: J Ryan (Tipperary)

25 June 2011
4:00pm
Phase 1

Antrim	0–23 – 1–12	Carlow
N McManus 0–9 (0-7f), D Hamill 0–3, N McAuley, E McCloskey, K Stewart, P Shiels 0–2 each, K Molloy, C McCann, T McCann 0–1 each.	Report	R Dunbar 0–5, (0-4f), P Kehoe, 1–2, S Kavanagh 0–2 '65', C Doyle, D Roberts, M Brennan 0–1 each.

Casement Park, Belfast
Attendance: 4,000
Referee: J McGrath (Westmeath)

=== Phase 2 ===
2 July 2011
5:00pm
Phase 2

Limerick	1–21 – 2–13	Wexford
D Hannon 0-09 (0-04f, 0-01sl), G Mulcahy 1-04, N Moran 0-03, D O'Grady 0-02, J Ryan, K Downes, M O'Riordan, T O'Brien 0-01 each.	Report	R Jacob, E Quigley (0-01f) 1-02 each, G Sinnott 0-03, PJ Nolan 0-02, K Rossiter, H Kehoe, E Martin, D Reynolds 0-01 each.

Gaelic Grounds, Limerick
Attendance: 14,000
Referee: M Wadding (Waterford)

2 July 2011
7:00pm
Phase 2

Galway	4–25 – 0–20	Clare
J Canning (1–09, 3f, 1 '65, 1 sideline), D Hayes, G Farragher (1-04) each, A Kerins (1-02), J Gantley (0-02), D Burke (0-01), A Smith (0-01), I Tannian (0-01), J Regan (0–1).	Report	N O'Connell (0-06, 5f, 1 '65), C McGrath (0-05, 3f), C Morey (0-03), J Conlon (0-02), J Clancy (0-01), F Lynch (0-01), C McInerney (0-01), L Markham (0-01).

Pearse Stadium, Galway
Attendance: 13,011
Referee: D Kirwan (Cork)

=== Phase 3 ===
9 July 2011
Phase 3

Cork	1–14 – 2–23	Galway
P O'Sullivan (1-03), P Horgan (0-04, 0–02 frees), C McCarthy (0-03), N McCarthy (0-02), B Cooper (0-01), C Lehane (0-01).	Report	J Canning (0–10, 0–04 frees, 0-01 '65), D Hayes (1-03), G Farragher (0-04), C Donnellan (1-00), D Burke (0-02), A Smith (0-02), J Gantley (0-01), I Tannian (0-01).

Gaelic Grounds, Limerick
Attendance: 18,900
Referee: J McGrath (Westmeath)

9 July 2011
Phase 3

Antrim	0–12 – 3–22	Limerick
N McManus 0–8 (5f), E McCloskey 0–2, C McCann, D Hamill both 0–1.	Report	D Hannon 0–8 (5f), N Moran 1–1, R McCarthy both 1–1, D Breen 1–0 S Tobin 0–3, M O'Riordan, J Ryan both 0–2, T Condon, G O'Mahony, D O'Grady, K Downes, B Geary ('65) all 0–1.

Parnell Park, Dublin
Attendance: 3,000
Referee: J Owens (Wexford)

== All-Ireland Senior hurling Championship ==
=== Bracket ===
Teams in bold advanced to the next round. The provincial champions are marked by an asterisk.

Quarter-final
**Dublin**	**3–13**
Limerick	0–18
**Waterford**	**2–23**
Galway	2–13

Semi-finals
**Tipperary***	**1–19**
Dublin	0–18
**Kilkenny***	**2–19**
Waterford	1–16

All-Ireland final
Tipperary*	1–16
**Kilkenny***	**2–17**

=== All-Ireland quarter-finals ===
24 July 2011
2:00pm
Quarter-final

Dublin	3–13 – 0–18	Limerick
R O’Dwyer 3–2; P Ryan 0–8 (6f); L Rushe, D Callaghan S Ryan 0–1 each.	Report	D Hannon 0–11 (4f, 1 65); K Downes, B Geary, G O’Mahony (2f) 0–2 each; D O’Grady 0–1.

Semple Stadium, Thurles
Attendance: 33,535
Referee: B Gavin (Offaly)

24 July 2011
4:00pm
Quarter-final

Waterford	2–23 – 2–13	Galway
S Walsh 1–4, P Mahony 0–7 (0-7f), T Ryan 1–0, K Moran, S Molumphy, J Mullane 0–3 each, E Kelly, S O’Sullivan, S Prendergast 0–1 each.	Report	J Canning 1–6 (1–0 pen, 0-2f, 0–1 ‘65’), A Harte 1–0, G Farragher 0–2, A Smith, J Regan, I Tannian, B Daly, T Óg Regan (0–1 ‘65’) 0–1 each.

Semple Stadium, Thurles
Attendance: 33,535
Referee: C McAllister (Cork)

=== All-Ireland semi-finals ===
7 August 2011
3:30pm
Semi-final

Kilkenny	2–19 – 1–16	Waterford
H Shefflin (0–7, 4F), R Hogan (2–0), M Fennelly (0–3), E Larkin (0–2), C Fennelly (0–2), B Hogan (0–1), M Rice (0–1), TJ Reid (0–1), P Hogan (0–1), E Brennan (0–1).	Report	J Mullane (1–6), E Kelly (0–3, 2f), M Shanahan (0–2, 1F), P Mahoney (0–2, 2f), S Prendergast (0–1), S Molumphy (0–1), R Foley (0–1).

Croke Park, Dublin
Attendance: 31,634
Referee: B Kelly (Westmeath)

14 August 2011
3:30pm
Semi-final

Tipperary	1–19 – 0–18	Dublin
L Corbett (1–3), E Kelly (0–6, 2f, 3 '65), N McGrath (0–3, 1 sideline), Padraic Maher (0–2), G Ryan (0–2), P Bourke (0–1, S McGrath (0–1), S Callanan (0–1).	Report	P Ryan (0–9, 6f, 1 '65), P Kelly (0–1), J Boland (0–1), A McCrabbe (0–1), R O'Dwyer (0–1), L Rushe (0–1), D O'Callaghan (0–1), L Ryan (0–1), M O'Brien (0–1), S Ryan (0–1).

Croke Park, Dublin
Attendance: 43,562
Referee: C McAllister (Cork)

=== All-Ireland Final ===
4 September 2011
3:30pm
Final

Kilkenny	2–17 – 1–16	Tipperary
H Shefflin (0–7, 5f), R Hogan (1–1), M Fennelly (1–0), R Power (0–2), C Fennelly (0–2), E Larkin (0–2), M Rice (0–1), E Brennan (0–1), TJ Reid (0–1).	Report	E Kelly (0–8, 7f, 1 '65), P Bourke (1–0), N McGrath (0–3, 1 sideline), G Ryan (0–2), C O'Mahony (0–1), J O'Brien (0–1), B Dunne (0–1).

Croke Park, Dublin
Attendance: 81,214
Referee: B Gavin (Offaly)

== Stadia and locations ==
Team	Location	Stadium	Stadium capacity
Antrim	Belfast	Casement Park	32,600
Carlow	Carlow	Dr. Cullen Park	21,000
Clare	Ennis	Cusack Park	28,000
Cork	Cork	Páirc Uí Chaoimh	43,500
Dublin	Dublin	Parnell Park	13,500
Galway	Galway	Pearse Stadium	34,000
Klkenny	Kilkenny	Nowlan Park	24,000
Laois	Portlaoise	O'Moore Park	27,000
Limerick	Limerick	Gaelic Grounds	49,500
Offaly	Tullamore	O'Connor Park	20,000
Tipperary	Thurles	Semple Stadium	53,500
Waterford	Waterford	Walsh Park	17,000
Westmeath	Mullingar	Cusack Park	15,000
Wexford	Wexford	Wexford Park	25,000

== Championship statistics ==
=== Scoring ===
- First goal of the championship: Simon McCrory for Antrim against Laois (Leinster preliminary round, 14 May 2011)
- Fastest goal of the season: 20 seconds – Paudie O'Sullivan for Cork against Galway (All-Ireland qualifiers phase 3, 9 July 2011)
- Widest winning margin: 34 points
  - Cork 10–20 : Laois 1–13 (All-Ireland qualifiers preliminary round, 18 June 2011)
- Most goals in a match: 11
  - Cork 10–20 : Laois 1–13 (All-Ireland qualifiers preliminary round, 18 June 2011)
- Most points in a match: 45
  - Tipperary 3–22 : Cork 0–23 (Munster quarter-final, 29 May 2011)
  - Galway 4–25 : Clare 0–20 (All-Ireland qualifiers phase 2, 2 July 2011)
- Most goals by one team in a match: 10
  - Cork 10–20 : Laois 1–13 (All-Ireland qualifiers preliminary round, 18 June 2011)
- Most goals scored by a losing team: 3
  - Waterford 3–15 : Limerick 3–14 (Munster semi-final, 12 June 2011)
  - Antrim 1–21 : Laois 3–12 (Leinster quarter-final, 14 May 2011)
- Most points scored by a losing team: 23
  - Tipperary 3–22 : Cork 0–23 (Munster quarter-final, 29 May 2011)

==== Top scorers ====
Overall

Rank	Player	County	Tally	Total	Matches	Average
1	Paul Ryan	Dublin	2–47	53	5	10.60
2	Patrick Horgan	Cork	3–38	47	4	11.75
3	Eoin Kelly	Tipperary	4–30	42	5	8.40
3	Neil McManus	Antrim	0–42	42	5	8.40
5	Joe Canning	Galway	3–31	40	5	7.40
6	Henry Shefflin	Kilkenny	1–32	35	4	8.75
7	Lar Corbett	Tipperary	7–9	30	4	7.50
8	Shane Dooley	Offaly	2–22	28	2	14.00
8	Declan Hannon	Limerick	0–28	28	3	9.33
10	Pauric Mahony	Waterford	0–27	27	3	9.00

Single game

Rank	Player	County	Tally	Total	Opposition
1	Patrick Horgan	Cork	3–11	20	Laois
2	Lar Corbett	Tipperary	4–4	16	Waterford
2	Shane Dooley	Offaly	1–13	16	Dublin
4	Pauric Mahony	Waterford	0–13	13	Tipperary
4	Paul Ryan	Dublin	0–13	13	Galway
4	Patrick Horgan	Cork	0–13	13	Tipperary
7	Eoin Kelly	Tipperary	2–6	12	Waterford
7	Henry Shefflin	Kilkenny	1–9	12	Dublin
7	Joe Canning	Galway	1–9	12	Clare
7	Paul Ryan	Dublin	1–9	12	Kilkenny
7	Shane Dooley	Offaly	1–9	12	Cork
12	Ryan O'Dwyer	Dublin	3–2	11	Limerick
12	Paul Ryan	Dublin	1–8	11	Offaly
12	Declan Hannon	Limerick	0–11	11	Dublin
15	Paudie O'Sullivan	Galway	3–1	10	Laois
15	Cyril Donnellan	Galway	3–1	10	Westmeath
15	Damien Hayes	Galway	2–4	10	Clare
15	Eoin Kelly	Tipperary	1–7	10	Cork
15	Brendan Murtagh	Westmeath	0–10	10	Antrim
15	Neil McManus	Antrim	0–10	10	Westmeath
15	Neil McManus	Antrim	0–10	10	Laois
15	Patrick Horgan	Cork	0–10	10	Offaly
15	Joe Canning	Galway	0–10	10	Cork

==== Hat-tricks ====
Player	For	Against	Result	Date
Cyril Donnellan	Galway	Westmeath	4–17 : 2–14	4 June 2011
Patrick Horgan	Cork	Laois	10–20 : 1–13	18 June 2011
Paudie O'Sullivan	Cork	Laois	10–20 : 1–13	18 June 2011
Ryan O'Dwyer	Dublin	Limerick	3–13 : 0–18	24 July 2011

==== Four goals in a game ====
Player	For	Against	Result	Date
Lar Corbett	Tipperary	Waterford	7–19 : 0–19	11 July 2011

=== Discipline ===
- First yellow card of the championship: John A. Delaney for Laois against Antrim, 39 minutes (14 May 2011)
- First red card of the championship: Neil McAuley for Antrim against Laois, 40 minutes (14 May 2011)

== Miscellaneous ==
- Antrim's defeat of Laois in the preliminary round of the Leinster championship is the team's first ever victory in the provincial series of games.
- The Munster quarter-final meeting of Cork and Tipperary sets a new record as the eighth consecutive year that the sides have met in championship hurling. Previous consecutive meetings stretched from 1949 (draw and replay) to 1954 – a total of seven games in six years. Earlier, eight games were played in the seven-year period 1907 to 1913, however, two of those games were played in the calendar year of 1908.
- The Leinster semi-final meeting between Wexford and Kilkenny at Wexford Park is the first championship meeting between the two sides at that venue since the 1944 Leinster semi-final.
- The All-Ireland qualifiers preliminary round meeting between Antrim and Westmeath is the first ever championship meeting between the two sides.
- The All-Ireland qualifiers preliminary round meeting between Laois and Cork is the first championship meeting between the two sides since the 1915 All-Ireland final. Laois are the only team that Cork have played but never beaten in the championship.
- Cork's total of 10–20 against Laois in the preliminary round of the qualifiers is the first time that a side has scored ten goals in the championship since Offaly defeated Westmeath by 10–9 to 2–6 in the 1966 Leinster first round.
- The Leinster semi-final meeting of Galway and Dublin is not only both sides first meeting in the provincial championship but is also the first meeting of the two sides since the 1941 All-Ireland semi-final.
- Dublin preserve their 100% championship record over Galway with a victory in the Leinster semi-final. Previous victories came in the 1924 All-Ireland final and the 1941 All-Ireland semi-final
- Lar Corbett becomes Tipperary's all-time leading championship goalscorer when he scores his 21st goal against Clare in the Munster semi-final.
- For the first time in history Dublin qualify for the provincial minor, under-21 and senior finals in the same year.
- Kilkenny's defeat of Dublin in the Leinster final is their seventh consecutive provincial title and sets a new record. Kilkenny also held the previous record of six-in-a-row between 1998 and 2003.
- Henry Shefflin's goal in the Leinster final made him the only player in history to score a goal in thirteen consecutive championship seasons.
- Tipperary's 7–19 to 0–19 defeat of Waterford is the biggest margin of victory in a Munster final since Cork beat Waterford by 5–31 to 3–6 in the 1982 provincial decider. The 21-point winning margin is joint ninth in the top ten biggest Munster final victories.
- The last time a team scored seven or more goals in a Munster final was in 1936 when Limerick defeated Tipperary by 8–5 to 4–6. Mick Mackey scored 5–3 of their total.
- Brendan Cummins equalled Christy Ring's all-time championship appearances record, joining Ring on 65 appearances for Tipperary in the Munster Final.
- Tony Browne of Waterford becomes the fourth player to achieve at least 60 championship appearances with his appearance against Galway in the All-Ireland quarter-final.
- Dublin's defeat of Limerick in the All-Ireland quarter-final is their first ever championship victory over the Munster team. As a result of this, Dublin reach the All-Ireland semi-final for the first time since 1948.
- Waterford preserve their 100% championship record over Galway with a victory in the All-Ireland quarter-final. They have now beaten the westerners on ten occasions on the championship.
- The All-Ireland semi-final between Kilkenny and Waterford is delayed by fifteen minutes due to the playing of extra time in the All-Ireland minor semi-final between Clare and Galway.
- Kilkenny become the first team ever to reach six consecutive All-Ireland finals.
- Tipperary's Brendan Cummins lines out for the 65th time in championship hurling to become the most "capped" player of all-time in the All-Ireland semi-final against Dublin. After equalling Christy Ring's long-held record in the Munster final he betters it in this game.
- The All-Ireland final between Kilkenny and Tipperary is the third year in-a-row that the sides meet in the championship decider. This is the first time that this has happened since 1903, when Cork and London met in the All-Ireland final for the third consecutive year.
- As a result of Kilkenny's All-Ireland final defeat of Tipperary, Henry Shefflin and Eddie Brennan join Christy Ring and John Doyle as holders of a record eight All-Ireland medals.

== Players ==
=== Player facts ===
Debutantes

The following players made their début in the 2011 championship:

Player	Team	Date	Opposition	Game
Michael Armstrong	Antrim	May 14	Laois	Leinster preliminary round
James Black	Antrim	May 14	Laois	Leinster preliminary round
Conor McCann	Antrim	May 14	Laois	Leinster preliminary round
Chris McGuinness	Antrim	May 14	Laois	Leinster preliminary round
Kevin Molloy	Antrim	May 14	Laois	Leinster preliminary round
Seán Burke	Laois	May 14	Antrim	Leinster preliminary round
Noel Costelloe	Laois	May 14	Antrim	Leinster preliminary round
Willie Dunphy	Laois	May 14	Antrim	Leinster preliminary round
Brian Galvin	Laois	May 14	Antrim	Leinster preliminary round
Paul Coady	Carlow	May 22	Westmeath	Leinster preliminary round
Dwaine Kavanagh	Carlow	May 22	Westmeath	Leinster preliminary round
Jack Kavanagh	Carlow	May 22	Westmeath	Leinster preliminary round
Kevin Kehoe	Carlow	May 22	Westmeath	Leinster preliminary round
Nicky Roberts	Carlow	May 22	Westmeath	Leinster preliminary round
Niall Dowdall	Westmeath	May 22	Carlow	Leinster preliminary round
Christopher Flanagan	Westmeath	May 22	Carlow	Leinster preliminary round
John Gilligan	Westmeath	May 22	Carlow	Leinster preliminary round
Alan McGrath	Westmeath	May 22	Carlow	Leinster preliminary round
Cathal Scally	Westmeath	May 22	Carlow	Leinster preliminary round
Mattie Donnelly	Antrim	May 29	Wexford	Leinster quarter-final
Seán Hawes	Antrim	May 29	Wexford	Leinster quarter-final
Kevin McKeague	Antrim	May 29	Wexford	Leinster quarter-final
Stephen McDonnell	Cork	May 29	Tipperary	Munster quarter-final
James Nagle	Cork	May 29	Tipperary	Munster quarter-final
Daire Plunkett	Dublin	May 29	Offaly	Leinster quarter-final
Colin Egan	Offaly	May 29	Dublin	Leinster quarter-final
James Mulrooney	Offaly	May 29	Dublin	Leinster quarter-final
Éanna Murphy	Offaly	May 29	Dublin	Leinster quarter-final
John O'Keeffe	Tipperary	May 29	Cork	Munster quarter-final
Niall Breen	Wexford	May 29	Antrim	Leinster quarter-final
Brian Doyle	Wexford	May 29	Antrim	Leinster quarter-final
Matthew O'Hanlon	Wexford	May 29	Antrim	Leinster quarter-final
Johnny Coen	Galway	June 4	Westmeath	Leinster quarter-final
Barry Daly	Galway	June 4	Westmeath	Leinster quarter-final
Colin Fennelly	Kilkenny	June 11	Wexford	Leinster semi-final
David Herity	Kilkenny	June 11	Wexford	Leinster semi-final
Paddy Hogan	Kilkenny	June 11	Wexford	Leinster semi-final
Paul Murphy	Kilkenny	June 11	Wexford	Leinster semi-final
Garrett Sinnott	Wexford	June 11	Kilkenny	Leinster semi-final
Kevin Downes	Limerick	June 12	Waterford	Munster semi-final
Richie McCarthy	Limerick	June 12	Waterford	Munster semi-final
Seán Tobin	Limerick	June 12	Waterford	Munster semi-final
Darragh Fives	Waterford	June 12	Limerick	Munster semi-final
Wayne Hutchinson	Waterford	June 12	Limerick	Munster semi-final
Pauric Mahony	Waterford	June 12	Limerick	Munster semi-final
Brian O'Sullivan	Waterford	June 12	Limerick	Munster semi-final
David O'Sullivan	Waterford	June 12	Limerick	Munster semi-final
Bill Cooper	Cork	June 18	Laois	All-Ireland qualifiers preliminary round
Jamie Coughlan	Cork	June 18	Laois	All-Ireland qualifiers preliminary round
Ger Reddin	Laois	June 18	Cork	All-Ireland qualifiers preliminary round
Kieran Martin	Westmeath	June 18	Antrim	All-Ireland qualifiers preliminary round
Conor McGrath	Clare	June 19	Tipperary	Munster semi-final
Cathal McInerney	Clare	June 19	Tipperary	Munster semi-final
Patrick O'Connor	Clare	June 19	Tipperary	Munster semi-final
John Coghlan	Tipperary	June 19	Clare	Munster semi-final
Stephen Lillis	Tipperary	June 19	Clare	Munster semi-final
Brian Doyle	Carlow	June 25	Westmeath	All-Ireland qualifiers phase 1
John Doyle	Carlow	June 25	Westmeath	All-Ireland qualifiers phase 1
Thomas Carroll	Offaly	June 25	Cork	All-Ireland qualifiers phase 1
Declan Hannon	Limerick	July 2	Wexford	All-Ireland qualifiers phase 2
Liam Markham	Clare	July 2	Galway	All-Ireland qualifiers phase 2
James Regan	Galway	July 2	Clare	All-Ireland qualifiers phase 2
Matthew Ruth	Kilkenny	July 3	Dublin	Leinster final
Paul Schutte	Dublin	July 3	Kilkenny	Leinster final
Conor Lehane	Cork	July 9	Galway	All-Ireland qualifiers phase 3
Jerome Maher	Waterford	July 10	Tipperary	Munster Final

Retirees

The following players played their last game in the 2011 championship:

Player	Team	Last Game	Date	Opposition	Début
Ronan Curran	Cork	All-Ireland qualifiers phase 3	July 9	Galway	2003
Benny Dunne	Tipperary	All-Ireland final	September 4	Kilkenny	2002
James "Cha" Fitzpatrick	Kilkenny	Leinster final	July 3	Dublin	2004
Clinton Hennessy	Waterford	All-Ireland semi-final	August 7	Kilkenny	2005
Ciarán Herron	Antrim	All-Ireland qualifiers phase 3	July 9	Limerick	2000
Karl McKeegan	Antrim	Leinster preliminary round	May 14	Laois	2002
Jerry O'Connor	Cork	All-Ireland qualifiers phase 3	July 9	Galway	2000
Damien Reale	Limerick	All Ireland Quarter Final	July 24	Dublin	2001
Donie Ryan	Limerick	All Ireland Quarter Final	July 24	Dublin	2000

== See also ==
- 2011 Ulster Senior Hurling Championship
- 2011 Christy Ring Cup
- 2011 Nicky Rackard Cup
- 2011 Lory Meagher Cup

== Media coverage ==
The 2011 All-Ireland Senior Hurling Championship was covered extensively in Ireland by RTÉ Television, RTÉ Radio and RTÉ.ie, with coverage of 31 live games across both the All-Ireland Football and Hurling Championships, with Michael Lyster presenting the live coverage. The Sunday Game presented by Des Cahill covered extended highlights and analysis of the day's games on a Sunday night. Live games, on demand re-runs and match highlights were also carried on the RTÉ website. TV3 also broadcast a selection of All-Ireland Senior Football Championship and All-Ireland Senior Hurling Championship matches, as well as a weekly preview show called The GAA Show which aired on a Friday evening during the championship.
