= List of Wexford senior hurling team captains =

This article lists players who have captained the Wexford county hurling team in the Leinster Senior Hurling Championship and the All-Ireland Senior Hurling Championship.

== List of captains ==
Year	Player	Club	National titles	Provincial titles
1951	Nicky Rackard	Rathnure		Leinster Hurling Final winning captain
1952				
1953				
1954	Padge Kehoe	St. Aidan's		Leinster Hurling Final winning captain
1955	Nick O'Donnell	St. Aidan's	All-Ireland Hurling Final winning captain	Leinster Hurling Final winning captain
1956	Jim English	Rathnure	All-Ireland Hurling Final winning captain	Leinster Hurling Final winning captain
1957	Tom Ryan			
1958	Harry O'Connor			
1959				
1960	Nick O'Donnell	St. Aidan's	All-Ireland Hurling Final winning captain	Leinster Hurling Final winning captain
1961	Ned Wheeler	Faythe Harriers		
1962	Billy Rackard	Rathnure		Leinster Hurling Final winning captain
1963				
1964	Pat Nolan	Oylegate-Glenbrien		Leinster Hurling Final winning captain
1965	Tom Neville	Geraldine O'Hanrahans		Leinster Hurling Final winning captain
1966				
1967	Jimmy O'Brien	Geraldine O'Hanrahans		
1968	Dan Quigley	Rathnure	All-Ireland Hurling Final winning captain	Leinster Hurling Final winning captain
1969	Tony Doran	Buffers Alley		
1970	Michael Collins	Enniscorthy Shamrocks		Leinster Hurling Final winning captain
1971				
1972	Teddy O'Connor	Rathnure		
1973	Martin Quigley	Rathnure		
1974	Martin Quigley	Rathnure		
1975	Teddy O'Connor	Rathnure		
1976	Tony Doran	Buffers Alley		Leinster Hurling Final winning captain
1977	Tony Doran	Buffers Alley		Leinster Hurling Final winning captain
1978				
1979				
1980				
1981	Martin Quigley	Rathnure		
1982				
1983				
1984	Pat Kenny			
1985				
1986				
1987				
1988				
1989				
1990				
1991				
1992	Éamonn Sinnott	Buffers Alley		
1993	Tom Dempsey	Buffers Alley		
1994	Larry Murphy	Cloughbawn		
1995	Liam Dunne	Oulart the Ballagh		
1995	George O'Connor	St. Martin's		
1996	Martin Storey	Oulart the Ballagh	All-Ireland Hurling Final winning captain	Leinster Hurling Final winning captain
1997	Rod Guiney	Rathnure		Leinster Hurling Final winning captain
1998	Martin Storey	Oulart the Ballagh		
1999	Paul Codd	Rathnure		
2000	Rory McCarthy	St. Martin's		
2001	Darragh Ryan	St. Anne's		
2002	Larry O'Gorman	Faythe Harriers		
2003	Paul Codd	Rathnure		
2004	John O'Connor	Rathnure		Leinster Hurling Final winning captain
2005	Michael Jacob	Oulart the Ballagh		
2006	Keith Rossiter	Oulart the Ballagh		
2007	Nigel Higgins	Rathnure		
2007	Damien Fitzhenry	Duffry Rovers		
2008	Rory Jacob	Oulart the Ballagh		
2009	Diarmuid Lyng	St.Martin's		
2010	Diarmuid Lyng	St.Martin's		
2010	Ciarán Kenny	Buffer's Alley		
2011	Ciarán Kenny	Buffer's Alley		
2011	Darren Stamp	Oulart the Ballagh		
2012	Keith Rossiter	Oulart the Ballagh		
2013	Garrett Sinnott	Oulart the Ballagh		
2014	Matthew O'Hanlon	St. James's		
2015	Matthew O'Hanlon	St. James's		
2016	Matthew O'Hanlon	St. James's		
2017	Matthew O'Hanlon	St. James's		
2017	Lee Chin	Faythe Harriers		
2018	Matthew O'Hanlon	St. James's		
2018	Lee Chin	Faythe Harriers		
