= Nigel Higgins =

Irish hurler

Personal information
- Born: 1980 (age 45–46) Rathnure, County Wexford

Sport
- Sport: Hurling
- Position: Forward
Club
- Years: Club
- Rathnure
Inter-county
Years	County	Apps (scores)
2005-2007	Wexford	3 (1-2)
Inter-county titles
- Leinster titles: 0
- All-Irelands: 0

Nigel Higgins (born 1980 in Rathnure, County Wexford) is an Irish sportsperson. He plays hurling with his local club Rathnure and was a member of the Wexford senior inter-county team from 2005 until 2007.

Sporting positions
Preceded by Keith Rossiter	Wexford Senior Hurling Captain; 2007	Succeeded by Damien Fitzhenry
