= Martin Quigley (hurler) =

Wexford hurler

Personal information
- Native name: Máirtín Ó Coigligh (Irish)
- Born: 1951 (age 74–75) Rathnure, County Wexford
- Height: 6 ft 0 in (183 cm)

Sport
- Sport: Hurling
- Position: Forward
Club
- Years: Club
- Rathnure
Inter-county
- Years: County
- 1970s–1980s: Wexford
Inter-county titles
- Leinster titles: 3
- All-Irelands: 0
- NHL: 1
- All Stars: 4

Martin Quigley (born 1951 in Rathnure, County Wexford) is an Irish former sportsman. He played hurling for his local club Rathnure and at senior level for the Wexford county team in the 1970s and 1980s.

== Playing career ==
=== Club ===
Quigley played his club hurling with the Rathnure club. He won his first senior county title with the club in 1971. It was the first of a famous four-in-a-row as further county titles were annexed in 1972, 1973 and 1974. These wins were converted into Leinster club titles in 1971 and 1973. Quigley won further county medals in 1977, 1979 and 1980. He continued his club hurling well into the 1980s, winning both county and Leinster titles in 1986.

=== Inter-county ===
Quigley first came to prominence on the inter-county scene as a member of the Wexford minor hurling team in the 1960s. He won a Leinster title in this grade in 1967 before later lining out in his first All-Ireland final. Cork provided the opposition on that occasion and went on to claim a 2–15 to 5–3 victory. Quigley won second Leinster minor medal in 1968 before lining out in a second All-Ireland final. Cork were the opponents once again, however, the result was the same as 'the Rebels' took the title with a 2–13 to 3–7 win.

In 1969 Quigley moved up to the under-21 grade. In this grade he won a Leinster title in 1969 before later lining out in the All-Ireland final. A Cork team that he was well used to provided the opposition on that occasion and won the game by 5–13 to 4–7. Quigley added a second Leinster under-21 title to his collection in 1970 before later playing in his second consecutive All-Ireland final. Once again Cork provided the opposition, however, the game ended in a draw. The replay proved more conclusive as 'the Rebels' trounced Quigley's side by 5–17 to 0–8. In 1971 Quigley was appointed captain of the under-21 team. That year he collected a third consecutive Leinster medal before lining out in the All-Ireland final. For the fifth year in-a-row Quigley faced Cork in a championship decider and, unfortunately, Cork made it five out of five with a 7–8 to 1–11 victory over the Leinster men.

By this stage Quigley had already made his debut on the Wexford senior team. He won a senior Leinster medal in 1970 as All-Ireland champions Kilkenny fell in the provincial final. Galway were defeated in the penultimate game of the championship, setting up an All-Ireland final meeting with Cork, Quigley's bête noire an underage levels. For the first time ever the final would be contested over eighty minutes instead of the usual sixty. The game itself was an exciting affair with a record sixty-four scores and eleven goals in all. After a free-flowing game Cork emerged victorious by 6–21 to 5–10.

Quigley played in his next Leinster final in 1971. The Kilkenny team of that era, a team often described as the greatest of all time, provided the opposition on that occasion. In fact, it was the first of five successive defeats at the hands of Kilkenny in Leinster finals for Wexford; however, Quigley missed the 1972 decider.

In spite of a lack of success in the championship Wexford reached the final of the National Hurling League in 1973. On that occasion Limerick were the opponents, however, victory went to Wexford giving Quigley his first major title at senior level.

1976 saw Wexford and Kilkenny battle it out in the Leinster final for the seventh year in succession. 'The Cats' were going for a provincial six in-a-row and an All-Ireland three-in-a-row, however, Wexford shocked the reigning champions by 2–20 to 1–6. It was a trouncing that nobody expected and it gave Quigley his second Leinster medal. Wexford's championship campaign nearly came unstuck in their next game against Galway. A high-scoring game ended in a 5–14 to 2–23 draw and a replay was forced at the newly opened Páirc Uí Chaoimh in Cork. The second game was just as tense an affair, however, Wexford emerged victorious by 3–14 to 2–14. Their opponents in the All-Ireland final were Cork, a team looking for their first championship title since 1970 when they defeated Wexford. Quigley's side got off to a great start and led by 2–2 to no score after just six minutes, however, Cork settled down and were spurred on with an inspirational display by Pat Moylan. The sides were level at the interval; however, the second-half developed into what was arguably the finest final of the decade. Cork hung on to win by 2–21 to 4–11 as Quigley was left on the losing side.

In 1977 Wexford maintained their provincial dominance with another defeat of Kilkenny. It was Quigley's third Leinster medal and the defeat for 'the Cats' brought the curtain down on Eddie Keher's inter-county career. Victory in the provincial final allowed Wexford to advance directly to the All-Ireland final. For the second year in-a-row Cork provided the opposition and another classic looked likely. Wet and windy weather severely hampered both teams, however, the game was still a close affair. For the second year in-a-row Quigley ended up on the losing side as Cork claimed a 1–17 to 3–8 victory.

In 1978 Kilkenny were back as champions of Leinster and Wexford had to go back to the drawing board. A new force in the province also emerged as Offaly won their first Leinster titles in 1980 and 1981. Quigley continued playing hurling well into the 1980s, however, after several defeats in the provincial championship he retired from inter-county hurling in 1988.

=== Provincial ===
Quigley also lined out with Leinster in the inter-provincial hurling competition. He first played for his province in 1973 as Leinster defeated Munster to take the Railway Cup. Quigley added further Railway Cup medals to his collection in 1974, 1975 and 1977.

== Post-playing career ==
Towards the end of Quigley's playing days the Gaelic Athletic Association celebrated its centenary year in 1984. Throughout the year a series of special events were held while special team selections were also named. While a special GAA Hurling Team of the Century was named, a special team of players who never won an All-Ireland medal was also selected. Quigley's contributions as a player were recognised when he was picked in the left centre-forward position on that 'fantasy' team.

Sporting positions
Preceded by Teddy O'Connor	Wexford Senior Hurling Captain; 1973–1974	Succeeded by Teddy O'Connor
Preceded by	Wexford Senior Hurling Captain; 1981	Succeeded by
