= Seán Burke =

Seán or Sean Burke may refer to:

- Seán Burke (Gaelic footballer) (born 1970), Irish retired Gaelic footballer
- Seán Burke (hurler), Irish hurler
- Sean Burke (born 1967), Canadian former professional ice hockey goaltender
- Sean Burke (baseball), baseball player
- Seán Burke (author), literary theorist and novelist
- Sean M. Burke, author, linguist and programmer
- Sean Burke, English musician and former member of Tubeway Army
- Shawn Burke, of Hamilton Tiger-Cats
