= Christopher Flanagan =

Christopher or Chris Flanagan may refer to:

- Christopher Flanagan (hurler), Irish hurler
- Chris Flanagan (cricketer) (Christopher Warren Flanagan, born 1964), New Zealand cricketer
- Chris Flanagan (politician) (Christopher Richard Flanagan), member of the Massachusetts House of Representatives
- Chris Flanagan (broadcaster), American news anchor
