= Garrett Sinnott =

Irish hurler (born 1987)

Personal information
- Native name: Gearóid Sionóid (Irish)
- Born: 9 May 1987 (age 39) Oulart, County Wexford

Sport
- Sport: Hurling
- Position: Right half forward
Club
- Years: Club
- 2005-: Oulart–The Ballagh
Club titles
- Wexford titles: 6
Inter-county*
Years	County	Apps (scores)
2011-2015	Wexford	6 (2-12)
- *Inter County team apps and scores correct as of 19:14, 8 January 2013.

Garrett Sinnott (born 9 May 1987 in Oulart, County Wexford) is an Irish sportsperson. He plays hurling with his local club Oulart–The Ballagh and has been a member of the Wexford senior inter-county team since 2011.

Sporting positions
Preceded by Keith Rossiter	Wexford Senior Hurling Captain; 2013-2014	Succeeded by Matthew O'Hanlon
