= Scally =

Surname of Irish origin

Scally (also spelled Skelly or Skally) and "Uí Sceallaígh” in Irish and “Uí Scalaí” in modern Irish is a surname of Irish origin.

== Origins ==
The surname Scally is an anglicized version of the Gaelic "Mac Scalaíghe ", which means "Son of the Storyteller". It was first found in County Westmeath. The variations of the name were formed when church officials spelled the names as they were pronounced, which caused many different spellings of the surname.

== Variations ==
The first recorded spelling of the family name is shown to be that of Mac Scalaíghe, which was dated around 1100 by the Ancient Records of Westmeath during the reign of High Kings of Ireland.

The clan were forced to spread out due to Anglo-Norman pressure but many remained in the Midlands.

The form Scales is found mainly in County Clare

The form Skelly is found mainly in Counties Roscommon and Westmeath.

Scally also found in County Antrim and Down.

== Notable people surnamed Scally ==
=== Academia ===
- Gabriel Scally (physician) (born 1954), Irish public health physician

=== Arts and entertainment ===
- Alex Scally (born 1982), American musician
- Caroline Scally (1886–1973), Irish artist
- Gwyneth Scally, American artist

=== Sport ===
- Cathal Scally, (born 1994), Irish hurler
- Ciaran Scally, Irish rugby player in the 1990s
- Gabriel Scally (field hockey) (born 1947), Argentine field hockey player
- Joseph Scally (born 2002), American soccer player
- Luis Scally (1915–1994), Argentine field hockey player
- Neil Scally (born 1978), Scottish footballer
- Paul Scally, businessman, chairman of Gillingham Football Club in Kent, England
- Tommy Scally (1927–1977), Argentine field hockey player
