= McKague =

McKague is a surname. Notable people with the surname include:

- Shirley McKague (1935–2020), American politician
- Yvonne McKague Housser (1898–1996), Canadian painter

== See also ==
- McKague, Saskatchewan, locality
- McKeague
