= Gabriel Scally =

Gabriel Scally may refer to:

- Gabriel Scally (field hockey), Argentine field hockey player
- Gabriel Scally (physician), Northern Irish public health physician
