= Scallywag =

Scallywag may refer to:

- Scallywag (magazine), an alternative community magazine of the 1990s
- Scallywags (Second World War), a nickname for the British GHQ Auxiliary Units, who were to engage in guerilla warfare in the event of a Nazi invasion
- Scallywag bunker, a term for an GHQ Auxiliary Unit Operational Base
- Scallywagga, a 2007 British comedy sketch show

== See also ==
- Scalawag (disambiguation)
- Scally, a surname of Irish origin
