= Éanna Murphy =

Éanna Murphy may refer to:

- Éanna Murphy (Offaly hurler) (born 1990)
- Éanna Murphy (Galway hurler) (born 1998)
