= Brian Galvin =

Irish hurler

Personal information
- Born: Ireland

Sport
- Sport: Hurling
- Position: Half-Back
Inter-county
| Years | County | Apps (scores) |
| 2011- | Laois | 1 |
Inter-county titles
- Leinster titles: 0
- All-Irelands: 0
- NHL: 0
- All Stars: 0

Brian Galvin is an Irish sportsperson. He plays hurling with the Laois senior inter-county hurling team. On 14 May 2011, he made his championship debut against Antrim in the 2011 All-Ireland Senior Hurling Championship, starting in the half back line in a 1-21 to 3-12 defeat.
