= Darren Stamp =

Irish hurler

Personal information
- Native name: Darren de Stamp (Irish)
- Born: 2 December 1980 (age 45) Oulart, County Wexford

Sport
- Sport: Hurling
- Position: Centre Back
Club
- Years: Club
- Oulart–The Ballagh
Club titles
- Wexford titles: 6
Inter-county*
Years	County	Apps (scores)
2001-2012	Wexford	33 (0-9)
Inter-county titles
- NHL: 1
- *Inter County team apps and scores correct as of 23:33, 26 September 2012.

Darren Stamp (born 2 December 1980 in Oulart, County Wexford) is an Irish hurler who played as a centre-back for the Wexford senior team.

Stamp joined the team during the 2001 National League and was a regular member of the starting fifteen until his retirement after the 2010 championship. During that time he won one National League (Division 2) winners' medal.

Walsh is a six-time county club championship medalist with Oulart–The Ballagh.

== Playing career ==
=== Club ===
Stamp plays his club hurling with the Oulart–The Ballagh club and has enjoyed much success. After just missing out on a county minor championship medal due to being overage

In 2004 Stamp won his first county club championship medal following a defeat of three-in-a-row hopefuls Rathnure. It was the beginning of a hugely successful period for the club, with Stamp adding a second successive championship medal to his collection in 2005 as St. Martin's were defeated.

After failing in their bid for a hat-trick of championship titles, Oulart–The Ballagh trounced Buffer's Alley by 4–14 to 2–6 in 2007. It was Stamp's third county championship medal.

Oulart surrendered their title at the final stage in 2008, however, the team went on to dominate the county championship scene for the following few years. Stamp added three more successive championship medals to his collection in 2009, 2010 and 2011, following respective victories over Buffer's Alley, St. Martin's and Rathnure.

=== Inter-county ===
Stamp enjoyed his first success on the inter-county scene as a member of the Wexford under-21 team. He won a Leinster medal in this grade in 2001.

That same year Stamp made his debut for the Wexford senior team in the National Hurling League. He subsequently made his championship debut in a game against Laois.

Stamp's first three seasons with Wexford saw the team lose three successive provincial finals to near rivals Kilkenny, however, during this period Wexford did contest two All-Ireland semi-finals.

In 2004 Wexford's miserable National League campaign led to dissatisfaction in the team. Stamp withdrew from the panel midway through that campaign. Because of his decision to leave, Stamp missed out on a Leinster winners' medal later that year.

Stamp's period in exile was short-lived and he returned to the Wexford team in 2005. The team endured more heartbreak, losing four successive Leinster finals to Kilkenny.

In 2010 Stamp claimed his first silverware at senior level with Wexford, when he won a National League (Division 2) winners' medal following a 1–16 to 2–9 defeat of Clare.

Stamp served as Wexford captain for one season in 2011, however, his tenure was an unsuccessful one.

Following Wexford's exit from the championship in 2012, Stamp retired from inter-county hurling.

=== Inter-provincial ===
In 2012 Stamp won an Interprovincial Championship winners' medal as a non-playing substitute in 2012, as Leinster defeated Connacht in the final.

Sporting positions
Preceded by Ciarán Kenny	Wexford Senior Hurling Captain; 2011	Succeeded by Keith Rossiter
