= McKeague =

McKeague is a surname. Notable people with the surname include:

- David McKeague (born 1946), American judge
- John McKeague (died 1982), Northern Irish politician
- Kelly K. McKeague, Director, Defense POW/MIA Accounting Agency
- Kevin McKeague, Irish hurler
- Corrie McKeague, missing RAF pilot
