= Kevin Molloy =

Irish hurler

Personal information
- Born: Northern Ireland

Sport
- Sport: Hurling
- Position: Left corner-back
Inter-county
Years	County	Apps (scores)
2011-	Antrim	1 (0-00)
Inter-county titles
- Leinster titles: 0
- All-Irelands: 0
- NHL: 0
- All Stars: 0

Kevin Molloy is an Irish sportsperson. He plays hurling with the Antrim senior inter-county hurling team and has been a member of the panel since 2011. He made his senior Antrim debut on 14 May 2011 against Laois in the 2011 All-Ireland Senior Hurling Championship, starting at left corner back in the 1-21 to 3-12 victory.

Kevin plays his club hurling for Dunloy Cuchulainns. He has one senior championship medal, won in 2009.

In 2017 Molloy was a selector on the Galway Maroon team. His son, Conor, plays for Clarinbridge, and was the star forward on the St. Brigid's College Loughrea team.
