= Scalawag (disambiguation) =

Scalawag is a nickname for Southern whites who supported Reconstruction after the American Civil War.

Scalawag may also refer to:

- Scalawag (film), a 1973 film directed by Kirk Douglas
- Scalawags, a podcast about the Scala programming language
- Scalawag (magazine), an American nonprofit magazine focused on Southern politics and culture

== See also ==
- Scallywag (disambiguation)
