= Noel Costelloe =

Irish sportsperson

Personal information
- Born: Ireland

Sport
- Sport: Hurling
- Position: Centre Forward
Inter-county
Years	County	Apps (scores)
2011-	Laois	1
Inter-county titles
- Leinster titles: 0
- All-Irelands: 0
- NHL: 0
- All Stars: 0

Noel Costelloe is an Irish sportsperson. He plays hurling with the Laois senior inter-county hurling team. On 14 May 2011, he made his championship debut against Antrim in the 2011 All-Ireland Senior Hurling Championship, starting at centre forward in a 1–21 to 3–12 defeat.
