= Seán Burke (hurler) =

Hurler

Seán Bourke
Personal information
- Born: Ireland

Sport
- Sport: Hurling
- Position: Centre Field
Inter-county
Years	County	Apps (scores)
2011-	Laois	1(0-00)
Inter-county titles
- Leinster titles: 0
- All-Irelands: 0
- NHL: 0
- All Stars: 0

Seán Bourke is an Irish sportsperson. He plays hurling with the Laois senior inter-county hurling team. On 14 May 2011, he made his championship debut against Antrim in the 2011 All-Ireland Senior Hurling Championship, starting at centre field in a 1-21 to 3-12 defeat.
