= Nicky Roberts =

Irish hurler

Personal information
- Native name: Nioclás Mac Roibeaird (Irish)
- Born: 1990 (age 35–36) Myshall, County Carlow, Ireland

Sport
- Sport: Hurling
- Position: Goalkeeper
Club
- Years: Club
- 2009-present: Naomh Eoin
Inter-county*
Years	County	Apps (scores)
2011-	Carlow	1 (0-00)
Inter-county titles
- Leinster titles: 0
- All-Irelands: 0
- NHL: 0
- All Stars: 0
- *Inter County team apps and scores correct as of 01:06, 7 June 2011.

Nicky Roberts (born 1990 in Myshall, County Carlow, Ireland) is an Irish sportsperson. He plays hurling with his local club Naomh Eoin and has been a member of the Carlow senior inter-county team since 2011.
