= Brian Doyle (Wexford hurler) =

Irish sportsperson

Personal information
- Native name: Brian Ó Dubhaill (Irish)
- Born: 1991 (age 34–35) Barntown, County Wexford, Ireland

Sport
- Sport: Hurling
- Position: Right corner-forward
Club
- Years: Club
- 2009-present: Shelmaliers
Club titles
- Wexford titles: 0
Inter-county*
Years	County	Apps (scores)
2011-	Wexford	1 (0-00)
Inter-county titles
- Leinster titles: 0
- All-Irelands: 0
- NHL: 0
- All Stars: 0
- *Inter County team apps and scores correct as of 01:10, 6 June 2011.

Brian Doyle (born 1991 in Barntown, County Wexford) is an Irish sportsperson. He plays hurling with his local club Shelmaliers and has been a member of the Wexford senior inter-county team since 2011.

== Playing career ==
=== Club ===
Doyle plays his club hurling with the Shelmaliers club.

=== Inter-county ===
Doyle has lined out in all grades for Wexford, beginning as a member of the county's minor team in 2009. His tenure as a member of the minor team saw Wexford lose the Leinster final to Kilkenny. Doyle subsequently joined the Wexford under-21 hurling team.

Doyle made his senior championship debut when he came on as a substitute against Antrim in 2011.
