= Teddy O'Connor =

Irish hurler

Personal information
- Native name: Tadhg Ó Conchubhair (Irish)
- Born: Rathnure, County Wexford
- Height: 5 ft 7 in (170 cm)

Sport
- Sport: Hurling
- Position: Right corner-back
Club
- Years: Club
- 1960s-1980s: Rathnure
Inter-county
- Years: County
- 1967 _ 1978: Wexford
Inter-county titles
- Leinster titles: 4
- All-Irelands: 1
- NHL: 1
- All Stars: 0

Teddy O'Connor (born 1946 in Rathnure, County Wexford) is an Irish retired hurler. He played for his local club Rathnure and was a member of the Wexford senior inter-county team from 1967 until 1978.
