= Chris McGuinness =

Irish hurler

Personal information
- Native name: Criostóir Mac Aonghusa (Irish)
- Born: 1992 (age 33–34) Belfast, Northern Ireland

Sport
- Sport: Hurling
- Position: Right corner-back
Club
- Years: Club
- 2010-present: O'Donovan Rossa
Club titles
- Antrim titles: 0
Inter-county
Years	County	Apps (scores)
2011-	Antrim	1 (0-00)
Inter-county titles
- Leinster titles: 0
- All-Irelands: 0
- NHL: 0
- All Stars: 0

Chris McGuinness (born 1992 in Belfast, Northern Ireland) is an Irish sportsperson. He plays hurling with his local club O'Donovan Rossa and has been a member of the Antrim senior inter-county hurling team since 2011.
