= Niall Dowdall =

Irish sportsperson

Personal information
- Native name: Niall Dúdal (Irish)
- Born: 1992 (age 33–34) Clonkill, County Westmeath, Ireland

Sport
- Sport: Hurling
- Position: Right corner-forward
Club
- Years: Club
- 2010-present: Clonkill
Inter-county*
Years	County	Apps (scores)
2011-	Westmeath	1 (0-00)
Inter-county titles
- Leinster titles: 0
- All-Irelands: 0
- NHL: 0
- All Stars: 0
- *Inter County team apps and scores correct as of 20:10, 9 June 2011.

Niall Dowdall (born 1992 in Clonkill, County Westmeath, Ireland) is an Irish sportsperson. He plays hurling with his local club Clonkill and has been a member of the Westmeath senior inter-county team since 2011.
