= Ciarán Kenny =

Irish hurler

Personal information
- Native name: Ciarán Ó Cionnaith (Irish)
- Born: 14 August 1984 (age 42) Kilmuckridge, County Wexford, Ireland

Sport
- Sport: Hurling
- Position: Left half back
Club
- Years: Club
- 2002-: Buffers Alley
Inter-county*
| Years | County | Apps (scores) |
| 2006-2015 | Wexford | 14 (0-0) |
- *Inter County team apps and scores correct as of 18:30, 14 June 2011.

Ciarán Kenny (born 14 August 1984 in Kilmuckridge, County Wexford, Ireland) is an Irish sportsperson. He plays hurling with his local club Buffers Alley and has been a member of the Wexford senior inter-county team since 2006.

Sporting positions
| Preceded by Rory Jacob | Wexford Senior Hurling Captain; 2010-2011 | Succeeded by Darren Stamp |
