= James Nagle (hurler) =

Irish hurler (born 1990)

Personal information
- Native name: Séamus de Nógla (Irish)
- Born: 26 October 1990 (age 36) Midleton, County Cork, Ireland
- Occupation: Finance graduate
- Height: 6 ft 3 in (191 cm)

Sport
- Sport: Hurling
- Position: Left wing-back
Club
- Years: Club
- Midleton
Club titles
- Cork titles: 1
College
- Years: College
- 2009-2013: University College Cork
College titles
- Fitzgibbon titles: 2
Inter-county*
Years	County	Apps (scores)
2010-2011	Cork	1 (0-00)
Inter-county titles
- Munster titles: 0
- All-Irelands: 0
- NHL: 0
- All Stars: 0
- *Inter County team apps and scores correct as of 16:48, 3 June 2011.

Jamie Nagle (born 26 October 1990) is an Irish hurler who plays for club side Midleton. He is a former member of the Cork senior hurling team.

== Career ==
A member of the Midleton club, Nagle first came to prominence at juvenile and underage levels while simultaneously playing with Midleton CBS in the Harty Cup. After captaining Midleton to the Cork U21HC title in 2011, he later won a Cork SHC title in 2013. Around this time Nagle also won consecutive Fitzgibbon Cup titles with University College Cork. He later linked up with the Midleton intermediate team. Nagle first appeared on the inter-county scene during an unsuccessful two-year stint with the Cork under-21 hurling team. He made his senior team debut in the pre-season Waterford Crystal Cup in 2010 and was included on the championship panel the following year.

== Career statistics ==
Team	Year	National League			Munster		All-Ireland		Total	
Team	Year	Division	Apps	Score	Apps	Score	Apps	Score	Apps	Score
Cork	2010	Division 1	—		—		—		—	
Cork	2011	Division 1	2	0-00	1	0-00	0	0-00	3	0-00
Career total			2	0-00	1	0-00	0	0-00	3	0-00

== Honours ==
University College Cork

- Fitzgibbon Cup: 2012, 2013

Midleton

- Cork Senior Hurling Championship: 2013
- Cork Under-21 Hurling Championship: 2011 (c)
