= Michael Armstrong (hurler) =

Northern Irish sportsperson

Personal information
- Native name: Mícheál Ó Labhraí Tréan (Irish)
- Born: 1990 (age 35–36) Belfast, Northern Ireland

Sport
- Sport: Hurling
- Position: Left wing-back
Clubs
- Years: Club
- 2008-present: O'Donovan Rossa, Gort Na Mona, Davitt's
Inter-county*
Years	County	Apps (scores)
2011-	Antrim	2 (0-01)
Inter-county titles
- Leinster titles: 0
- All-Irelands: 0
- NHL: 0
- All Stars: 0
- *Inter County team apps and scores correct as of 17:18, 3 June 2011.

Michael Armstrong (born 1990 in Belfast, Northern Ireland) is a Northern Irish sportsperson. He plays hurling with his local club O'Donovan Rossa, having previously played for Gort Na Mona and Davitt's, and has been a member of the Antrim senior inter-county team since 2011.
