= 1903 All-Ireland Senior Hurling Championship final =

1903 All-Ireland Senior Hurling Final
- Event: 1903 All-Ireland Senior Hurling Championship
Cork	London
3-16	1-1
- Date: 12 November 1905
- Venue: Jones' Road, Dublin
- Referee: John McCarthy (Kilkenny)

The 1903 All-Ireland Senior Hurling Championship Final was the 16th All-Ireland Final and the culmination of the 1903 All-Ireland Senior Hurling Championship, an inter-county hurling tournament for the top teams in Ireland. The match was held at Jones' Road, Dublin, on 12 November 1905 between London, represented by club side Hibernians, and a Cork selection. The London champions lost to their Munster opponents on a score line of 3–16 to 1-1.

== Match details ==
1905-11-12

Cork	3-16 – 1-1	London

Jones' Road, Dublin
Referee: John McCarthy (Kilkenny)

Cork Team Steva Riordan, Willie O'Neill, Denis Buckley, Andy Dooric Buckley, Dinny Kidney, Denis Rokereen O'Keefe, Pat O'Sullivan, Michael, O'Leary, Ger O'Leary, Tom Honest Man Coughlan, Billy Mackesy, Dave McGrath, Larry Flaherty, Jer Coughlan, Jamesy Kelleher, Jerry Jeremiah Desmond, Bill Hennessy
