= Ger Reddin =

Irish hurler

Personal information
- Native name: Gearóid Ó Roideáin (Irish)
- Born: 14 January 1988 (age 38) Newtownshandrum, County Cork, Ireland
- Height: 6 ft 2 in (188 cm)

Sport
- Sport: Hurling
- Position: Centre-forward
Club
- Years: Club
- 2005-present: Castletown
Club titles
- Laois titles: 1
Inter-county*
Years	County	Apps (scores)
2011-	Laois	1 (0-1)
Inter-county titles
- Leinster titles: 0
- All-Irelands: 0
- NHL: 0
- All Stars: 0
- *Inter County team apps and scores correct as of 15:40, 25 June 2011.

Ger Reddin (born 14 January 1988 in Castletown, County Laois, Ireland) is an Irish sportsperson. He plays hurling with his local club Castletown and has been a member of the Laois senior inter-county team since 2011.
