= Seán Hawes =

Irish hurler (born 1980)

Personal information
- Native name: Seán Ó hEachach (Irish)
- Born: 1980 (age 45–46) Cratloe, County Clare, Ireland

Sport
- Sport: Hurling
- Position: Goalkeeper
Club
- Years: Club
- 1984-2010: Cratloe
Club titles
- Clare titles: 1
Inter-county*
Years	County	Apps (scores)
2007 2011	Clare; Antrim	0 (0-00); 1 (0-00)
Inter-county titles
- Munster titles: 0
- All-Irelands: 0
- NHL: 0
- All Stars: 0
- *Inter County team apps and scores correct as of 18:02, 3 June 2011.

Seán Hawes (born 1980 in Cratloe, County Clare, Ireland) is an Irish sportsperson.
