= Chris Flanagan (cricketer) =

New Zealand cricketer (born 1964)

Personal information
- Full name: Christopher Warren Flanagan
- Born: 7 May 1964 (age 62); Christchurch, New Zealand
- Batting: Left-handed
- Bowling: Left-arm medium pace

Domestic team information
- Years: Team
- 1986/87–1994/95: Canterbury

Career statistics
Competition	FC	List A
Matches	21	27
Runs scored	487	219
Batting average	20.29	14.60
100s/50s	0/2	0/0
Top score	69*	40
Balls bowled	3,212	1,260
Wickets	52	24
Bowling average	27.32	34.35
5 wickets in innings	2	0
10 wickets in match	1	–
Best bowling	6/30	3/20
Catches/stumpings	8/–	7/–
- Source: Cricinfo, 19 February 2025

Christopher Warren Flanagan (born 7 May 1964) is a former New Zealand cricketer. He played in 21 first-class and 27 List A matches for Canterbury from 1986 to 1995.

A left-arm medium-pace bowler and useful batsman in the lower order, Flanagan's best first-class bowling figures were 6 for 30 and 5 for 37 in Canterbury's 48-run victory over Auckland in December 1993. Eight of his eleven victims were out leg before wicket. Playing for High School Old Boys in the Christchurch senior competition in 1996-97, Flanagan took figures of 10 for 8 in an innings against Sydenham, the best figures in the competition's history.
