= Kevin McKeague =

Irish hurler

Personal information
- Born: Ireland

Sport
- Sport: Hurling
- Position: Centre-Field
Club
- Years: Club
- Dunloy
Inter-county
Years	County	Apps (scores)
2011-	Antrim	1
Inter-county titles
- Leinster titles: 0
- All-Irelands: 0
- NHL: 0
- All Stars: 0

Kevin McKeague is an Irish sportsperson. He plays hurling with the Antrim senior inter-county hurling team. On 29 May 2011, he made his championship debut against Wexford in the 2011 All-Ireland Senior Hurling Championship, coming on as a substitute in a 3-16 to 1-11 defeat.
