= Christopher Flanagan (hurler) =

Irish sportsperson

Personal information
- Born: Ireland

Sport
- Sport: Hurling
- Position: Corner-Back
Inter-county
Years	County	Apps (scores)
2011-	Westmeath	2
Inter-county titles
- Leinster titles: 0
- All-Irelands: 0
- NHL: 0
- All Stars: 0

Christopher Flanagan is an Irish sportsperson. He plays hurling with the Westmeath senior inter-county hurling team. On 22 May 2011, he made his championship debut against Carlow in the 2011 All-Ireland Senior Hurling Championship, starting at right corner back in a 4-10 to 1-14 win.
