= Seán Burke (author) =

Welsh literary theorist and novelist

Seán Burke is a literary theorist and novelist. His work as a theorist challenges the postmodern displacement of the self and reintroduces the author as a central concept in contemporary thought. Burke’s fiction explores themes of alienation and addiction in claustrophobic settings such as the old Tiger Bay of his native Cardiff.

== Early life and career ==
Burke was born to an Irish family in Cardiff, Wales in 1961. He studied English and Philosophy at the University of Kent and received a Ph.D. from the University of Edinburgh in 1989. He was Reader in English Studies at the University of Durham where he taught from 1992-2006 and has since worked as a freelance writer

== Academic Writing ==
At a time when continental theorists and philosophers were heralding the death of the author as a twentieth-century event analogous to the death of God, Burke proposed that anti-authorial discourses were contradictory and self-defeating. His first book, The Death and Return of the Author argued through close readings and philosophical analysis that the concept of the author nonetheless remained profoundly active in theoretical discourses which promulgated the death of the author. Burke’s project of ‘the return of the author’ was developed in Authorship: From Plato to the Postmodern and The Ethics of Writing, the latter book arguing that authors can be held responsible not only for intended but also unintended consequences of their work.

== Fiction ==
Burke’s first novel, Deadwater, a Cardiff-set work of literary noir, was praised upon publication for its evocation of a docklands’ community in terminal decline. The novel has appeared in French translation and was optioned as a film by Rising Tide Productions. His second novel, The Englishwoman, concerning a young woman who voluntarily enters into a jihadist hostage situation, came out in May 2021.

== Influence ==
The Death and Return of the Author was positively reviewed in 1992 by James Wood who wrote: ‘This very distinguished book is that mixture of rigour and plainness in theory that readers who care about the author have been awaiting.’ Brian Vickers stated: ‘The whole concept of the death of the author has been finally put to rest by Seán Burke.’The Death and Return of the Author has gone through expanded second and third editions in 1998 and 2009.

== Academic Books ==
- The Death and Return of the Author: Criticism and Subjectivity in Barthes, Foucault and Derrida (Edinburgh: Edinburgh University Press, 1992) ISBN 07486-03557
- Authorship from Plato to the Postmodern: A Reader (Edinburgh: Edinburgh University Press, 1995) ISBN 07486-06181
- The Death and Return of the Author, Second Edition (Edinburgh: Edinburgh University Press, 1998) ISBN 07486-10065
- The Death and Return of the Author, Third Edition (Edinburgh: Edinburgh University Press, 2008) ISBN 978-0748637119
- The Ethics of Writing: Authorship and Legacy in Plato and Nietzsche (Edinburgh: Edinburgh University Press, 2008) ISBN 978-0 748618309

== Novels ==
- Deadwater (London: Serpent's Tail, 2002) ISBN 978-1852426934
- Au Bout des Docks, trans. Ellies Claude-Robert (Paris: Rivages, 2008). French translation of Deadwater. ISBN 978-2743616298
- The Englishwoman, OMG Publishing, 2021

== Short stories ==
- ‘The Regenerate Man’, Shorts from South Glamorgan, Tracey Walton ed., (Peterborough: Forward Press, 199 ISBN 1 874304 55 6
- ‘The Trials of Mahmood Mattan’ in John Williams ed., Wales, Half Welsh (London: Bloomsbury, 2004) ISBN 0-7475-6606-2
- ‘The Night of Nights, 1948’, Riptide, v.2 (2008) ISBN 978-0955832604
