= Cathal Scally =

Irish hurler

Personal information
- Native name: Cathal Mac Scalaí (Irish)
- Born: 1994 (age 31–32) Clonkill, County Westmeath, Ireland

Sport
- Sport: Hurling
- Position: Goalkeeper
Club
- Years: Club
- 2010-present: Clonkill
Inter-county*
Years	County	Apps (scores)
2011-	Westmeath	1 (0-00)
Inter-county titles
- Leinster titles: 0
- All-Irelands: 0
- NHL: 0
- All Stars: 0
- *Inter County team apps and scores correct as of 17:06, 3 June 2011.

Cathal Scally (born 1994 in Clonkill, County Westmeath, Ireland) is an Irish sportsperson. He plays hurling with his local club Clonkill and has been a member of the Westmeath senior inter-county team since 2011.
