= Éanna Murphy (Offaly hurler) =

Irish hurler

Personal information
- Native name: Éanna Ó Murchú (Irish)
- Born: 1990 (age 35–36) Clareen, County Offaly, Ireland

Sport
- Sport: Hurling
- Position: Centre-back
Club
- Years: Club
- 2007-present: Seir Kieran
Club titles
- Offaly titles: 0
Inter-county*
Years	County	Apps (scores)
2009-present	Offaly	1 (0-00)
Inter-county titles
- Leinster titles: 0
- All-Irelands: 0
- NHL: 0
- All Stars: 0
- *Inter County team apps and scores correct as of 18:17, 26 June 2011.

Éanna Murphy (born 1990 in Clareen, County Offaly, Ireland) is an Irish sportsperson. He plays hurling with his local club Seir Kieran and has been a member of the Offaly senior inter-county team since 2009.

== Playing career ==
=== Club ===
Murphy plays his club hurling with Seir Kieran.

=== Inter-county ===
Murphy has lined out in all grades for Offaly. He started in 2008 as a member of the county's minor hurling team before subsequently joining the Offaly under-21 team. He enjoyed little success in either grade.

Murphy was just out of the minor grade when he joined the Offaly senior hurling team in 2009. He made his debut as a substitute in a National Hurling League game against Carlow, however, he remained on the fringes of the team for the next few years. Murphy made his championship debut against Dublin in 2011.
