= 2014 Interprovincial Hurling Championship =

- Dates: 9 February – 1 March 2014
- Teams: Connacht; Leinster; Munster; Ulster

The 2014 Interprovincial Hurling Championship, known as the 2014 M Donnelly Hurling Interprovincial Championship due to the tournament's sponsorship by businessman Martin Donnelly, is the 85th series of the Interprovincial Championship. The annual hurling championship between the four historic provinces of Ireland is contested by Connacht, Leinster, Munster and Ulster.

Munster are the defending champions.

== Fixtures/results ==
=== Interprovincial Championship ===
9 February 2014 Semi-final	Connacht	1-18 – 0-16	Munster	Dunlo GAA Grounds
	C Cooney 0-11 (7fs, 0-1pen), J Flynn 0-3, D Glennon 1-0, P Brehony 0-2, C Mannion & R Cummins 0-1 each.	Report	P Horgan 0-6 (4f), D Kearney, N McGrath, A Nash (2f) & C Ryan (1f) 0-2 each, P Maher & S Walsh 0-1 each.	Referee: Paud O’Dwyer (Carlow)

9 February 2014 Semi-final	Leinster	8-18 – 1-21	Ulster	St. Loman's Park
	C Fennelly 2-2, J Bergin 2-0, E Larkin 1-3 (1f), P Ryan (1-0 pen), J Guiney 1-2 each, R O’Dwyer 1-1, D Currams 0-3, P Murphy, C Keaney 0-2 each, J McCaffrey 0-1.	Report	P Shiels 1-5 (1-4fs), N McManus 0-5 (0-1 pen), N McKenna, C Clarke 0-4 each, C Woods, A Grant, D McKernan 0-1 each.	Referee: J Keane (Galway)

1 March 2014 Final	Leinster	1-23 – 0-16	Connacht	Croke Park
	E Larkin 0-12 (5f, 4 '65), C Fennelly 0-3, L Ryan 0-3, R O'Dwyer 1-0, C Keaney 0-2, R Hogan 0-1, W Walsh 0-1, D Currams 0-1.	Report	C Cooney 0-8 (4f), J Flynn 0-2, R Commins 0-2, N Healy 0-2, P Brehony 0-1, P Landers 0-1.	Referee: Eamonn Hassan (Derry)
