= Keith Rossiter =

Irish hurling coach, manager and former player

Personal information
- Native name: Ceiteach Ó Roiseteir (Irish)
- Born: 16 January 1984 (age 42) Oulart, County Wexford, Ireland
- Occupation: Sales rep

Sport
- Sport: Hurling
- Position: Full-back
Club
- Years: Club
- 2002–: Oulart–The Ballagh
Club titles
- Wexford titles: 10
- Leinster titles: 1
- All-Ireland Titles: 0
College
- Years: College
- 2002–2006: Waterford Institute of Technology
College titles
- Fitzgibbon titles: 2
Inter-county*
Years	County	Apps (scores)
2004–2015	Wexford	33 (0–0)
Inter-county titles
- Leinster titles: 1
- All-Irelands: 0
- NHL: 0
- All Stars: 0
- *Inter County team apps and scores correct as of 17:39, 23 July 2019.

Keith Rossiter (born 16 January 1984) is an Irish hurling coach, manager and former player. He was the manager of the Wexford senior team from 2023 until 2026. He played for Wexford Senior Championship club Oulart–The Ballagh and was a member of the Wexford senior team for 12 seasons, during which time he usually lined out as a full-back.

== Playing career ==
=== Waterford Institute of Technology ===
As a student at the Waterford Institute of Technology, Rossiter immediately became involved in hurling as a member of the Waterford IT freshers' team. He joined the senior hurling team during his second year.

On 6 March 2004, Rossiter lined out at centre-back when the Waterford Institute of Technology faced University College Cork in the Fitzgibbon Cup final. He ended the game with his first winners' medal as Waterford IT retained the title following an 0–11 to 0–9 victory.

On 4 March 2006, Rossiter played in a second Fitzgibbon Cup final in three years. Lining out at right corner-back he claimed a second winners' medal after a 4–13 to 0–8 defeat of University College Dublin.

=== Oulart–The Ballagh ===
Rossiter joined the Oulart–The Ballagh club at a young age and played in every grade at juvenile and underage levels. He experienced championship success in the under-21 grade before becoming a member of the club's senior team.

On 17 October 2004, Rossiter lined out at full-back when Oulart–The Ballagh faced reigning-champions Rathnure in the Wexford Senior Championship final. He ended the game with a winners' medal following the 1–17 to 1–10 victory.

Oulart–The Ballagh qualified for a second successive final on 23 October 2005 with Rossiter once again lining out at full-back. He claimed a second successive winners' medal after the 1–15 to 1–9 victory over St Martin's.

Rossiter lined out in a third successive final on 16 October 2006 with Rathnure providing the opposition. After starting the game at full-back he was switched to midfield to curb the influence of Paul Codd, however, the game ended in a draw. Rossiter was switched to right corner-back for the replay on 22 October 2006, however, he ended the game on the losing side after a 1–12 to 0–6 defeat.

On 21 October 2007, Rossiter lined out at centre-back in a fourth successive final when Oulart–The Ballagh faced Buffer's Alley. He claimed a third winners' medal following the 4–14 to 2–6 victory.

Oulart-the Ballagh qualified for a fifth successive final on 3 November 2008 with St. Martin's providing the opposition. Rossiter was switched from being a defender to centre-forward; however, he was held scoreless in the 1–13 to 1–8 defeat.

Rossiter was moved back to his more regular position of centre-back when Oulart–The Ballagh faced Buffer's Alley in a second final in three years on 11 October 2009. He ended the game with a fourth winners' medal following the 3–12 to 1–13 victory.

On 10 October 2010, Rossiter captained the team when Oulart–The Ballagh faced St Martin's in the final once again. He ended the game with a fifth winners' medal following the 1–14 to 0–6 victory. Rossiter was again at full-back when Oulart–The Ballagh suffered a 0–14 to 1–8 defeat by O'Loughlin Gaels in the Leinster Club SHC final on 30 January 2011.

Rossiter was selected at full-back when Oulart–The Ballagh faced Rathnure in the final on 9 October 2011. He claimed a sixth winners' medal following the 1–10 to 0–11 victory. On 27 November 2011, Rossiter lined out in a second successive Leinster final but ended on the losing side once again following a 1–15 to 1–11 defeat by Coolderry.

On 14 October 2012, Rossiter captained Oulart–The Ballagh against Faythe Harriers in the Wexford Senior Championship final. He was described as having an "inspirational game" at full-back and collected a seventh winners' medal following the 2–12 to 0–13 victory. On 9 December 2012, Rossiter was again at full-back when Oulart-the Ballagh suffered a 1–12 to 0–11 defeat by Kilcormac–Killoughey in the Leinster Club SHC final.

On 20 October 2013, Rossiter lined out at full-back when Oulart–The Ballagh took on Ferns St Aidan's in the 2013 Wexford Senior Championship final. He collected an eighth winners' medal following the 3–12 to 1–16 victory. On 1 December 2013, Rossiter was again at full-back when Oulart-the Ballagh suffered an 0–11 to 0–8 defeat by Mount Leinster Rangers in a fourth successive Leinster Club SHC final.

Rossiter lined out in an 11th Wexford Senior Championship final on 25 October 2015. He "dominated" in front of goal as a full-back and collected a ninth winners' medal following the 2–15 to 0–13 defeat of St. Martin's. On 29 November 2015, Rossiter was again at full-back when Oulart–The Ballagh defeated Cuala by 2–13 to 0–13 to win the Leinster Championship.

On 16 October 2016, Rossiter played in his 12th Wexford Senior Championship final. Lining out at full-back, he ended the game with a remarkable 10th winners' medal following the 0–17 to 1–11 defeat of Cloughbawn.

Oulart–The Ballagh qualified for another Wexford Senior Championship final on 22 October 2017. Rossiter again lined out full-back, however, he ended the game on the losing side for the third time in his career following the 2–16 to 1–9 defeat by St Martin's.

=== Wexford ===
==== Minor and under-21 ====
Rossiter was just 16-years-old when he first lined out for Wexford as a member of the minor team during the 2000 Leinster MHC. He made his first appearance for the team on 24 June 2000 when he lined out at right corner-back in a 3–9 to 1–14 defeat by Dublin.

Eligible for the minor grade in 2001, Rossiter was unable to line out due to injury. After receiving a back injury in a club game, an MRI scan showed that he had cracked his spine after a vertebra broke off. Rossiter subsequently underwent an operation with a 25% chance of becoming unable to walk. The operation and year-long rehabilitation were a complete success.

Rossiter was drafted onto the Wexford under-21 team in advance of the 2003 Leinster U21HC. He made his first appearance for the team on 24 June 2003 when he lined out at centre-back in Wexford's 2–16 to 0–9 defeat by Dublin.

On 14 July 2004, Rossiter was again at centre-back when Wexford qualified to play Kilkenny in the Leinster U21HC final at Wexford Park. He ended the game on the losing side following a 1–16 to 2–3 defeat.

Rossiter was eligible for the under-21 grade for a third and final season in 2005. He played his last game in the grade on 22 June 2005 when Wexford suffered a 2–13 to 0–15 defeat by Kilkenny.

==== Senior ====
Rossiter was added to the Wexford senior panel in advance of the 2003 National League. He made his first appearance for the team on 22 February 2003 when he lined out at left wing-back in Wexford's 2–16 to 1–14 defeat of Derry in their opening league game. Rossiter made his Leinster SHC debut on 8 June 2003 when he lined out at left corner-back in a 0–16 to 1–12 defeat of Offaly. He was switched to right wing-back for the Leinster SHC final on 6 July 2003, but ended on the losing side after a 2–23 to 2–12 defeat by Kilkenny.

On 4 July 2004, Rossiter was selected on the bench when Wexford lined out against Offaly in the Leinster SHC final. He remained on the bench for the entire game, but ended it with a winners' medal following the 2–12 to 1–11 defeat of Offaly.

Rossiter was back on the starting fifteen at left corner-back when Wexford faced Kilkenny in the Leinster SHC final on 7 July 2005. He ended the game on the losing side after a 0–22 to 1–16 victory for Kilkenny.

Rossiter was appointed captain of the Wexford senior team for the 2006 season. He lined out in a fourth successive Leinster SHC final on 2 July 2006, with Kilkenny providing the opposition for the third time. Rossiter ended the game as a runner-up following the 1–23 to 2–12 defeat.

On 1 July 2007, Rossiter lined out in a fifth successive Leinster SHC final. Playing at centre-back, he ended the game on the losing side for the fourth time in his career after a 2–24 to 1–12 defeat by Kilkenny.

Rossiter lined out in a sixth successive Leinster SHC final on 6 July 2008; however, for the fifth time in his career, Rossiter ended up on the losing side after a 5–21 to 0–17 defeat by Kilkenny.

On 2 May 2010, Rossiter lined out at full-back when Wexford faced Clare in the National League Division 2 final. He ended the game with a winners' medal following the 1–16 to 2–9 victory.

Rossiter announced his retirement from inter-county hurling on 28 January 2015. He said: "It's something I've been thinking about probably since last year...In my own eyes I'd have looked at 2014, coming into that season, as being my last one. No one knew that, but it was always at the back of my mind."

=== Leinster ===
Rossiter was first selected for the Leinster inter-provincial team during the 2012 Inter-provincial Championship. On 4 March 2012, he lined out at full-back when Leinster defeated Connacht by 2–19 to 1–15 to win the Railway Cup.

On 1 March 2014, Rossiter was selected for the Leinster team for the Railway Cup final against Connacht. He was an unused substitute throughout the game but collected a second winners' medal following the 1–23 to 0–16 victory.

== Coaching career ==
=== Wexford coach ===
On 9 November 2016, it was revealed that Rossiter had joined Davy Fitzgerald's Wexford senior hurling management team as a coach. In his first season as a coach, he helped guide the team to promotion to Division 1A of the National Hurling League after remaining undefeated in the group stage. On 2 July 2017, Rossiter was part of the management team that saw Wexford reach a first Leinster SHC final in nine years, only to lose to Galway by 0–29 to 1–17.

On 20 January 2018, Rossiter was coach when Wexford drew 1–24 apiece with Kilkenny in the Walsh Cup final. Wexford won the subsequent free-taking shoot-out, with Rossiter securing his first silverware with Wexford.

Wexford reached a second Leinster SHC final in three years on 30 June 2019, with Rossiter on the sideline once again. A 1–23 to 0–23 defeat of Kilkenny secured a first Leinster SHC title since Rossiter's own playing career in 2004.

=== Wexford manager ===
In August 2023, Rossiter was appointed manager of the Wexford senior hurlers.

In June 2026, Rossiter stepped down as manager of Wexford after three years in charge.

== Career statistics ==
Team	Year	National League			Leinster		All-Ireland		Total	
Team	Year	Division	Apps	Score	Apps	Score	Apps	Score	Apps	Score
Wexford	2003	Division 1B	6	0–0	2	0–0	0	0–0	8	0–0
Wexford	2004	Division 1B	3	0–0	0	0–0	1	0–0	4	0–0
Wexford	2005	Division 1B	8	0–0	2	0–0	1	0–0	11	0–0
Wexford	2006	Division 1A	7	0–0	2	0–0	1	0–0	10	0–0
Wexford	2007	Division 1A	6	0–0	2	0–0	2	0–0	10	0–0
Wexford	2008	Division 1A	5	0–0	2	0–0	1	0–0	8	0–0
Wexford	2009	Division 2	1	0–0	0	0–0	1	0–0	2	0–0
Wexford	2010	Division 2	6	0–0	1	0–0	1	0–0	8	0–0
Wexford	2011	Division 2	5	0–0	2	0–0	1	0–0	8	0–0
Wexford	2012	Division 1B	5	0–0	1	0–0	2	0–0	8	0–0
Wexford	2013	Division 1B	0	0–0	1	0–0	1	0–0	2	0–0
Wexford	2014	Division 1B	5	0–0	2	0–0	4	0–0	11	0–0
Career total			57	0–0	17	0–0	16	0–0	90	0–0

== Honours ==
=== As a player ===
Waterford Institute of Technology

- Fitzgibbon Cup (2): 2004, 2006

Oulart–The Ballagh

- Leinster Senior Club Hurling Championship (1): 2015
- Wexford Senior Hurling Championship (10): 2004, 2005, 2007, 2009, 2010 (c), 2011, 2012 (c), 2013, 2015, 2016

Wexford

- Leinster Senior Hurling Championship (1): 2004
- National Hurling League Division 2 (1): 2010

Leinster

- Railway Cup (2): 2012, 2014

=== As a coach ===
Wexford

- Leinster Senior Hurling Championship (1): 2019
- Walsh Cup (1): 2018

Sporting positions
Preceded by Michael Jacob	Wexford Senior Hurling Captain; 2006	Succeeded by Nigel Higgins
Preceded by Darren Stamp	Wexford Senior Hurling Captain; 2012	Succeeded by Garrett Sinnott
