= Rathnure =

Rathnure Ráth an Iúir
- Village
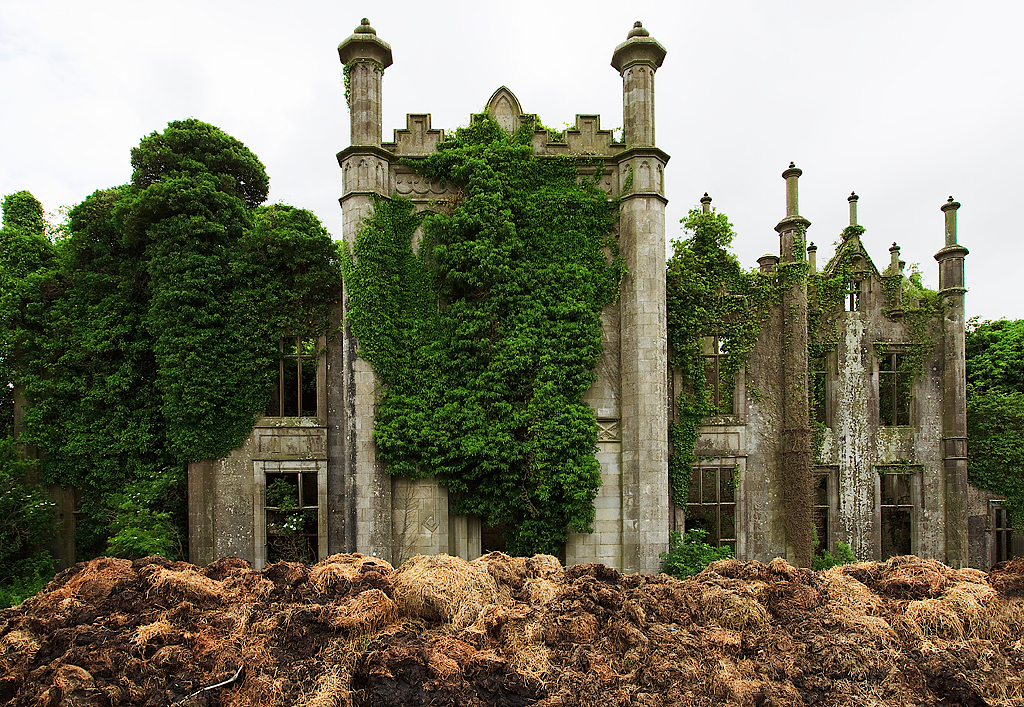
- Coolbawn House, burned in the 1920s, lies 1 km south of Rathnure

- Location in Ireland
- Coordinates: 52°30′00″N 6°46′00″W
- Country: Ireland
- Province: Leinster
- County: County Wexford
- Elevation: 60 m (200 ft)
- Time zone: UTC+0 (WET)
  - Summer (DST): UTC-1 (IST (WEST))
- Irish Grid Reference: S834393

Rathnure (Irish: Ráth an Iúir, meaning 'ringfort of the yew trees') is a small village on the R731 regional road about 12 km (7.5 mi) from the town of Enniscorthy, County Wexford, Ireland. The village is located at the foot of the Blackstairs Mountain, which borders County Carlow on the opposite side.

== Places of interest ==
Local points of interest include the John Kelly Memorial and grave in Kilanne, and Monksgrange House. Monksgrange House, which is owned by the Hill family and was built in 1769, contains an art gallery, which exhibits works by contemporary Irish artists such as William Scott, Harry Kernoff and Hilda Roberts. Monksgrange has also played host to the performances of the Blackstairs Opera.

== Sport ==
Rathnure St. Annes GAA Club is the local Gaelic Athletic Association team. Principally involved in hurling, club members have included Nicky Rackard (who represented Wexford in both hurling and Gaelic football). Rathnure holds 20 county senior hurling titles and 6 Leinster titles - a record in the county.

Among others, Rathnure was or is home to a number of renowned Irish randonneurs.

== See also ==
- List of towns and villages in Ireland
